= Canopy walkway =

Elevated walkway

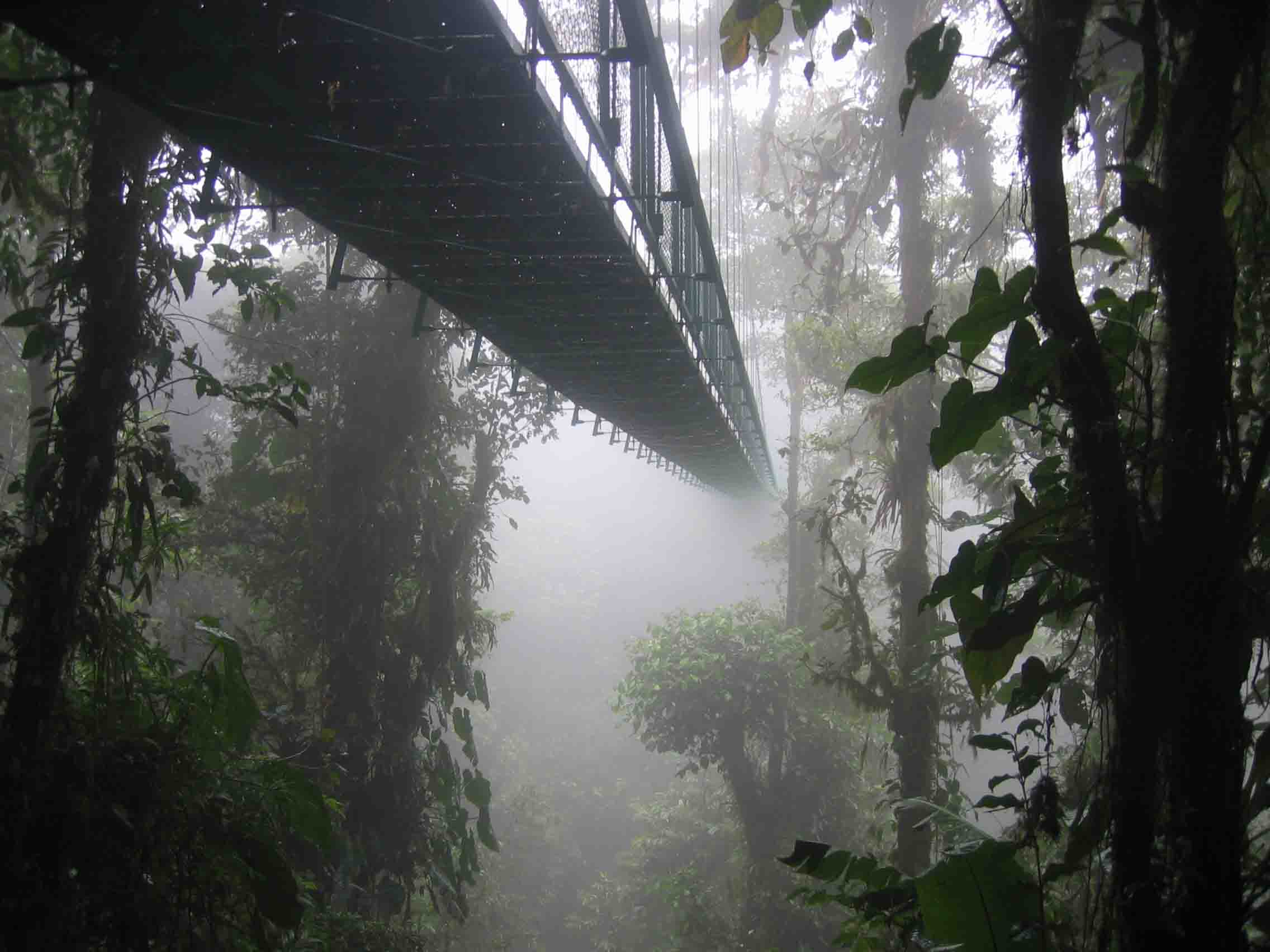
One of the hanging bridges of the 'Sky walk' in Santa Elena, Costa Rica

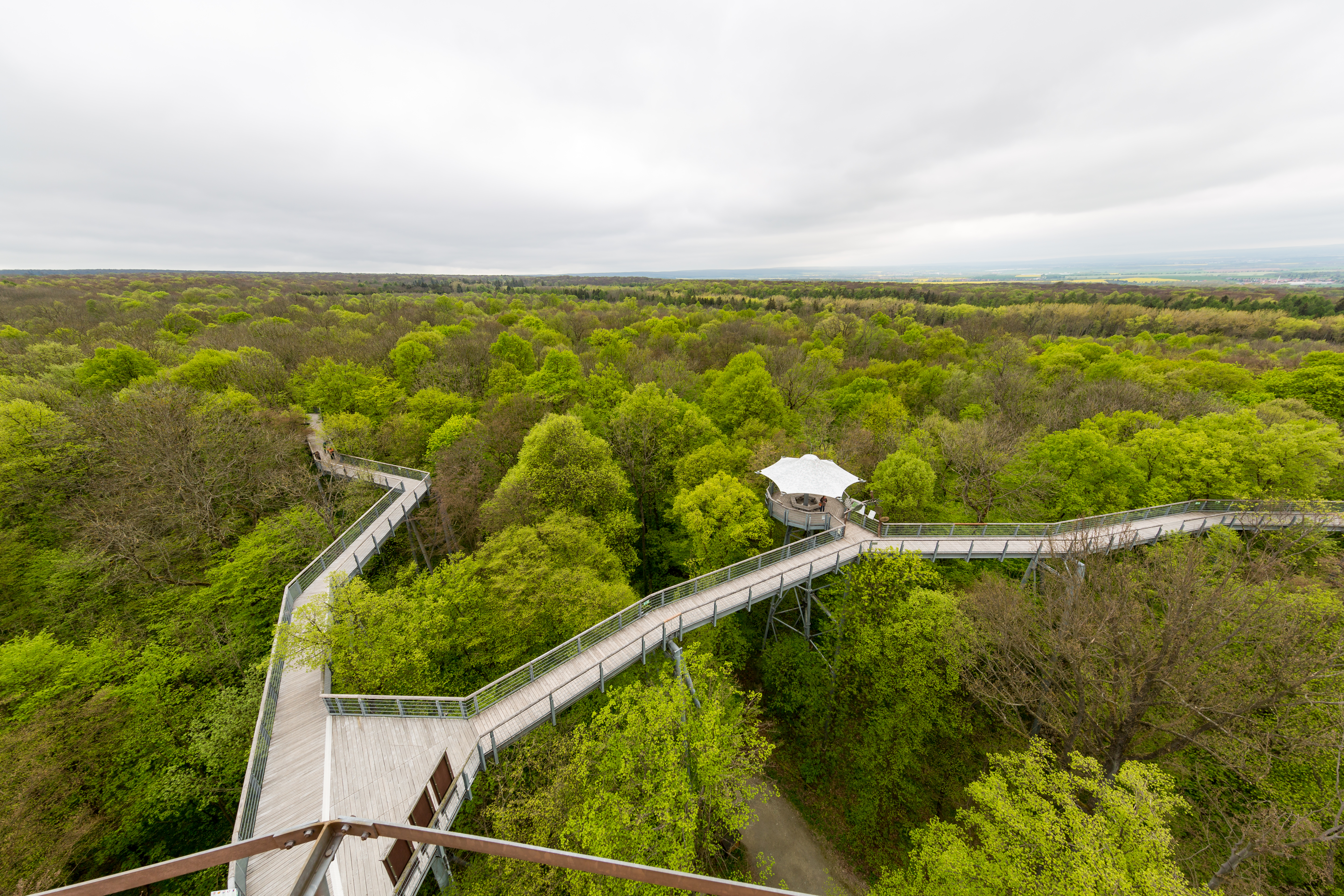
Canopy walkways ("Baumkronenpfad") at Hainich National Park, Germany

Canopy walkways – also called canopy walks, treetop walks or treetop walkways – provide pedestrian access to a forest canopy. Early walkways consisted of bridges between trees in the canopy of a forest; mostly linked up with platforms inside or around the trees. They were originally intended as access to the upper regions of ancient forests for scientists conducting canopy research. Eventually, because they provided only limited, one-dimensional access to the trees, they were abandoned for canopy cranes. Today they serve as ecotourism attractions in places such as Dhlinza Forest, KwaZulu-Natal, South Africa, Taman Negara National Park, Malaysia, Sedim River, Kulim, Nyungwe National Park, Rwanda and Kakum National Park, Ghana.

== Australia ==
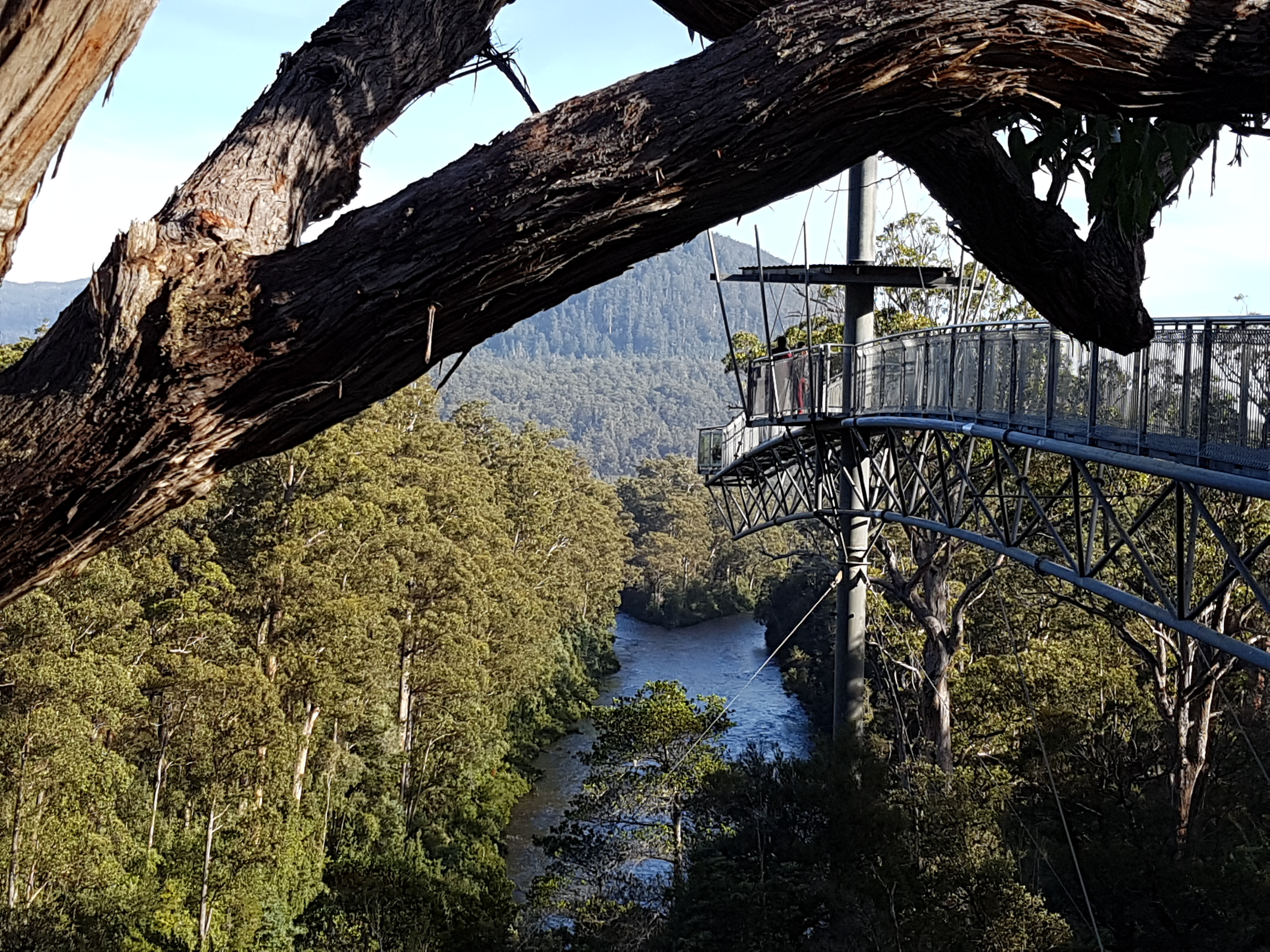
Tahune Airwalk, Tasmania

Canopy or treetop walkways are especially popular attractions in Australia. They can be found in most states and a variety of environments.

=== Tasmania ===
The Tahune AirWalk is located in state forest near Geeveston in southern Tasmania. Opened in 2001 it consists of a 619-metre-long elevated walkway incorporating a 37-metre-high observation tower and a cantilever 50 metres above the Huon River. Other activities at the complex include zip-line hang gliding.

=== Victoria ===
The Otway Fly claims to be the longest and highest 'steel canopy walk' in the world, It is 600 metres (2,000 ft) long with a maximum height of 47 metres (154 ft). Located on freehold land in the Otway Range in western Victoria, the walk traverses mixed-species forest with trees such as myrtle beech and mountain ash, the tallest hardwood species in the world. The mid-story environment includes an abundance of soft tree ferns and other smaller trees. The Otway Fly also offers zip-line tours where customers can glide 30 metres (98 ft) above the floor of the rainforest. The walkway was built in 2003 for $6.5 million and features a raised walking platform as well as a cantilever over Young's Creek and a 47-metre-tall (154 ft) 'spiral tower' viewing platform that takes the person into the upper canopy. It was originally operated by MFS Living and Leisure before being sold in 2011 to Merlin Entertainments, one of the world's largest operators of tourist attractions.

Victoria also boasts the Donna Buang Rainforest Gallery. Located east of Melbourne at Cement Creek on the slopes of Mount Donna Buang, it consists of a 350-metre-long metal walkway elevated one metre above ground level plus a cantilever platform 15 metres (49 ft) above the ground which allows canopy level views of the cool temperate rainforest. While there is interpretive signage, the Rainforest Gallery is unstaffed and entry is free.

In 2018 a small, 120-metre-long, 10-metre-high, canopy walkway opened at the seaside resort town of Lorne as part of Live Wire Park, a mainly zip line-oriented business. Unlike other canopy walkways in the state which are in rainforest, this one traverses scenic, open coastal woodland.

=== New South Wales ===
The Illawarra Fly Treetop Adventure includes a 500-metre-long steel walkway up to 30 metres above the ground and a 45-metre-high tower with views over the nearby Tasman Sea. The facility also includes zip-line tours. Built in 2008 for a cost of $6.5 million, like the Ottway Fly it was initially operated by MFS Living and Leisure until 2011 when it was sold to Merlin Entertainments.

The Skywalk at Dorrigo National Park is a short, 70-metre-long canopy walk that leads over the edge of an escarpment to a point 21 metres above the forest.

=== Queensland ===
The Mamu Tropical Skywalk is located near Innisfail in the north of the state. Owned by the Queensland Parks and Wildlife Service, it was opened in 2008. It features a 350-metre-long elevated walkway that makes its way through tropical rainforest 15 metres above the ground and includes a 37-metre-high observation tower.

The Tree Top Walk, was the first canopy walkway constructed in Australia. It can be found in Lamington National Park at O'Reilly's Rainforest Retreat, in southern Queensland. Built in 1988, it is 180 metres in length and constructed using 9 small suspension bridges. At its highest point it reaches 34 metres above ground level.

Tamborine Rainforest Skywalk is a 1.5 km walk with 300 metres on bridges and a cantilever extension over the forest. It opened in 2009.

The Daintree Discovery Centre Aerial Walkway in far north Queensland traverses tropical rainforest at 11 metres above the ground. It leads to a five-level, 23-metre-high observation tower.

=== Western Australia ===
Valley of the Giants Treetop Walk near Denmark in southern Western Australia is 620 metres long and includes sections up to 40 metres above the ground. It is owned by the state government's Department of Parks and Wildlife.

== Brunei ==
The Ulu Temburong National Park features an especially high (60 metres) forest canopy walkway that connects a series of treehouses. It is accessed by longboat.

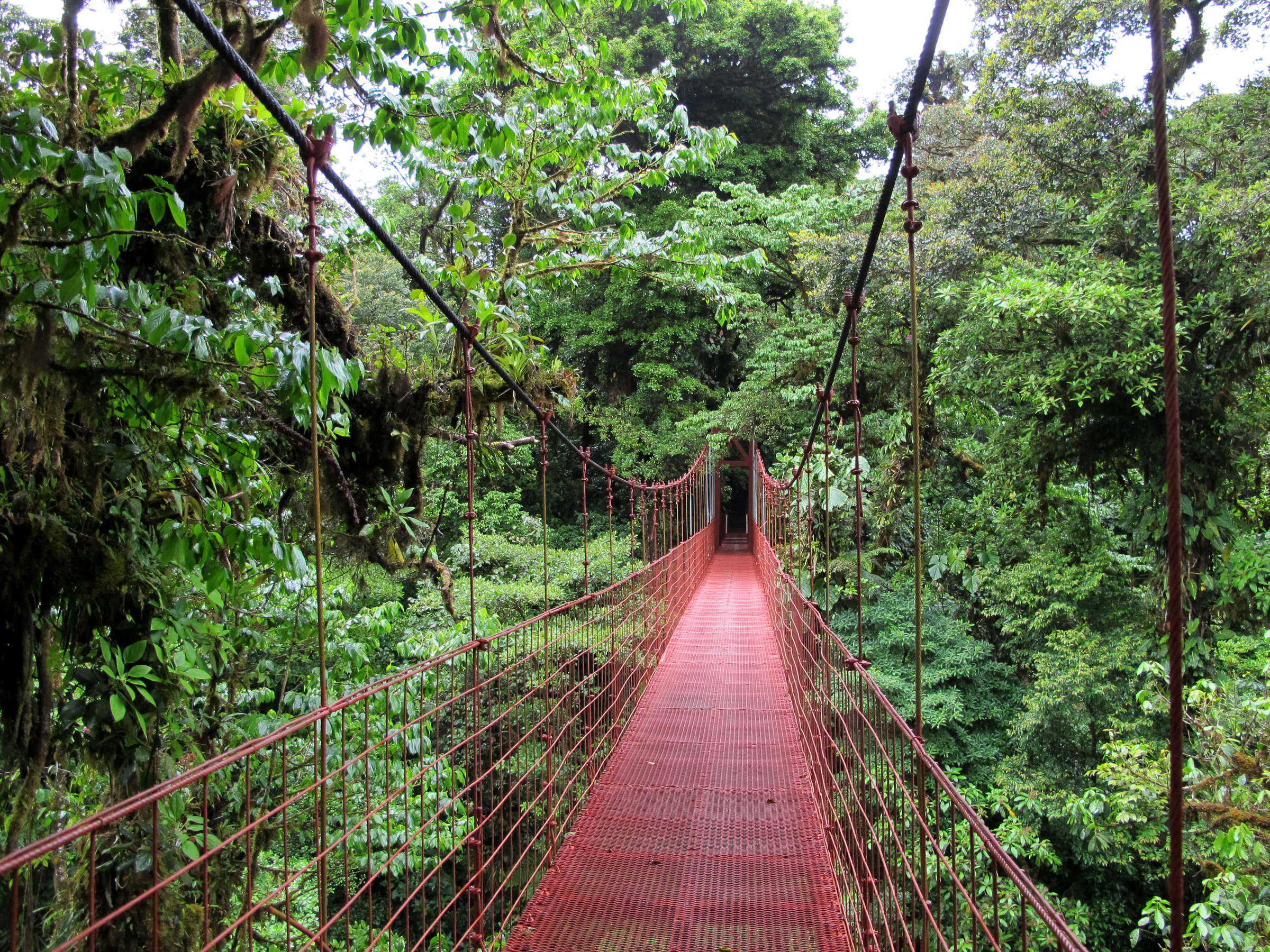
One of the bridges on the Sky Walk in Costa Rica

== Costa Rica ==
The Sky Walk is a walk above the canopy of the trees of the Monteverde Cloud Forest. Sky Walk features a combination of suspension bridges and trails with heights exceeding the treetops. Sky Walk is part of a larger forest tourism complex that includes walking tracks, a pulsed gondola and ziplines.

== Germany ==
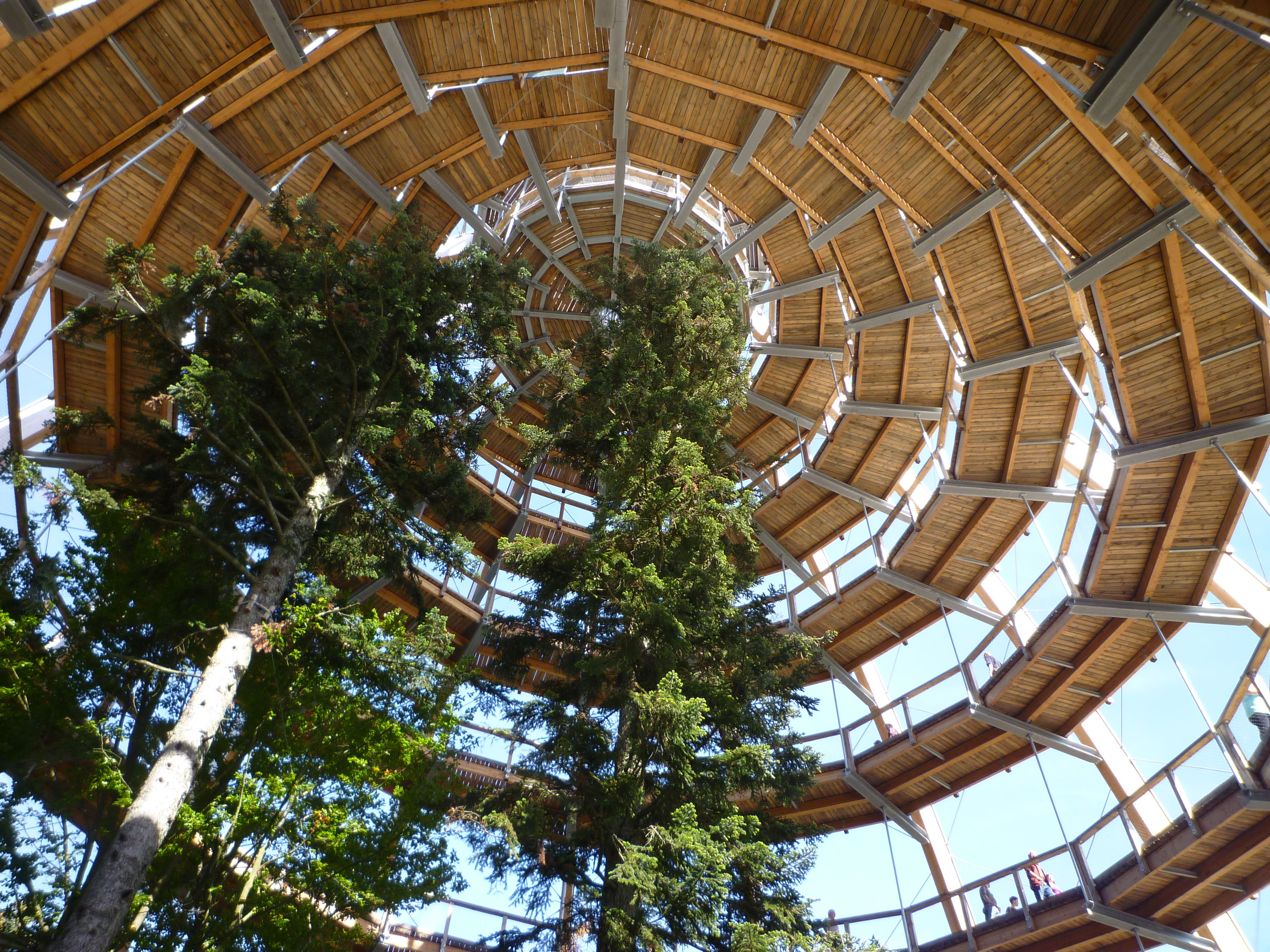
The spiral ramp in the dome at the end of the Baumwipfelpfad Neuschönau

The Baumwipfelpfad in Neuschonau, Bavaria, is a 1,300-metre-long walkway between 8 and 25 metres above the forest floor. It ends with a spiral climb up a 44-metre-high wooden dome.

The Baumwipfelpfad Harz (also Baumwipfelpfad Bad Harzburg) (de) is an educational and treetop path in the Harz Mountains in the area of the town of Bad Harzburg in the district of Goslar, Lower Saxony. The treetop path can be reached via an entry crown that spirals upwards over a length of around 300 meters (980 ft). The construction costs amounted to approx. 4.6 million euros and the construction project was carried out from November 2014 to March 2015. The treetop path was put into operation on 8 May 2015.

The Baumwipfelpfad – Saarschleife in Mettlach, Saarland is a 1,250-metre-long walkway reaching up to 23 meters (75 ft) above the ground. The observation tower at the end of the path reaches a height of 43 meters (141 ft).

The Baumkronenpfad at Hainich National Park. Only a 10 km drive away you can discover the canopy walkway at the UNESCO World Natural Heritage Hainich National Park. Walk in the tree tops up to 24 meters (79 ft) in height or climb the viewer tower with 44 meters (144 ft). Insights into the biospheres offer the National park exhibition and the latest attraction, the "Root cave". Nature lovers can hike and bike 18 trails and 3 cycle trails in untouched nature. www.baumkronen-pfad.de

== Ghana ==
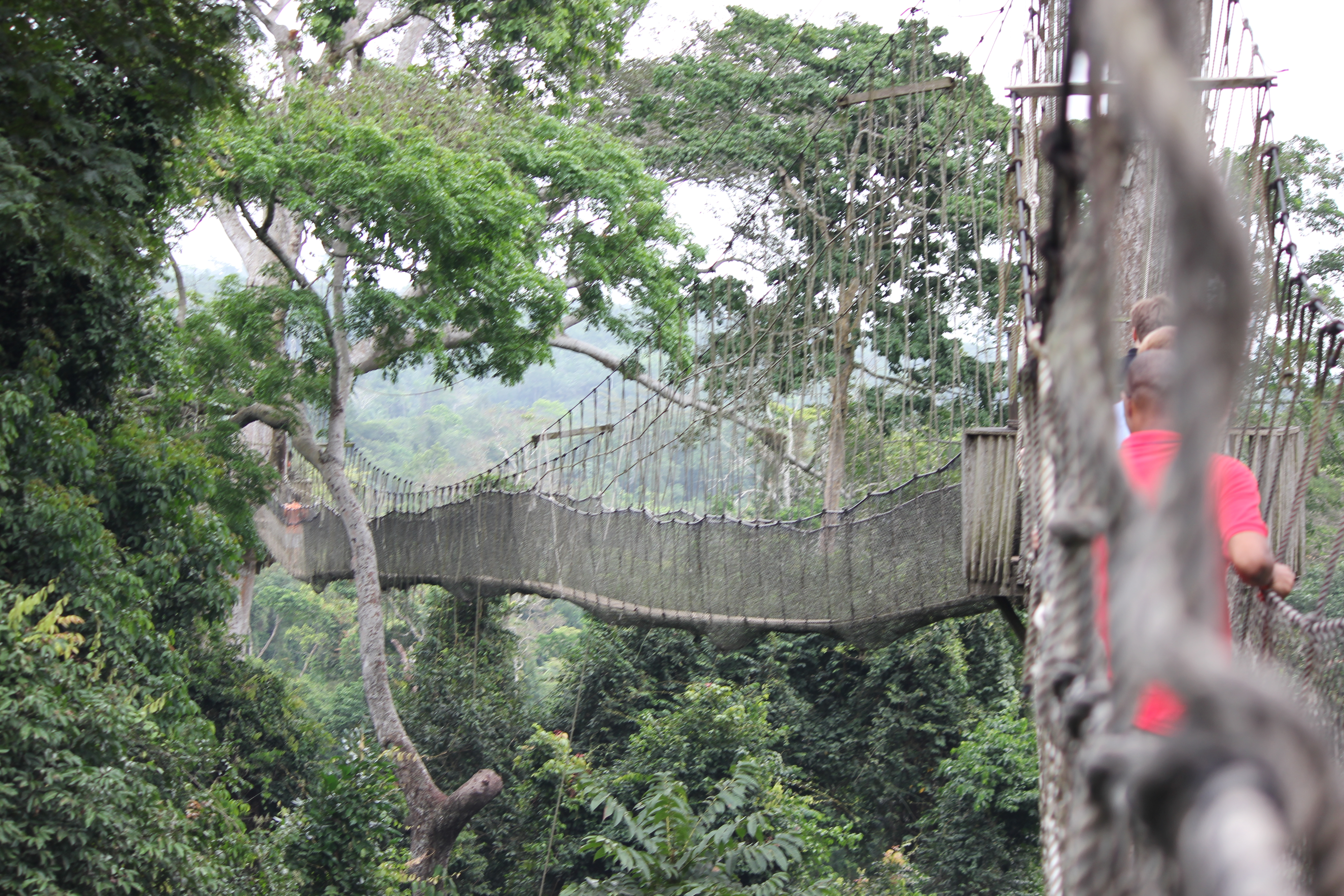
Canopy Walkway at the Kakum National Park

The Kakum Canopy Walkway extends for more than 300 metres and includes a viewing platform and seven bridges up to 35 metres above the forest floor.

== Malaysia ==
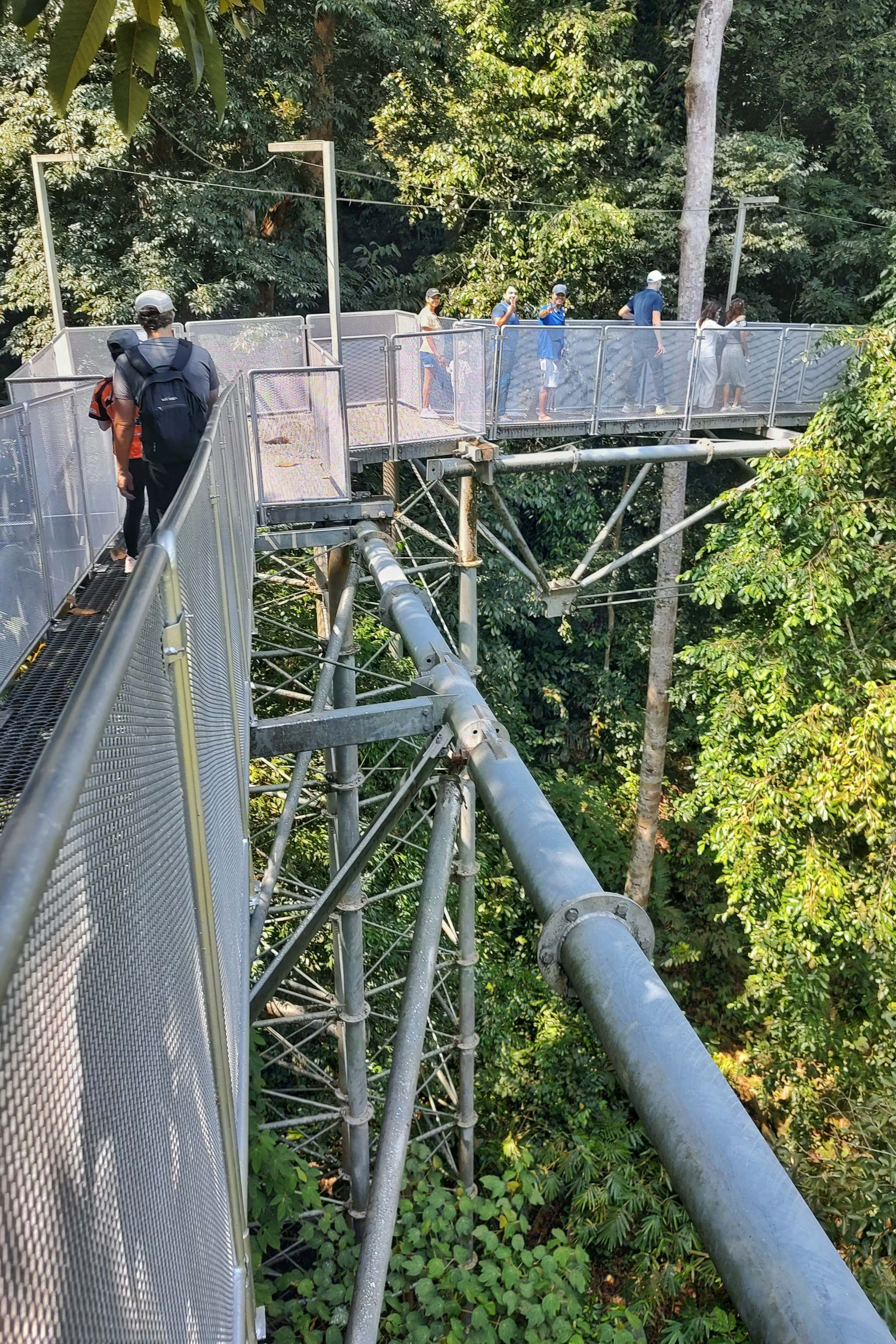
Sungai Sedim Treetop Walkway

The Danum Valley Canopy Walkway, located in Sabah, Malaysian Borneo gives visitors views of spectacular tropical rainforest from a 300-metre-long, 27-metre-high canopy walkway.

The Sungai Sedim Treetop Walkway located in Kedah, is 925 meters long.

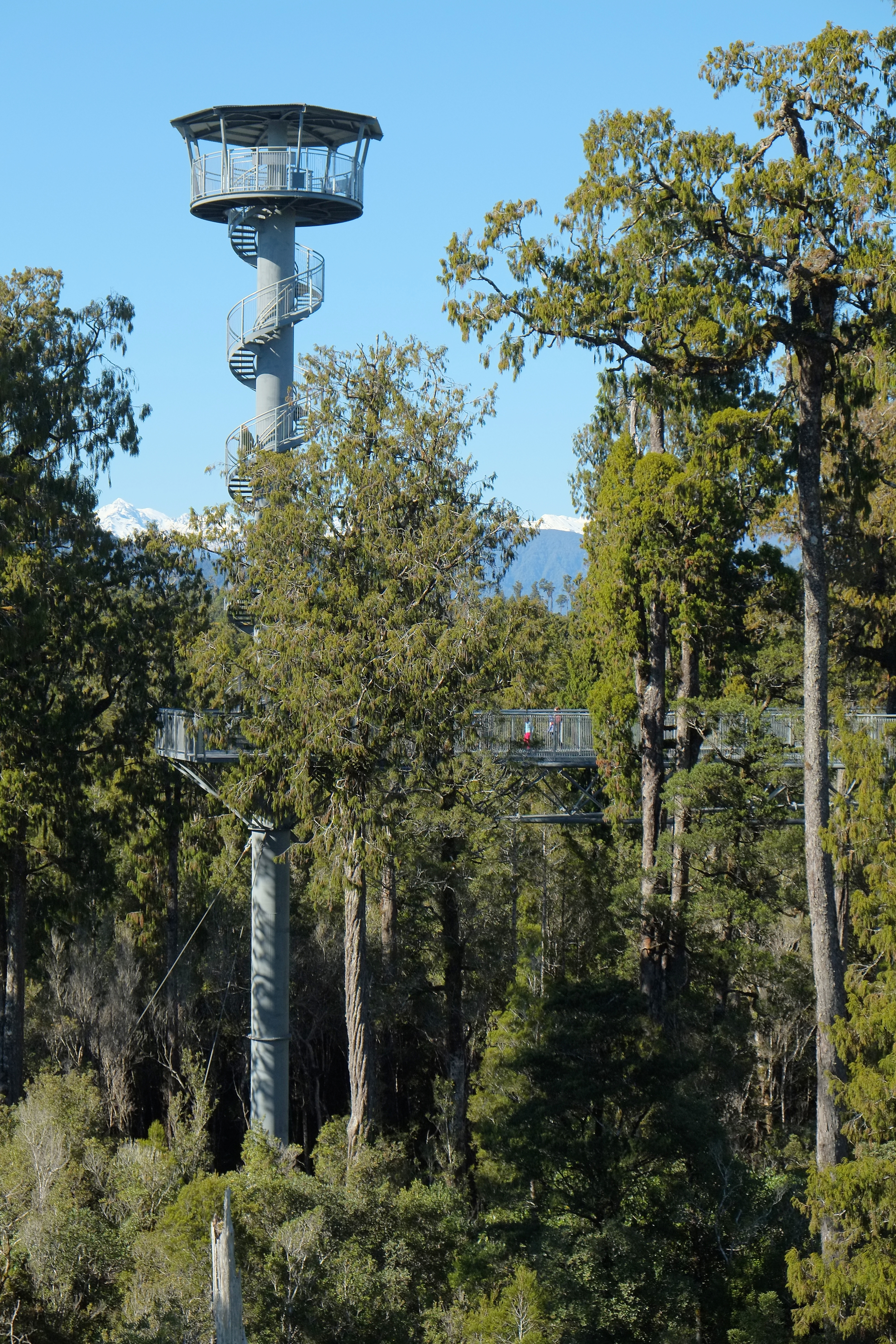
West Coast Treetop Walk, Hokitika

== New Zealand ==
Located on the rugged West Coast of the South Island of New Zealand, the West Coast Treetop Walk traverses rimu forest and was built by Australian eco-tourism company Canopy01 in 2012. It comprises a 450-metre-long elevated steel walkway and cantilever at heights up to 25 metres above the forest floor with a 47-metre-high viewing tower.

At Rotorua on the North Island, Rotorua Canopy Tours operate zipline tours that incorporate sections of canopy walkway.

== Nigeria ==
The country has the largest land mass in west Africa. It has 3 canopy walkways sited in Lagos and Cross river states. The longest Canopy walkway in Africa is at Lekki Conservation Centre which is a project sponsored by Chevron but managed and supervised by The Nigerian Conservation Foundation. The walkway is 401 metres long transversing the unique nature reserve, 22.5 metres high, the canopy walkway was handed over to the Nigerian Conservation Foundation by the Lagos state government 23–12–2015.

== Peru ==
The Inkaterra Canopy Walkway in the Peruvian Amazon is a 344-metre-long system of seven hanging bridges, six treetop observation platforms and two 29-metre-tall towers.

== Russia ==
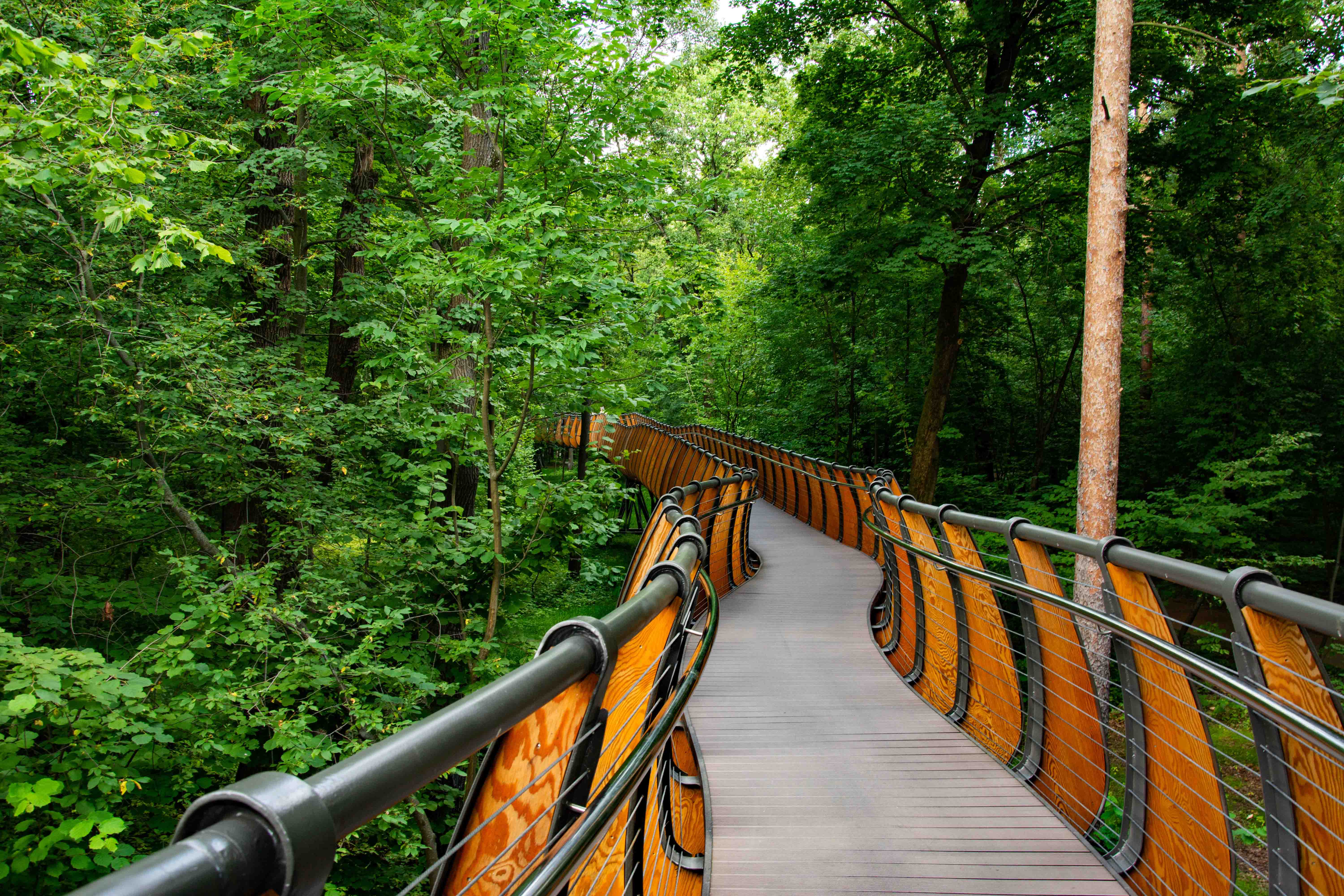
Landscape Park at VDNKh, Moscow, Russia

An ecological trail above the VDNKh Landscape Park in Moscow. The trail is up to 6.5 m (21 ft) high and approximately 500 m (1,600 ft) long.

The elevated ecological trail Through the Foliage (Russian: «Сквозь листву») in the Prioksko-Terrasny Nature Reserve. It operates from May to October.

== Samoa ==
At Falealupo, a village in Samoa situated at the west end of Savai'i island is the short Falealupo Rainforest Canopy Aerial Walkway which is up to 40 metres above the ground and passes through Banyan trees. It was built in 1997 and is part of a project to protect the rainforest and generate income for the local community through tourism.

== Singapore ==
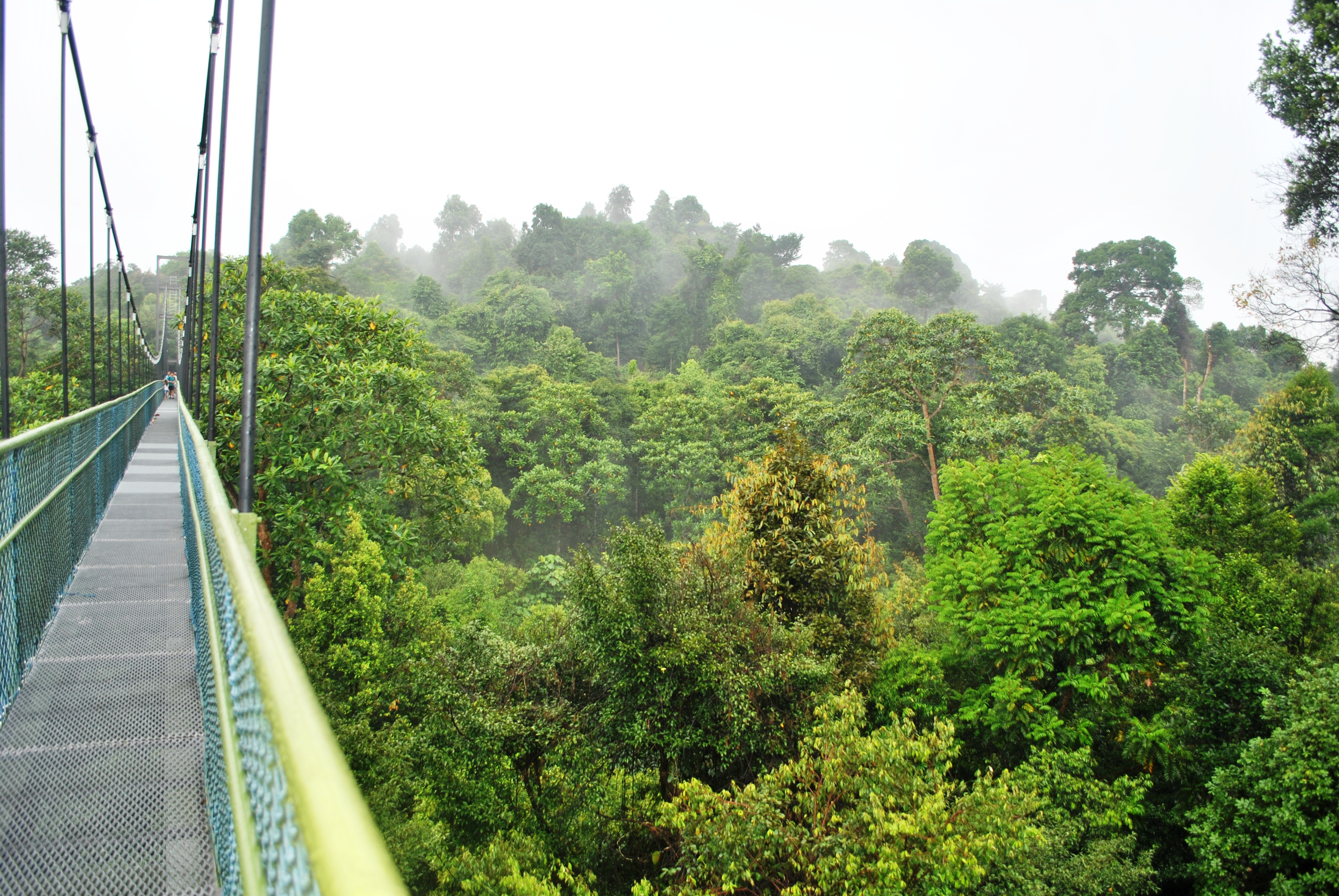
HSBC TreeTop Walk

The Southern Ridges Forest Walk is a 1.3 km elevated metal walkway soaring as high as 18 meters above the ground, on level with the treetops. One of the most impressive sections of the Southern Ridges Walk. About halfway through, the walk returns to earth for a moment, paralleling Preston Road and its "black and white" bungalows originally built for the officers of the British army and now much favored by wealthy expats in Singapore. The Southern Ridges Canopy Walk is a 280 m (920 ft) elevated metal walkway similar to the forest walk, somewhat shorter but among higher trees and closer to the trees as well.

The HSBC Treetop Walk is a 250-metre suspension bridge connecting the two highest points in MacRitchie – Bukit Pierce and Bukit Kalang. At the highest point, the bridge hangs 25 metres from the forest floor.

The SPH Walk of Giants in the Singapore Botanic Gardens is a 260 m-long (850 ft) elevated boardwalk with a maximum height from the ground of 8 m. It leads the visitor through a collection of trees which, can grow up to at least 60 m in height, some up to 80 m.

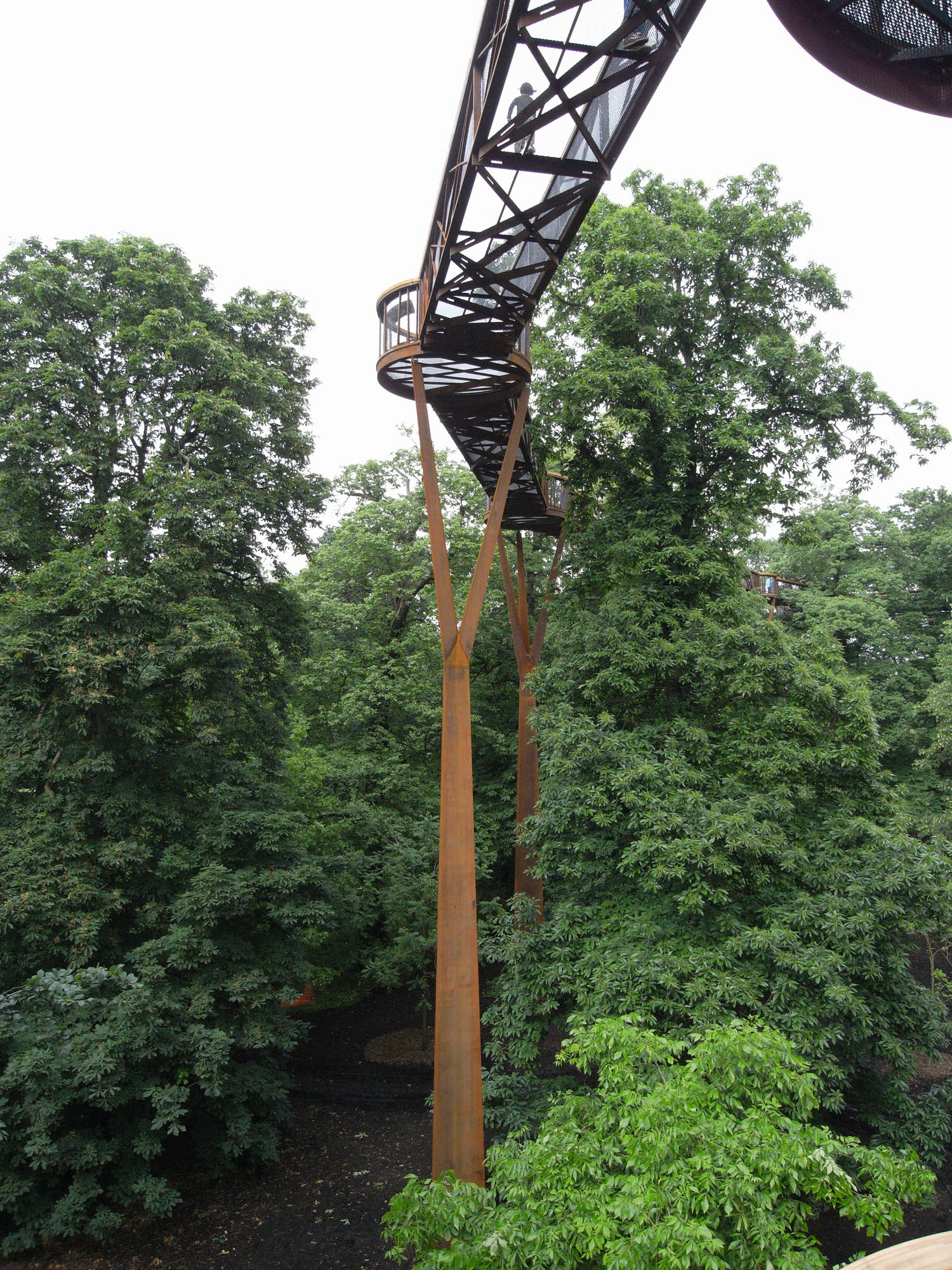
The Treetop Walkway at the Royal Botanic Gardens, Kew

== Switzerland ==
The Baumwipfelpfad Neckertal is a 500 metres (1,600 ft) long and up to 15 metres (49 ft) high canopy walkway in Mogelsberg, in the Toggenburg region of the canton of St. Gallen.

== Taiwan ==
The 800-metre-long Canopy Walkway at Guanyin Mountain Treetop Walkway, located in the Wugu District of New Taipei City, Taiwan, is a popular attraction in the Guanyinshan Scenic Area.

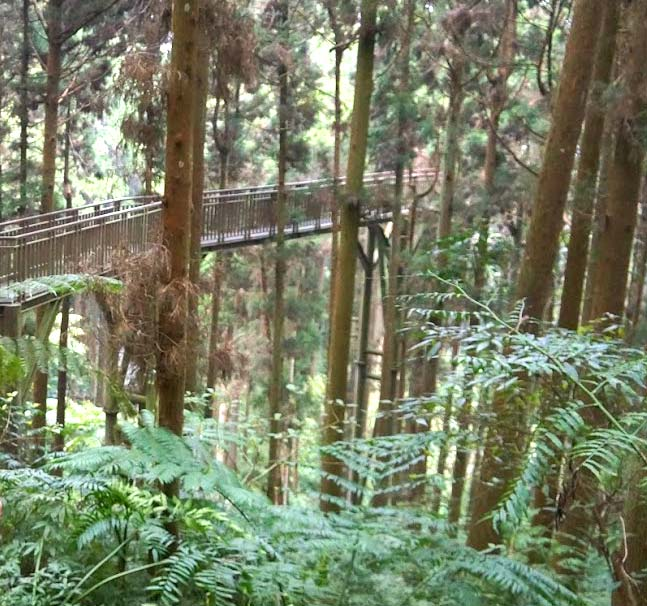
Guanyin Mountain Treetop Walkway, New Taipei City, Taiwan

It provides visitors with views of the surrounding landscapes, including the Tamsui River and Taipei city.

== Thailand ==
The 400-metre-long Canopy Walkway at Queen Sirikit Botanic Garden in Mae Rim District, Chiang Mai Province opened in 2015.

== United Kingdom ==
The 200-metre-long Treetop Walkway is at the Royal Botanic Gardens, Kew in London. It opened in 2008 and is not a forest walkway, but rather gives views over a mostly open park. It claims to give visitors an insight into forest canopies and the birds, insects and fungi that live there. Near the walkway is a unique tunnel allowing visitors to learn about tree roots before they climb to the walkway.

== United States ==
=== Florida ===
Myakka River State Park in Southwest Florida hosts North America's first canopy walkway, which runs 100 feet among oak and palm trees.

Discovery Island in Bay Lake at Walt Disney World operated from 1974 to 1999 and featured a canopy walkway in the Avian Way attraction. In 2017, it was dilapidated but still largely intact.

=== Georgia ===
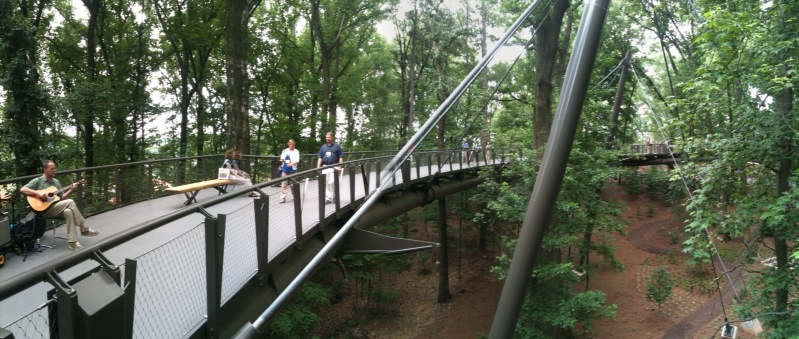
Atlanta Botanical Garden canopy walk

The Kendeda Canopy Walk in the Atlanta Botanical Garden is a more recent variation that provides visitors with the ability to move through a 180-metre-long (600 ft) the Storza Woods section of urban forest at an elevation of 12 metres (40 ft). The walkway construction is a somewhat unusual reverse suspension design. It opened in 2010 and cost $55 million to build.

=== Michigan ===
The 426-meter-long (1,398-foot) Whiting Forest of Dow Gardens canopy walk overlooks 54 acres of forest trails, ponds, meadows, and an apple orchard. Located in mid-Michigan, the canopy walk is currently the longest in the United States of America, with the highest point being 12 meters (39 feet) above the ground. It opened in the fall of 2018 with an investment of $20 million.
