= Treetop Walk Saarschleife =

Canopy walkway in Mettlach, Germany

Coordinates: 49°30′7.3″N 6°32′25.1″E

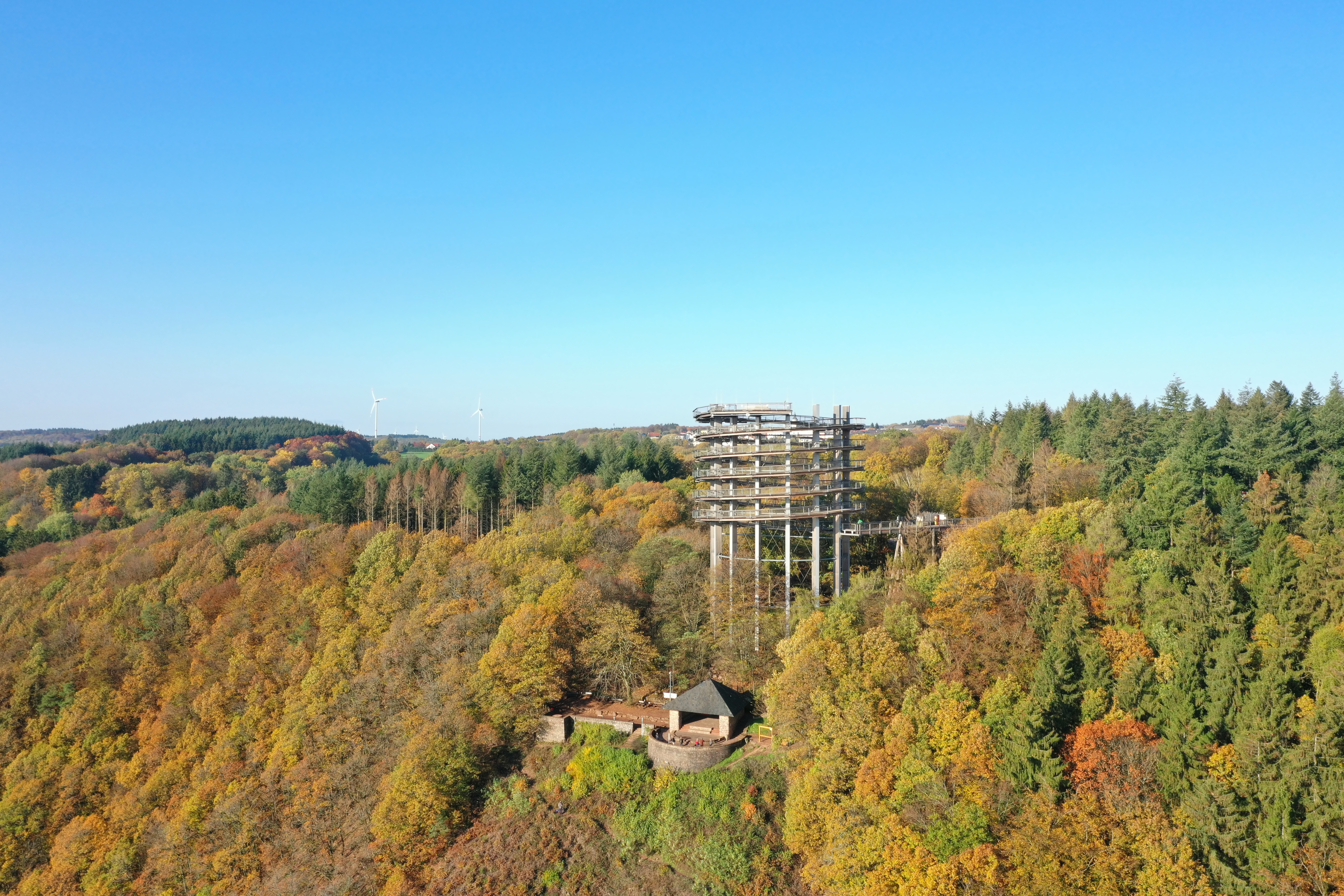
Shelter on the Cloef rock and Observation Deck

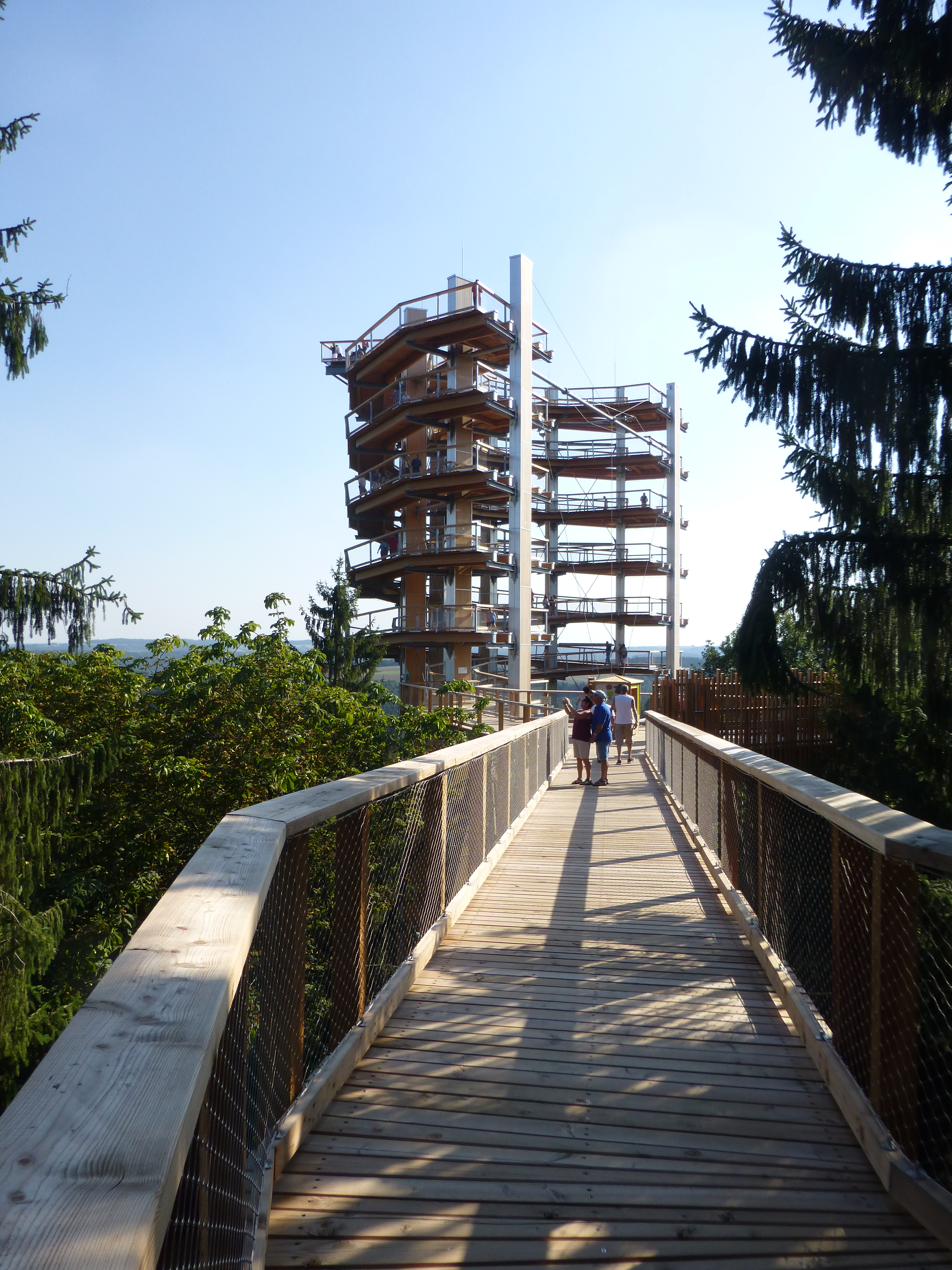
The Treeptop Walk Saarschleife with the Observation Deck

The Treetop Walk Saarschleife is a 1,250 meter long canopy walkway in the Orscholz area of Mettlach, Germany. Built atop a rocky vantage point known as the "Cloef", it offers visitors views of the Saarschleife. The major Saarland tourist attraction is operated by "Erlebnis Akademie AG."

== Structure ==
At 1,250 meters long, the treetop walkway winds its way to an observation tower that was constructed over the Cloef. The path is at a height of up to 23 m and has a minimum width of 2.5 meters. A series of four information stations along the path inform the visitor about quartzite, the beechwood forest, the Saarschleife, and wood debris, while children have access to a specially designed bridge and slide. The path winds its way to the top of the tower with rest areas along the way. By design, the path is completely handicap accessible with a maximum grade of a mere 6%.

The pathway is open all year, apart from 24 December, with only adjustments to its opening hours according to the time of year. The observation tower closes when wind speeds exceed 50 kmh.

== Construction and opening ==
The treetop walk was built by Erlebnis Akademie AG from Bad Kötzting thanks to a community initiative by Mettlach. The total cost for the project amounted to 4.7 million Euros including a contribution by Saarland of 275,000 Euros. The European Regional Development Funds also proved to be a key partner in the project. The treetop walk is a member of EUROPARC Deutschland and has been recognized as a distinguished national landscape. The treetop walk is made of 80% wood which required the use of 1,000 cubic meters of Douglas and larch wood as well as 100 tons of steel during construction.

The project's realization also came with criticism. Many critics believed that the observation tower would mar the surrounding landscape and nature - particularly on account of the area's special meaning for Saarland and its wide visibility. However, the Mettlach town council approved the project with a significant majority because of the tourism increase it promised to bring. The walkway was officially opened on 23 July 2016 and had attracted its 25,000th visitor within three weeks.
