= Great Canara Trail =

Hiking trail in India

Great Canara Trail is a hiking trail in India. It is the longest forest trekking and canopy walkway in India. The 270-km long trek take approximately 25 days to complete.
