= Saarschleife =

Water gap carved by the Saar River in Germany

Coordinates: 49°30′04″N 6°32′58″E

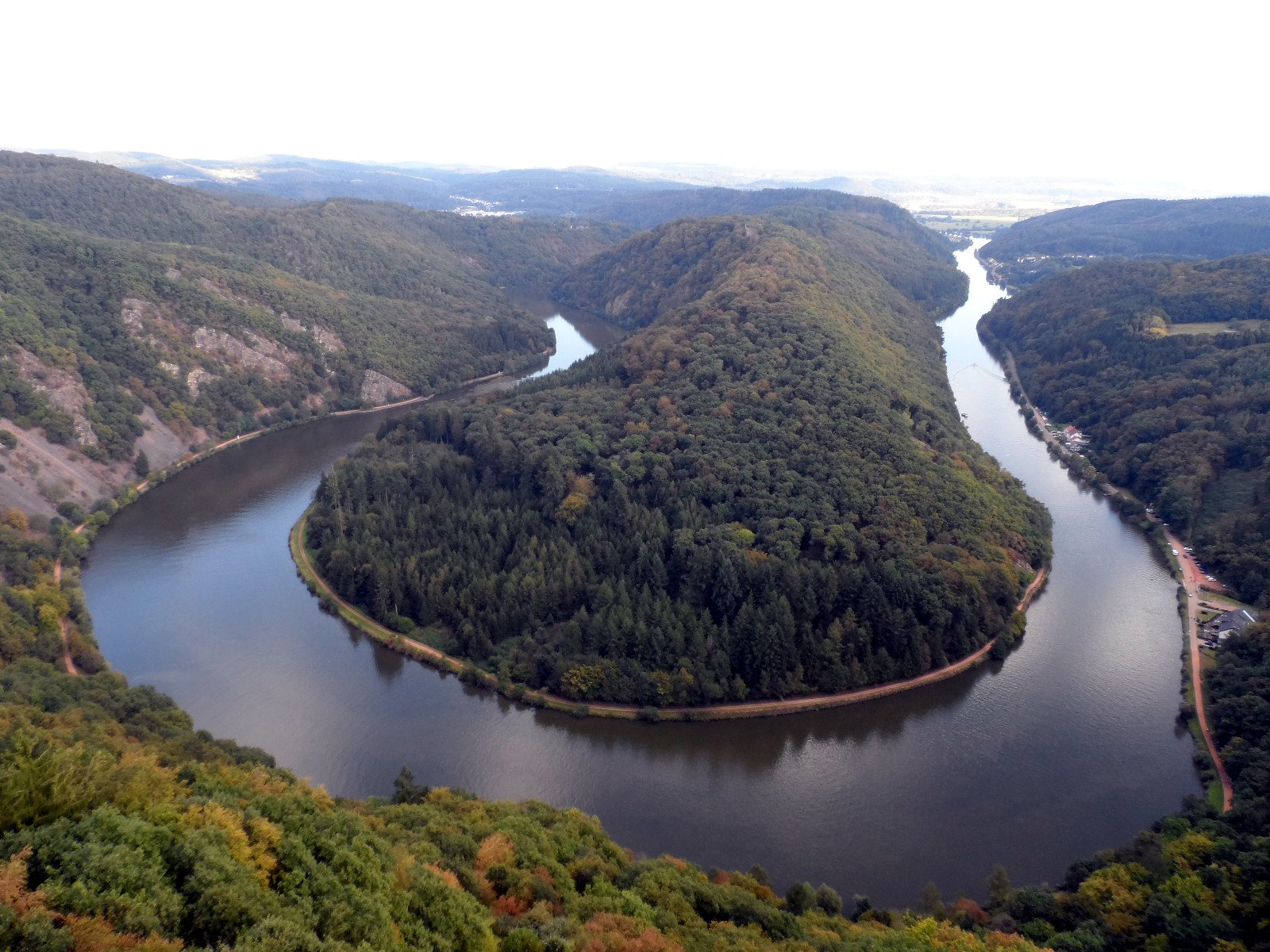
Saarschleife as viewed from the observation tower on the Treetop Walk Saarschleife

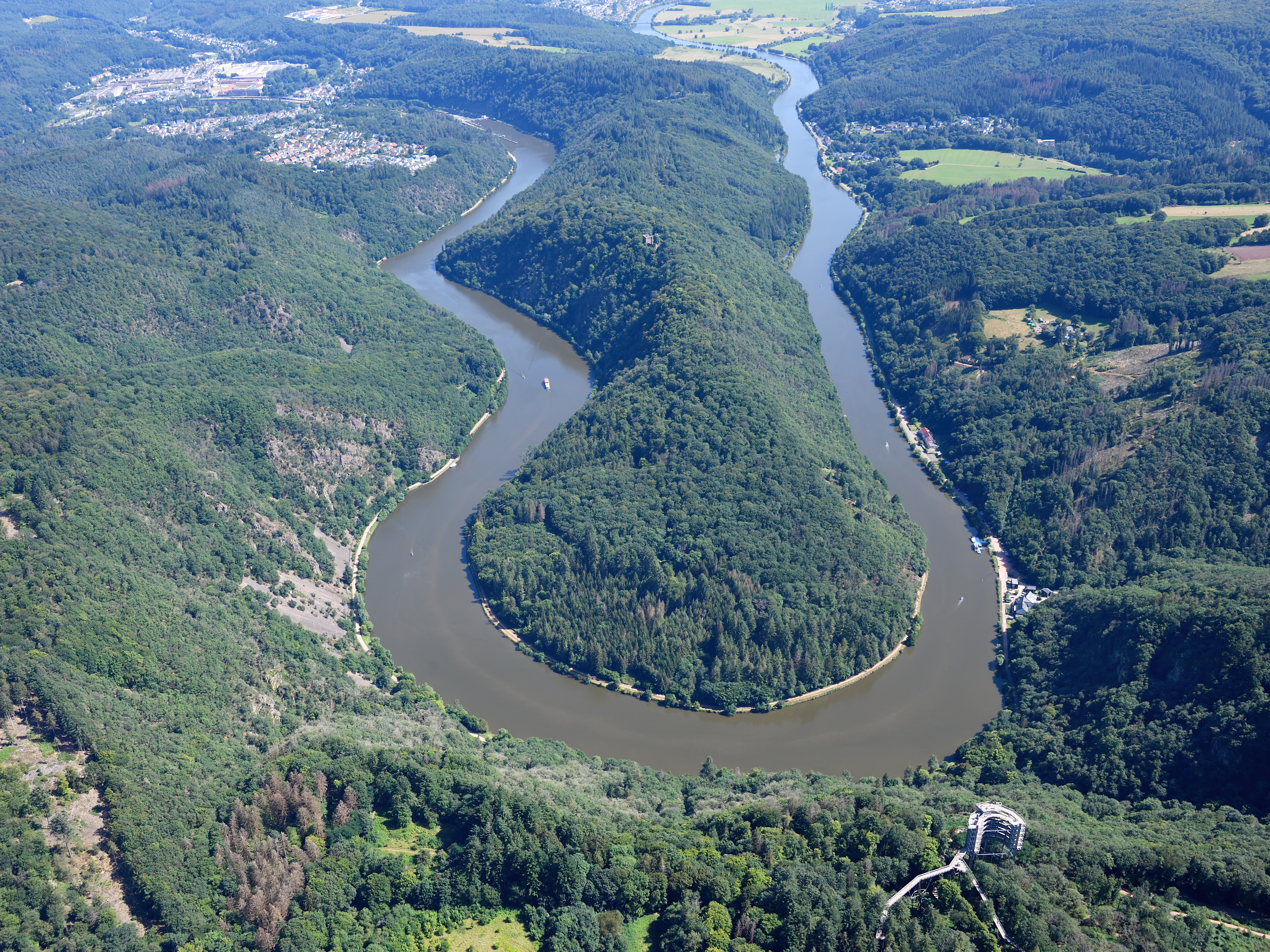
Aerial image of the Saarschleife. The castle Montclair is located on the mountain ridge. The Treetop Walk Saarschleife can be seen in the bottom right corner.

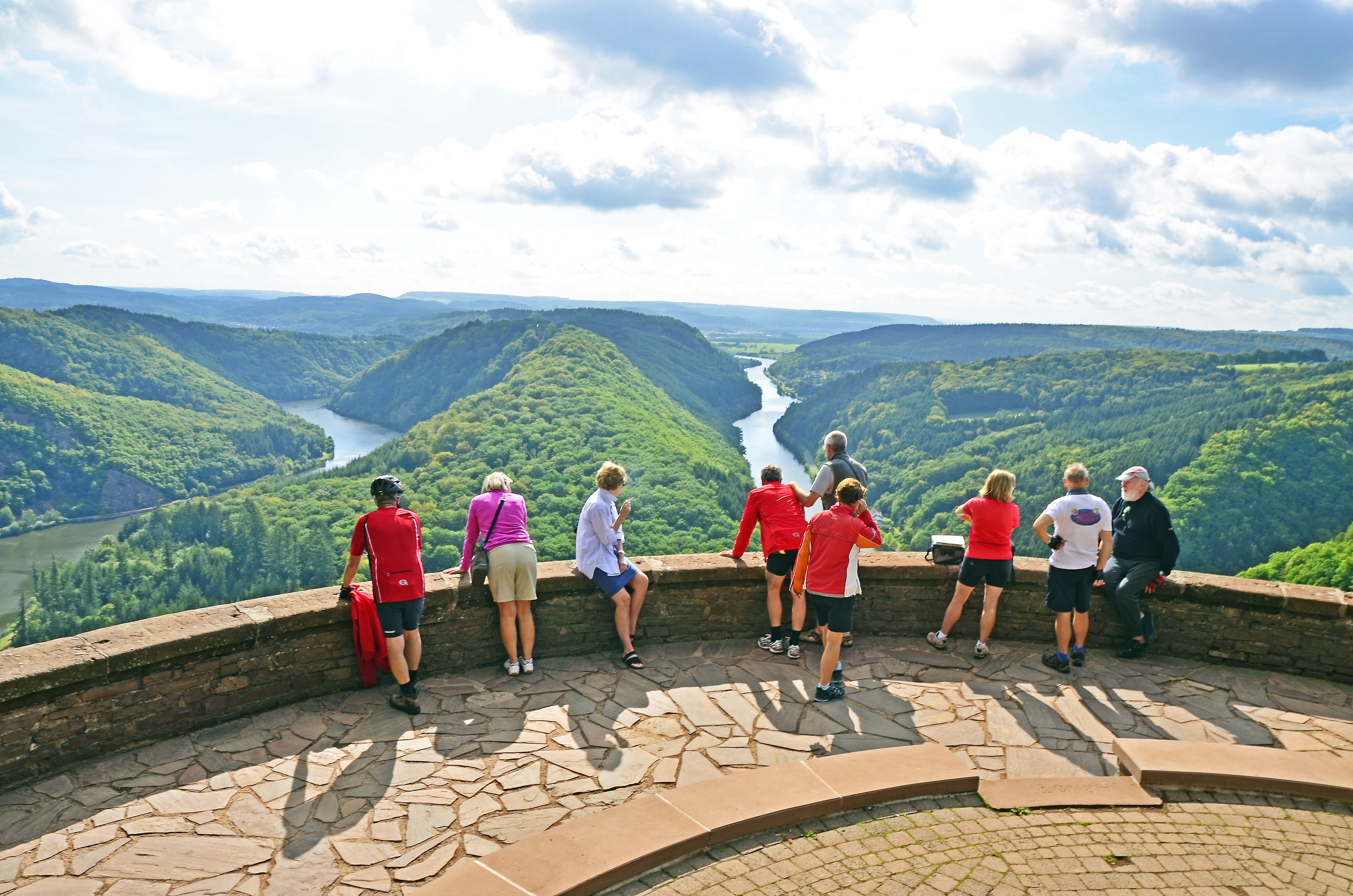
Visitor Terrace from the historic Cloef viewing area

The Saarschleife, also known as the Great Bend in the Saar at Mettlach, is a water gap carved by the Saar River through a quartzite layer and today one of the most well-known tourist attractions of the Saarland.

== Location ==
The Saarschleife begins near the Besseringen section of the town of Merzig and ends in Mettlach. Although Besseringen and Mettlach are only separated by approximately two kilometers, the Saar follows a winding course of nearly ten kilometers.

On the forested mountains within the Saarschleife, there are the historical sites of the former cloister church of St. Gangolf in addition to remnants of the former cloister complex as well as the ruins of Montclair fortress. The only locale located immediately on the Saarschleife is the village of Dreisbach, which can be reached by ferry.

On both the inner and outer riverbends run hiking and biking paths. An area west of the Saarschleife known as the "Steinbachtal" of approximately 100 hectares has been designated as a protected area.

== Geography ==
The narrowing of the Saarschleife between Besseringen and Dreisbach stems from the fact that the Saar, coming from the colored sandstone of the Merzig Basin, enters a section of hard quartzite rock. It is not exactly clear why the Saar failed to follow the more direct route between Besseringen and Mettlach. One possible explanation is that the Saar followed fractures of the Devonian quartzite, a weak zone, although a river tracking a rock weakness longer than two kilometers would be unusual. Investigations showed that the colored sandstone of the Saarschleife and its surroundings is only unevenly deposited on the underlying quartzite. When it was formed, the colored sandstone did not cover a previous layer level, but rather built upon an already existing relief. The quartzite divide most likely predated the colored sandstone layer that had gathered atop it, which was then later cleared away by the waters of the Saar. Together with the river's large meandering, the Saarschleife gradually deepened at a later mountain uplift. This step-by-step incision of the Saar is clearly visible to observers at the Cloef observation point when viewing the terraced sliding slope across the river.

This mountain spur around which the Saar flows has a length of 4 km and reaches its highest point at 318 m above sea level, while the surface of the Saar is around 166 m above sea level. The entire area around the Saarschleife is largely covered by a forest that is largely untouched. A beech forest grows on the remnants of the colored sandstone while hornbeam and oaks predominate on quartzite. On the steep slopes, the forests transition into a bush forest of hornbeam and oak. Due to the favorable climate, the evergreen sub-Mediterranean Atlantic holly grows here. Only lichens and mosses settle on the so-called "Rosseln" the scree heaps created by weathering.

== History ==
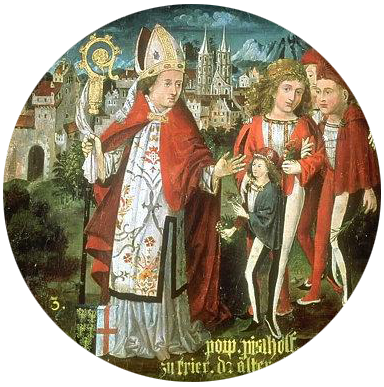
Archbishop Poppo von Babenberg (Babenberger Family Tree, Stiftsgalerie Klosterneuburg, Niederösterreich)

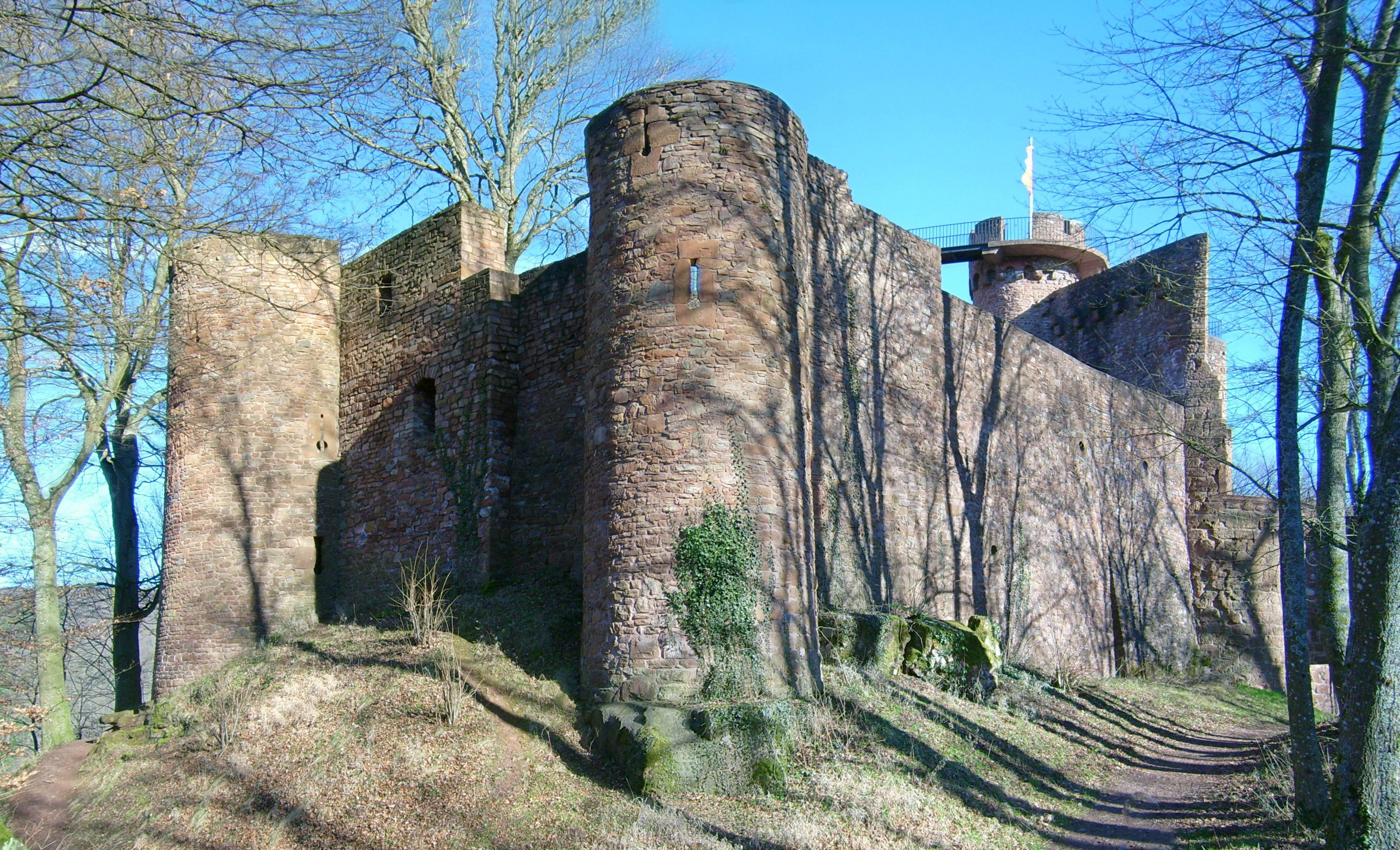
Ruins of Castle Montclair

The advantage offered by a spur surrounded by a river attracted the original Celtic inhabitants of the area to erect a protective wall that lies two kilometers to the east of the ruins of Castle Montclair that dates from the Middle Ages. It is likely that the spur of the Saarschleife was used by these Celts as a refuge castle. On the escarpment, traces of a Roman presence have also been found. During a period of great migration following the fall of the Roman Empire and the establishment of Francia, a noble family from Ardennes erected Skiva Castle (also recorded as "Skipha" or "Sissiva") on the spur around 1000 AD. The inhabitants of the castle were in constant conflict with their feudal lords, the archbishops of Trier. In 1016, Poppo von Babenberg, the Archbishop of Trier, succeeded in taking and destroying the castle.

Nearly two centuries later in 1180, Arnold I., another Archbishop of Trier, authorized the construction of a new castle on the grounds. Given the name Montclair (Latin "mons clarus" or "bright mountain"), the castle's construction was completed in 1190. Over the course of time, the castle fell into the hands of the Duchy of Lorraine and was subsequently destroyed during a conflict in 1351 with the Erzstift of Trier. Some 75 years later, the von Sierck family obtained the right to build a much smaller castle on the site. This second Castle Montclair was left to ruin in 1620. In 1661, King Louis XIV of France reached an agreement with the Archbishop of Trier Karl Kaspar von der Leyen to leave the castle ruined since it would be useful in case of a war with France. As a result, the castle's remains would only be stabilized two centuries later when Frederick William IV of Prussia initiated preservation efforts upon his first stay in Mettlach in 1835.

During the Third Reich, plans were drawn up to turn the area near Castle Montclair into an Ordensburg that would have encompassed 170 hectares. The proposed facility would have included a Thingstätte to hold 4000, a tower, a "Hall of Honor for the Victims on the Saar" as well as a school building for 600 students stretching out over 800 meters. The plans for the massive complex were drawn up by Clemens Klotz, the Cologne-based architect who built the Kraft durch Freude facilities of Prora on the island of Rügen as well as the Vogelsang Ordensburg in the Eifel region, and the responsibility for the project's planning fell to Robert Ley, the NSDAP Reichsleiter, and the German Labor Front. The planned complex was announced as a gift of gratitude to the inhabitants of the Saarland following the results of the 1935 Saar status referendum. However, because of military activities involved in fortifying Germany's western border (the Westwall), construction of the Ordensburg was indefinitely delayed, and the Saarland ultimately received instead the "Gautheater Saarbrücken" known today as the Saarländische Staatstheater in Saarbrücken.

== Treetop walk and observation tower ==
On 23 July 2016 the Treetop Walk Saarschleife opened to the public with an observation tower soaring above the historically popular vantage point known as "the Cloef." From the observation tower, visitors can see much further than from the Cloef including the Mettlach parish church as well as the power plant at Ensdorf.

== Famous visits ==
The Saarschleife is considered the symbol of the Saarland and is frequently the site of visits by heads-of-state, politicians, and celebrities. King Friedrich Wilhelm of Prussia visited the observation point at Cloef on 29 September 1856. On 16 May 1939 Adolf Hitler also visited the Bend in the Saar and a commemorative plaque of the visit was later removed. Oskar Lafontaine and Gerhard Schröder were photographed together during a visit on 4 August 1997. Nearly a decade later, the former presidents of France and Poland Jacques Chirac and Lech Kaczyński met for a three-party summit with Angela Merkel on 5 December 2006.

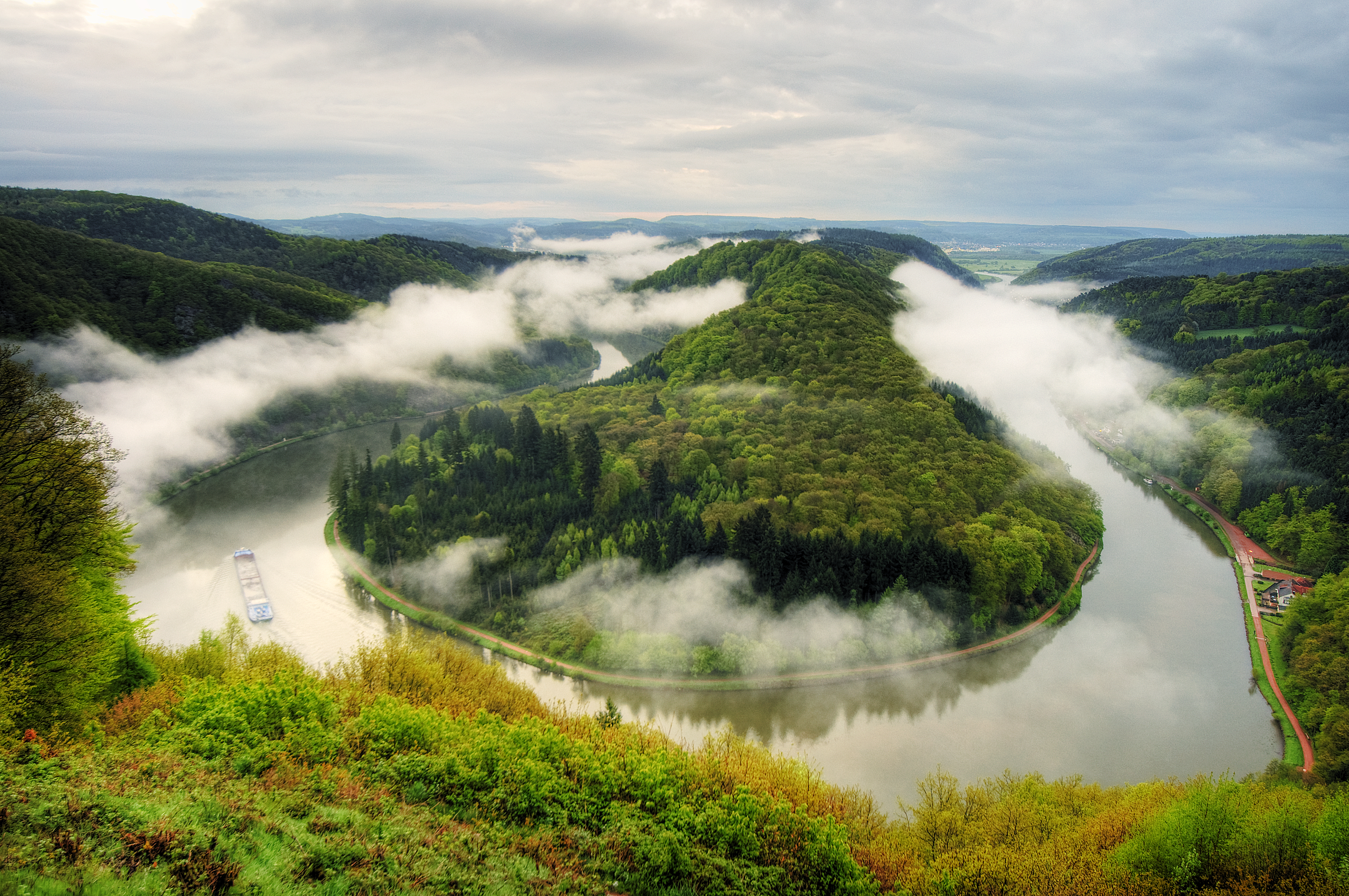
View of the Saarschleife from the Cloef

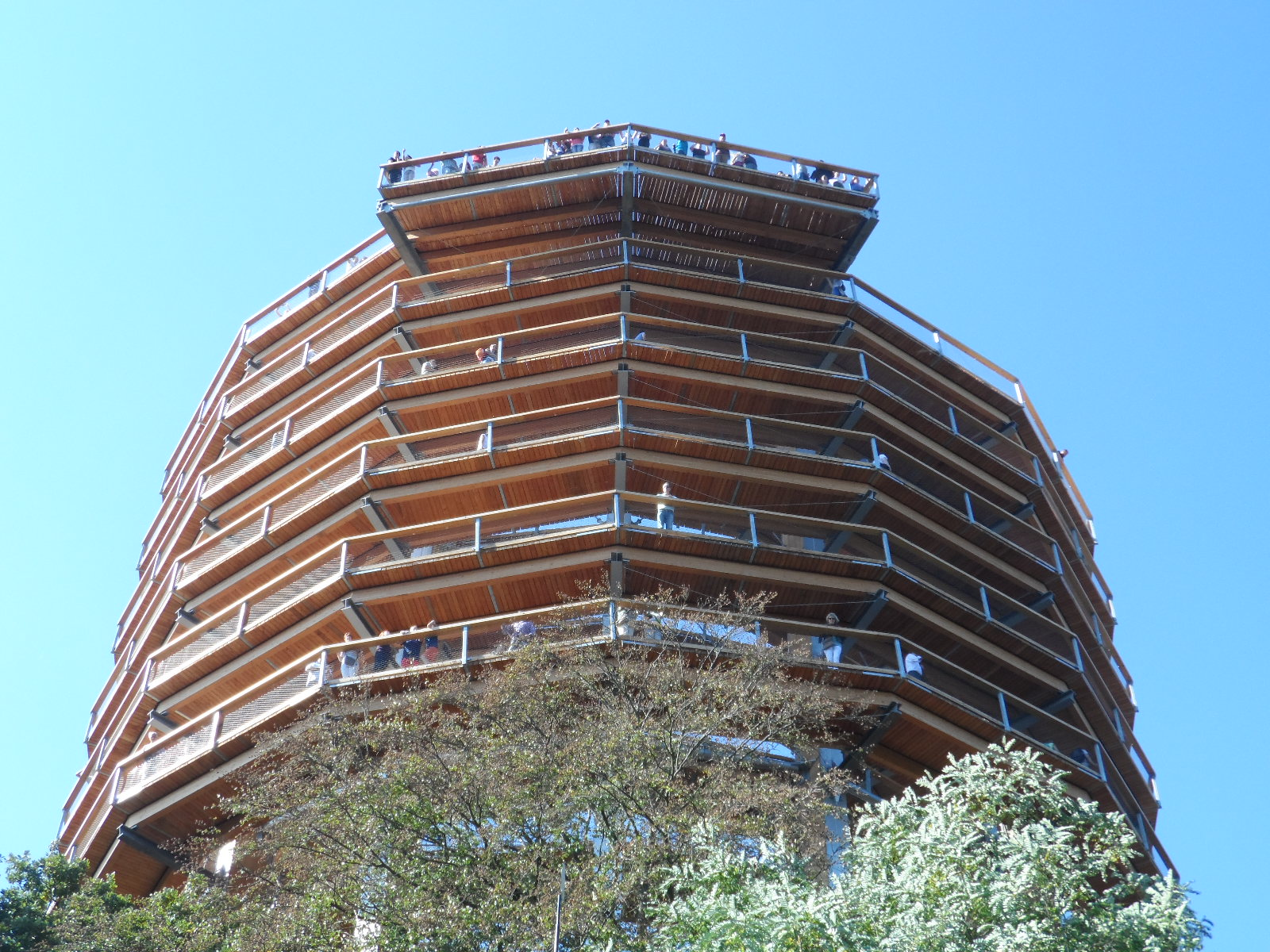
Observation tower of the Treetop Walk Saarschleife

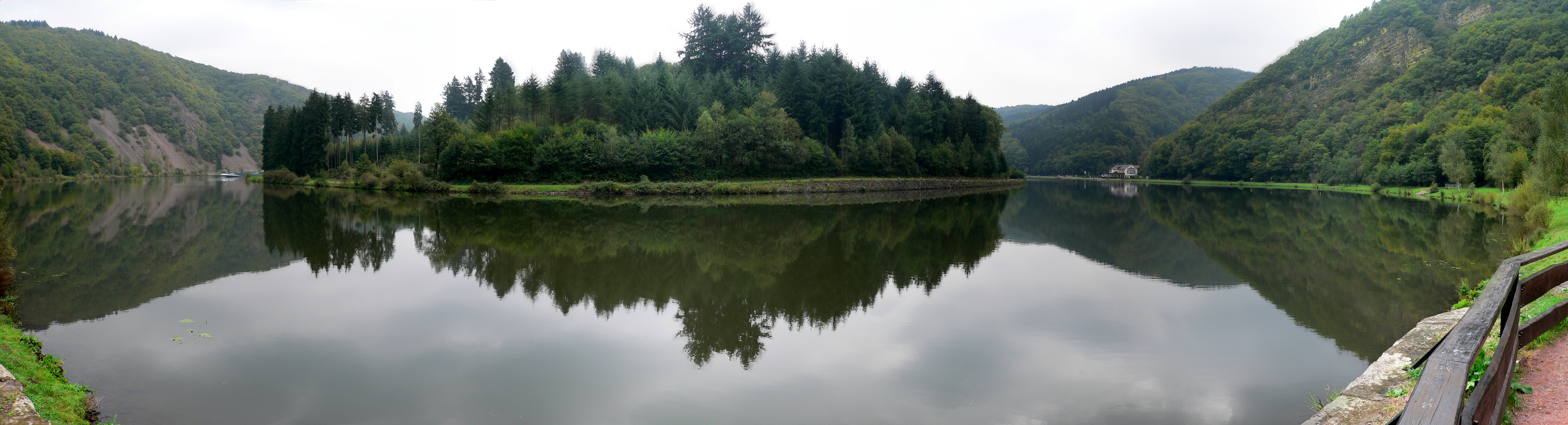
Saarschleife panorama from the banks of the Saar

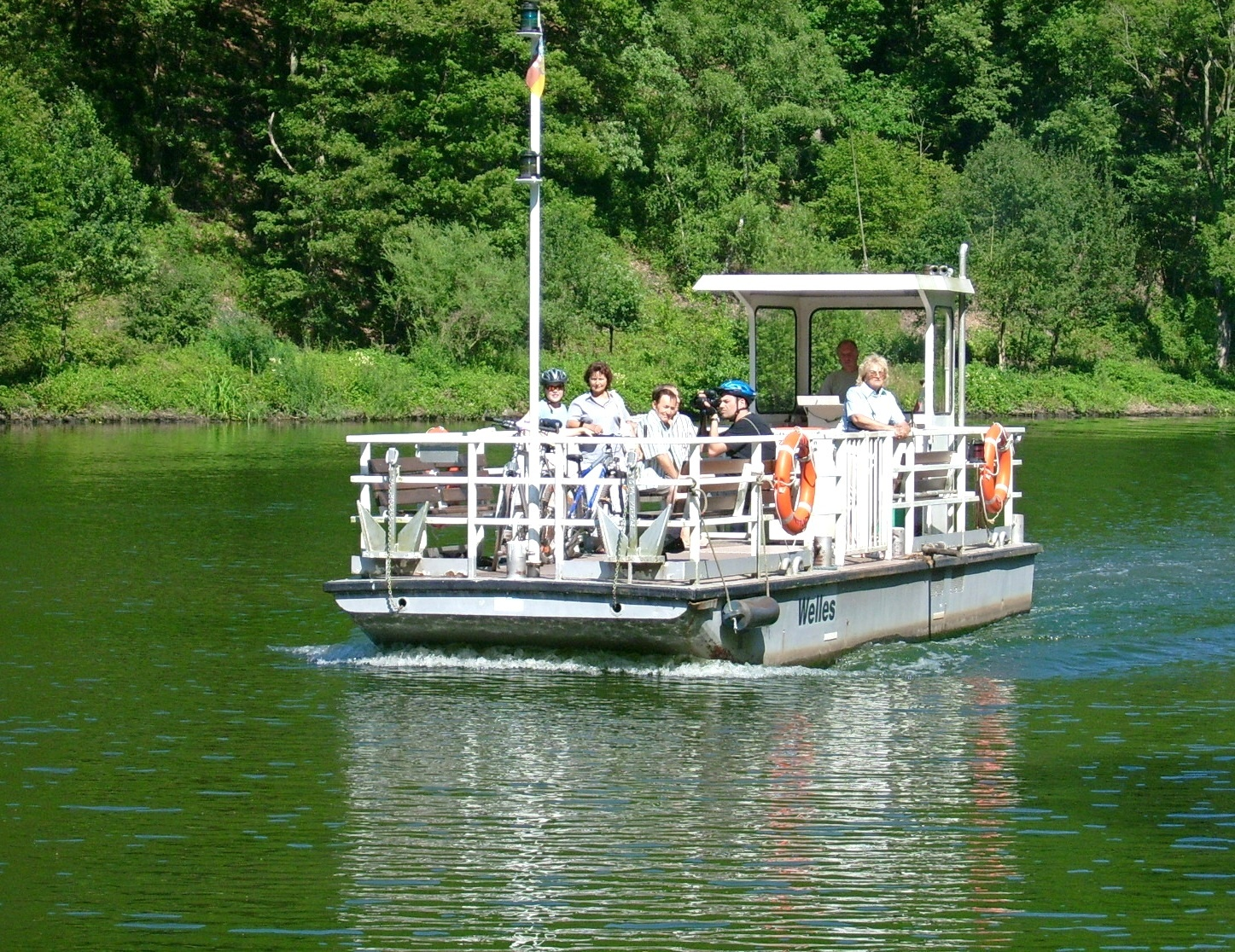
The ferry ship Welles transports passengers across the Saar near the Saarschleife.

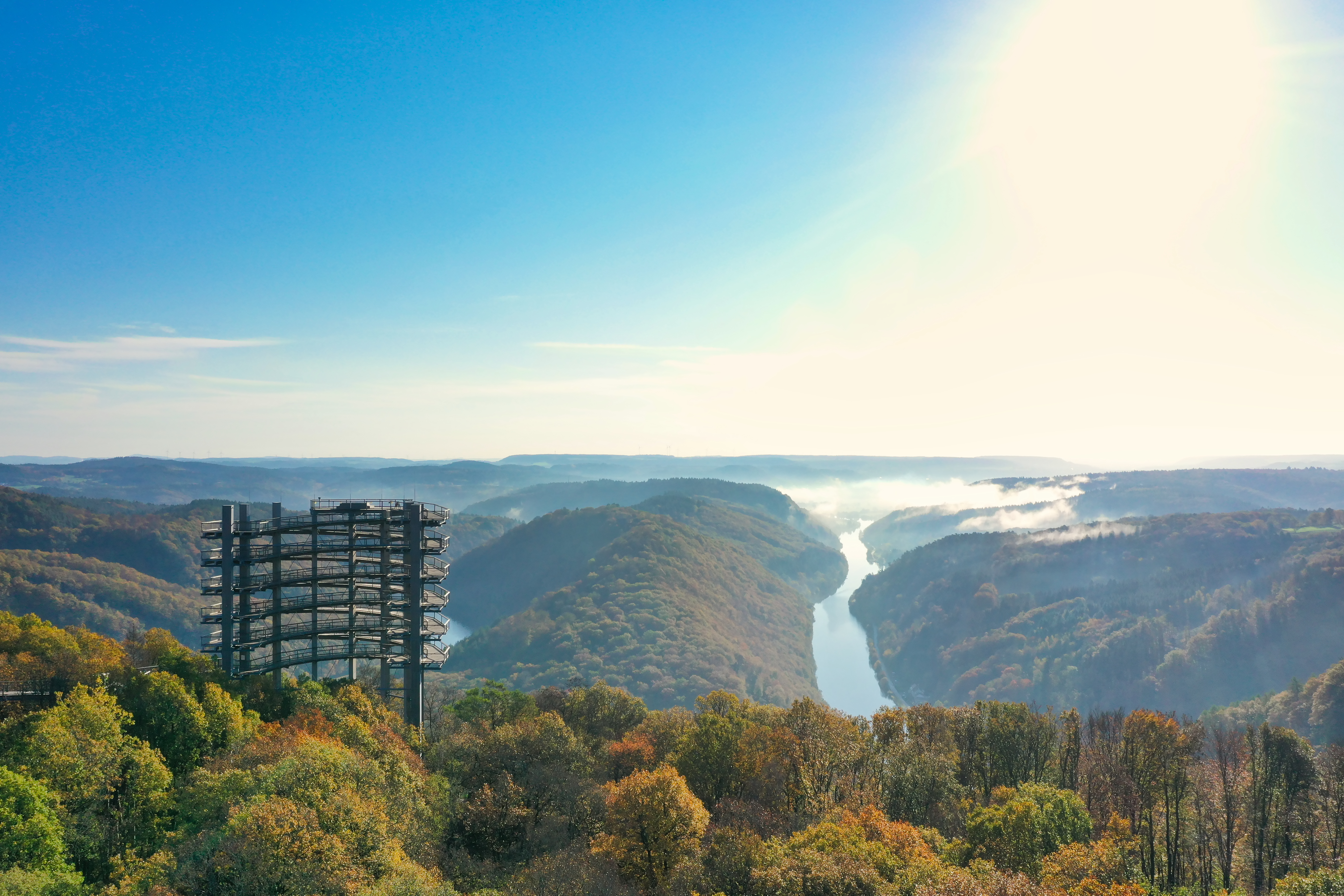
Observation tower on the Treetop Walk Saarschleife

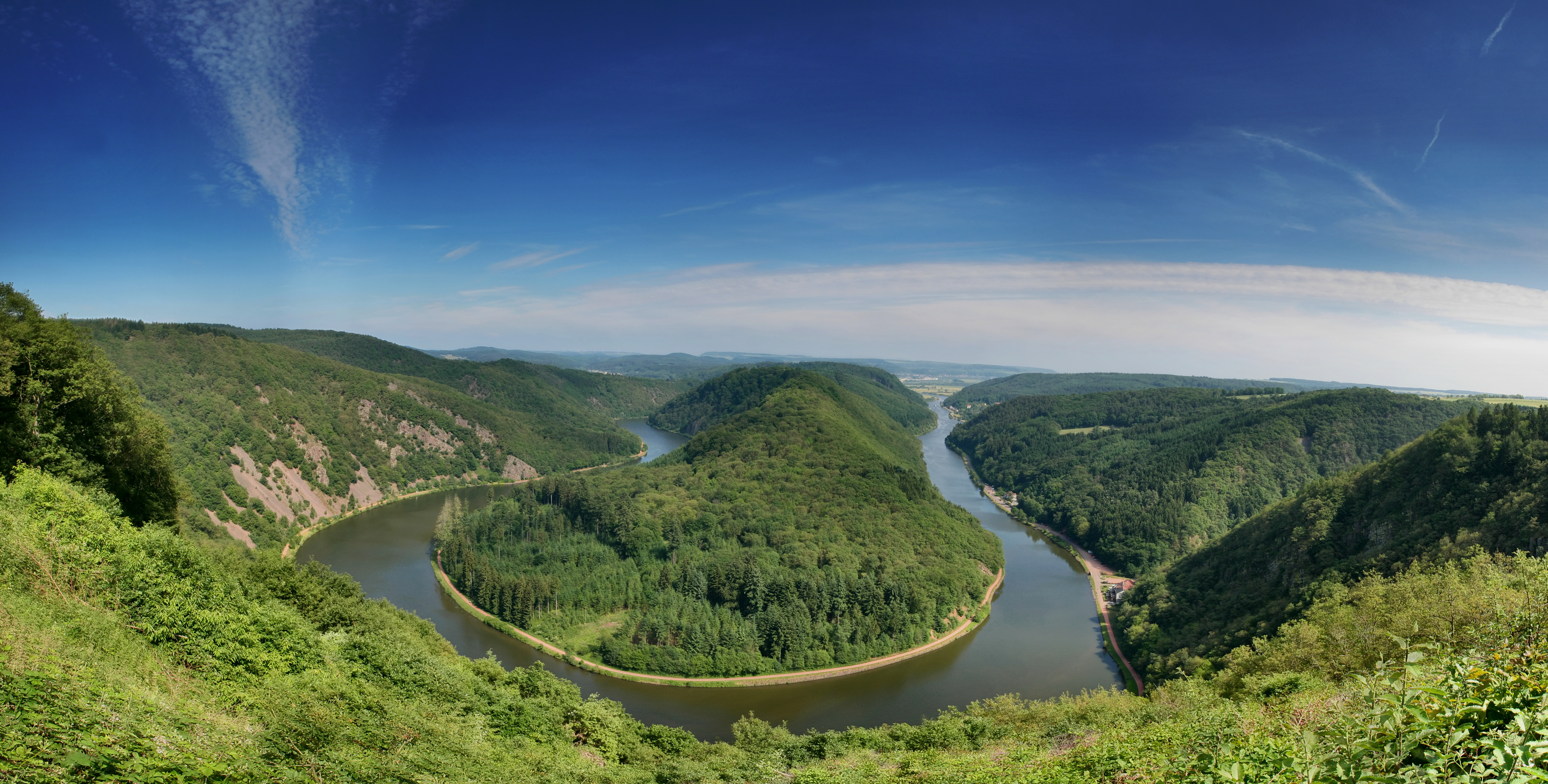
Panoramic View of Saarschleife seen from Cloef
