= VDNKh =

VDNKh may refer to:

- The name of the exhibition centers in former Soviet Republics
  - VDNKh (Russia), known as All-Russia Exhibition Center in 1992–2014
  - National Complex Expocenter of Ukraine (formerly "VDNH of the Ukrainian SSR")
  - Exhibition Pavilion, Minsk (formerly "VDNKh of the Byelorussian SSR")
- VDNKh (Moscow Metro), a Moscow Metro station
