= Mettlach =

- Municipality
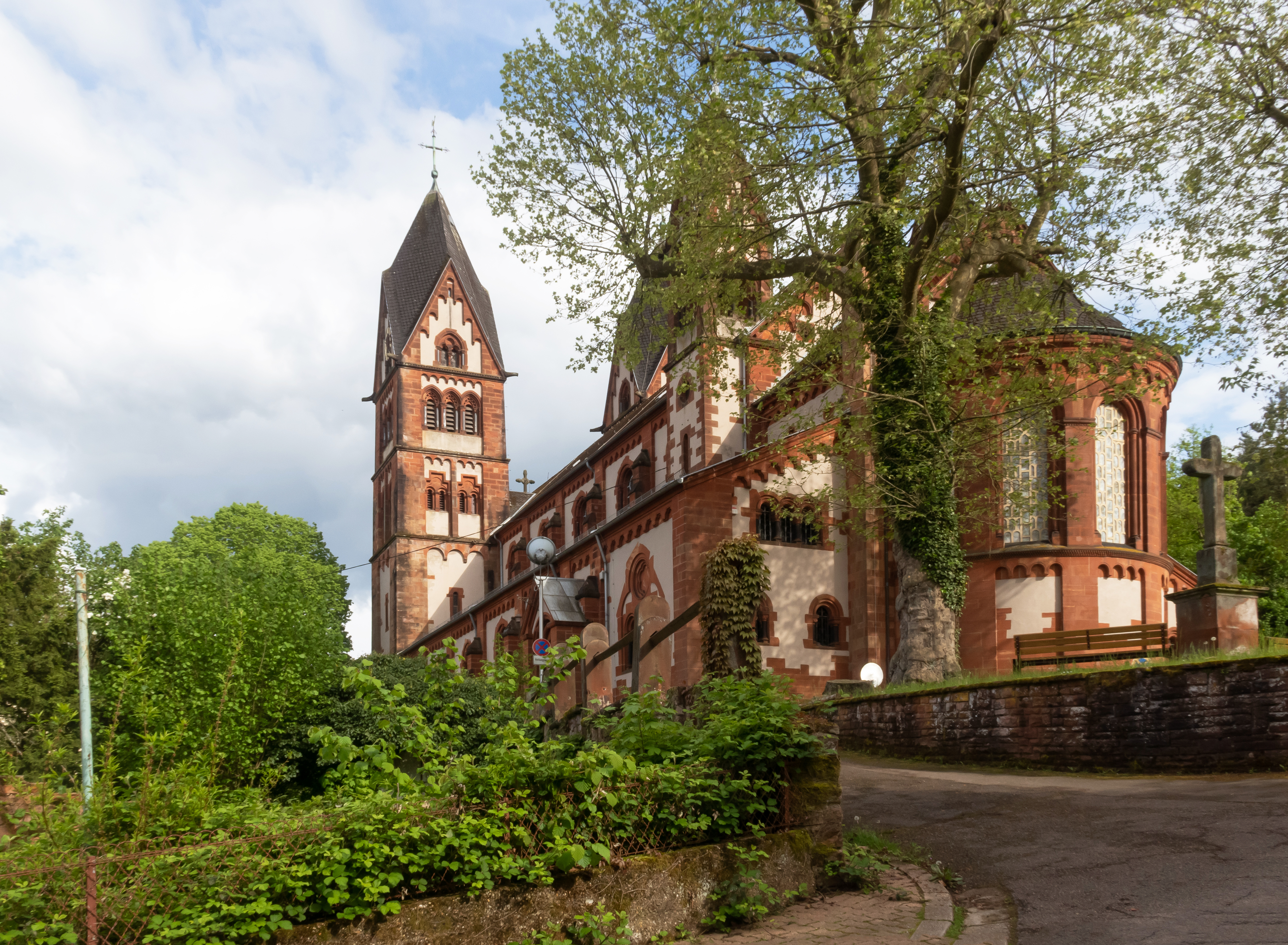
- Kirche St. Lutwinus in Mettlach

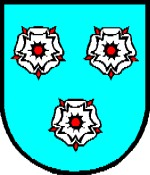
- Coat of arms

- Location of Mettlach within Merzig-Wadern district
- Interactive map of Mettlach
- Location within Germany Location within Saarland
- Coordinates: 49°29′39.2″N 6°36′18.7″E
- Country: Germany
- State: Saarland
- District: Merzig-Wadern
- Subdivisions: 10

Government
  - Mayor (2016–26): Daniel Kiefer (SPD)

Area
  - Total: 77.82 km^{2} (30.05 sq mi)
- Elevation: 154–451 m (505–1,480 ft)

Population (2025-12-31)
  - Total: 12,478
  - Density: 160.3/km^{2} (415.3/sq mi)
- Time zone: UTC+01:00 (CET)
  - Summer (DST): UTC+02:00 (CEST)
- Postal codes: 66693
- Dialling codes: 06864
- Vehicle registration: MZG
- Website: www.mettlach.de

Mettlach (German pronunciation: [ˈmɛtlax]; Moselle Franconian: Mettlich) is a municipality in the district Merzig-Wadern, in Saarland, Germany, situated on the river Saar, approximately 7 km (4.3 mi) northwest of Merzig, and 30 km (19 mi) south of Trier. The headquarters of Villeroy & Boch are in Mettlach. Also, the Mettlach tiles are named after the municipality.

== Municipalities ==
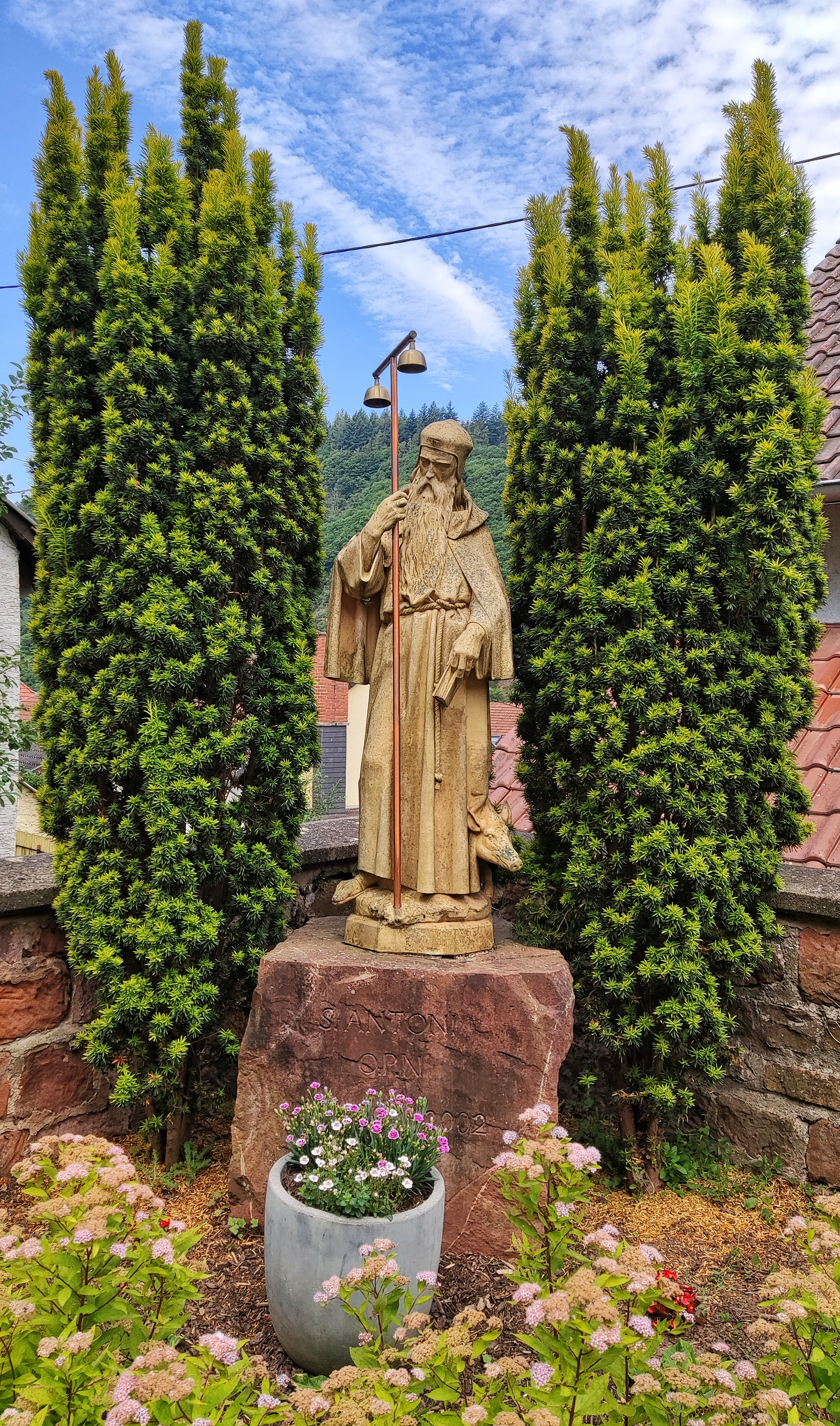
Monument dedicated to St. Antonius in Saarhölzbach

The population of the present city, including all outlying districts (as of 31 December 2015):

Municipality	Population
Bethingen	250
Dreisbach	159
Faha	339
Mettlach	3.192
Nohn	689
Orscholz	3.664
Saarhölzbach	1.623
Tünsdorf	894
Wehingen	477
Weiten	1.163

== Sights ==
- Castle Montclair within the Saarschleife
- Castle Saareck
- Castle Ziegelberg
- Chapel of St. Joseph
- Cloef-Atrium (conference and visitor center) in Orscholz
- Cultural-historical exhibition in the adventure center of Villeroy & Boch
- Old abbey
- Old tower
- Parish Church of St. Gangolf
- Parish Church of St. Hubertus, with Gothic Revival organ
- Parish Church of St. Lutwinus, with alabaster choir star unique in Germany
- Saarschleife at the Cloef
- Stoneware museum

== Gallery ==
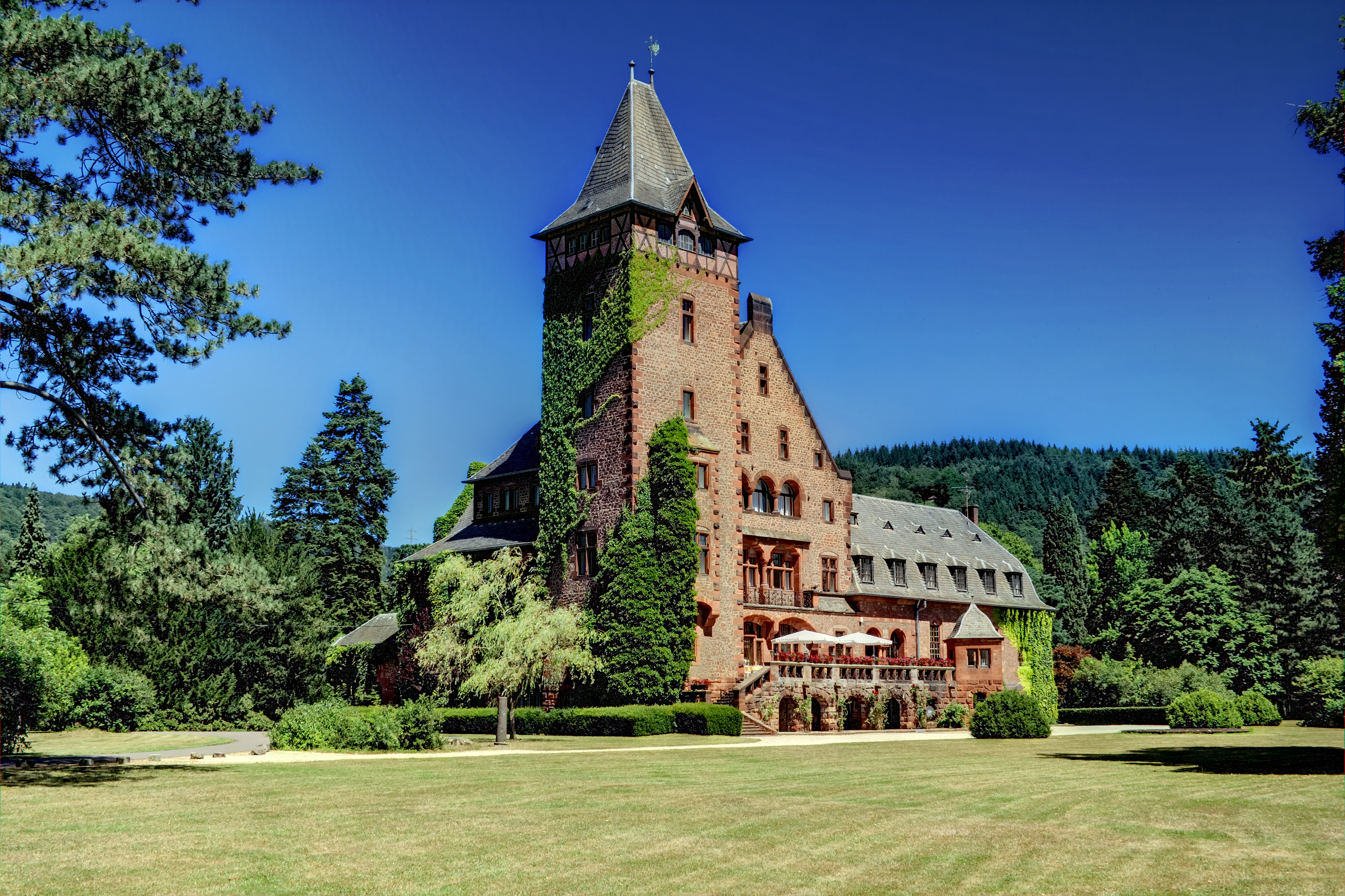
Schloss Saareck (Castle Saareck)

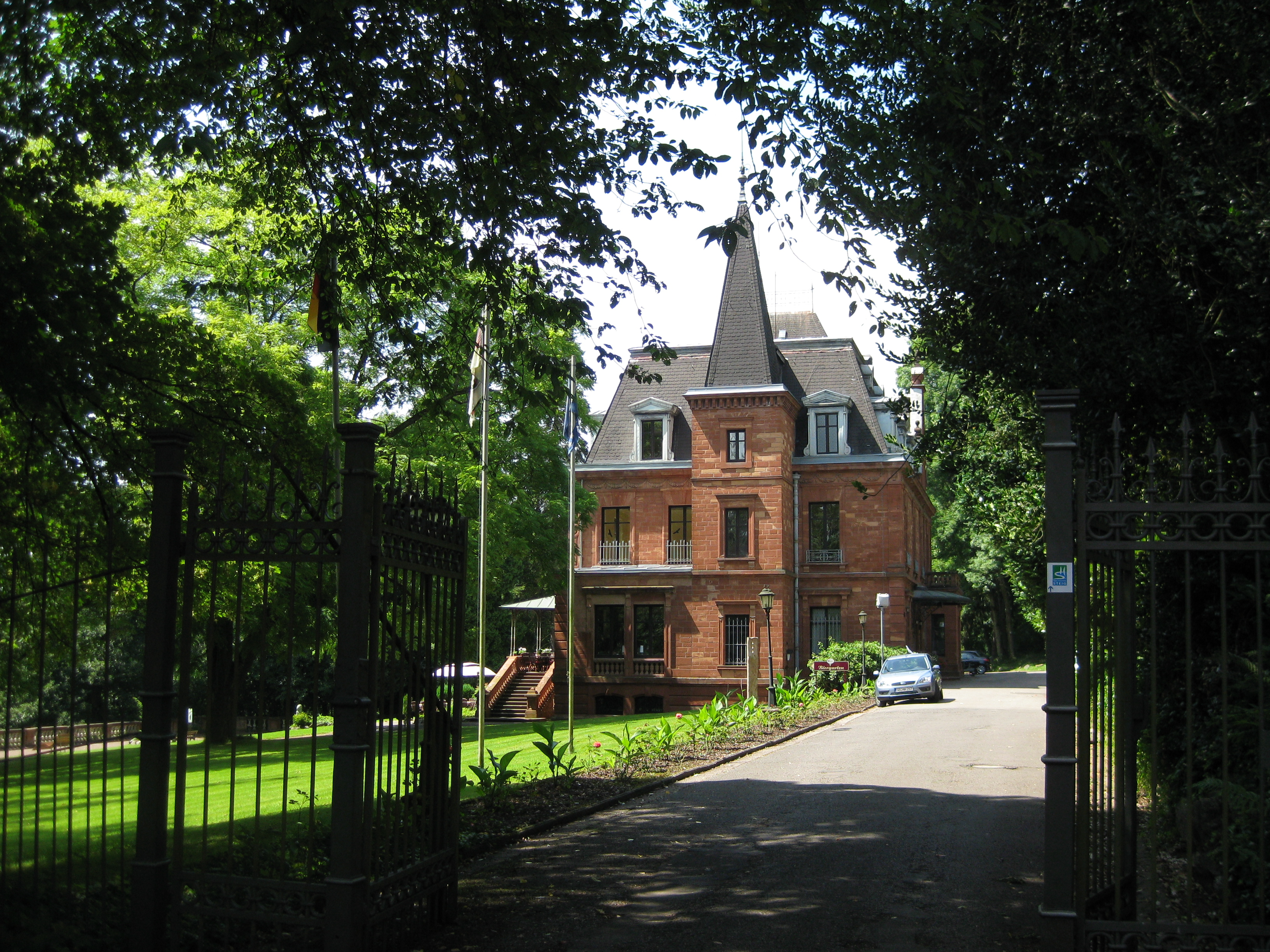
Schloss Ziegelberg (Castle Ziegelberg)

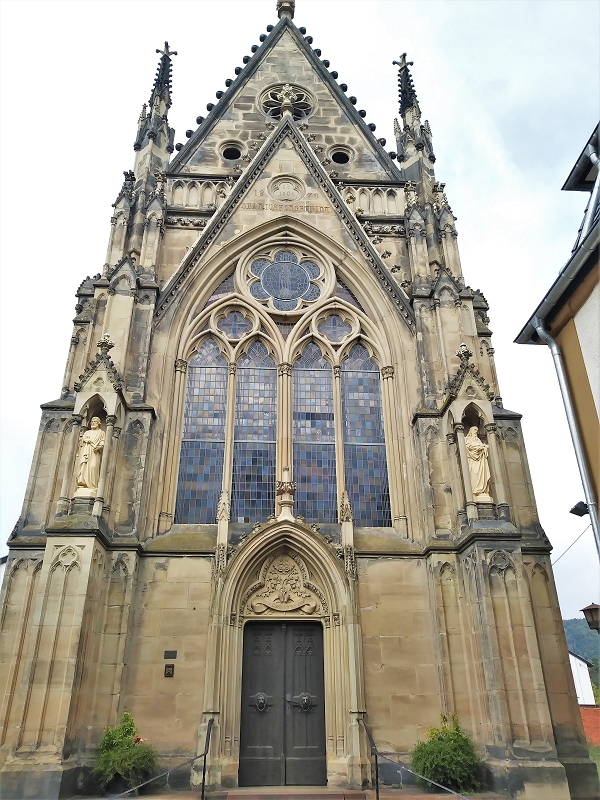
Kapelle St. Joseph (Chapel of St. Joseph)

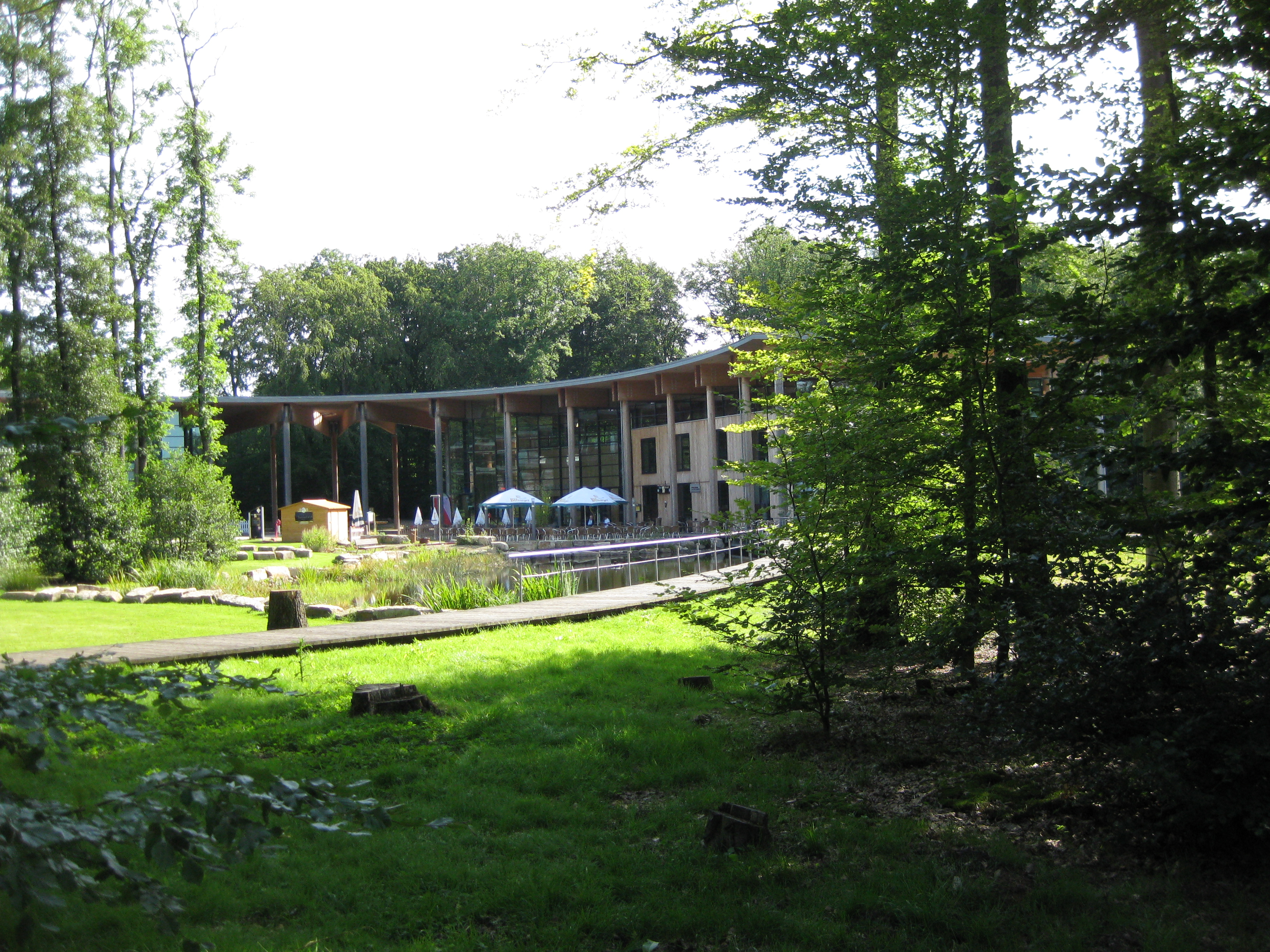
Cloef-Atrium

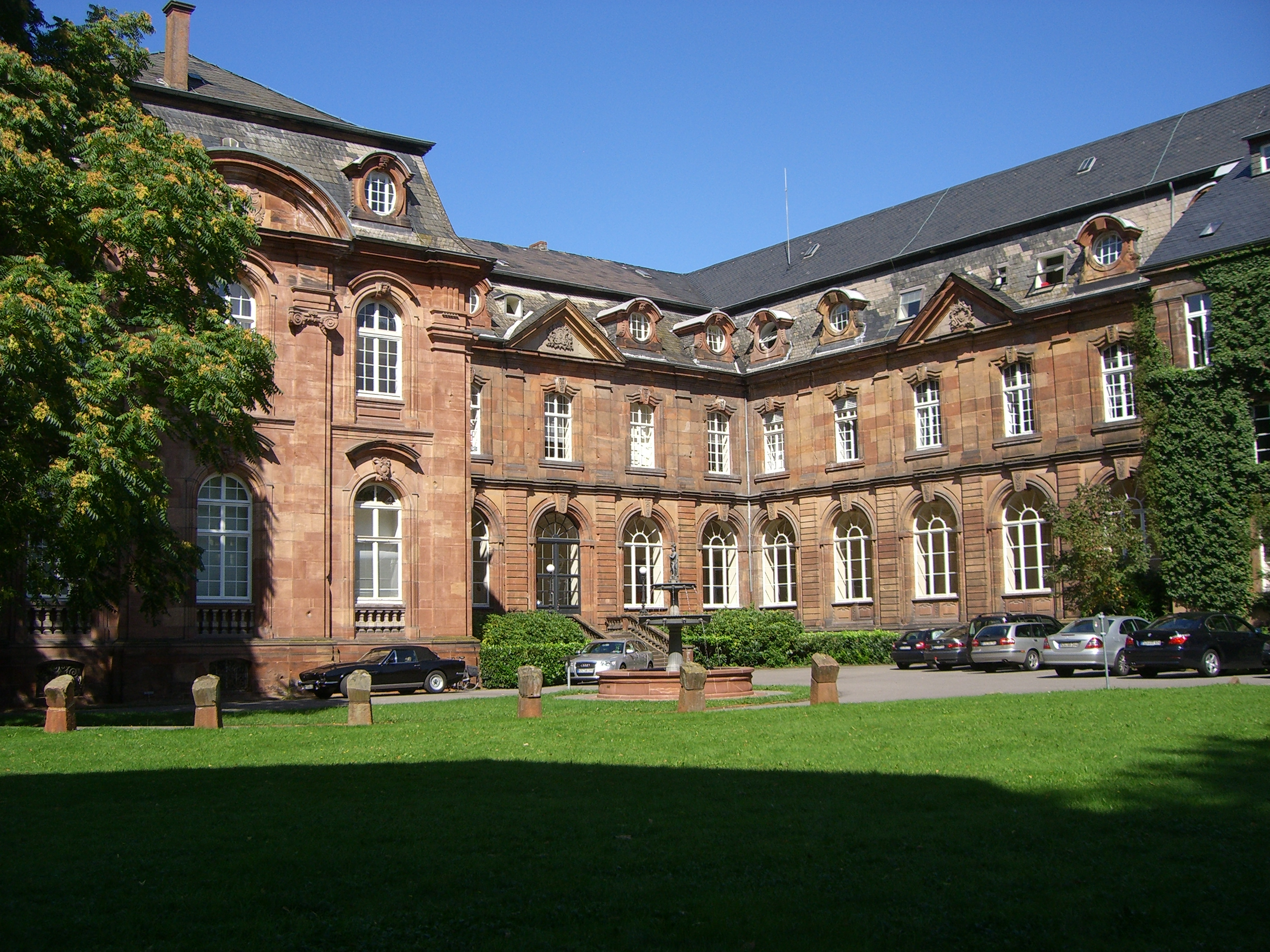
Old Abbey (rear view)

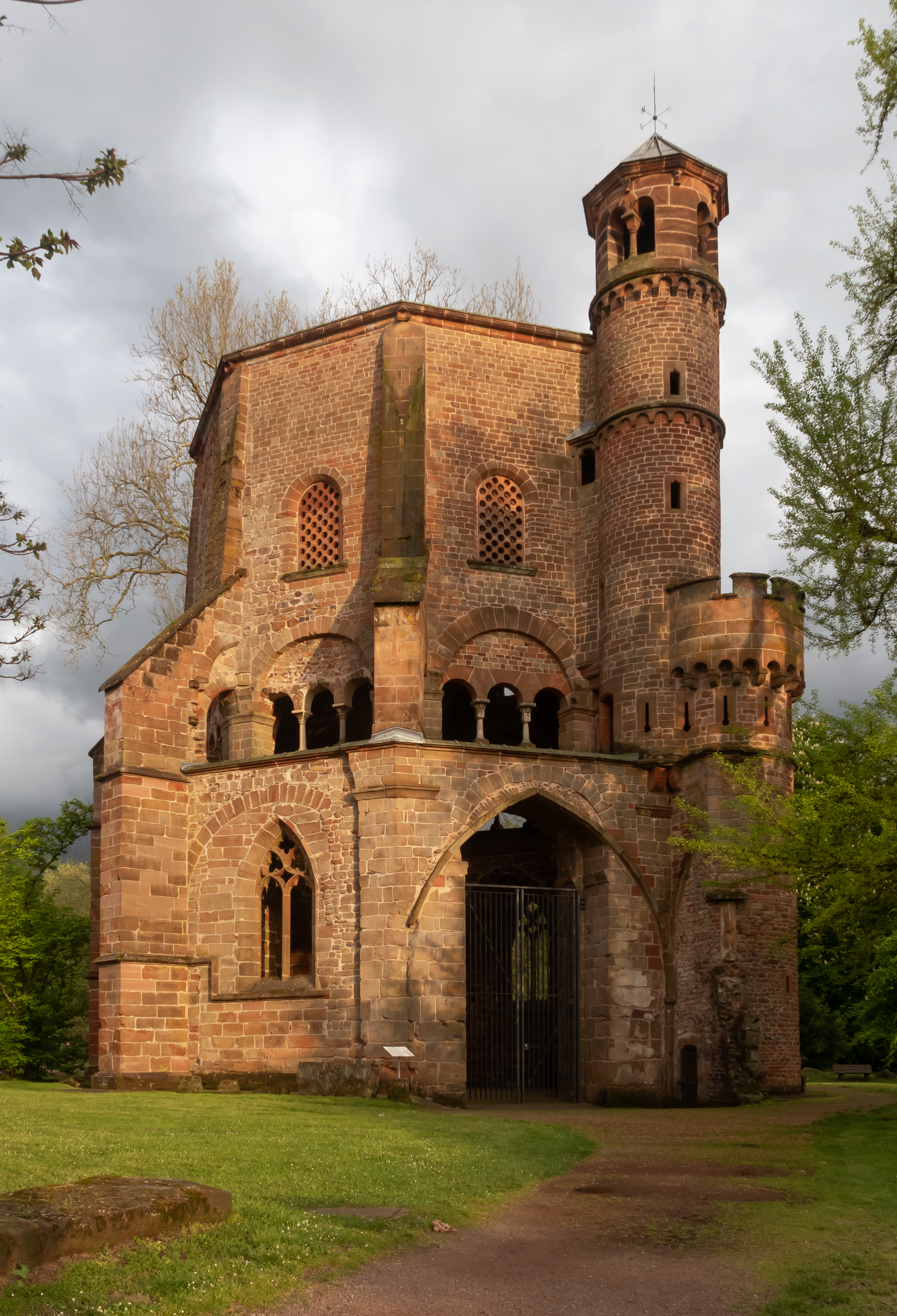
Alter Turm (old tower)

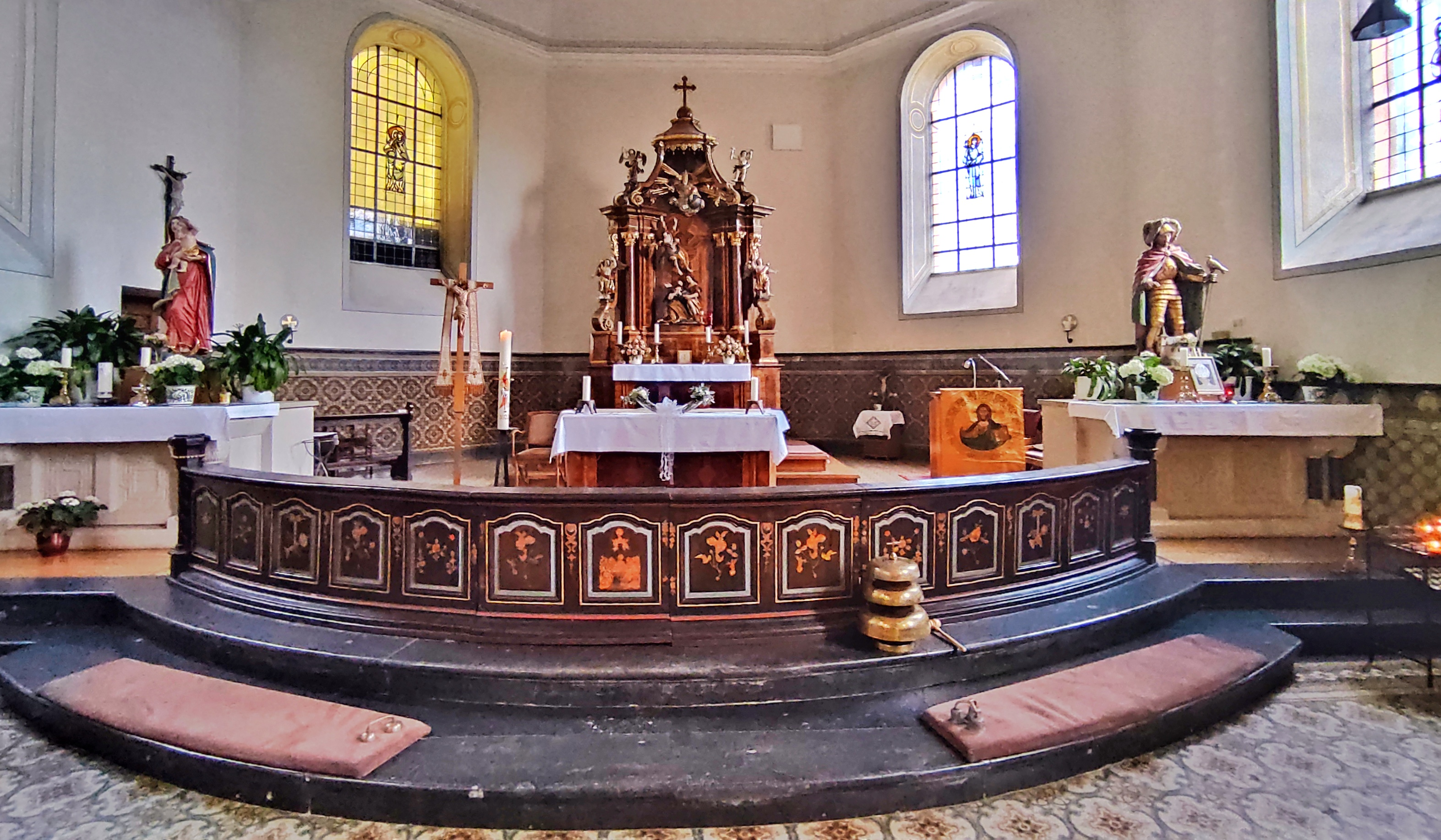
Church of St. Gangolf

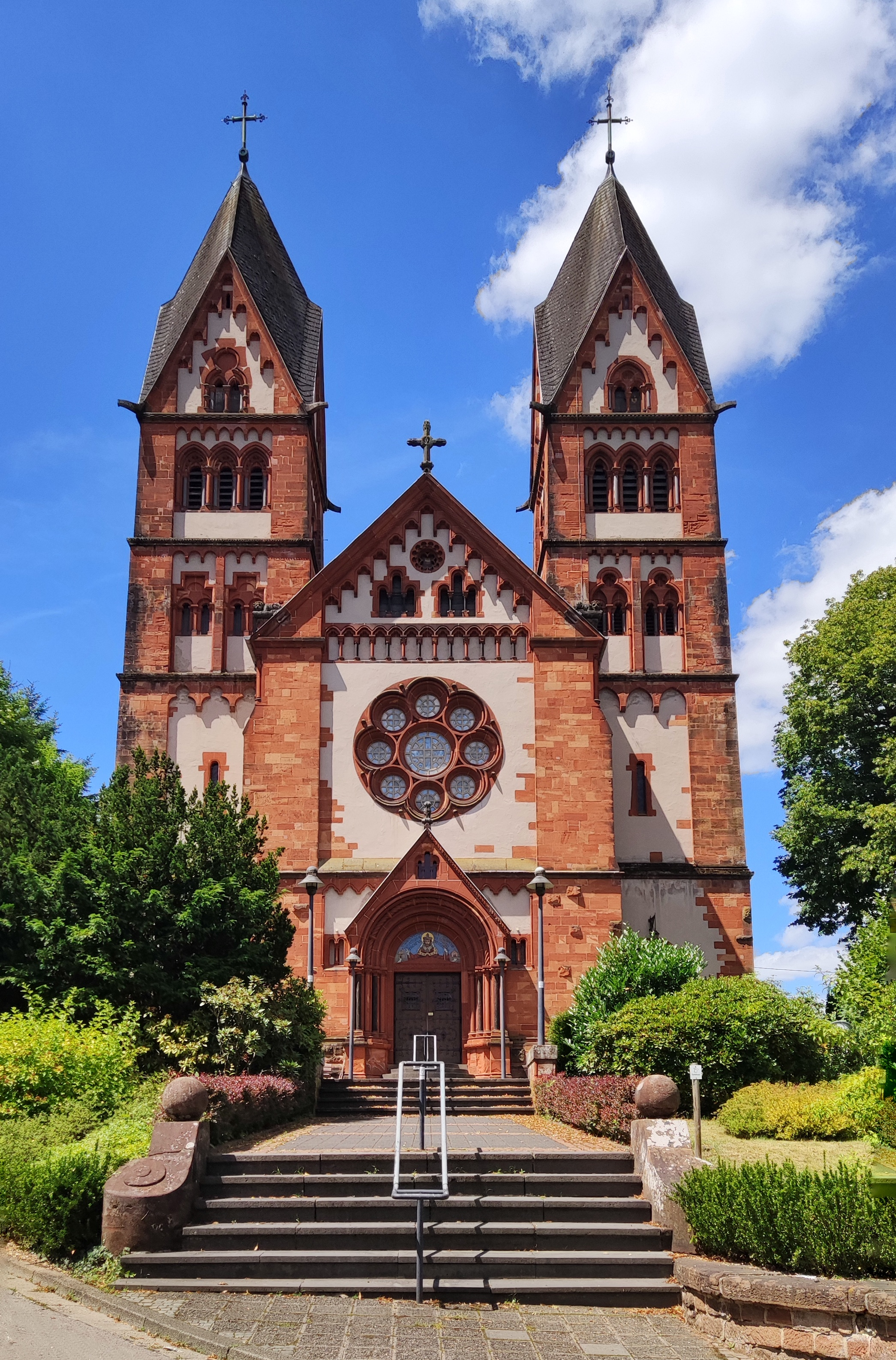
St. Lutwinus' Church

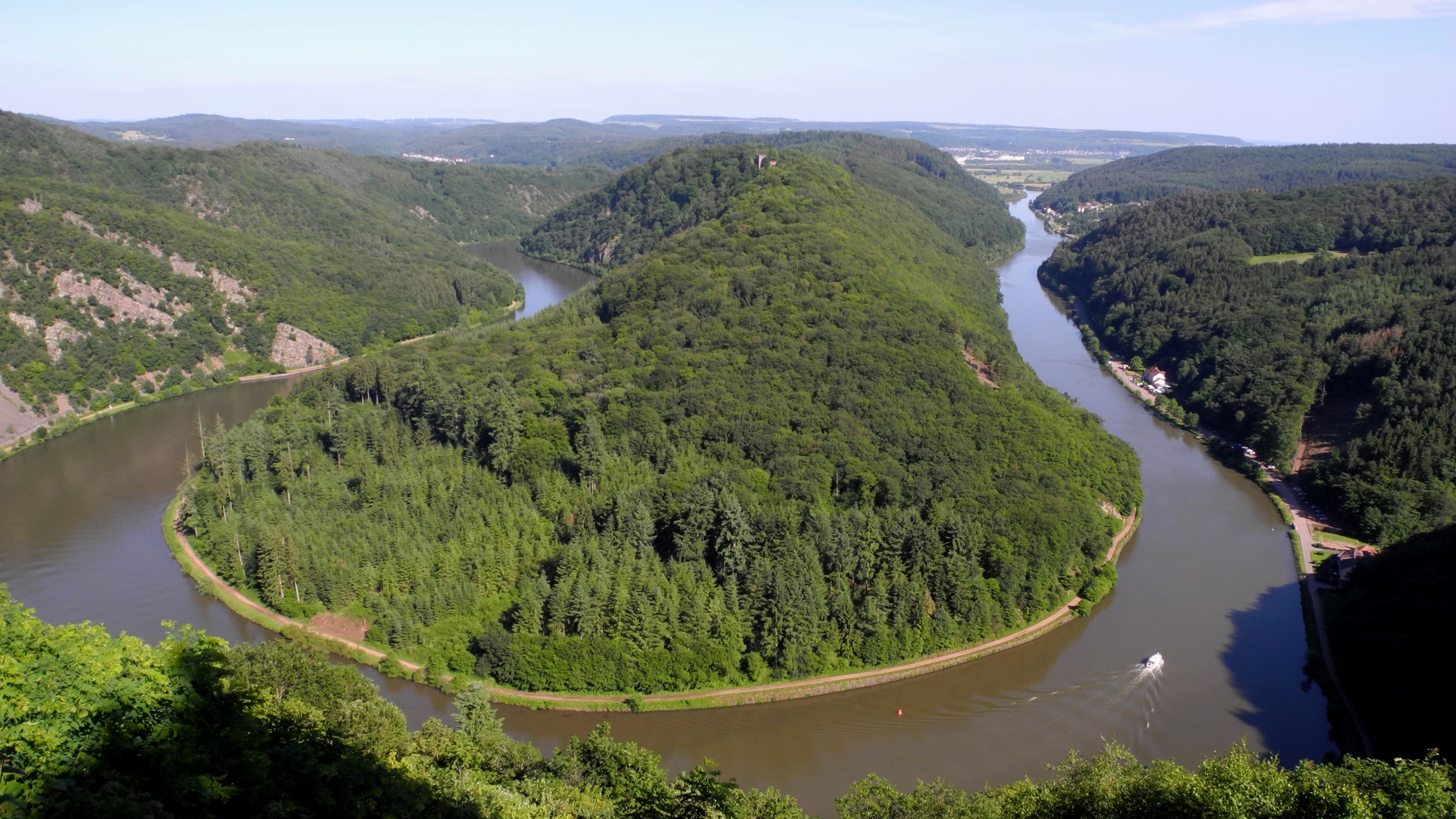
Saarschleife at the Cloef

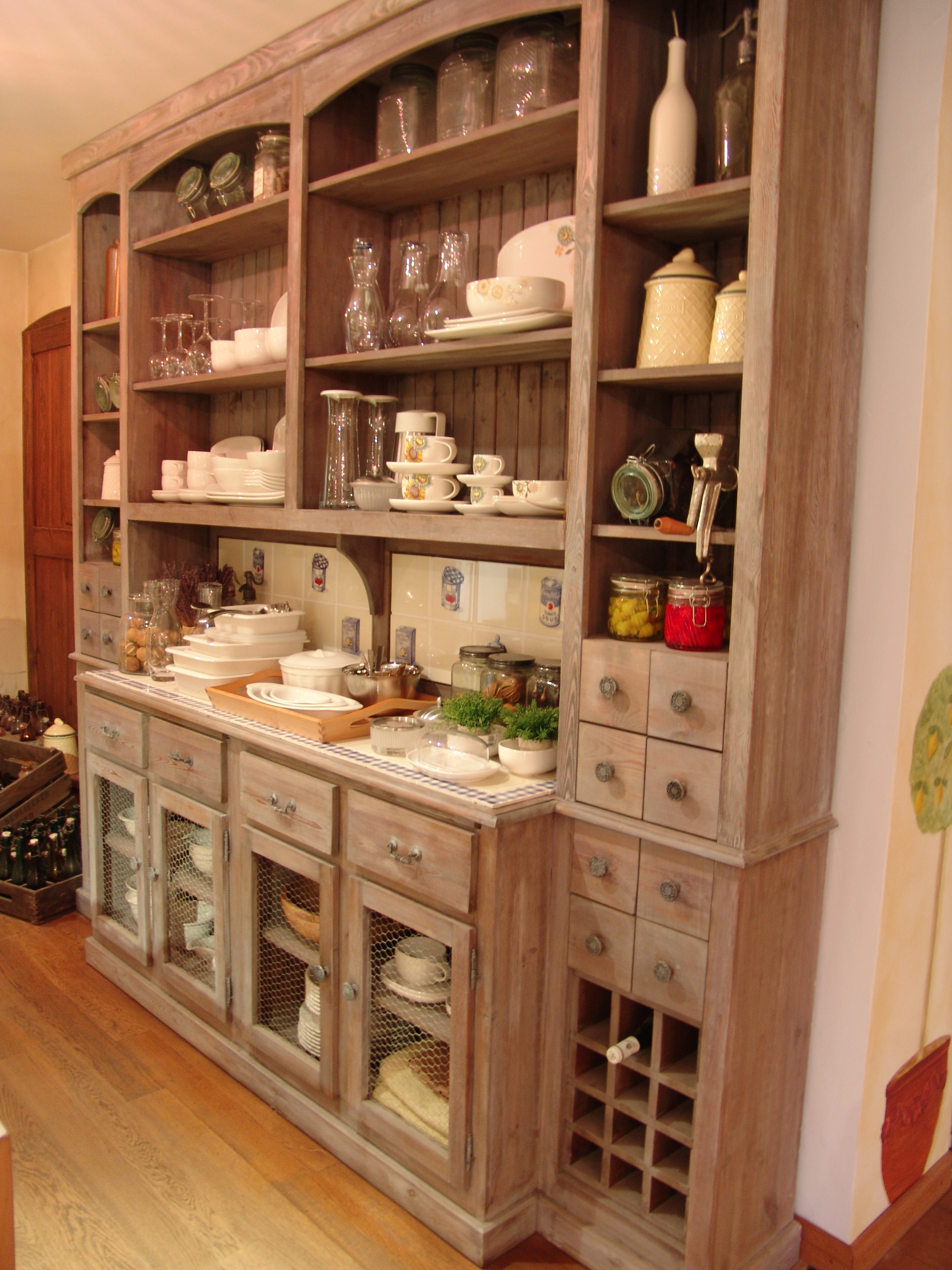
Stoneware Museum
