= West Coast Wilderness Trail =

New Zealand cycling and tramping trail

Coordinates: 42.448°S 171.215°E

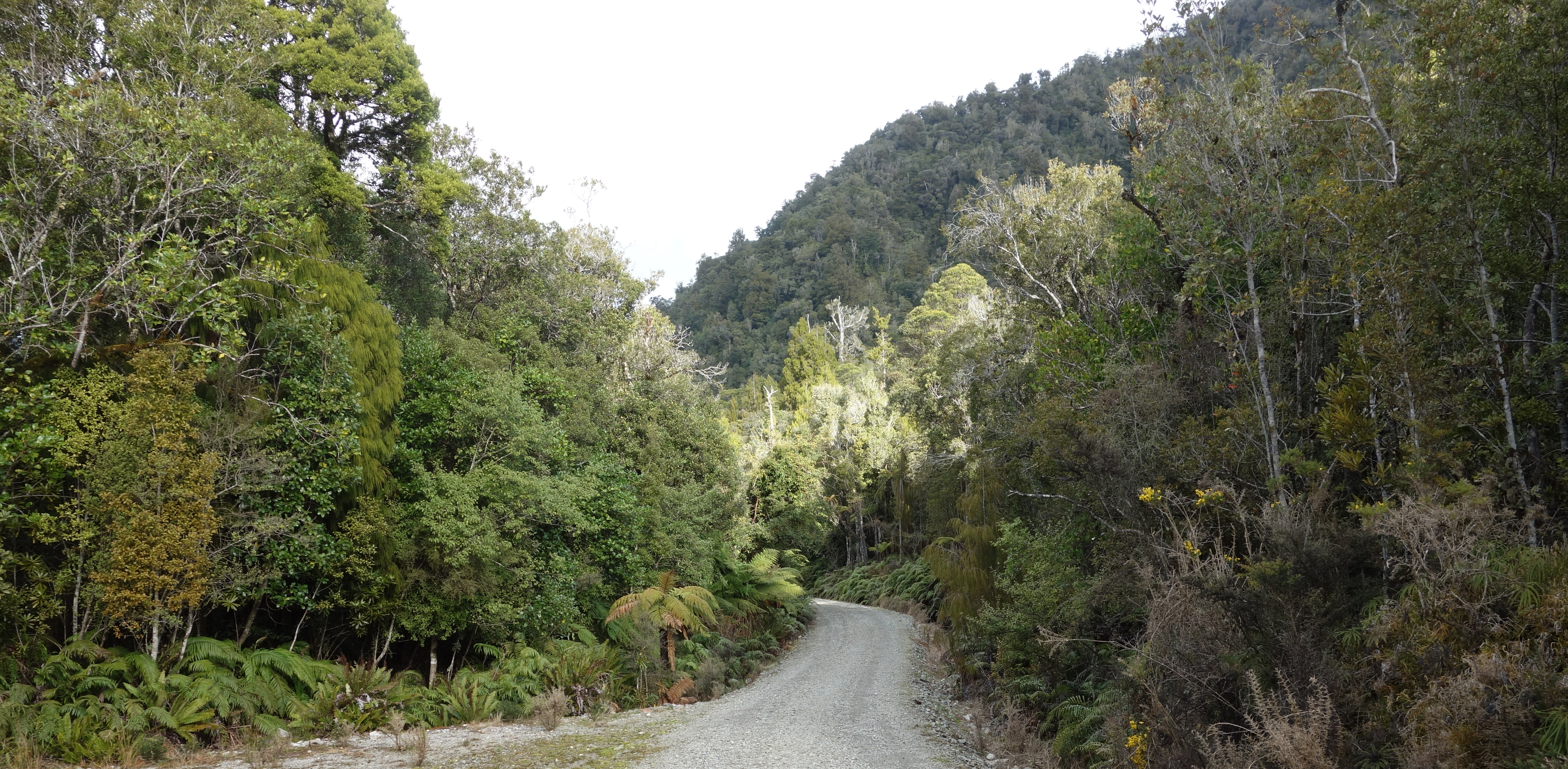
- The West Coast Wilderness Trail shortly before Cowboy Paradise
- Length: 139 km (86 mi)
- Location: West Coast, New Zealand
- Trailheads: Greymouth / Ross
- Use: Walking; Cycling
- Highest point: 319 m
- Difficulty: Easy to intermediate
- Season: Year round
- Sights: West Coast gold rush relics Rainforest historic Hokitika; West Coast Treetop Walk
- Hazards: some roads shared with traffic Taramakau River Bridge (prior to clip on construction)
- Website: West Coast Wilderness Trail; New Zealand Cycle Trail

The West Coast Wilderness Trail has been funded as one of the projects of the New Zealand Cycle Trail. Once complete, the 139 kilometres (86 mi) track will connect Greymouth in the north with Ross in the south.

== History ==
The overall New Zealand Cycle Trail project is a joint initiate between the National Government and the Green Party, based on their memorandum of understanding. The joint sponsors are John Key in his function as Minister of Tourism, and Kevin Hague representing the Greens. The first section of the trail, from Greymouth to Hokitika, was officially opened by Key and Hague on 23 November 2013 at Kumara's Theatre Royal Hotel, on the first anniversary of the reopening of the historic hotel. There have been delays with the last section to Ross, and as of August 2015, the target opening date for this remaining section is Labour weekend in 2015 (the Monday of Labour weekend falls onto 26 October).

== Route description ==
The trail can be ridden in three or four days, but the standard route description is for four sections. The trail is mostly ridden from north to south. On the New Zealand Cycling Trail website, slightly over three-quarters of the trail are shown as grade 2 (easy), with the remainder as grade 3 (intermediate). The detailed description below uses the grading used by Jonathan Kennett.

=== Greymouth to Kumara ===
The official start of the track is on the Grey River stopbank in Greymouth next to the historic railway signal box. The track then follows the coast up to the Taramakau River. There, trail users are currently required to use the Taramakau River Bridge, which is the last remaining combined road-rail bridge in the South Island. A clip on is under construction by civil contractor Fulton Hogan, due to open later in 2015, and as an interim measure, rubber safety mats have been installed that seal the groove between the rail tracks. From there, the track goes inland towards Kumara, following an old tram line. The 30 kilometres (19 mi) section is grade 1.

=== Kumara to Cowboy Paradise ===
From Kumara, the track gently ascends towards the Southern Alps. It goes past water races built during the time of the West Coast gold rush, today used for electricity generation. The route utilises a historic pack track in the Kawhaka Valley, and Kawhaka Pass at 317 metres (1,040 ft) is the highest point of the trail. From the pass, it is a further 5 kilometres (3.1 mi) to the replica western town that has been named Cowboy Paradise by its owner. The 37 kilometres (23 mi) section is grade 2+.

=== Cowboy Paradise to Hokitika ===
From Cowboy Paradise, there is 4 kilometres (2.5 mi) downhill towards the Arahura River. Kennett writes that the "downhill is so sweet you might feel like riding back up to repeat the experience!" The Arahura Valley is left via a "toughish" 1 kilometre (0.62 mi) climb, and this is followed by a descent towards Lake Kaniere. From there, a mixture of trail and road use leads to the settlement of Kaniere. Hokitika is reached via an old tramline next to the Hokitika River. The 36 kilometres (22 mi) section is grade 3- due to the steep climb out of the Arahura Valley.

=== Hokitika to Ross ===
The trail leaves Hokitika on the Hokitika River Bridge clip on towards the south. From here, much of the trail has yet to be built, and in some sections, cyclists have to use narrow shoulders on State Highway 6, which results in the current grade 4 rating (advanced). The trail, once built, will use an old tramline and go within 1 kilometre (0.62 mi) of the West Coast Treetop Walk near Lake Mahinapua. The side trip to the treetop walk is part of the official track route. South of here, the route will follow the old railway line to Ross, including the picturesque 200 metres (660 ft) rail bridge over the Totara River. Once the trail is completed, this last section of 36 kilometres (22 mi) will be grade 3.

== Economic impact ==
The cost of the project is NZ$8.6 million, which has been shared between the government's cycle trail fund (part of the government's tourism budget) and Development West Coast. Future maintenance costs are the responsibility of the two district councils involved, Grey District in the north and Westland District in the south. Annual maintenance budgets of NZ$30k and NZ$70k have been set by Grey and Westland Districts, respectively. One of the overall objectives of the New Zealand Cycle Trail project is "breathing new life into dying towns".

As of 2015, there are about 8,000 annual track users. Westland District expects 10,000 users in 2016, and 15,000 annual users within a few years. The West Coast is facing hard economic times, with the Pike River Mine disaster having taken its toll by not just having lost many lives, but also the closure of that mine. World coal prices are declining, and state coal miner Solid Energy was put into voluntary administration in August 2015. Many hotels and pubs on the coast are struggling, and some have recently been closed. An exception is the Kumara's Theatre Royal Hotel from 1876, which changed owners in 2010 and has been fully restored in anticipation of trade from the cycle trail.

Another staging point for the cycle trail is Cowboy Paradise inland from Lake Kaniere. Initially built for corporate functions and adventure events like pistol shooting, their market is changing quickly towards cycle tourism. The owner, beef farmer Mike Milne, said in 2015:

I think this beast, this cycle way, is exceeding anybody's expectations of what it possibly could have done. Which is a good thing for the community and a good thing for the businesses along the way.

The official opening of the cycle trail coincided with other events that put international attention to the West Coast. First, Eleanor Catton's book The Luminaries, which is set on the West Coast during the time of the gold rush, won the 2013 Man Booker Prize. Then, Lonely Planet included the West Coast as one of the world's top 10 regions for tourists to visit in the following year. When the trail was opened soon after, international media picked up on this and included the West Coast Wilderness Trail in its reporting.
