= Hokitika Gorge =

Gorge in New Zealand

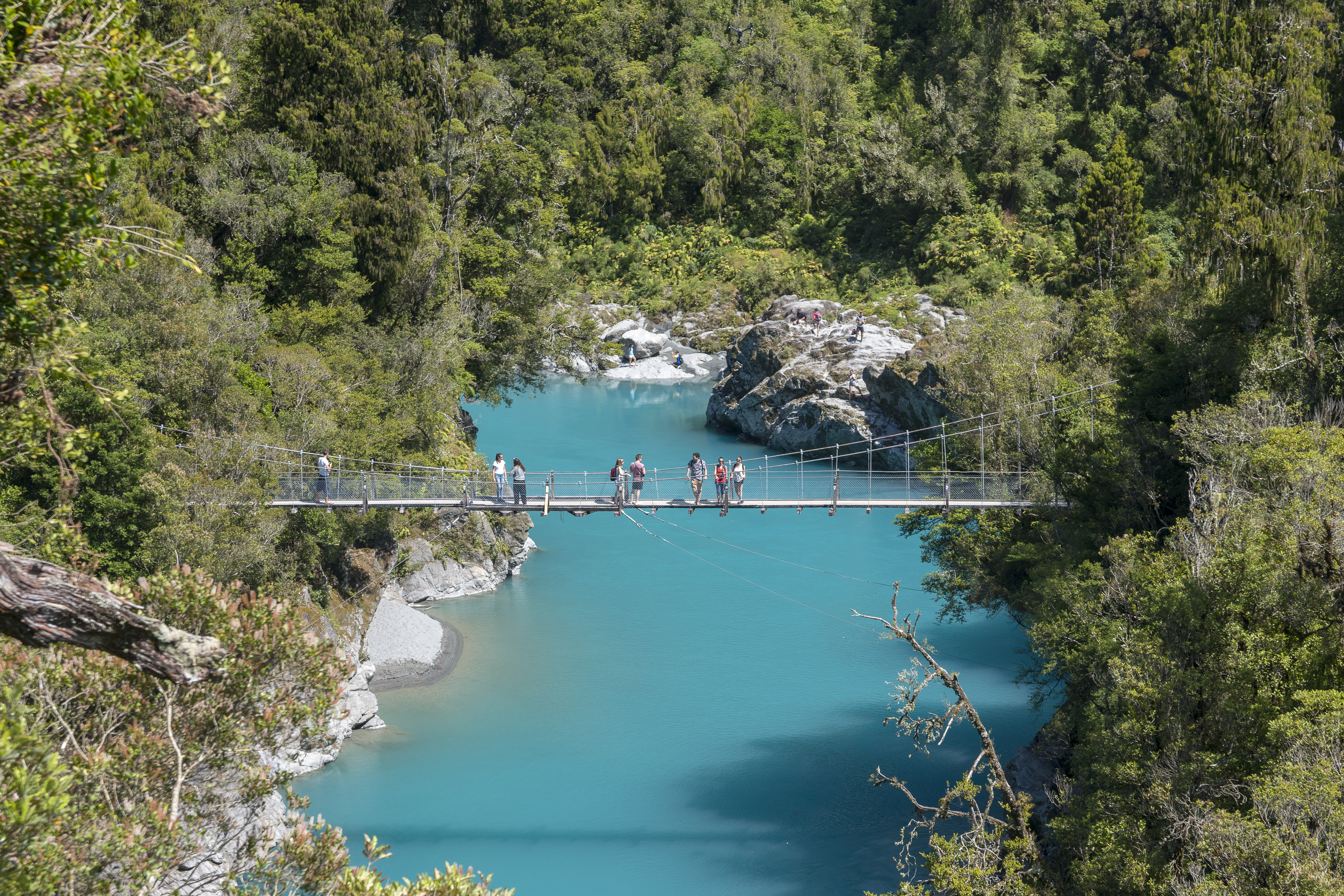
- View of the lower bridge over Hokitika Gorge

Geography
- Country: New Zealand
- State/Province: West Coast
- District: Westland District
- Coordinates: 42°57′14″S 171°00′58″E
- River: Hokitika River
- Interactive map of Hokitika Gorge

Hokitika Gorge and the surrounding Hokitika Gorge Scenic Reserve are a major tourist destination some 33 kilometres (21 mi) or 40 minutes drive inland from Hokitika, New Zealand. Since August 2020, a second suspension bridge over the Hokitika River at the gorge provides the opportunity for a round track.

== Location ==
The Hokitika Gorge was ground out of granite by the Hokitika River. The gorge is a 40-minute drive of 33 kilometres (21 mi) inland from Hokitika, located in the South Island's West Coast.

== History ==
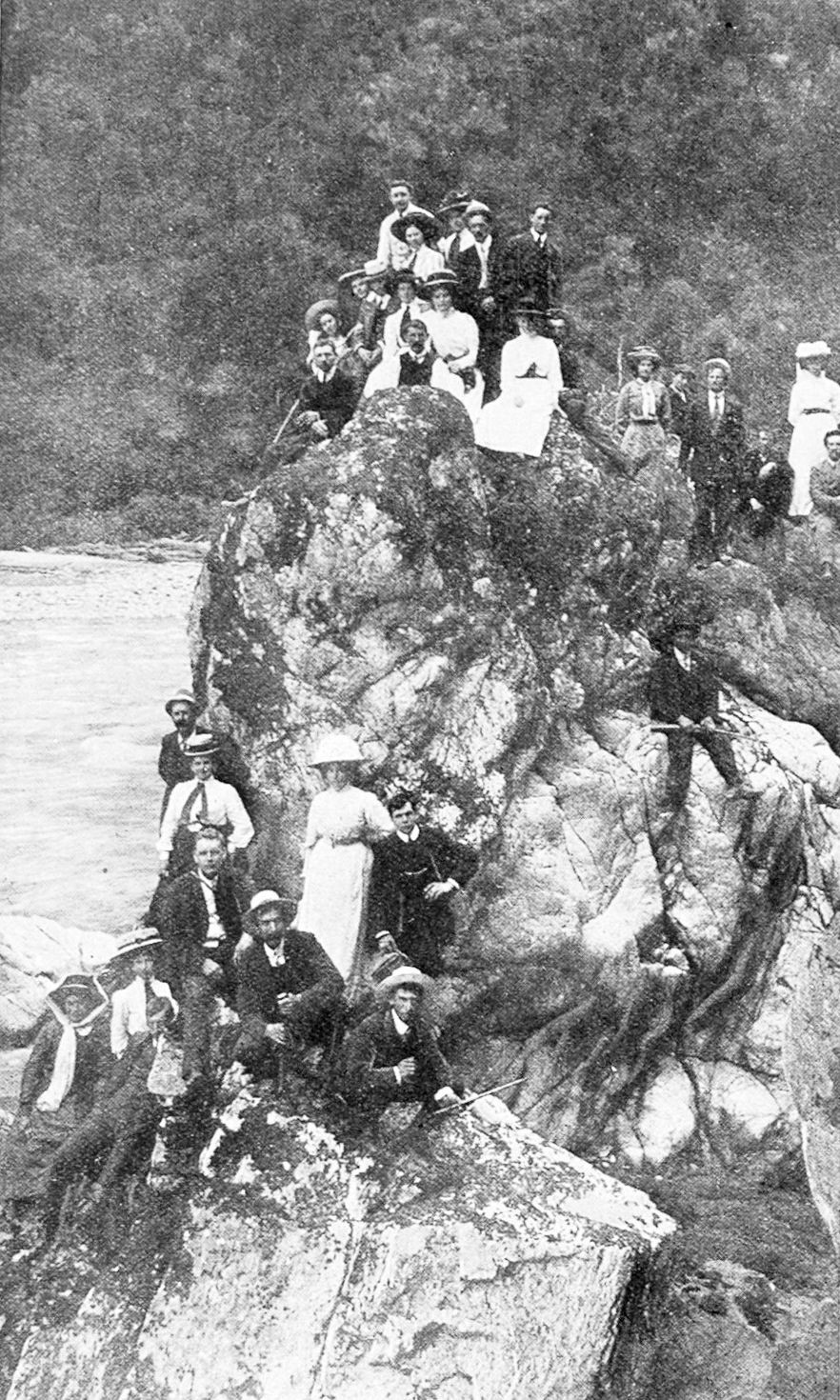
Picnic party at the Hokitika Gorge in 1910

Māori people crossed the Southern Alps from the headwaters of the Rakaia River via Rurumataikau (later named Whitcombe Pass after Henry Whitcombe) and reached the West Coast via Hokitika Gorge. Whitcombe and Joseph Lauper made this crossing in 1863 (Whitcombe would soon after drown on the same journey in the Taramakau River) searching for a suitable road link between Canterbury and the West Coast to profit from the West Coast gold rush (the route was far too challenging and soon after, Arthur's Pass was chosen instead). In 1865, Julius von Haast explored the Hokitika River by canoe but did not get beyond Hokitika Gorge as the river was too swift. Gerhard Mueller, the chief surveyor for Westland, revived the discussion about a road over Whitcombe Pass in 1880 but nothing came of this.

The earliest recorded gold mining in the gorge was in 1887. In 1898, 50 possums were released to establish a fur trade. In 1900, the Westland Acclimatisation Society was given four moose calves imported from Canada and these were released at the gorge. The last moose was sighted in 1914 and it is believed that they never bred.

In 1906, the Westland Acclimatisation Society applied for government support for tourism opportunities. The government responded by building a road to Hokitika Gorge. In March 1914, William Massey was the first prime minister to visit the gorge and he was most impressed by the scenic beauty. The first commercial tours from Hokitika to the gorge were available from 1922.

In 1953, 106 hectares (260 acres) were gazetted by the government as a scenic reserve known as Hokitika Gorge Scenic Reserve. In 2004, Air Walkways Ltd applied for a consent for a canopy walkway at Hokitika Gorge. There was strong public opposition to the proposal and the Department of Conservation turned down the application in May 2006. Some years later, the West Coast Treetop Walk at Lake Mahinapua was instead built by Australian eco-tourism company 'Canopy01'.

=== Bridges ===
In 1924, the Minister of Public Works, Gordon Coates, promised funding for a footbridge over the gorge. But it was not until 1930 that serious moves were made to build a bridge. A simple suspension bridge suitable to get people and livestock across the river opened in October 1933, jointly funded by the government (NZ£100) and Westland County Council (NZ£250). This bridge still exists and is now the lower (downstream) bridge.

On 16 August 2020, the Department of Conservation opened a second suspension bridge. At 90 metres (300 ft), it is one of New Zealand's longest suspension bridges. It crosses the river upstream from the 1933 bridge where an island is located in the river; the bridge leads through the treetops on the island. At the same time, a new track opened that turned the previous one-way track into a loop track through Hokitika Gorge Scenic Reserve.

== Tourism ==
Some 40,000 people visit the Hokitika Gorge per year, making it the third-most popular tourist attraction in the Hokitika area according to Tripadvisor.

== Gallery ==
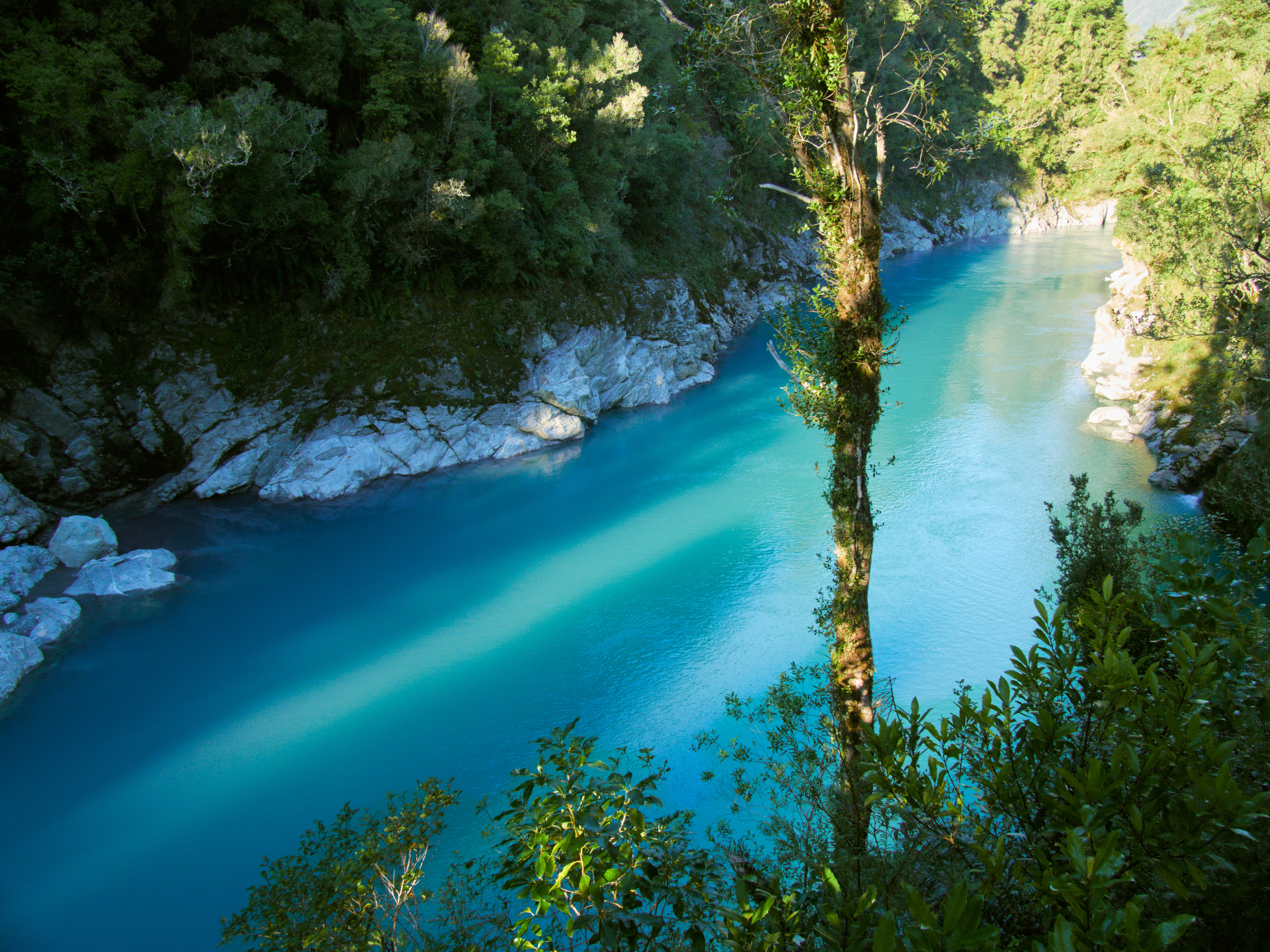
Hokitika Gorge, with the distinctive water colour from glacial flour

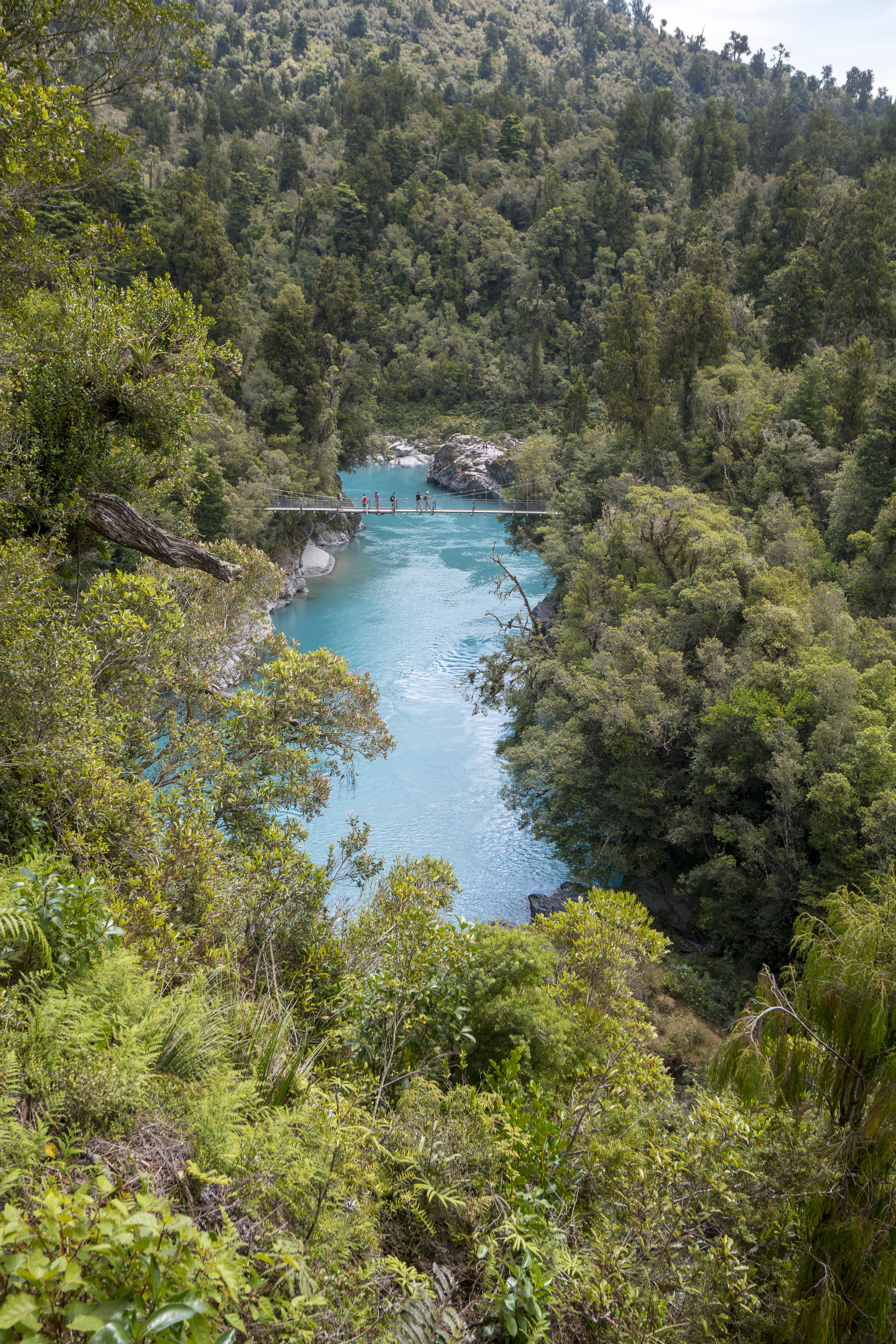
Hokitika Gorge, panoramic view

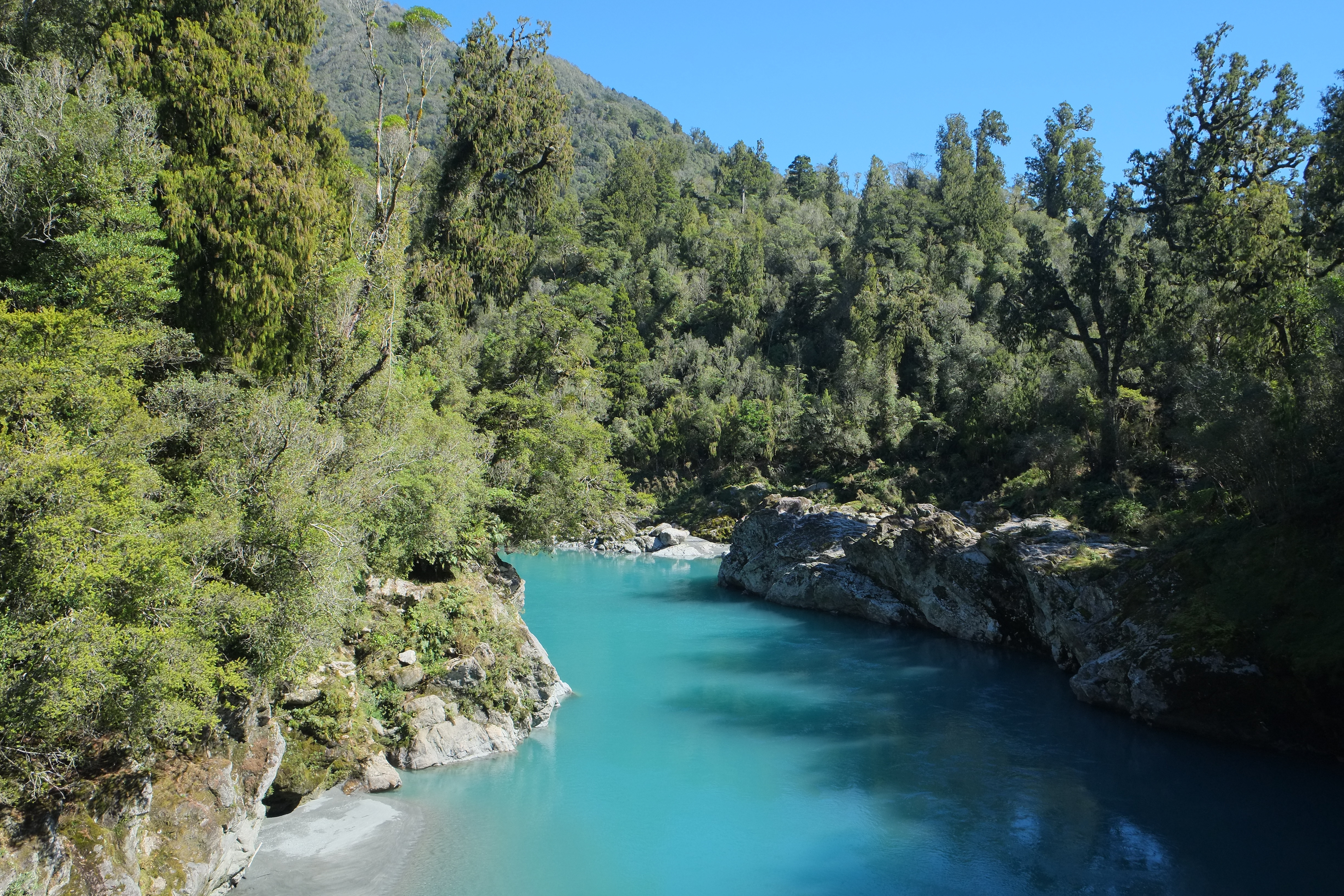
Hokitika River and Hokitika Gorge upstream from swingbridge
