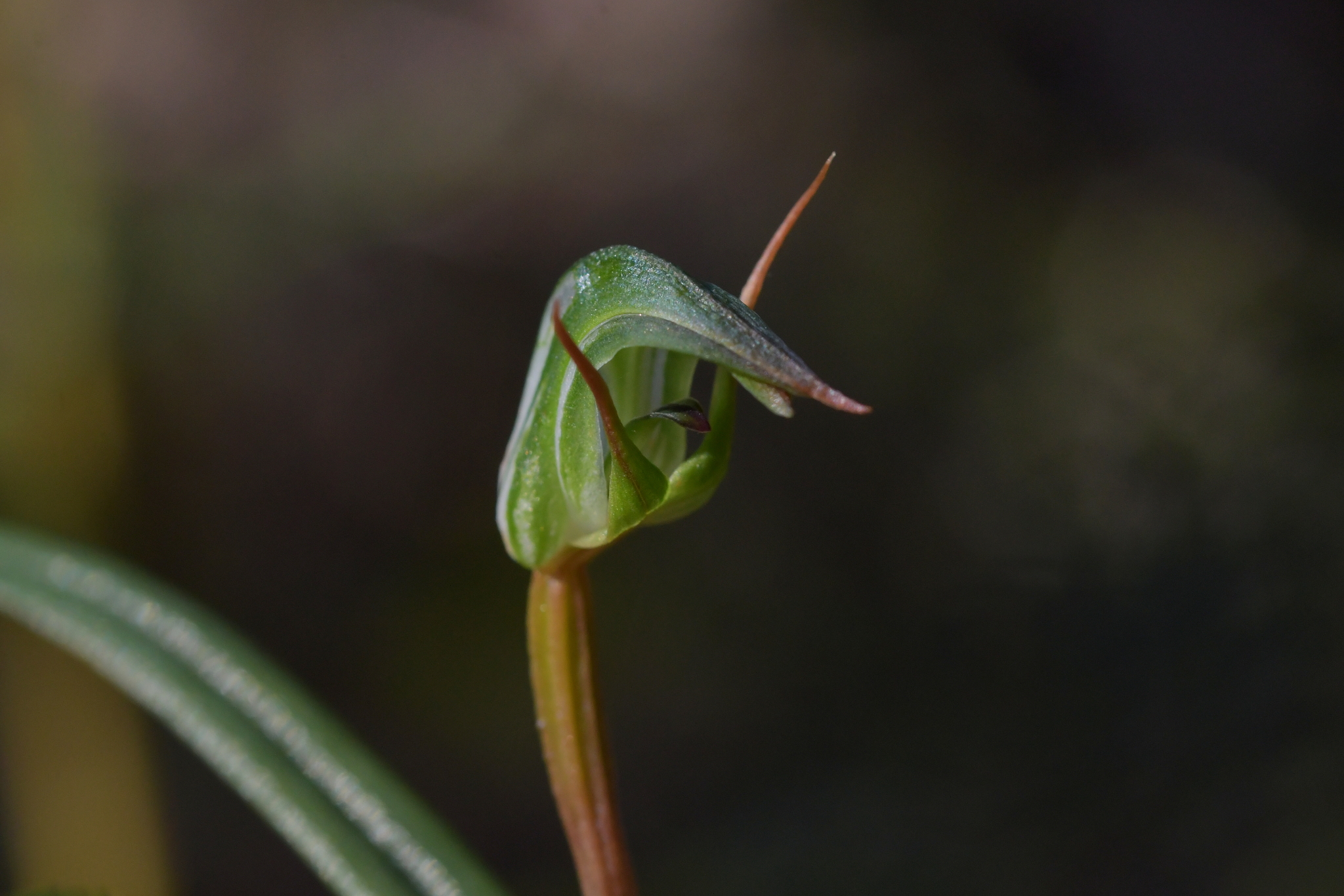

Conservation status
- Naturally Uncommon (NZ TCS)

Scientific classification
- Kingdom: Plantae
- Clade: Tracheophytes
- Clade: Angiosperms
- Clade: Monocots
- Order: Asparagales
- Family: Orchidaceae
- Subfamily: Orchidoideae
- Tribe: Cranichideae
- Genus: Pterostylis
- Species: P. cernua

Binomial name
- Pterostylis cernua D.L.Jones, Molloy & M.A.Clem.

= Pterostylis cernua =

Westland greenhood

Species of plant

Pterostylis cernua, commonly known as the Westland greenhood, is a species of orchid endemic to New Zealand. Non-flowering plants have a rosette of leaves but flowering plants have a single white, dark green and reddish-brown flower with leaves on the flowering stem.

== Description ==
Pterostylis cernua is a terrestrial, perennial, deciduous, herb with an underground tuber. Non-flowering plants have a rosette of between three and five elliptic to lance-shaped leaves which are 15–35 mm (0.6–1 in) long and 4–7 mm (0.2–0.3 in) wide. Flowering plants have a single green flower with translucent white lines and a reddish-brown tinge on the tips. The flower leans forward slightly and is borne on a stem 60–120 mm (2–5 in) tall. The dorsal sepal and petals are fused, forming a hood or "galea" over the column. The dorsal sepal is 25–28 mm (0.98–1.1 in) long and 11–13 mm (0.4–0.5 in) wide and curves forward with a short-pointed tip. The lateral sepals are erect, loosely in contact with the galea and taper to thread-like tips 13–15 mm (0.5–0.6 in) long. The labellum is curved, dark green with a blackish callus along its centre line. Flowering occurs from November to January.

== Taxonomy and naming ==
Pterostylis cernua was first formally described in 1997 by David Jones, Brian Molloy and Mark Clements and the description was published in The Orchadian. The specific epithet (cernua) is a Latin word meaning "drooping", "stooping", "facing earthward" or "nodding".

== Distribution and habitat ==
The Westland greenhood grows in grass and sphagnum moss in swampy ground and in seasonally flooded areas. It is only known from the west coast of the South Island near Hokitika, Kumara and Lake Mahinapua.

== Conservation status ==
Under the New Zealand Threat Classification System, this species is listed as "Naturally Uncommon" with the qualifier of "Biologically Sparse".
