= Kumara, New Zealand =

Town in West Coast, New Zealand

Kumara
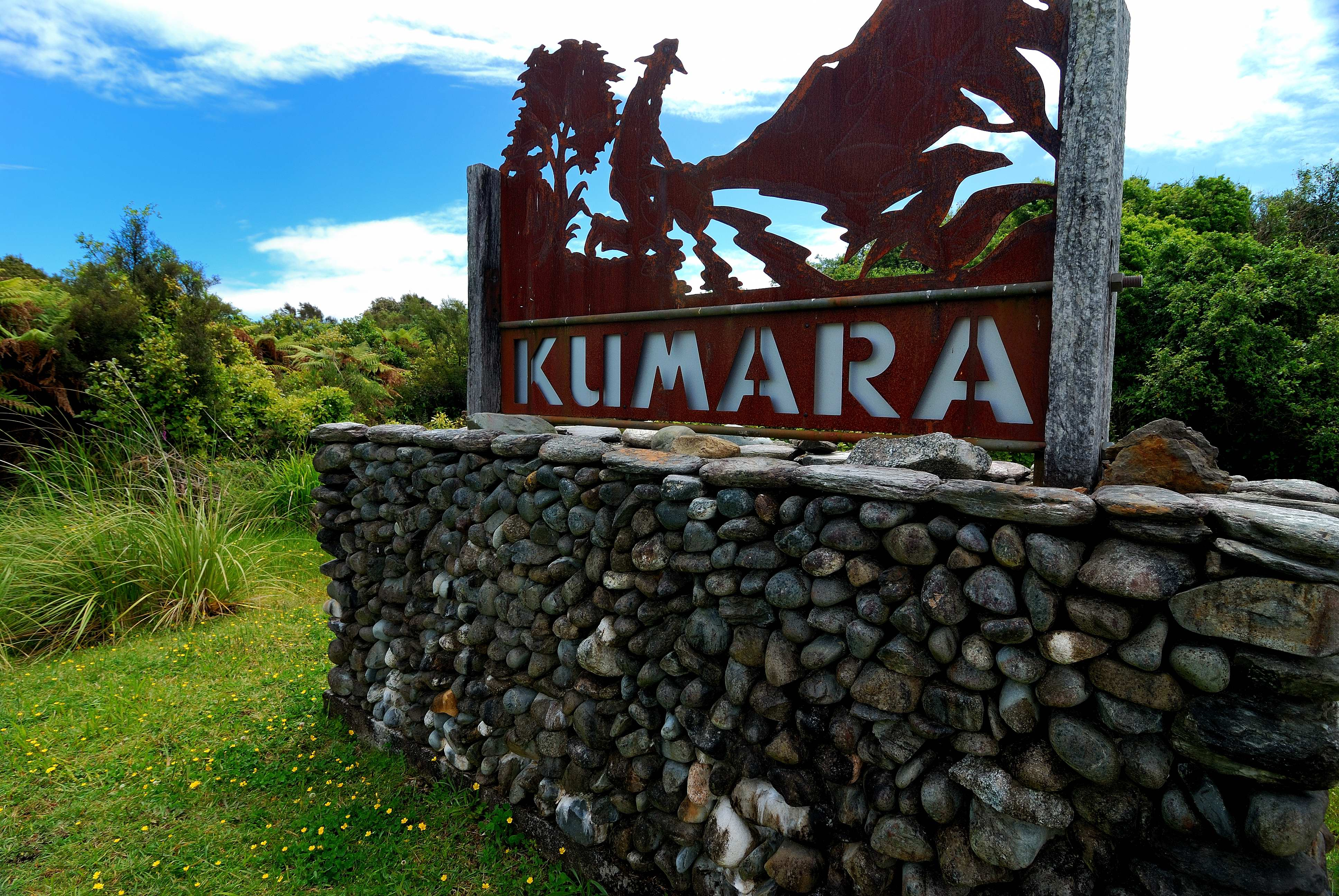
- Sign beside SH 73 on the outskirts of Kumara
- Interactive map of Kumara
- Coordinates: 42°37′52″S 171°11′13″E
- Country: New Zealand
- Region: West Coast
- District: Westland District
- Ward: Northern
- Electorates: West Coast-Tasman; Te Tai Tonga

Government
  - Territorial authority: Westland District Council
  - Regional council: West Coast Regional Council
  - Mayor of Westland: Helen Lash
  - West Coast-Tasman MP: Katie Milne
  - Te Tai Tonga MP: Mananui Ramsden

Area
  - Total: 2.69 km^{2} (1.04 sq mi)

Population (June 2025)
  - Total: 320
  - Density: 120/km^{2} (310/sq mi)
- Time zone: UTC+12 (NZST)
  - Summer (DST): UTC+13 (NZDT)
- Postcode: 7832
- Area code: 03
- Local iwi: Ngāi Tahu

Kumara is a town on the West Coast of the South Island of New Zealand. It is located 30 kilometres (19 mi) south of Greymouth, close to the western end of State Highway 73, which leads across Arthur's Pass to Christchurch. The Taramakau River flows past to the north.

The name may come from the Māori language Kohe mara, which is the blossom of the tātarāmoa, or bush lawyer.

The Coast to Coast annual multisport race starts at Kumara Beach.

== History ==
Kumara was founded and became one of the country's chief gold mining centres following the discovery of gold at Dillmanstown, about 3 kilometres (2 mi) to the south-east, in 1876. The tramline from Greymouth to Paroa was extended to Kumara the following year. The population was 4,220 in October 1877. The town became a borough in 1877. Kumara Hospital was operating by 1881 and continued into the twentieth century. In 1882, the Kumara volunteer fire brigade was formed.

Kumara was the home town of prominent politician Richard Seddon, who was elected mayor of the town in 1877, and served as Prime Minister of New Zealand from 1893 until his death in 1906.

In 1925, the manager of Pearns Hotel in Kumara was charged by police after she refused to supply accommodation to two visiting temperance lecturers. The Pearn's Brewery became part of Westland Ales around this time.

Although the town once had 50 pubs, the numbers dwindled. In June 2009, the last remaining pub, the Empire Hotel, had its licence cancelled by the Liquor Licensing Authority. In 2010, the last store of the town faced closure, with only a few hundred inhabitants left, but it was hoped that one of the New Zealand Cycle Trails to run through the town would lift the settlement's fortunes again. In November 2012 the Theatre Royal Hotel reopened as the only pub serving Kumara, and in November 2013 the West Coast Wilderness Trail cycleway running from Greymouth to Ross was officially opened with a ceremony in Kumara.

== Demographics ==
Kūmara is described by Stats NZ as a rural settlement and covers 2.69 km^{2} (1.04 sq mi). It had an estimated population of 320 as of June 2025, with a population density of 119 people per km^{2}. The settlement is part of the larger Arahura-Kumara statistical area.

Historical population for Kūmara
Year	Pop.	±% p.a.
2006	315	—
2013	309	−0.27%
2018	285	−1.60%
2023	309	+1.63%

Kūmara had a population of 309 in the 2023 New Zealand census, an increase of 24 people (8.4%) since the 2018 census, and unchanged since the 2013 census. There were 162 males and 147 females in 150 dwellings. 1.9% of people identified as LGBTIQ+. The median age was 53.2 years (compared with 38.1 years nationally). There were 42 people (13.6%) aged under 15 years, 30 (9.7%) aged 15 to 29, 156 (50.5%) aged 30 to 64, and 84 (27.2%) aged 65 or older.

People could identify as more than one ethnicity. The results were 92.2% European (Pākehā), 13.6% Māori, 2.9% Pasifika, 1.0% Asian, and 7.8% other, which includes people giving their ethnicity as "New Zealander". English was spoken by 100.0%, Māori by 1.9%, and other languages by 4.9%. New Zealand Sign Language was known by 1.0%. The percentage of people born overseas was 12.6, compared with 28.8% nationally.

Religious affiliations were 28.2% Christian, 1.0% Māori religious beliefs, and 1.0% New Age. People who answered that they had no religion were 56.3%, and 13.6% of people did not answer the census question.

Of those at least 15 years old, 30 (11.2%) people had a bachelor's or higher degree, 162 (60.7%) had a post-high school certificate or diploma, and 72 (27.0%) people exclusively held high school qualifications. The median income was $29,900, compared with $41,500 nationally. 15 people (5.6%) earned over $100,000 compared to 12.1% nationally. The employment status of those at least 15 was 117 (43.8%) full-time, 33 (12.4%) part-time, and 6 (2.2%) unemployed.

=== Arahura-Kūmara statistical area ===
Arahura-Kūmara covers 264.41 km^{2} (102.09 sq mi) and had an estimated population of 1,580 as of June 2025, with a population density of 6.0 people per km^{2}.

Historical population for Arahura-Kūmara
Year	Pop.	±% p.a.
2006	954	—
2013	1,227	+3.66%
2018	1,281	+0.87%
2023	1,497	+3.17%
The 2006 population is for a smaller area of 262.27 km^{2}. Source:

Arahura-Kūmara had a population of 1,497 in the 2023 New Zealand census, an increase of 216 people (16.9%) since the 2018 census, and an increase of 270 people (22.0%) since the 2013 census. There were 792 males, 699 females, and 6 people of other genders in 639 dwellings. 2.2% of people identified as LGBTIQ+. The median age was 51.8 years (compared with 38.1 years nationally). There were 228 people (15.2%) aged under 15 years, 153 (10.2%) aged 15 to 29, 819 (54.7%) aged 30 to 64, and 300 (20.0%) aged 65 or older.

People could identify as more than one ethnicity. The results were 89.8% European (Pākehā); 16.2% Māori; 2.0% Pasifika; 2.4% Asian; 0.6% Middle Eastern, Latin American and African New Zealanders (MELAA); and 6.4% other, which includes people giving their ethnicity as "New Zealander". English was spoken by 98.0%, Māori by 3.0%, and other languages by 5.4%. No language could be spoken by 1.8% (e.g. too young to talk). New Zealand Sign Language was known by 0.4%. The percentage of people born overseas was 13.8, compared with 28.8% nationally.

Religious affiliations were 29.5% Christian, 0.4% Hindu, 0.4% Māori religious beliefs, 1.0% New Age, and 1.0% other religions. People who answered that they had no religion were 58.3%, and 9.2% of people did not answer the census question.

Of those at least 15 years old, 198 (15.6%) people had a bachelor's or higher degree, 723 (57.0%) had a post-high school certificate or diploma, and 348 (27.4%) people exclusively held high school qualifications. The median income was $38,700, compared with $41,500 nationally. 114 people (9.0%) earned over $100,000 compared to 12.1% nationally. The employment status of those at least 15 was 618 (48.7%) full-time, 192 (15.1%) part-time, and 21 (1.7%) unemployed.

== Former swimming pool ==
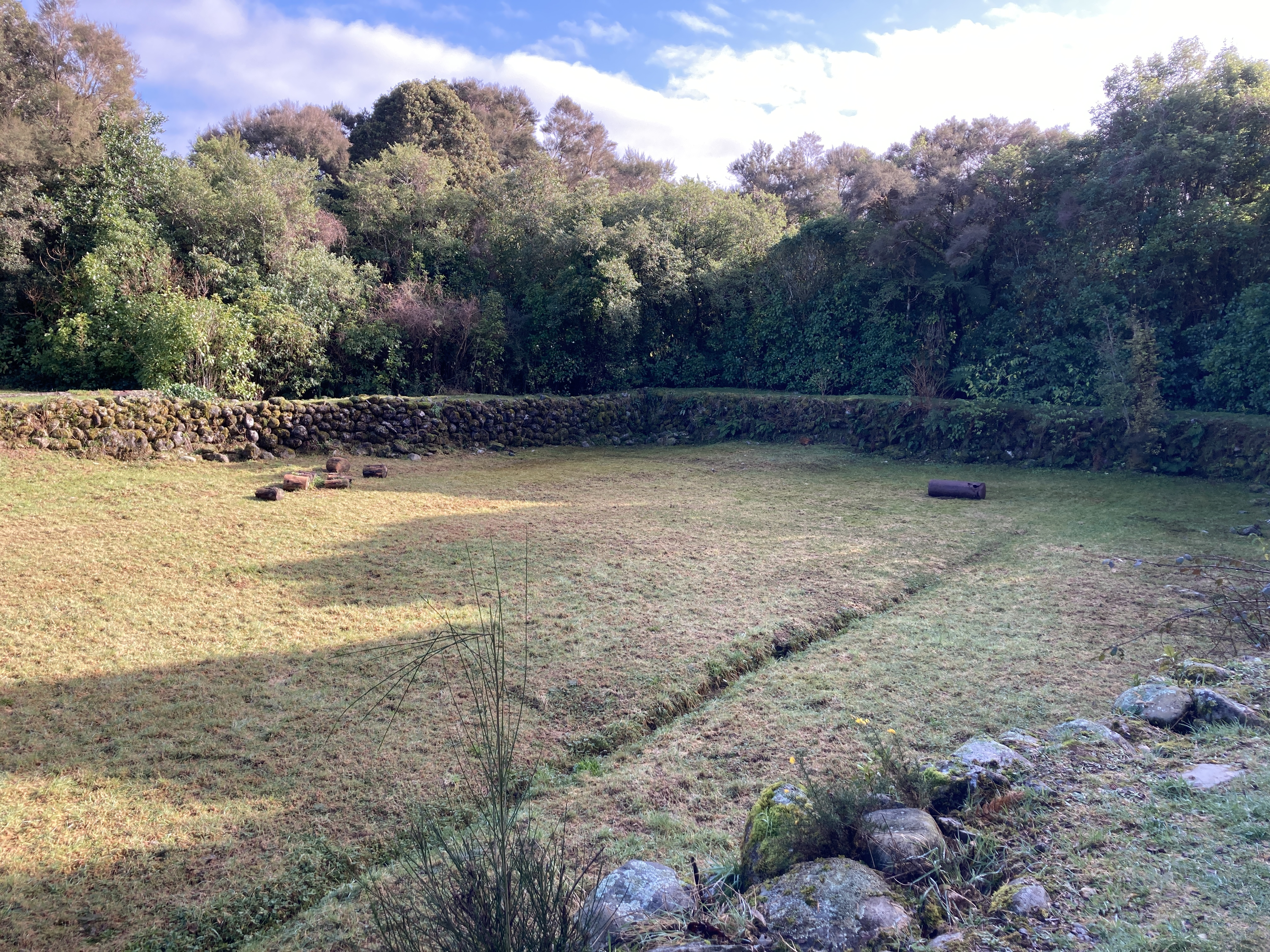
Kumara Swimming Pool (former)

In 1934, a community swimming pool was constructed using voluntary labour. The pool was built during the 1930s depression when mining activity and the population of the area had both declined. It was 50 yards (46 m) long and 33 yards (30 m) wide, with a depth of 6.5 feet (2.0 m) at the deep end. The pool was built in the unique surroundings of debris left behind from old gold diggings, with the walls made from boulders from the diggings. Water for the pool was conveyed 3 kilometres (1.9 mi) from the Dillmanstown Kapitea Reservoir using old iron pipes recovered from historic sluicing schemes. The pool was originally part of a sports complex for the township including a basketball court and a cricket pitch. The pool is no longer in use but the area has been registered with Heritage New Zealand as a Category 2 listed place.

== Notable buildings ==
Notable buildings

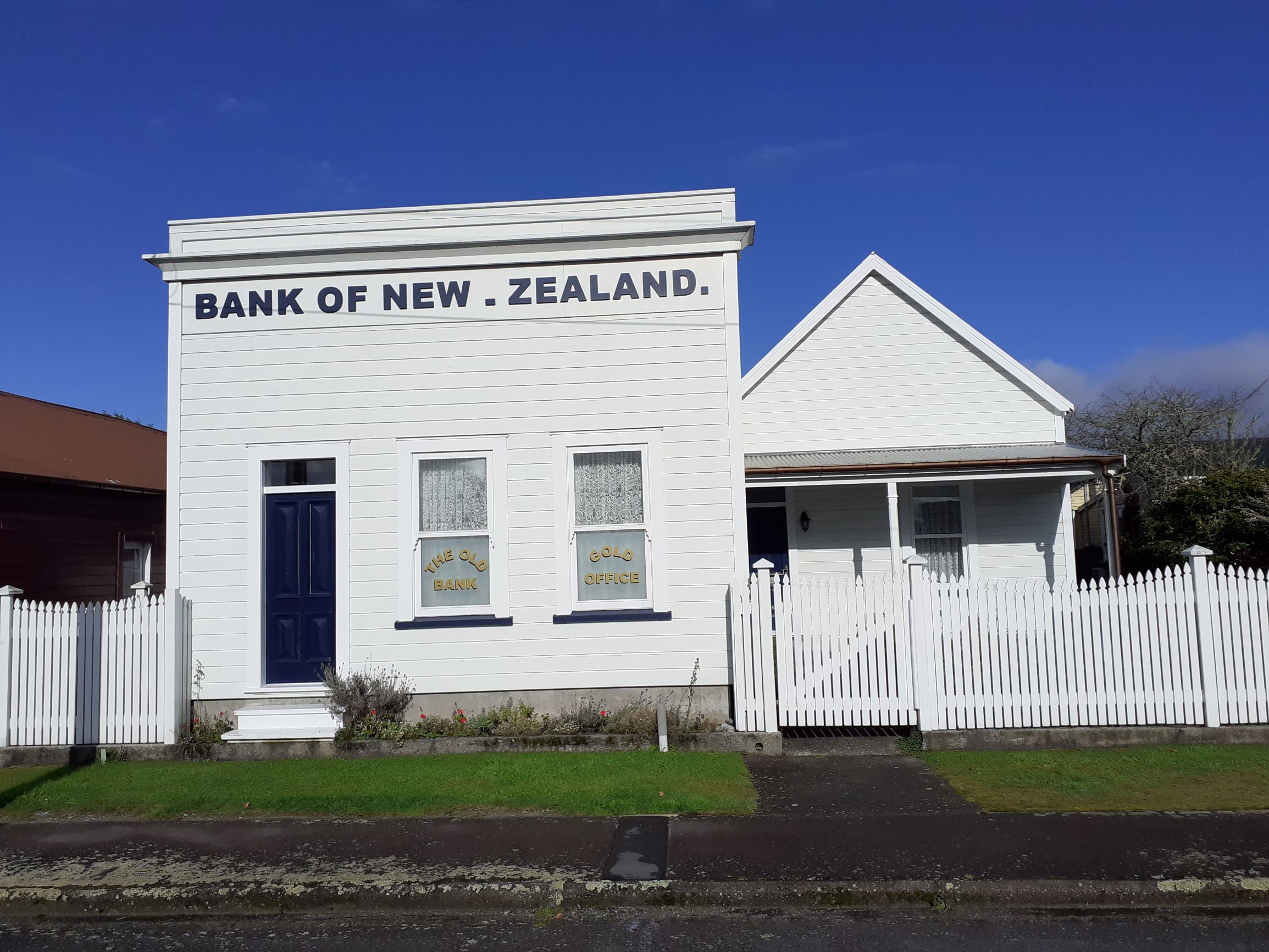
Bank of New Zealand, Kumara (2021)

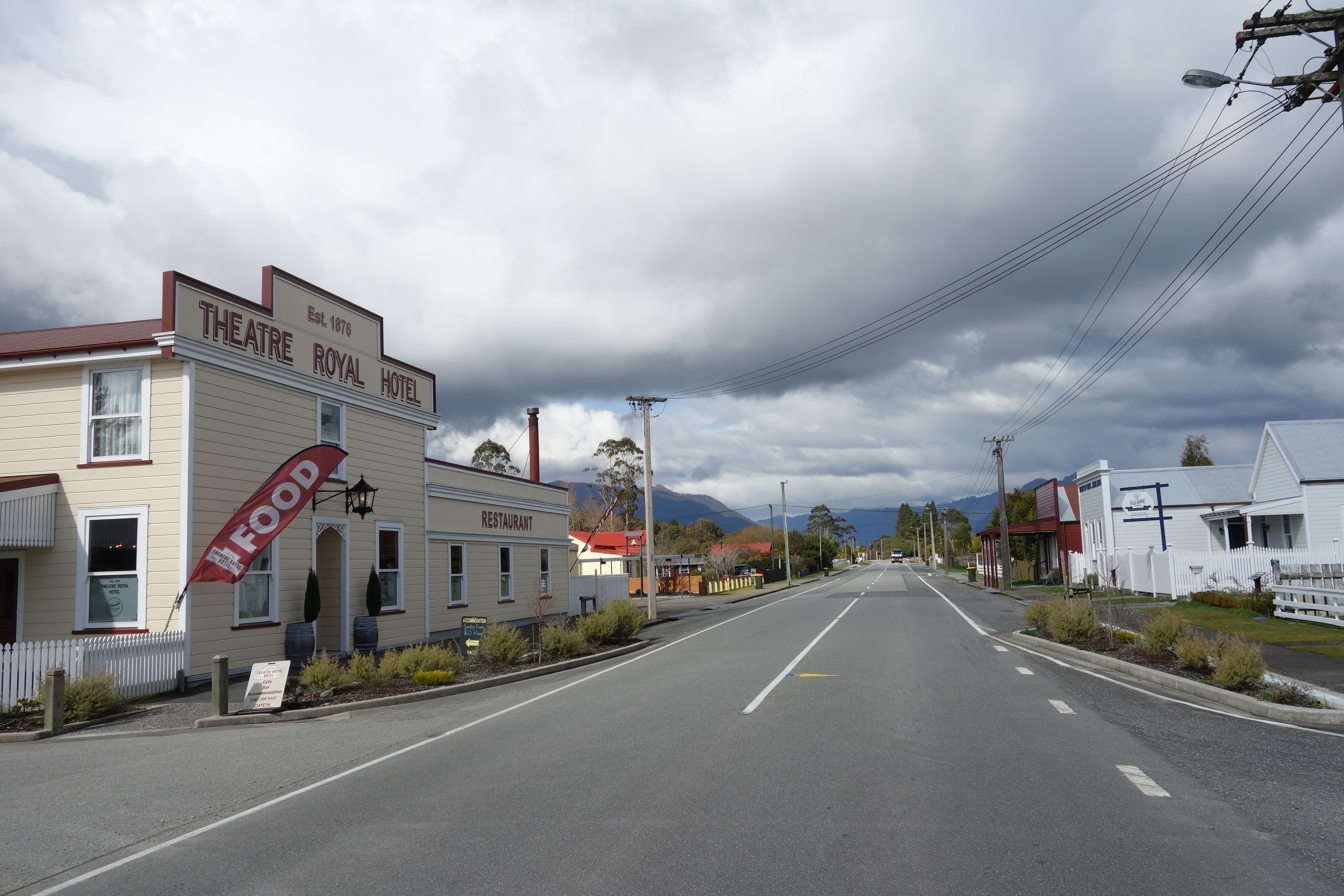
Theatre Royal Hotel

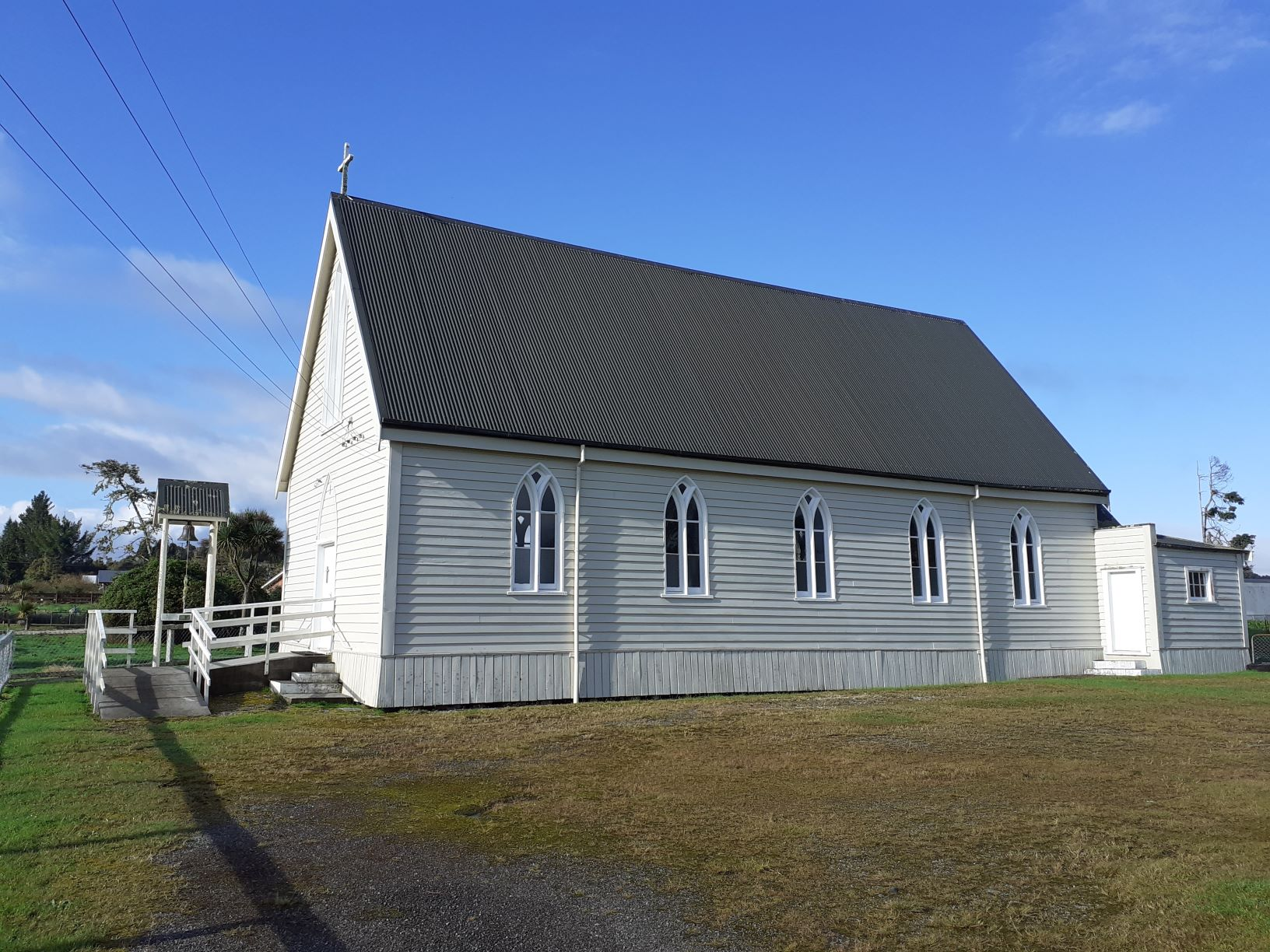
St Patrick's Catholic Church, Kumara (2021)

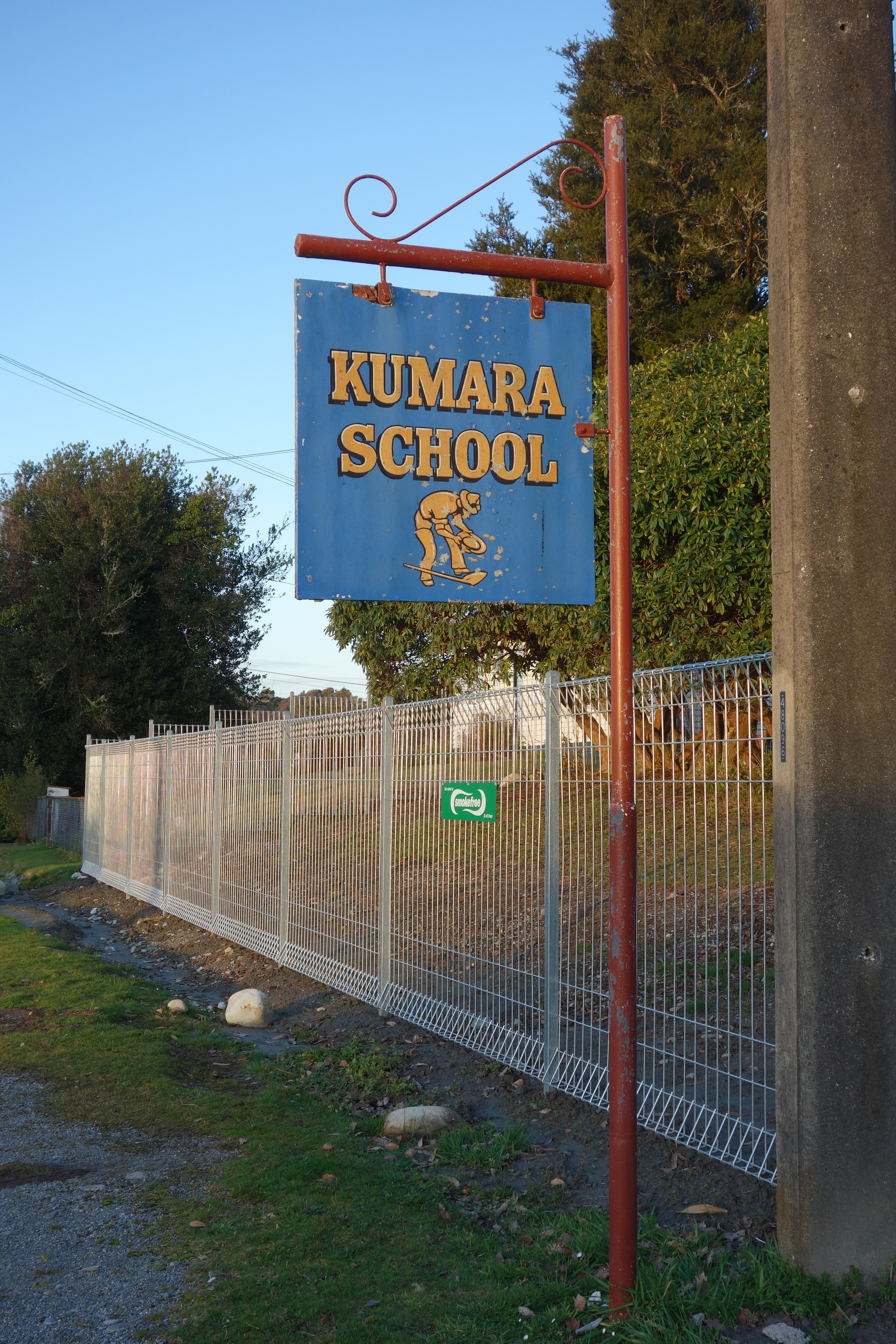
Kumara School

=== Bank of New Zealand ===
The Bank of New Zealand was first established in Kumara in 1876.

=== St Patrick's Catholic Church ===
St Patrick's was built by the parishioners in 1877.

== Education ==
Kūmara School is a coeducational full primary school (years 1–8), with a roll of 47 as of July 2026. It opened in 1877.

The Sisters of Mercy ran the previous parish school as St Patricks School in Kumara from 1889. It closed in 1970.
