= Totara River =

Totara River may refer to

- Totara River (Buller District)
- Totara River (Westland District)
