= Treetop Walk =

Treetop Walk or Tree Top Walk may refer to:

- Canopy walkway, a structure allowing pedestrian access to a forest canopy
- Tree Top Walk at the Walpole-Nornalup National Park, Western Australia
- HSBC TreeTop Walk at the Central Catchment Nature Reserve, Singapore
- Tahune Airwalk, Huon Valley, Tasmania
- Treetop walkway at Royal Botanic Gardens, Kew, England
- West Coast Treetop Walk near Hokitika, New Zealand
