= Little Totara River =

Coordinates: 41°52′S 171°28′E

Location
- Country: New Zealand

Physical characteristics
- Source
  - location: Paparoa Range
- Mouth
  - location: Tasman Sea
- Length: 17 km (11 mi)

The Little Totara River is a river in the northwest of New Zealand's South Island. It rises on the northern slopes of Mount Euclid in the Paparoa Range, flowing northwest to its confluence with the Tōtara River at the latter's mouth on the Tasman Sea seven kilometres north of Charleston.

It was designated as a nationally protected area in 1987 by the Department of Conservation.

== See also ==
- List of rivers of New Zealand
