= Ruatapu, New Zealand =

Town in West Coast Region, New Zealand

Ruatapu
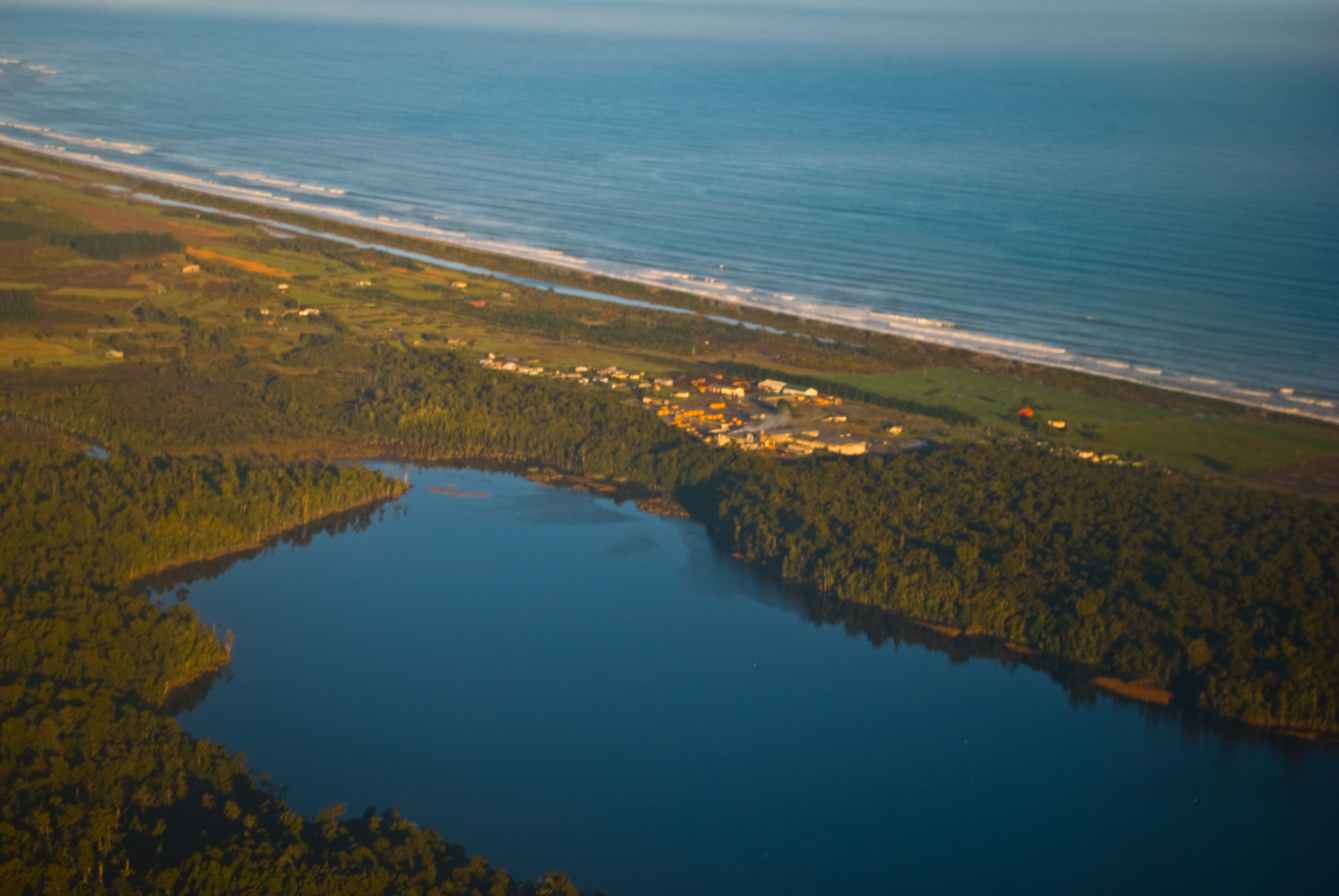
- Ruatapu, with Lake Mahinapua shown in the foreground, and the Tasman Sea in the background.
- Interactive map of Ruatapu
- Coordinates: 42°48′21″S 170°53′20″E
- Country: New Zealand
- Region: West Coast
- District: Westland District
- Electorates: West Coast-Tasman; Te Tai Tonga

Area
  - Total: 15.53 km^{2} (6.00 sq mi)

Population (2023 census)
  - Total: 84
  - Density: 5.4/km^{2} (14/sq mi)
- Time zone: UTC+12 (NZST)
  - Summer (DST): UTC+13 (NZDT)
- Postcode: 7883
- Area code: 03
- Local iwi: Ngāi Tahu

Ruatapu is a small town in the Westland District in the West Coast region of the South Island of New Zealand. The town's name stems from Ruatapu, a figure in Māori mythology. The town is located on a narrow strip of land between the Tasman Sea and Lake Mahinapua, a shallow lake that was originally a coastal lagoon. State Highway 6 runs through Ruatapu, connecting it to the nearby towns of Hokitika and Ross. The town's economy is based upon agriculture, as well as a large sawmill, operated by Westco Lagan, which mills radiata pine for further processing in Christchurch.

== History ==
=== Railway ===
On 9 November 1906, the Midland railway line, running from Greymouth to Hokitika, extended a branch line to Ruatapu. Ruatapu acted as the terminus of the railway until 1 April 1909, when it was opened to Ross, and became known as the Ross Branch. Passenger services ceased on 9 October 1972 and the line closed to all traffic on 24 November 1980. Some of the track bed near Ruatapu can now be driven.

=== Sawmill and tramway ===
Joseph Butler bought 28,000 acres (11,000 ha) of rimu, mataī, and kahikatea bush, between Ruatapu and Ross, for £28,000 in 1907. With his brother William, he formed Butler Brothers Ltd, with the Kauri Timber Co as a major shareholder. A large steam-powered sawmill worked from 1911. A large storm in October 1915 ripped the roof off the sawmill, demolished a hut, and shifted another house from its foundations. An electric-powered mill was built in 1955 after the original had burnt down in 1952 and was rebuilt again after another fire in the early 1980s.

Fletcher Holdings took over the mill in 1961, sold it to Henderson & Pollard Ltd in 1979 and they became part of Carter Holt Harvey in 1987. In 1988 the mill was sold to Westco Lagan Ltd.

Tramways ran up to 20 km (12 mi) south from the mill until replaced by logging trucks in 1960.

== Demographics ==
Ruatapu locality covers 15.53 km^{2} (6.00 sq mi). It is part of the larger Hokitaka Rural statistical area.

Historical population
Year	Pop.	±% p.a.
2006	117	—
2013	75	−6.16%
2018	72	−0.81%
2023	84	+3.13%

Ruatapu had a population of 84 in the 2023 New Zealand census, an increase of 12 people (16.7%) since the 2018 census, and an increase of 9 people (12.0%) since the 2013 census. There were 42 males and 42 females in 54 dwellings. 3.6% of people identified as LGBTIQ+. The median age was 41.8 years (compared with 38.1 years nationally). There were 18 people (21.4%) aged under 15 years, 12 (14.3%) aged 15 to 29, 39 (46.4%) aged 30 to 64, and 12 (14.3%) aged 65 or older.

People could identify as more than one ethnicity. The results were 75.0% European (Pākehā), 35.7% Māori, 3.6% Pasifika, 7.1% Asian, and 7.1% other, which includes people giving their ethnicity as "New Zealander". English was spoken by 92.9%, Māori by 7.1%, and other languages by 7.1%. No language could be spoken by 7.1% (e.g. too young to talk). The percentage of people born overseas was 10.7, compared with 28.8% nationally.

Religious affiliations were 28.6% Christian and 3.6% New Age. People who answered that they had no religion were 64.3%, and 3.6% of people did not answer the census question.

Of those at least 15 years old, 6 (9.1%) people had a bachelor's or higher degree, 33 (50.0%) had a post-high school certificate or diploma, and 27 (40.9%) people exclusively held high school qualifications. The median income was $33,600, compared with $41,500 nationally. 3 people (4.5%) earned over $100,000 compared to 12.1% nationally. The employment status of those at least 15 was 30 (45.5%) full-time and 9 (13.6%) part-time.

== Education ==
Ruatapu Primary School opened in 1907 and closed about 1969.
