= Westland District Council =

Coordinates: 42.71815°S 170.9619371°E

Type
- Type: Unicameral of Westland District
- Houses: Governing Body
- Term limits: None

History
- Founded: 6 March 1989

Leadership
- Mayor: Helen Lash

Structure
- Seats: 9 (1 mayor, 8 ward seats)
- Length of term: 3 years

Website
- westlanddc.govt.nz

Westland District Council is the territorial authority for the Westland District of New Zealand.

The council is led by the mayor of Westland, who is currently Helen Lash. There are also eight ward councillors.

== Composition ==
=== Councillors ===
- Mayor Helen Lash
- Northern Ward: Reilly Burben, Euan Mackenzie and Greg Maitland
- Hokitika Ward: Steven Gillett, Carol Martin and Joseph Walker
- Southern Ward: Brian Manera and Janella Munns

== History ==
The council was formed in 1989. Its predecessors include Hokitika County Council (1868–1989), Ross County Council (1878–1972), and Westland County Council (1876–1989).

In 2020, the council had 205 staff, including 22 earning more than $100,000. According to the right-wing Taxpayers' Union think tank, residential rates averaged $2,601.
