= Tōtara River (Westland District) =

River in Westland District, New Zealand

Coordinates: 42°52′33″S 170°48′25″E

Location
- Country: New Zealand

Physical characteristics
- Source
  - location: Bald Hill Range
  - elevation: 840 metres (2,760 ft)
- Mouth
  - location: Tasman Sea
  - elevation: 0 m (0 ft)
- Length: 17 km (11 mi)

The Tōtara River is a river of the southern West Coast of New Zealand's South Island. Rising on the slopes of Bald Hill the river flows north then west to reach the Tasman Sea two kilometres north of Ross.
