= Tōtara River (Buller District) =

River in Buller District, New Zealand

Coordinates: 41°51′30″S 171°28′0″E

Location
- Country: New Zealand

Physical characteristics
- Source
  - location: Paparoa Range
  - elevation: 975 metres (3,199 ft)
- Mouth
  - location: Tasman Sea
  - elevation: 0 m (0 ft)
- Length: 18 km (11 mi)

The Tōtara River is a river of the northern West Coast Region of New Zealand's South Island. It rises near Mount Kelvin in the Paparoa Range and flows northwest to reach the Tasman Sea 10 kilometres south of Cape Foulwind. The Little Totara River joins the Tōtara just before it reaches the sea.
