= Ross, New Zealand =

Town in the West Coast Region of New Zealand

Ross
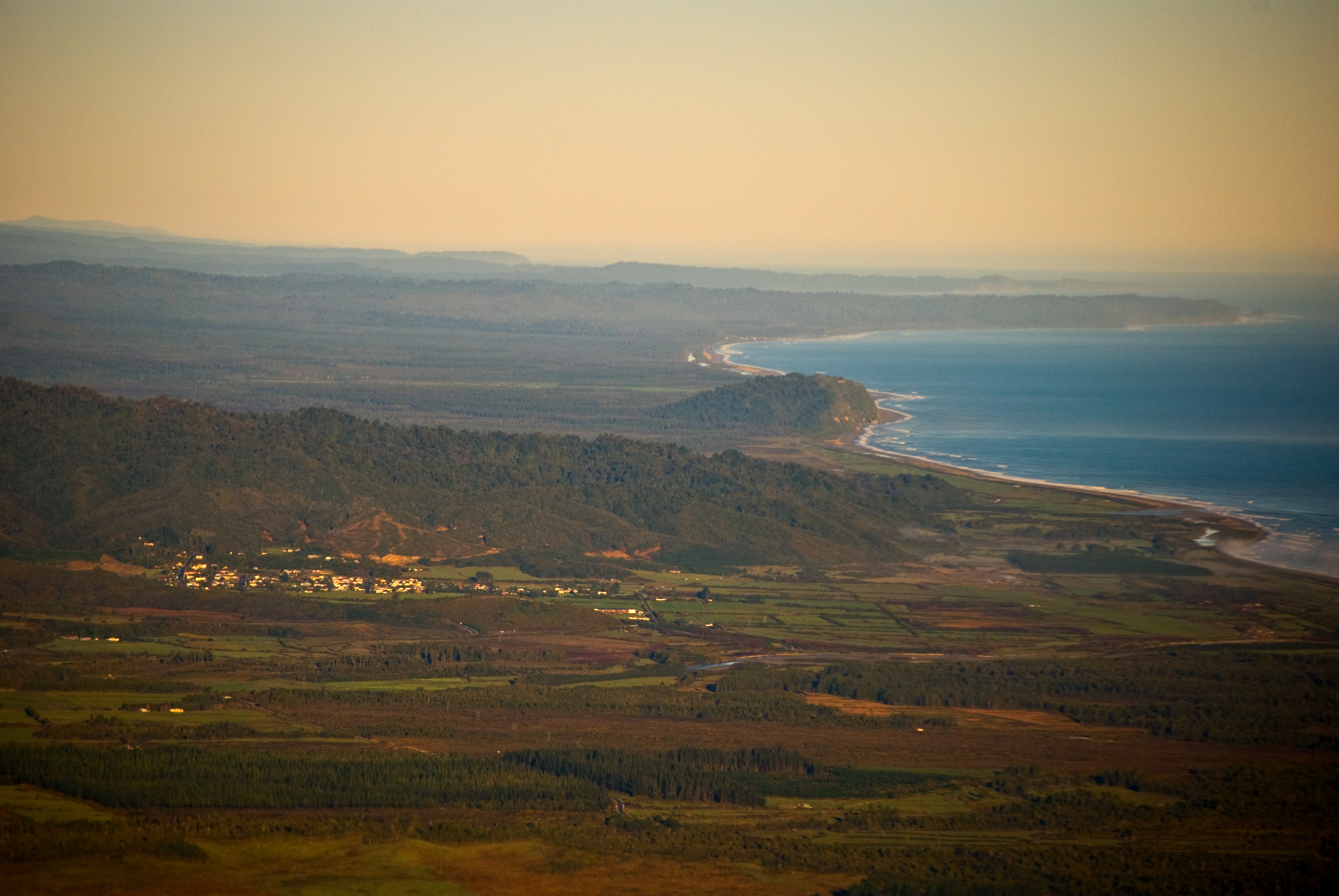
- An aerial photograph of Ross, with the Tasman Sea seen to the right
- Interactive map of Ross
- Coordinates: 42°53′45″S 170°48′51″E
- Country: New Zealand
- Region: West Coast
- District: Westland District
- Ward: Northern
- Electorates: West Coast-Tasman; Te Tai Tonga

Government
  - Territorial authority: Westland District Council
  - Regional council: West Coast Regional Council
  - Mayor of Westland: Helen Lash
  - West Coast-Tasman MP: Maureen Pugh
  - Te Tai Tonga MP: Tākuta Ferris

Area
  - Total: 8.87 km^{2} (3.42 sq mi)

Population (June 2025)
  - Total: 330
  - Density: 37/km^{2} (96/sq mi)
- Time zone: UTC+12 (NZST)
  - Summer (DST): UTC+13 (NZDT)
- Postcode: 7812
- Area code: 03
- Local iwi: Ngāi Tahu

Ross is a small town located in the Westland District on the West Coast of New Zealand's South Island, 27 kilometres (17 mi) south-west of Hokitika and 46 kilometres (29 mi) north-east of Hari Hari by road.

== History ==
Ross was established in the 1860s, during the West Coast gold rush, and became an important centre for miners. At its largest, the town had around 2,500 inhabitants, but the population declined after local goldfields were depleted in the early 1870s. Quartz was occasionally mined on Mount Greenland, a nearby ridge, but little more gold was found until two miners discovered a large 3.1-kilogram nugget in 1909, which was later named the "Honourable Roddy Nugget", after Roderick McKenzie, the Minister for Mines at the time.

From 1872 to the early 1900s a number of Chinese lived and worked in Ross, and a Chinese Miners' Memorial Garden on the shore of Ross Lake commemorates them.

The settlement was originally called Jones Flat, but was also sometimes known as Georgetown and Totara. It was given the name Rosstown, which was shortened to Ross in about 1866, after George Ross, who was the Canterbury Provincial Council's treasurer at the time of the naming.

== Local government ==
Following the abolition of Westland Province in 1876, Ross became part of Westland County. In 1878, Ross Borough was formed, with its own borough council and mayor, and remained in existence until 1972, when it merged back into Westland County. Since the local government reforms of 1989, Ross has been part of Westland District.

== Demographics ==
Ross is described by Stats NZ as a rural settlement and covers 8.87 km^{2} (3.42 sq mi). It had an estimated population of 330 as of June 2025, with a population density of 37 people per km^{2}. The settlement is part of the larger Waitaha statistical area.

Historical population for Ross
Year	Pop.	±% p.a.
2006	291	—
2013	297	+0.29%
2018	285	−0.82%
2023	309	+1.63%

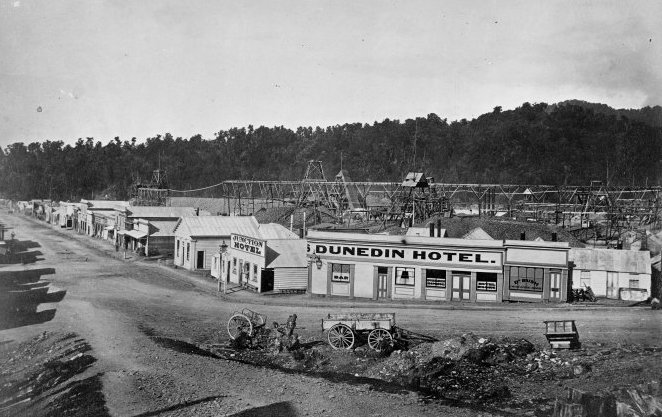
Aylmer Street, Ross, 1870; the Morning Star mine is visible in the background

Ross had a population of 309 in the 2023 New Zealand census, an increase of 24 people (8.4%) since the 2018 census, and an increase of 12 people (4.0%) since the 2013 census. There were 168 males and 138 females in 150 dwellings. 1.0% of people identified as LGBTIQ+. The median age was 54.4 years (compared with 38.1 years nationally). There were 42 people (13.6%) aged under 15 years, 27 (8.7%) aged 15 to 29, 144 (46.6%) aged 30 to 64, and 93 (30.1%) aged 65 or older.

People could identify as more than one ethnicity. The results were 91.3% European (Pākehā), 14.6% Māori, 1.0% Pasifika, 1.0% Asian, and 5.8% other, which includes people giving their ethnicity as "New Zealander". English was spoken by 98.1%, Māori by 1.9%, and other languages by 5.8%. No language could be spoken by 1.9% (e.g. too young to talk). The percentage of people born overseas was 8.7, compared with 28.8% nationally.

Religious affiliations were 23.3% Christian, 1.0% Buddhist, and 1.0% other religions. People who answered that they had no religion were 63.1%, and 10.7% of people did not answer the census question.

Of those at least 15 years old, 24 (9.0%) people had a bachelor's or higher degree, 141 (52.8%) had a post-high school certificate or diploma, and 105 (39.3%) people exclusively held high school qualifications. The median income was $28,600, compared with $41,500 nationally. 9 people (3.4%) earned over $100,000 compared to 12.1% nationally. The employment status of those at least 15 was 114 (42.7%) full-time, 39 (14.6%) part-time, and 3 (1.1%) unemployed.

=== Waitaha statistical area ===
Waitaha statistical area covers 1,497.78 km^{2} (578.30 sq mi) and had an estimated population of 510 as of June 2025, with a population density of 0.34 people per km^{2}.

Historical population for Waitaha
Year	Pop.	±% p.a.
2006	438	—
2013	471	+1.04%
2018	450	−0.91%
2023	471	+0.92%

Waitaha had a population of 471 in the 2023 New Zealand census, an increase of 21 people (4.7%) since the 2018 census, and unchanged since the 2013 census. There were 258 males and 210 females in 237 dwellings. 1.9% of people identified as LGBTIQ+. The median age was 52.2 years (compared with 38.1 years nationally). There were 66 people (14.0%) aged under 15 years, 57 (12.1%) aged 15 to 29, 231 (49.0%) aged 30 to 64, and 120 (25.5%) aged 65 or older.

People could identify as more than one ethnicity. The results were 90.4% European (Pākehā); 14.0% Māori; 0.6% Pasifika; 2.5% Asian; 0.6% Middle Eastern, Latin American and African New Zealanders (MELAA); and 5.1% other, which includes people giving their ethnicity as "New Zealander". English was spoken by 98.1%, Māori by 1.9%, and other languages by 7.0%. No language could be spoken by 1.9% (e.g. too young to talk). New Zealand Sign Language was known by 0.6%. The percentage of people born overseas was 10.8, compared with 28.8% nationally.

Religious affiliations were 22.9% Christian, 0.6% Buddhist, and 1.9% other religions. People who answered that they had no religion were 63.7%, and 10.8% of people did not answer the census question.

Of those at least 15 years old, 33 (8.1%) people had a bachelor's or higher degree, 231 (57.0%) had a post-high school certificate or diploma, and 144 (35.6%) people exclusively held high school qualifications. The median income was $30,300, compared with $41,500 nationally. 18 people (4.4%) earned over $100,000 compared to 12.1% nationally. The employment status of those at least 15 was 180 (44.4%) full-time, 57 (14.1%) part-time, and 6 (1.5%) unemployed.

== Economy ==
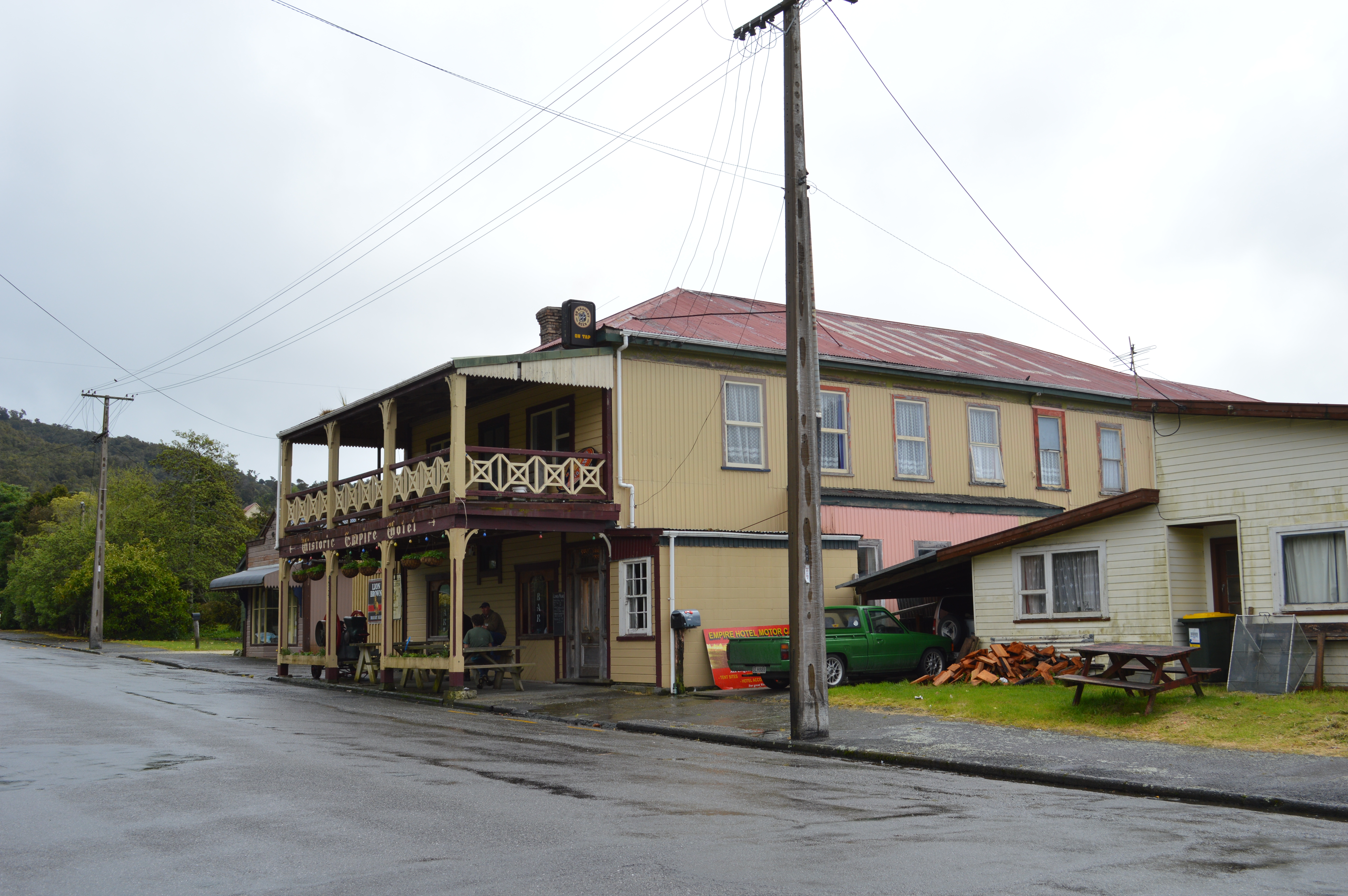
The Empire Hotel

The town's economy is based around farming and forestry; a large open-cut mine operated directly adjacent to the town since 1988, and the large pit it created was filled with water in the 2000s to create Ross Lake.

== Amenities and attractions ==
Amenities in Ross include a dairy/convenience store with a New Zealand Post agency and a small self-service petrol station, a volunteer fire brigade and a police station.

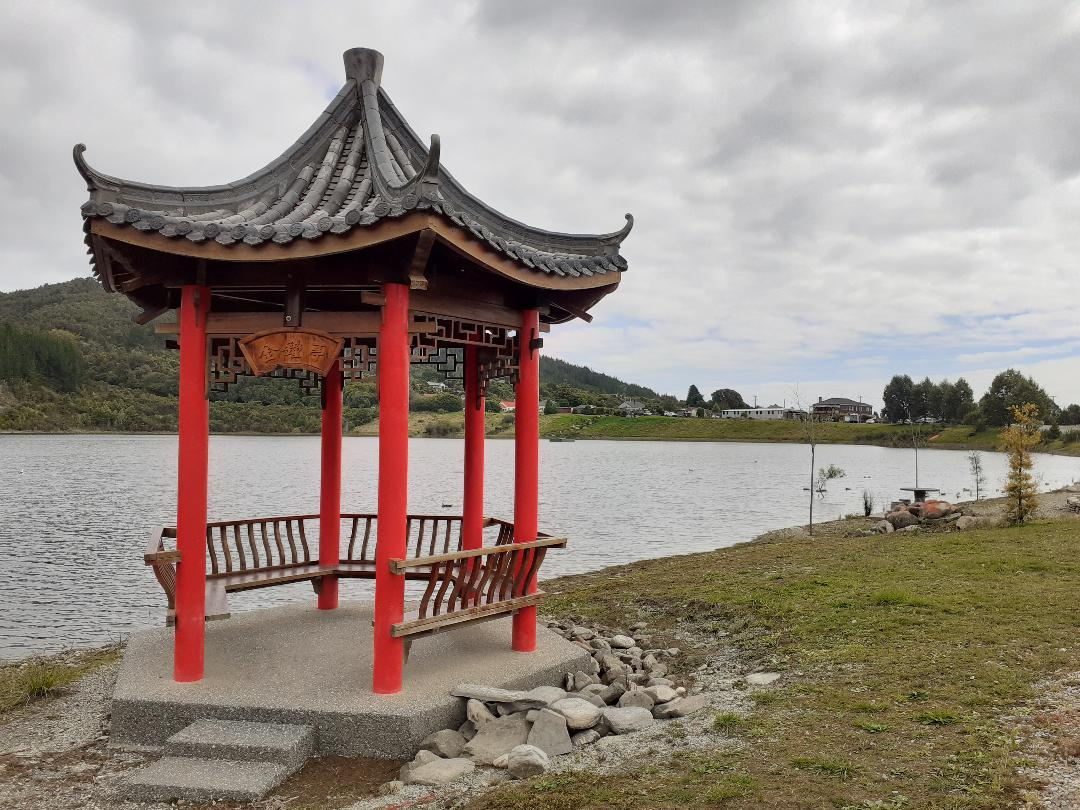
Chinese Miners' Memorial Garden

Beside Ross Lake is the Chinese Miners' Memorial Garden, created over a two-year period by the Ross volunteer group Westland Regional Environment Incorporated Society (WRENIS) led by Biddy Manera, at a cost of $180,000. It includes a Chinese pavilion (liang ting) and ornamental tree planting. In winter 2020 a slip in Jones Creek blocked the outlet of the lake, and the pavilion was flooded and thousands of dollars' worth of trees and shrubs were killed. Fully repairing the lake outlet would require a resource consent, so in the meantime WRENIS volunteers dug a small channel by hand to divert some of the flow of Jones Creek to a culvert, allowing lake levels to stabilise; work done by hand did not require a consent. Their work was repeatedly vandalised, however, for months and on an almost daily basis, causing the lake to rise and drown the gardens again. The Westland Regional Council, which manages waterways, was called in to support WRENIS's efforts. After two rounds of public consultation involving the Department of Conservation, the Westland District Council, and the Ross Community society, all parties agreed in March 2021 to lower the lake levels and prevent future flooding, with the District Council covering the cost of the resource consent.

== Education ==
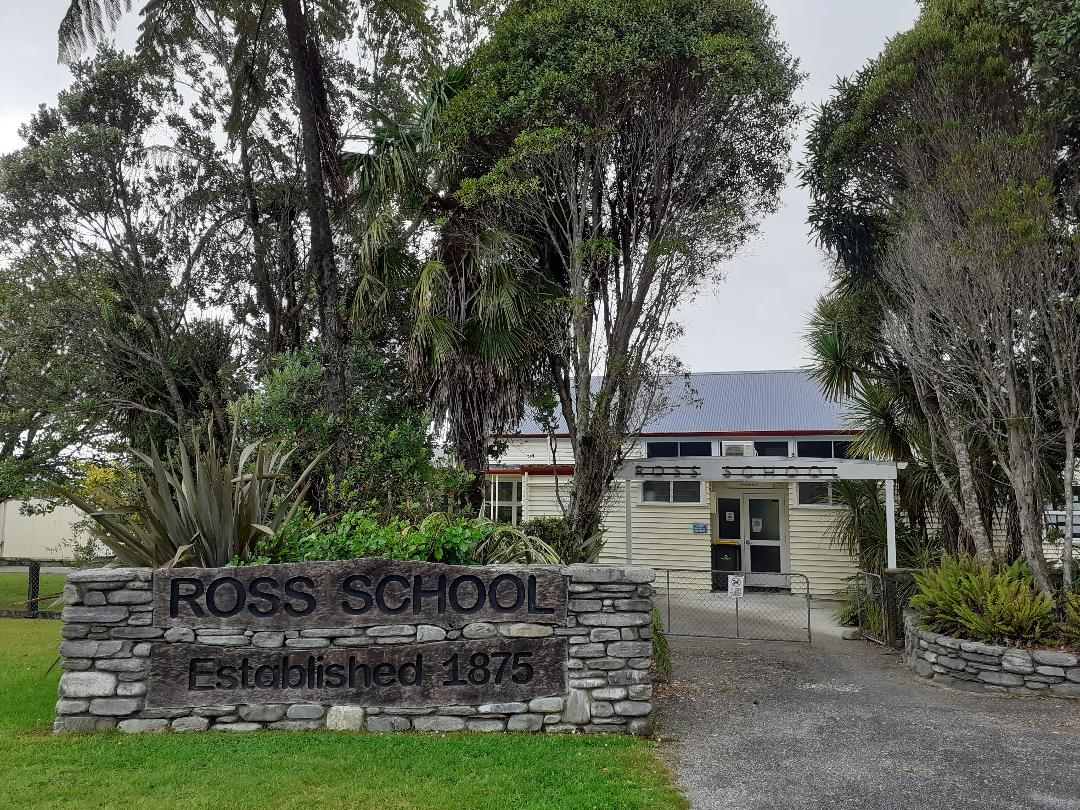
Ross School

Ross School is the sole school in the town. It is a coeducational contributing (year 1–6) primary school with a roll of 9 students as of July 2026. The school opened in 1875 and celebrated its 125th anniversary in 2000.

The Sisters of Mercy set up St Patrick's School in Ross in 1889. It closed in 1962.

The nearest intermediate and secondary school (year 7–13) is Westland High School in Hokitika.

== Transport and infrastructure ==
State Highway 6 passes through the town, connecting it in the north to Hokitika and south to Hari Hari and Franz Josef.

Intercity Coaches provides a bus service tor Ross with daily services to both Fox Glacier and Greymouth.

Ross is at the southern end of the West Coast Wilderness Trail, a cycle route with its northern end at Greymouth.

A branch line railway known as the Ross Branch was extended from Ruatapu to Ross on 1 April 1909, serving as the southern terminus of the line owned by the New Zealand Railways Department. However, a lengthy privately owned bush tramway ran south from the railway station to serve logging interests near Lake Ianthe and a railway extension from Ross through the Haast Pass to connect with the Otago Central Railway was proposed in the early 20th century, but did not eventuate. From the 1940s until 9 October 1962, a Vulcan railcar service operated directly from Christchurch to Ross twice a day. A lack of traffic and expensive maintenance costs meant the line was closed beyond Hokitika on 24 November 1980. Much of the old track bed between Ruatapu and Hokitika can be driven as it serves as an access road for local farmers, and a disused truss bridge still stands north of Ross.
