= Mayor of Westland =

Head of the municipal government of Westland, New Zealand

- Incumbent; Helen Lash since 2022
- Style: His/Her Worship
- Seat: Hokitika
- Term length: Three years
- Inaugural holder: Durham Havill
- Formation: 1989
- Salary: $105,174
- Website: Official website

The mayor of Westland officiates over the Westland District of New Zealand's South Island. It has been administered by Westland District Council since 1989. The current mayor is Helen Lash, who was elected in 2022.

== List of mayors ==
	Name	Portrait	Term
1	Durham Havill		1989–1998
2	John Drylie		1998–2004
3	Maureen Pugh		2004–2013
4	Mike Havill		2013–2016
5	Bruce Smith		2016–2022
6	Helen Lash		2022–present
