= Lake Mahinapua =

Lake in the West Coast Region of New Zealand

- Lake Māhinapua, Tāwiri a Te Makō
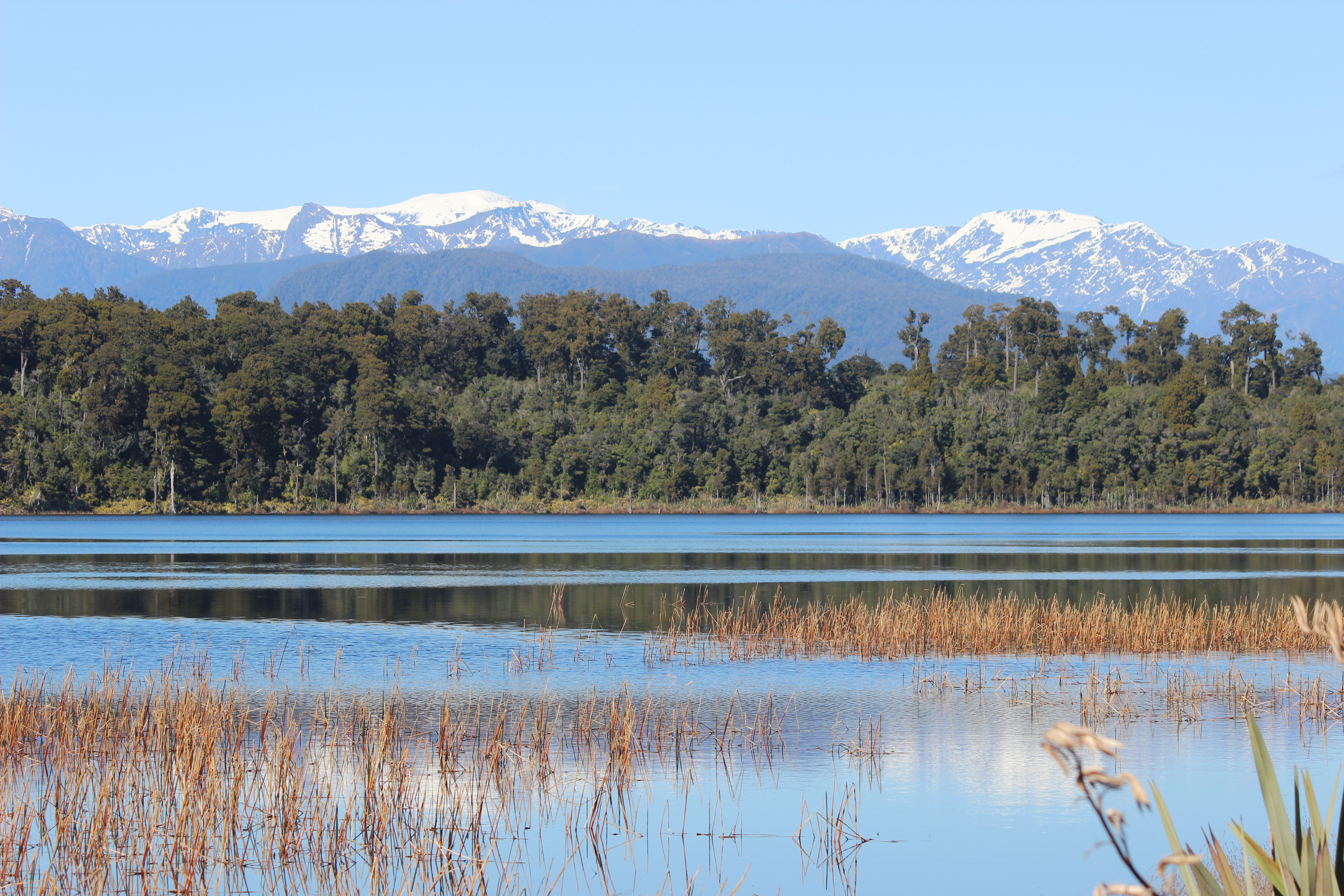
- Lake Mahinapua

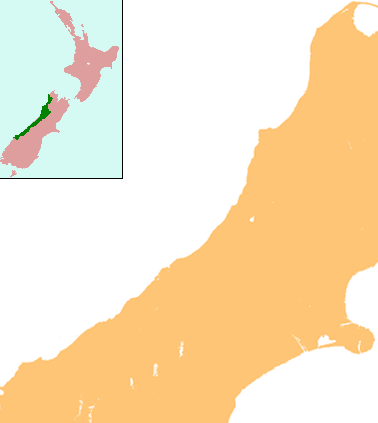
- Location within West Coast
- Interactive map of Lake Mahinapua
- Location: West Coast, South Island, New Zealand
- Coordinates: 42°48′S 170°55′E
- Primary inflows: Frosty Creek, Mirror Creek
- Primary outflows: Mahināpua Creek
- Basin countries: New Zealand
- Max. length: 3 kilometres (1.9 mi)
- Max. width: 2 kilometres (1.2 mi)
- Surface area: 3 square kilometres (1.2 sq mi)
- Surface elevation: 4 metres (13 ft)

Lake Mahinapua is a shallow lake on the West Coast of New Zealand's South Island. Once a lagoon at the mouth of the Hokitika River, it became a lake when the river shifted its course. Lake Māhinapua was the site of a significant battle between Ngāi Tahu and Ngāti Wairangi Māori, and is regarded by them as a sacred site where swimming and fishing are prohibited. In European times it was part of an inland waterway that carried timber and settlers between Hokitika and Ross until the building of the railway. Today, it is protected as a scenic reserve for boating, camping, and hiking.

== Name ==
The name comes from the Māori Māhina, a proper name, and pua, flower: Māhina's flower. There is not yet an agreed official spelling of the name in New Zealand English and it is commonly written without the macron, or with a macron on the second "a" (Mahināpua). Tūwharewhare / Mahināpua Creek's official name, confusingly, is currently spelled with a macron over the second "a".

== Geography ==
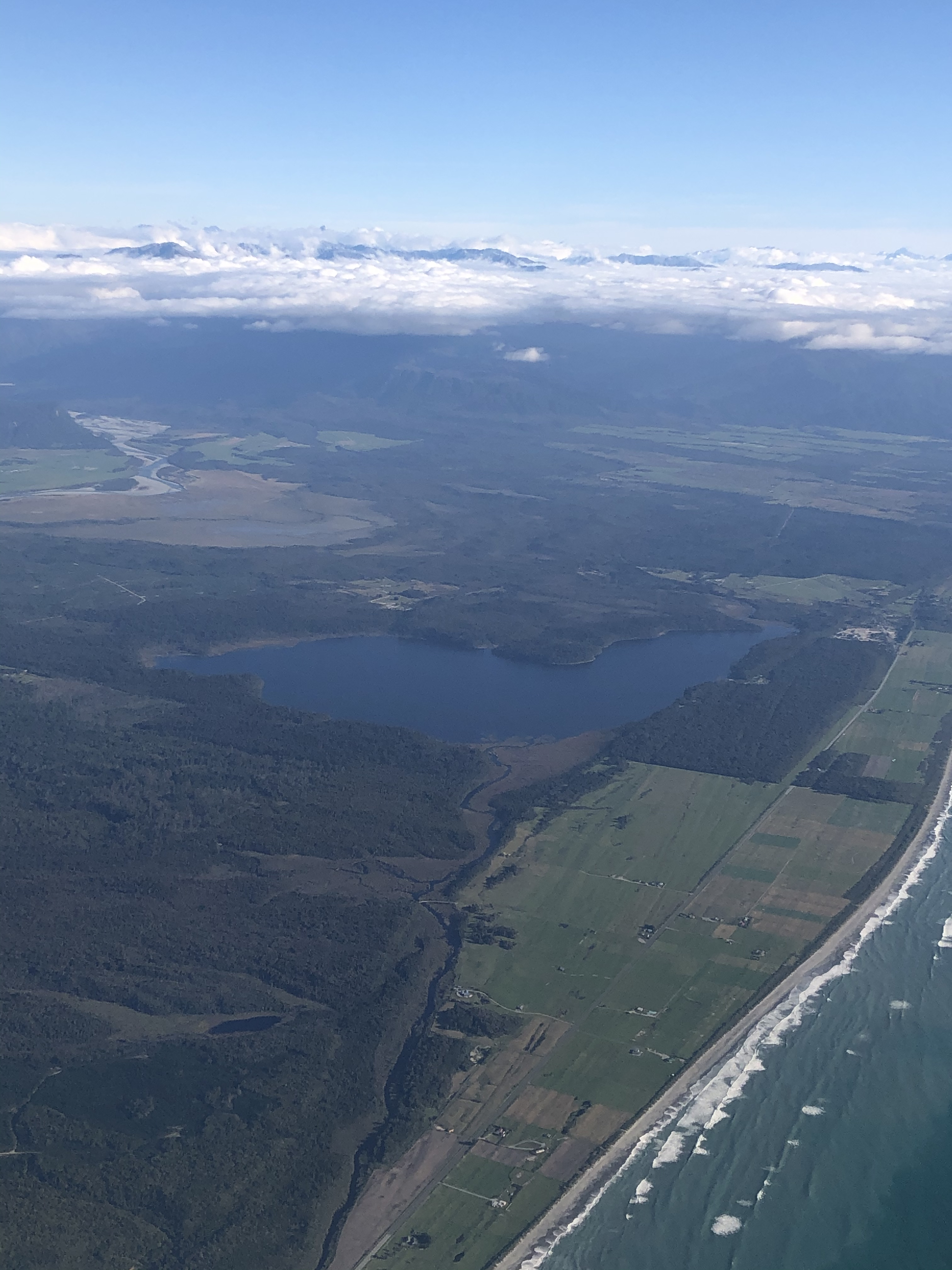
Aerial view of Lake Mahinapua from the north

The lake is beside State Highway 6 at the small town of Ruatapu, between Hokitika and Ross. The road to the lake turns off the highway 8 kilometres (5 mi) south of Hokitika and passes through a tunnel of native forest to the lake shore. The Mahinapua Walkway (the Mananui Tramline Track) can be reached from the western side of the lake 10 kilometres (6 mi) south of Hokitika or from its eastern terminus 14 kilometres (9 mi) south on Woodstock-Rimu Road; the walkway reaches Lake Mahinapua at Picnic Bay.

During the retreat of glaciers at the end of the Last Glacial Period 12,000 years ago, a series of glacial moraines was deposited along what is now the eastern (landward) side of the lake. What we now call the Hokitika River flowed to the sea between those moraines, where Lake Mahinapua is now. As the sea gradually rose and encroached on the land, it pushed a line of dunes before it, which created a shallow coastal lagoon roughly 500 metres (1,600 ft) from the Tasman Sea coast. The Hokitika River then changed course, shifting to its current mouth 8 km north and leaving behind a lake now fed by a series of small creeks.

== Flora and fauna ==
The forest around Lake Mahinapua ranges from rimu-kāmahi on the terraces and moraines left by the retreating glacier, to coastal dune forest that starts on ancient dunes (around the Jum Michel walk), through to low forest on more recent dunes (as seen at Mananui Bush). In the northern and southern wetlands bordering the lake grows kahikatea swamp forest and flax. Flax grows profusely along Mahināpua Creek, where it was cultivated for commercial harvest after the forest was cleared. This is one of the few areas on this part of the West Coast that preserves an almost continuous forest from the Southern Alps to the Tasman Sea. Both southern rātā and northern rātā are present at Lake Mahinapua; it is the southern limit for the latter species.

The lake is home to waterbirds such as black swans and mallard ducks. Royal spoonbills, grey ducks, and fernbirds can occasionally be seen; white herons (kōtuku) can be found seasonally around the shore or more commonly in the streams entering or leaving the lake. The southern crested grebe (Podiceps cristatus australis) and sometimes bitterns are rarely seen here. The surrounding bush contains bellbirds, tūī, kererū, and parakeets, as well as both long-tailed and shining cuckoos and brown creepers.

There are still small populations of shortfin eels and īnanga in Mahinapua, which coexist with introduced perch, tench, and brown bullhead catfish. Luckily rudd have not colonised the lake, but it contains invasive white waterlily (Nymphaea alba) and Cape pondweed (Aponogeton distachyos).

== Human history ==
Lake Mahinapua was important to Māori of the Pātea and Ngāti Wairangi tribes as a mahinga kai (food gathering place) and a source of kuta or bamboo spike sedge (Eleocharis sphacelata), important for weaving. Later, with the introduction of pounamu stone to tribes outside the area, raiding parties and battles became a regular occurrence. Lake Mahinapua was the site of a significant battle between Ngāi Tahu and Ngāti Wairangi in the late 17th century in which Ngāi Tahu mokihi (rafts) were overturned and many drowned. The piled-up bodies of chiefs on the lake's foreshore gave the battle its name: Tāwiri a Te Makō (heap of sharks). That name is also used for the lake in general. The site of the battle is regarded as a wāhi tapu (sacred place) and local Ngāi Tahu will not harvest food from the lake or swim in it. Control of the lakebed was vested in Poutini Ngāi Tahu as part of the Ngāi Tahu Claims Settlement Act 1998.

When the tide is high, it is possible to travel by small boat from the lake down Mahināpua Creek to Hokitika, a fact of great importance to Pākehā settlement before the building of a road. From 1865 boats were used to carry people and freight from Hokitika up the creek, crossing the lake and unloading at a portage landing beside Ruatapu, and continuing down a lagoon to Ross. In 1867 two small paddle steamers were built in Hokitika for this purpose, using equipment salved from shipwrecks. The remains of a later paddle steamer are on display at Shanghai Bay. From the 1880s to the 1960s timber (largely kahikatea) was milled in the coastal forest and after the timber was cleared flax was harvested along Māhinapua Creek. Both were transported back to Hokitika by barges or paddleboats until the opening of the Ross Branch railway. The railway opened to Ruatapu on 9 November 1906, was extended to Ross on 1 April 1909; it closed on 24 November 1980, but the historic Mahinapua Creek Railway Bridge has been preserved. Mining and gold dredging also occurred in the area. At the census of 1901, the population of Lake Mahinapua was eleven.

In 1893 nearly 100 hectares along the creek and lakeshore were gazetted as a reserve overseen by the Westland Acclimatisation Society. In 1907, the Lake Mahinapua Scenic Reserve was established to protect the land around the lake, and there are short walking tracks run through the bush – the Jum Michel Walk and Swimmers Beach Walk – as well as a 2 to 2½ hour walk that follows the route of a logging tramline to site of the Mananui Sawmill. In December 2012 the West Coast Treetop Walk opened on the edge of the Scenic Reserve, off Woodstock-Rimu Road. Shanghai Bay on the southwestern shore was made a recreation reserve in 1974. A campground and the Lake Mahinapua Aquatic Club is based there, and sailing, kayaking and kayaking is popular – it is possible to kayak 9 km through forest and swampland to Hokitika, or up Mirror Creek at the opposite end of the lake. Despite the lake's wāhi tapu status, swimming, fishing and duck shooting is common.

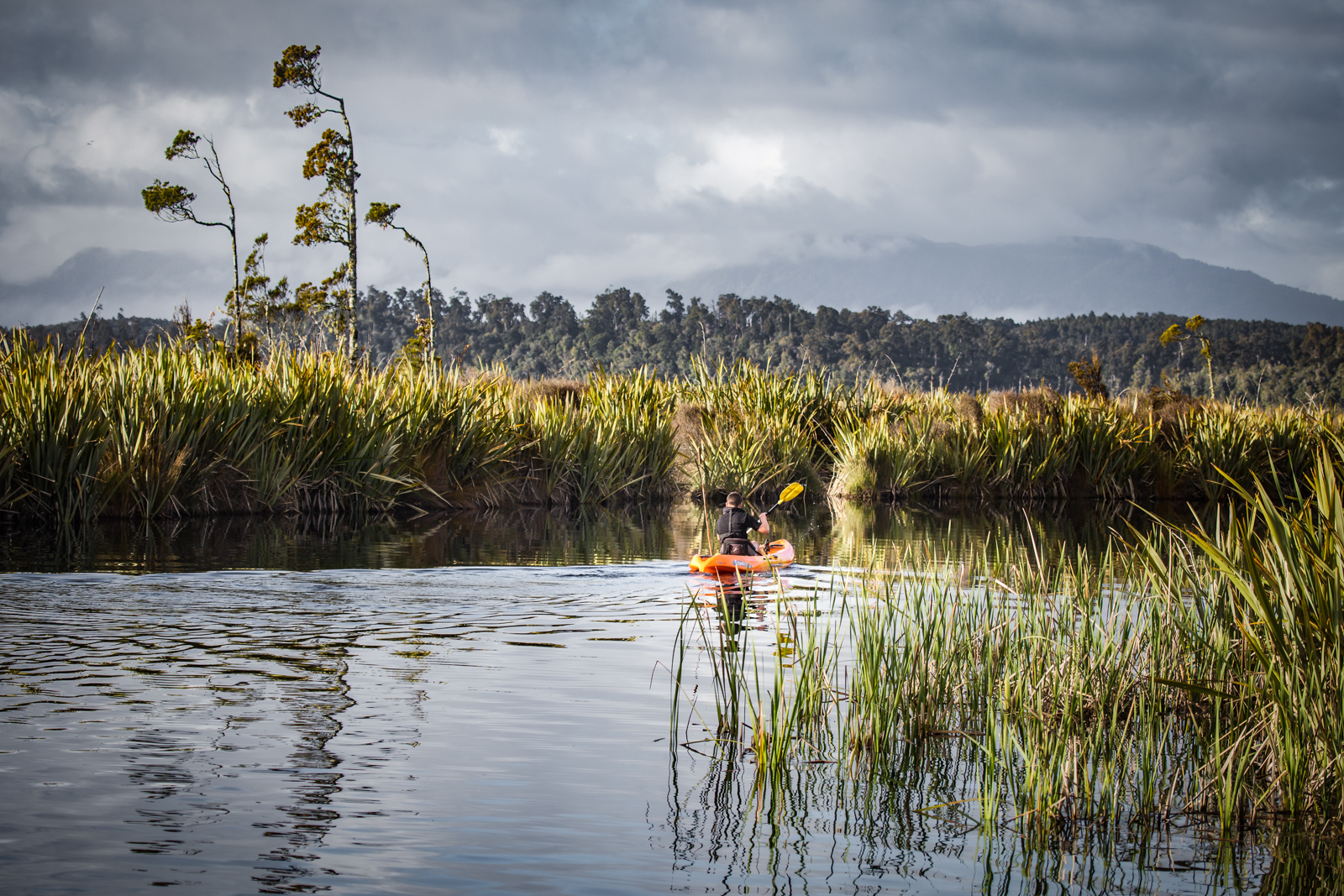
A kayaker on Mahināpua Creek

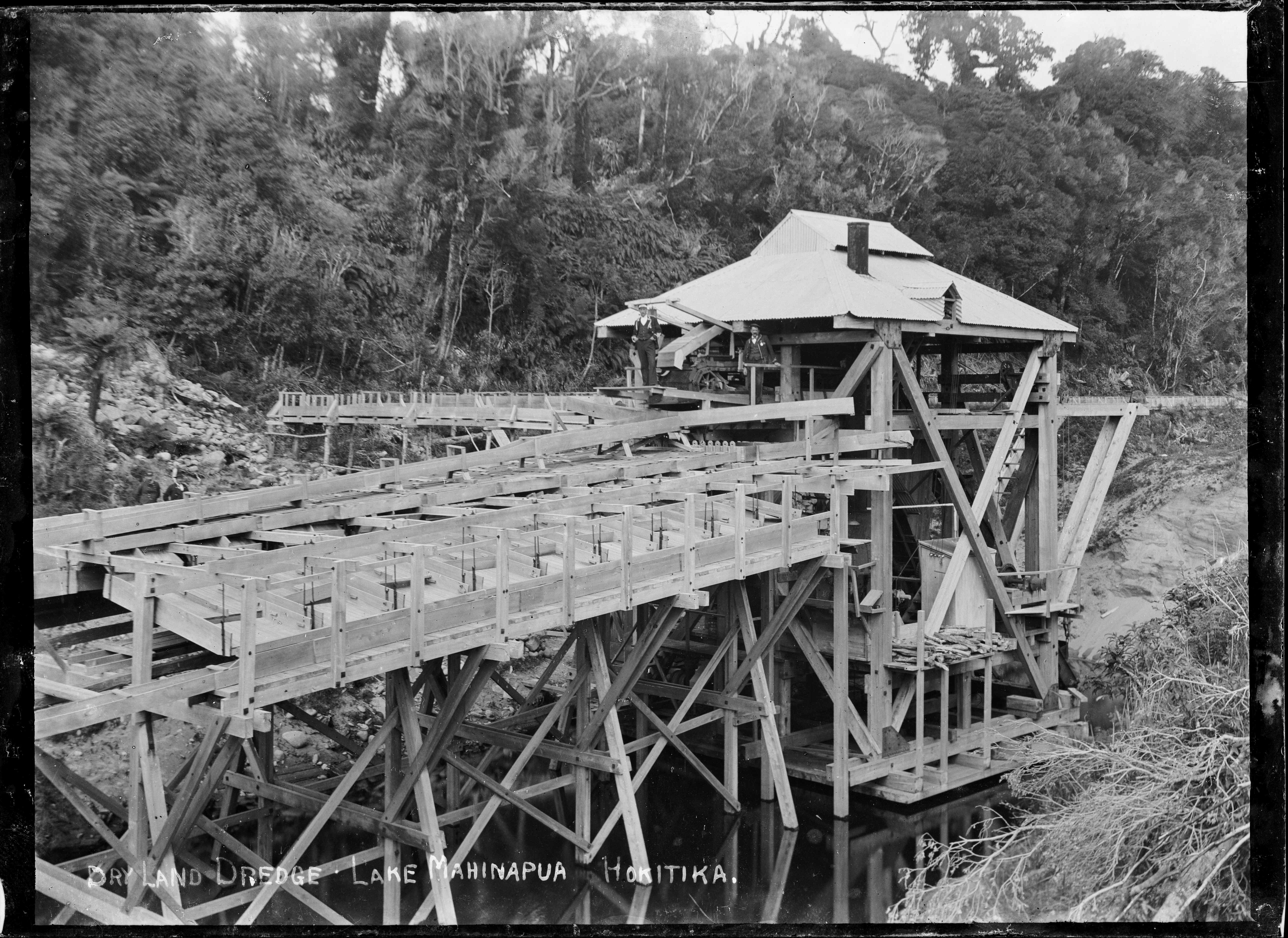
Dry land dredge operating at the lake

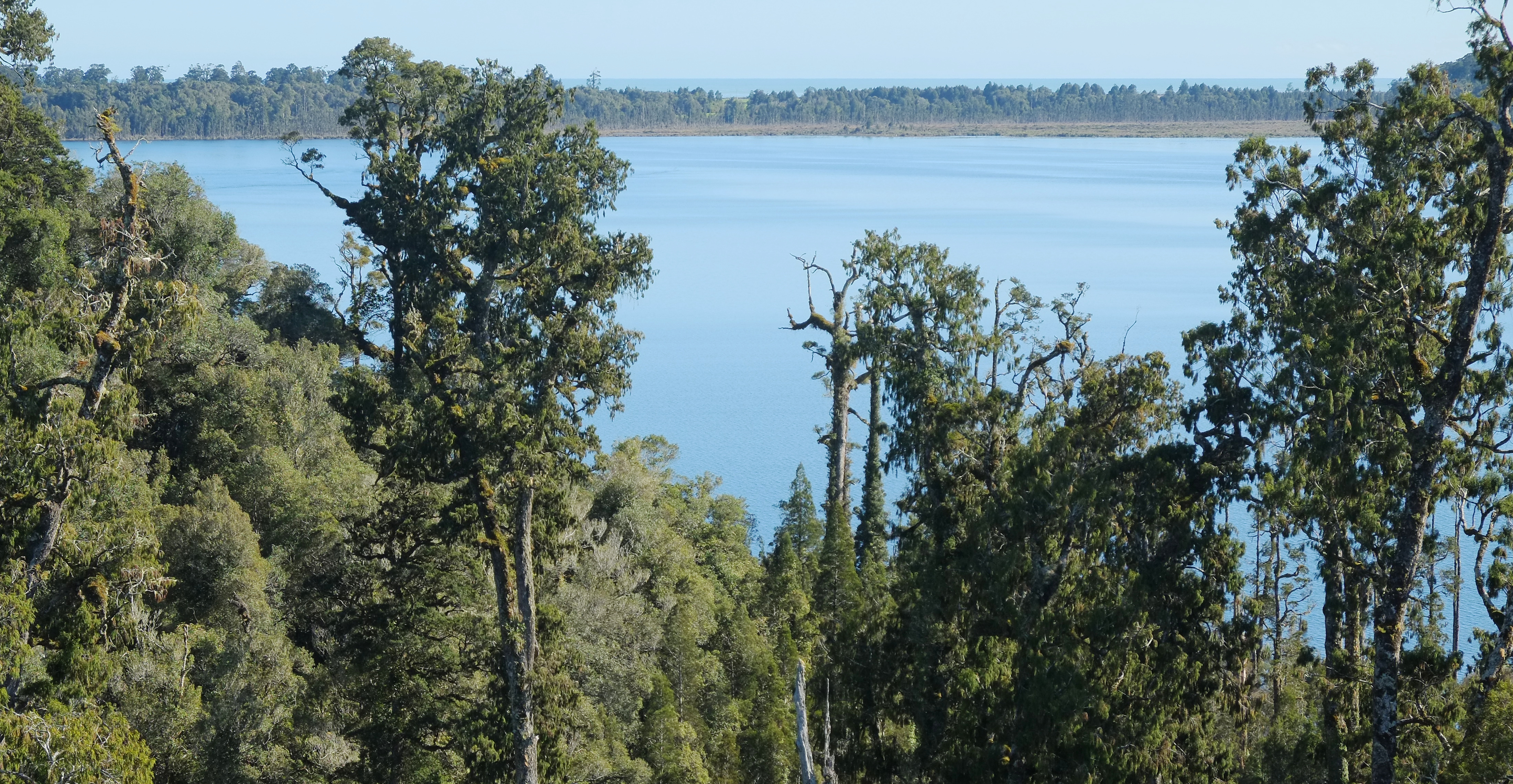
View from a tower on the nearby West Coast Treetop Walk

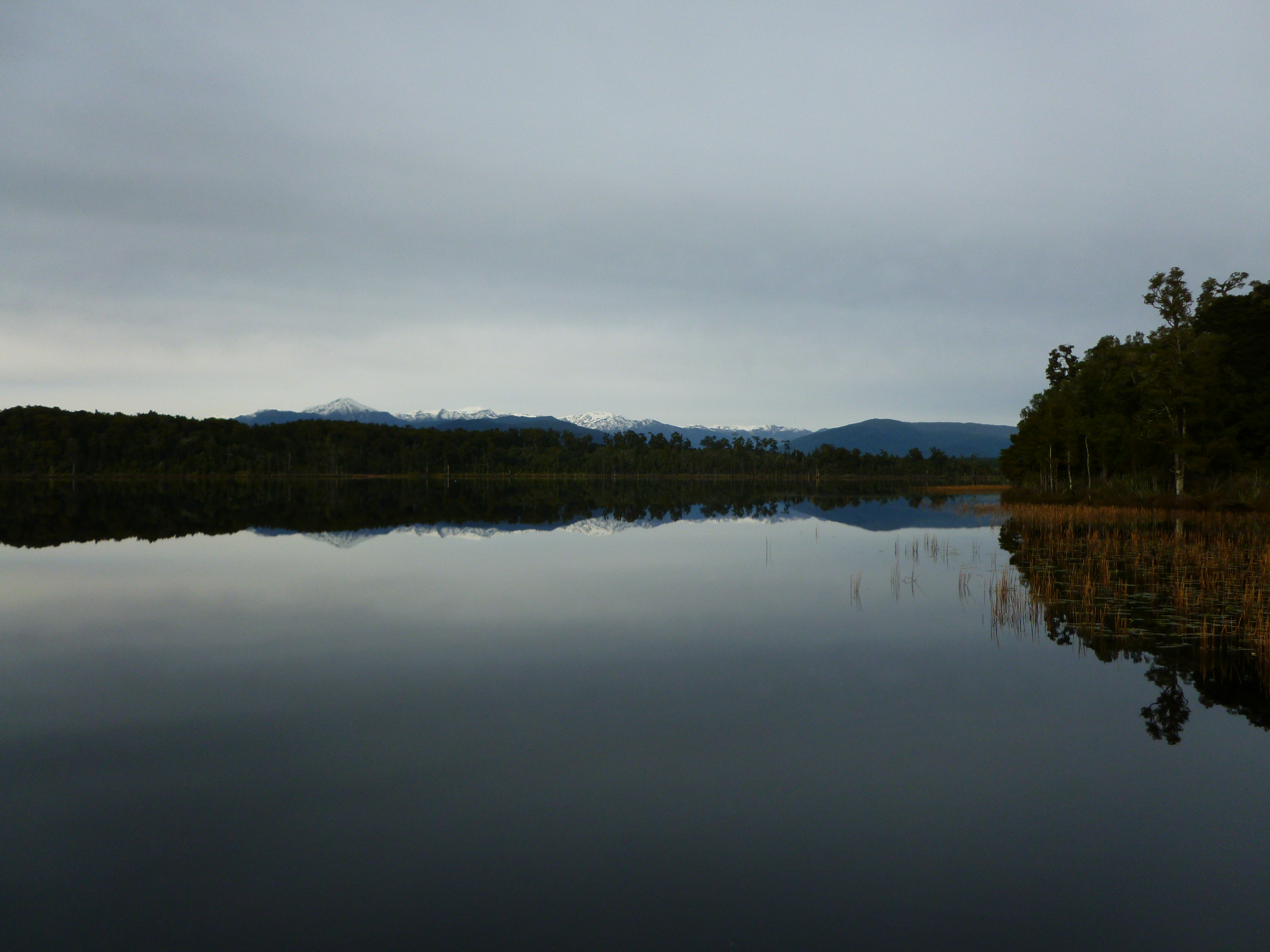
Reflection of the Southern Alps in the lake

== See also ==
Lakes of New Zealand
