= West Coast Treetop Walk =

Walkway in the West Coast Region of New Zealand

Coordinates: 42°48′24″S 170°55′18″E

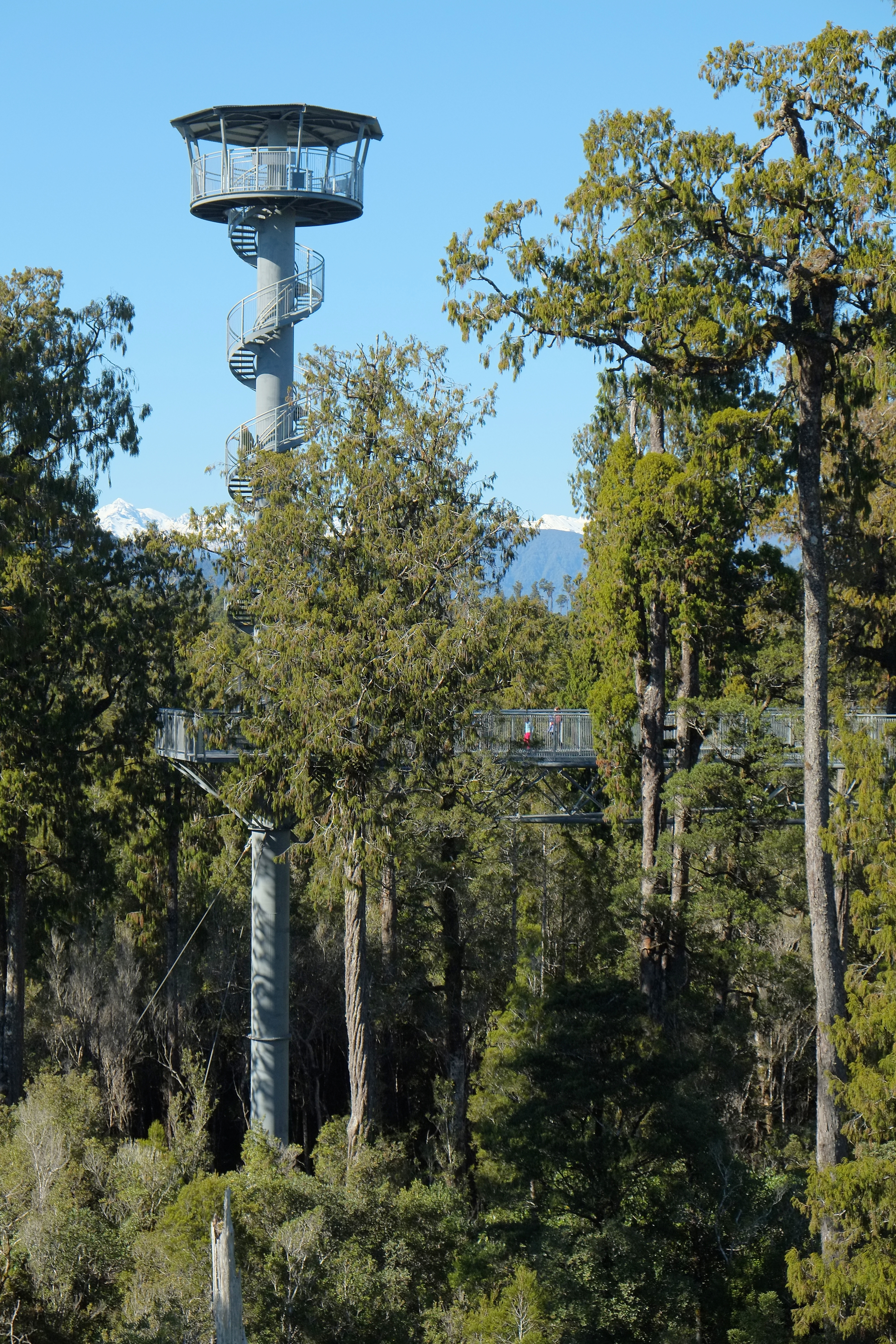
Tower and treetop walkway

The West Coast Treetop Walk is a canopy walkway through mature rimu forest near Hokitika on the West Coast of the South Island of New Zealand. The tourist attraction was built by Australian eco-tourism company 'Canopy01' in 2012 and comprises a 450 metres (1,480 ft) long elevated steel walkway, viewing tower, and cantilever.

The walkway leads through the canopy of mature native West Coast forest dominated by rimu at a height of around 20 to 25 metres (66 to 82 ft) above ground. It passes close to the crowns of mature rimu trees and sits above smaller trees and tree ferns. The loop walk takes in views of the nearby Lake Mahinapua and includes a cantilever extending out into the forest canopy. A 47 metres (154 ft) tall steel viewing tower, with a spiral staircase, has views over the surrounding forest and northern ranges of the Southern Alps including Toaroha Range, Diedrichs Range and Mt O'Connor.

The tourist attraction is locally run via a 45-year concession lease from the Department of Conservation NZ and includes a car park and cafe, with the actual canopy walkway accessible via a 5-minute walk from the cafe.

== Gallery ==
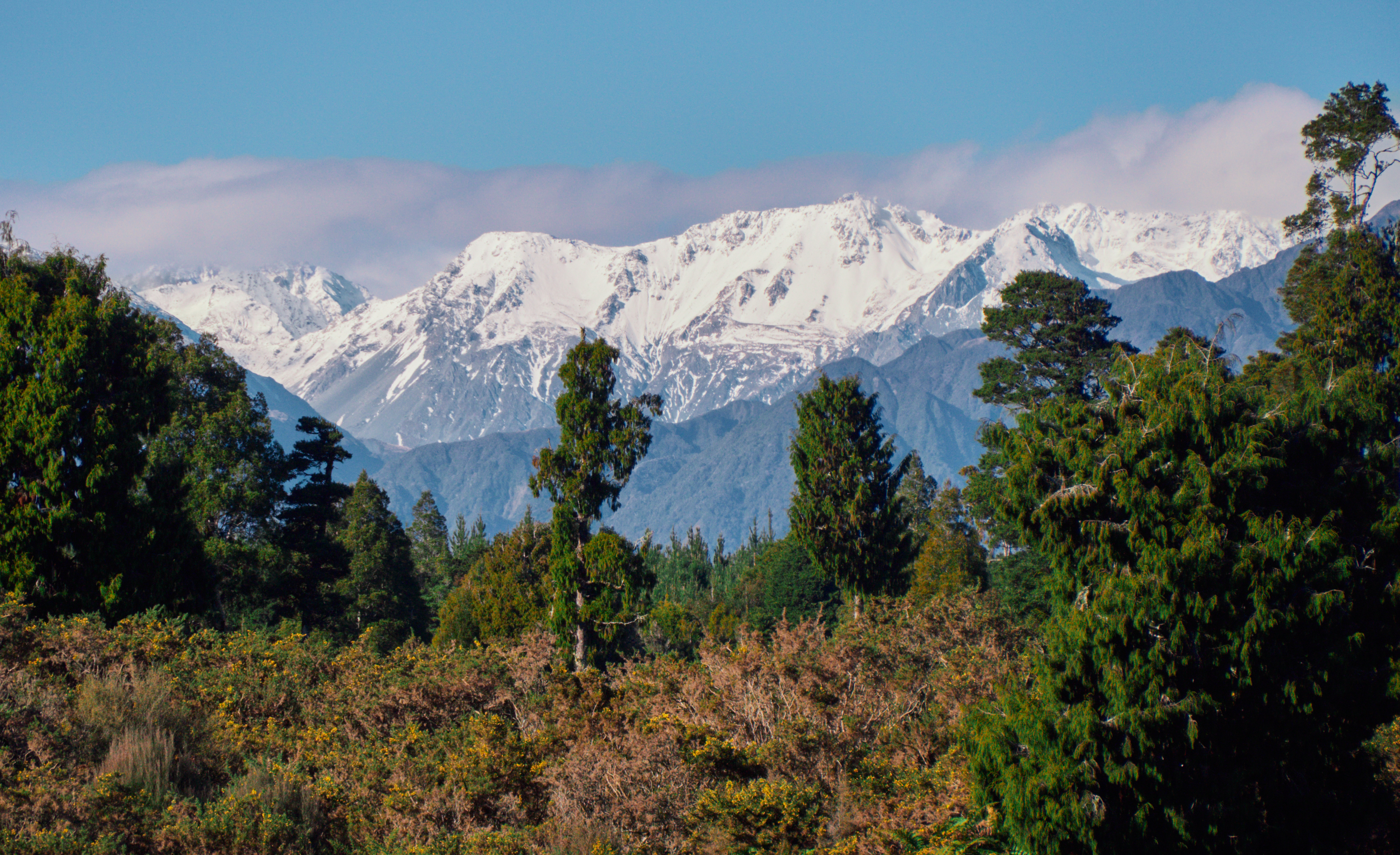
Snow-capped mountains of the Southern Alps rising above rimu rainforest on the West Coast of the South Island.

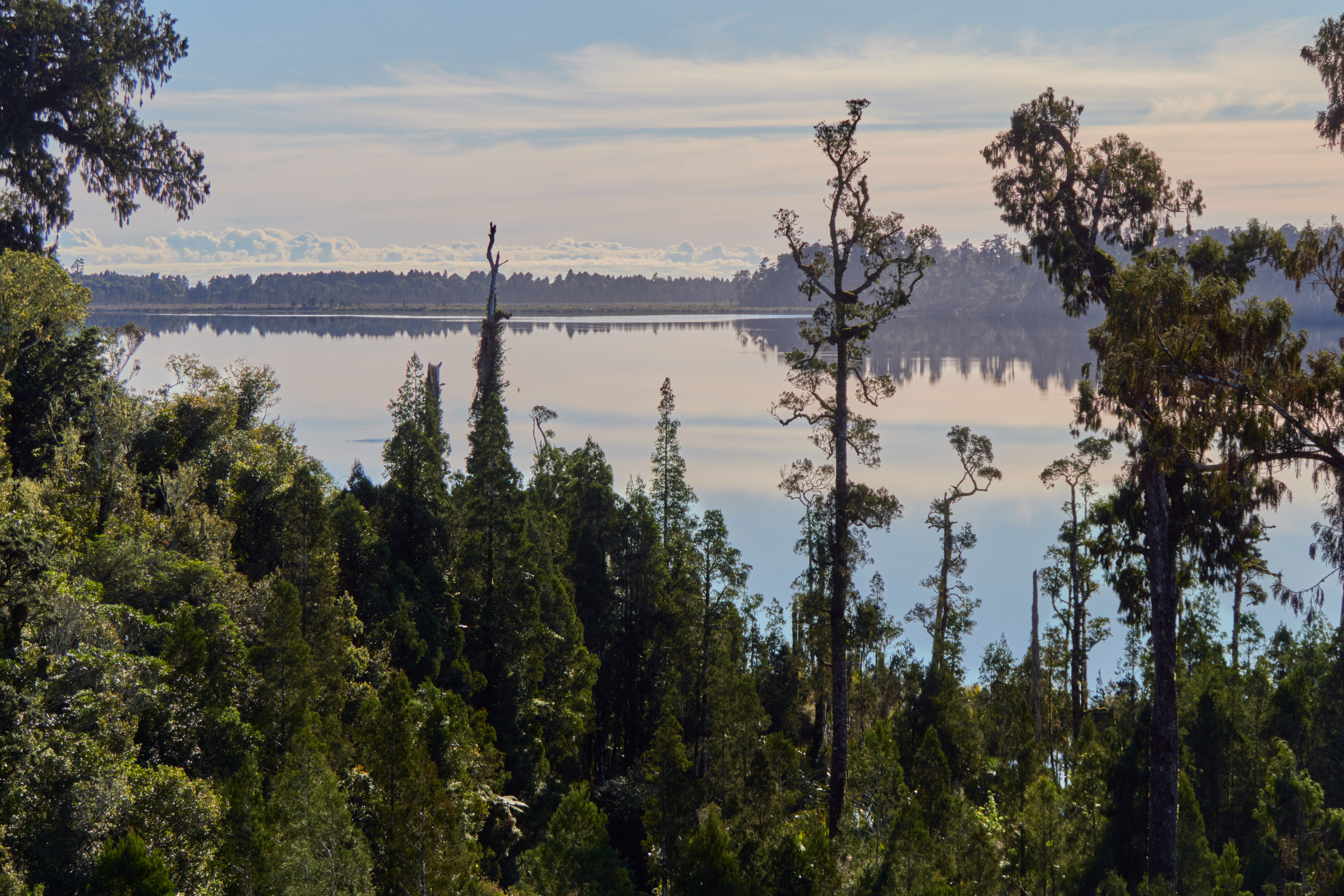
View of a lake through rimu rainforest canopy at the West Coast Treetop Walk.

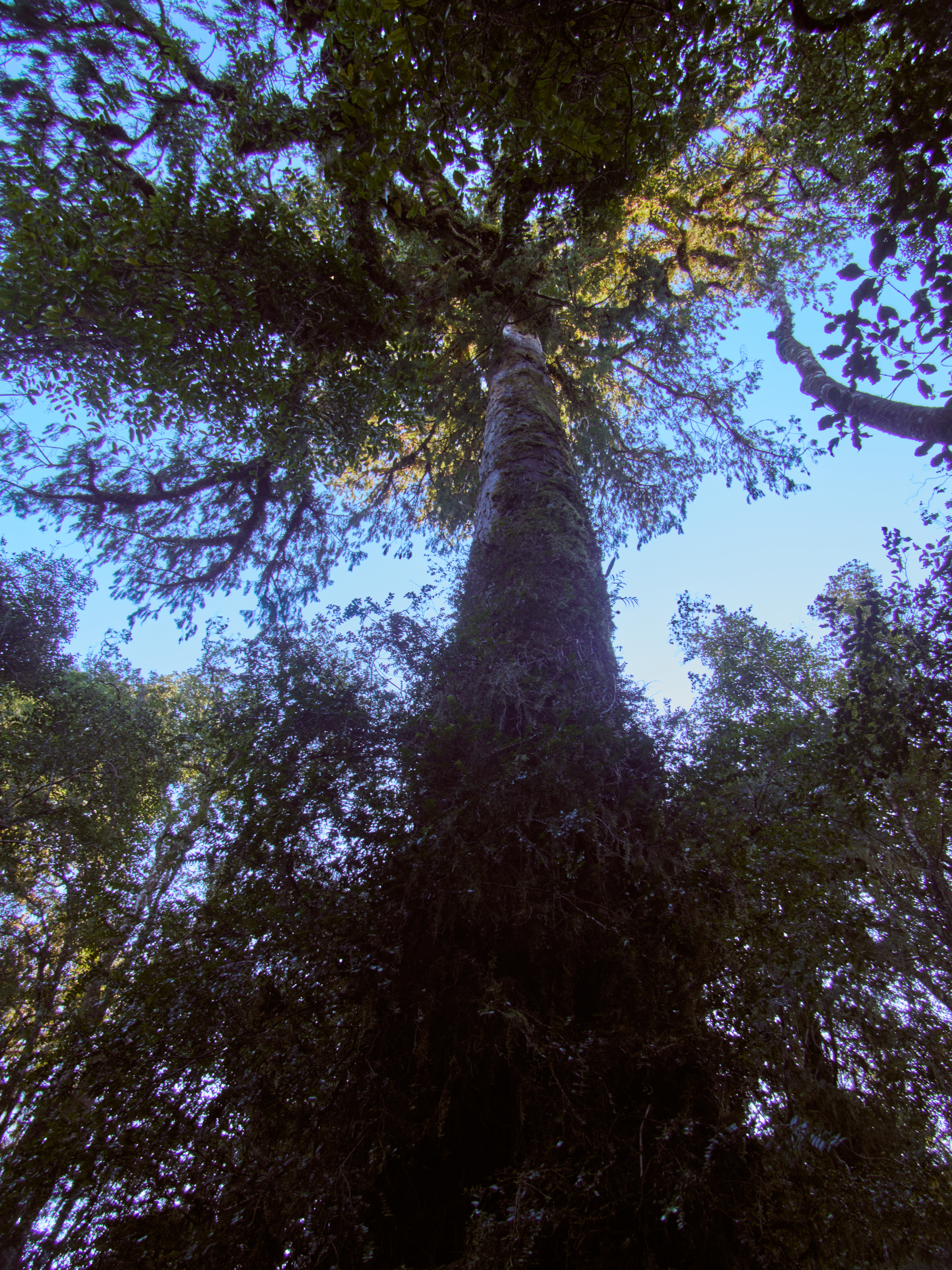
A rimu tree photographed from ground level looking up through the forest canopy at the West Coast Treetop Walk.

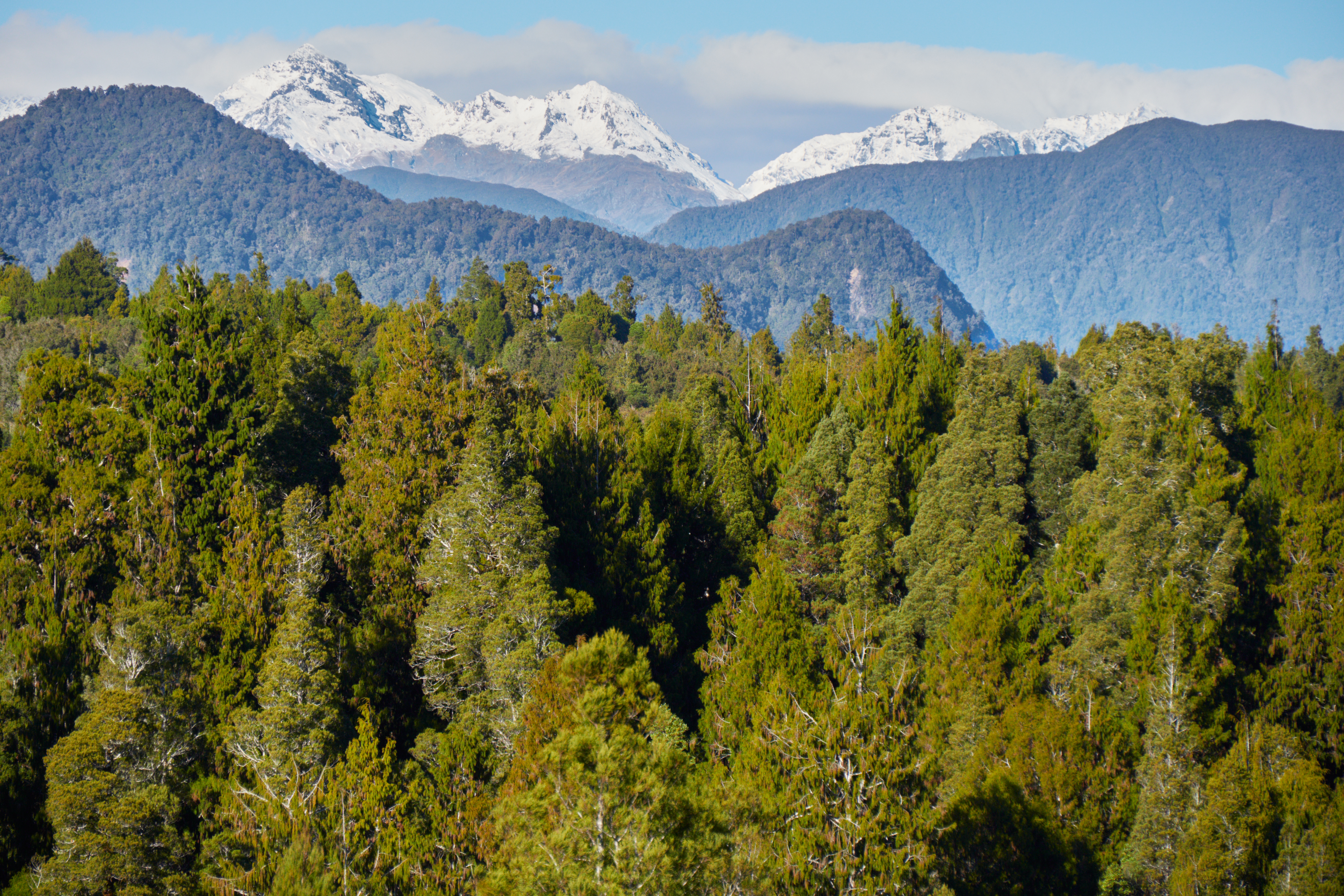
Rimu rainforest canopy at the West Coast Treetop Walk, with snow-capped Southern Alps in the background.
