= October 1941 =

Month of 1941

<<	October 1941					>>
Su	Mo	Tu	We	Th	Fr	Sa
			1	2	3	4
5	6	7	8	9	10	11
12	13	14	15	16	17	18
19	20	21	22	23	24	25
26	27	28	29	30	31

The following events occurred in October 1941:

== October 1, 1941 (Wednesday) ==
- The Moscow Conference ended. The United States agreed to supply the Soviets with $1 billion worth of arms and equipment.
- Finnish VII Corps captured Petrozavodsk.
- Majdanek concentration camp became operational.
- The stage musical Best Foot Forward by Hugh Martin and Ralph Blane premiered at the Ethel Barrymore Theatre on Broadway.

== October 2, 1941 (Thursday) ==
- The Battle of Moscow began.
- Adolf Hitler issued a message to the German troops on the Eastern Front declaring, "Today begins the last great, decisive battle of this year."
- 2,146 Jews were shot dead in the Lithuanian town of Žagarė.
- Paul Collette, the man who tried to assassinate Pierre Laval in August, was sentenced to death. The following day Philippe Pétain commuted the sentence to life imprisonment.
- German submarines U-377 and U-590 were commissioned.
- The Western film Honky Tonk starring Clark Gable and Lana Turner premiered at the Capitol Theatre in New York City.

== October 3, 1941 (Friday) ==
- Hitler made a public speech at the Berlin Sportpalast, his first since the German invasion of the Soviet Union began. Hitler declared that Russia was "to a great extent" already destroyed and that Germany had the capability to "beat all possible enemies" no matter "how many billions they are going to spend," a remark that appeared to be directed at the United States.
- The Fadden government resigned in Australia after being defeated on a budget vote.
- The film noir The Maltese Falcon starring Humphrey Bogart and Mary Astor premiered in New York City.
- Born: Chubby Checker, singer and songwriter, in Spring Gully, South Carolina; Nicolae Șerban Tanașoca, Romanian historian and philologist (d. 2017).

== October 4, 1941 (Saturday) ==
- The first jet engine built by the Allies arrives from England to an airport in the United States (Boston), to be modified for mass production by General Electric (GE).
- The German submarine U-111 was sunk southwest of Tenerife by depth charges from the trawler HMS Lady Shirley.
- New Zealand Parliament passed a bill guaranteeing free medical care for all citizens.
- Norwegians were warned by their German occupiers that they would face starvation if anti-Nazi unrest continued.
- German submarines U-159 and U-252 were commissioned.
- "Piano Concerto in B Flat" by Freddy Martin and His Orchestra went to #1 on the Billboard singles charts.
- Born: Roy Blount, Jr., writer and humorist, in Indianapolis, Indiana; Elizabeth Eckford, one of the Little Rock Nine, in Little Rock, Arkansas; Anne Rice, author, in New Orleans, Louisiana (d. 2021)

== October 5, 1941 (Sunday) ==
- Hermann Hoth took over command of the 17th Army from Carl-Heinrich von Stülpnagel.
- The German 2nd Panzer Army was formed from the 2nd Panzer Group.
- Born: Eduardo Duhalde, President of Argentina, in Lomas de Zamora, Argentina
- Died: Louis Brandeis, 84, American lawyer and associate justice of the U.S. Supreme Court 1916–1939

== October 6, 1941 (Monday) ==
- Paul von Kleist's forces reached Berdiansk on the Sea of Azov.
- The British cargo ship Thistlegorm was bombed and sunk in the Red Sea off Ras Muhammad by the Luftwaffe.
- The New York Yankees beat the Brooklyn Dodgers 3–1 to win the World Series four games to one.

== October 7, 1941 (Tuesday) ==
- Army Group Centre encountered snowfall for the first time in the drive on Moscow.
- 7th and 10th Panzer Divisions completed the encirclement of Soviet forces at Vyazma.
- Joseph Stalin lifted the Soviet Union's ban on religion in order to boost morale in the country.
- John Curtin became 14th Prime Minister of Australia.
- Panamian President Arnulfo Arias fled the country after his government was toppled in a U.S.-backed coup.
- The Soviet mine storage hulk Blokshiv No. 1 was sunk by German artillery in Kronstadt harbour.

== October 8, 1941 (Wednesday) ==
- The Battle of Changsha ended in Chinese victory.
- The Siege of Odessa (1941) began.
- The Germans captured Mariupol on the Sea of Azov and Oryol southwest of Moscow.
- U.S. President Franklin D. Roosevelt sent Stalin a short message stating that he was "confident that ways will be found to provide the material and supplies necessary to fight Hitler on all fronts, including your own. I want particularly to take this occasion to express my great confidence that your armies will ultimately prevail over Hitler and to assure you of our great determination to be of every possible material assistance."
- Near Hokitika, New Zealand, farmer Stanley Graham went on a shooting rampage after a dispute with a neighbour and killed seven people, including four police officers who were called in after the initial argument. The biggest manhunt in New Zealand history commenced.
- German submarines U-507 and U-657 were commissioned.
- Born: Jesse Jackson, civil rights activist and politician, in Greenville, South Carolina (d. 2026)
- Died: Gus Kahn, 54, American lyricist; Valentine O'Hara, 66, Irish author

== October 9, 1941 (Thursday) ==
- President Roosevelt asked Congress for immediate authority to arm American merchant ships. "We will not let Hitler prescribe the waters of the world which our ships may travel," the president said. "The American flag is not going to be driven from the seas either by his submarines, his airplanes or his threats."
- The Vichy Supreme Court indicted Léon Blum, Édouard Daladier, Guy La Chambre, Maurice Gamelin and Robert Jacomet for treason against their duties to the state during the years leading up to France's defeat in 1940. The defendants would go on trial beginning in February 1942 in proceedings that would be known as the Riom Trial.
- Ricardo Adolfo de la Guardia Arango became President of Panama.
- German submarines U-334 and U-591 were commissioned.
- Born: Trent Lott, politician, in Grenada, Mississippi
- Died: Helen Morgan, 41, American singer and actress

== October 10, 1941 (Friday) ==
- Georgy Zhukov was called from Leningrad to Moscow to take command of the capital's defense.
- Hitler issued Directive No. 37, Reorganizing forces in the Arctic.
- Walther von Reichenau promulgated the Severity Order, paving the way for the mass murder of Jews.
- The comedy film Never Give a Sucker an Even Break starring W. C. Fields was released.
- Born: Peter Coyote, actor and narrator, in New York City

== October 11, 1941 (Saturday) ==
- President Roosevelt wrote to Winston Churchill requesting a gentleman's agreement to share information on atomic research. Churchill would write back in December accepting the request.
- The Soviet government announced the evacuation from Moscow of all women and children not engaged in war work.
- German submarine U-209 was commissioned.
- Born: Lester Bowie, jazz trumpet player and composer, in Frederick, Maryland (d. 1999)
- Died: Edward Mark Best, 41 or 42, New Zealand police officer (mortally wounded by Stanley Graham on October 8); Charles Treat, 81, American major general

== October 12, 1941 (Sunday) ==
- German forces launched an attack against the Soviet garrison on the island of Hiiumaa in the Baltic Sea. Despite being outnumbered and lacking in ammunition, the garrison would hold out for six days.
- The all-Spanish volunteer Blue Division was deployed on the Volkhov River near Leningrad.
- The Bloody Sunday massacre took place in Stanisławów Ghetto.

== October 13, 1941 (Monday) ==
- The Battle at Borodino Field began on the Eastern Front.
- German forces captured Kalinin and Rzhev northwest of Moscow.
- Kaluga southwest of Moscow fell to the Germans.
- Born: Paul Simon, singer-songwriter, in Newark, New Jersey
- Died: David Devant, 73, English stage magician

== October 14, 1941 (Tuesday) ==
- Ordnungspolizei Chief Kurt Daluege signed the first order for the deportation of Berlin's Jews to the occupied territories of the east.
- The United States and Argentina signed a trade agreement lowering duties on many imports to Argentina from the United States. The Americans were eager to get the deal signed in order to keep Argentina out of the economic sphere of the Axis.
- Italian Defence Chief Ugo Cavallero ordered that plans be completed for the occupation of Malta and that special units be trained to participate in the operation.
- SS-Obergruppenführer and Waffen-SS General Paul Hausser was wounded in action on the Eastern Front and lost the sight in his right eye. He would subsequently wear a black eyepatch that would become his trademark.
- Army Group Centre commander Fedor von Bock announces the Vyazma Encirclement was over.
- Died: Marie Frances Lisette Hanbury, British peeress and suffragist (b. 1868)

== October 15, 1941 (Wednesday) ==
- The Soviets withdrew from Odessa at night.
- The Germans reached Mozhaysk, west of Moscow.
- Most of the Soviet government evacuated Moscow, although Stalin remained in the capital.
- German authorities announced that any Jews found outside of ghetto walls in Poland would be executed on sight.
- The first Canadian built Fort ship, the Fort St. James, launched for use by Britain.
- German submarine U-88 was commissioned.
- The comic book characters Archie Andrews, Betty Cooper and Jughead Jones all made their first appearances in Pep Comics issue #22 (cover date December).

== October 16, 1941 (Thursday) ==
- The Siege of Odessa ended in Pyrrhic Axis victory.
- The Jewish population of Lubny and neighbouring towns were ordered to report for relocation. The 1,900 Jews who obeyed the order were taken to an antitank trench outside the town and shot.
- The British corvette HMS Gladiolus was lost while escorting convoy SC 48. The cause of its loss is unknown.
- Due to pressure from the Germans, Philippe Pétain announced that he had condemned Blum, Daladier and Gamelin to life imprisonment, long before their trial could even begin. Pétain justified the action under Constitutional Act No. 7 dated January 27, 1941, even though it was illegal to apply it retroactively.
- German submarines U-160, U-592 and U-703 were commissioned.
- Born: Tim McCarver, baseball player and sportscaster, in Memphis, Tennessee (d. 2023)
- Died: Sergei Efron, 48, Russian poet and military officer (executed); Harold Fowler McCormick, 69, American businessman

== October 17, 1941 (Friday) ==
- Kearny incident: the American destroyer USS Kearny, dispatched to defend Allied convoy SC 48 from a German wolfpack, was hit by a torpedo from the German submarine U-568.
- Stavka formally established the Kalinin Front under Ivan Konev.
- Born: Sarita Joshi, actress, in Pune, British India

== October 18, 1941 (Saturday) ==
- Hideki Tojo replaced Fumimaro Konoe as Prime Minister of Japan.
- The British destroyer HMS Broadwater escorting convoy SC 48 was sunk south of Iceland by the German submarine U-101.
- Soviet spy Richard Sorge was arrested in Tokyo for espionage.
- Died: Manuel Teixeira Gomes, 81, 7th President of Portugal

== October 19, 1941 (Sunday) ==
- Joseph Stalin proclaimed a state of siege in the capital and issued an Order of the Day that "Moscow will be defended to the last."
- German forces captured Mozhaysk.
- German submarine U-204 was depth charged and sunk by British warships in the Strait of Gibraltar.
- Died: Hector Cowan, 78, American football player and coach

== October 20, 1941 (Monday) ==
- German forces captured Borodino, 60 miles from Moscow.
- Mass murderer Stanley Graham was mortally wounded in a shootout with police near his farm. He died of his wounds the next morning.
- German submarine U-508 was commissioned.
- Born: Anneke Wills, actress, in Berkshire, England

== October 21, 1941 (Tuesday) ==
- Stalin appoints Zhukov the commander of all military forces in the Moscow area.
- The British gunboat HMS Gnat was torpedoed and damaged off Bardia by German submarine U-79. The Gnat would be towed and beached at Alexandria and be used as an anti-aircraft platform for the rest of the war.
- The Kragujevac massacre occurs in Yugoslavia, 2,778–2,794 people are killed by the German army.
- The comic book superhero Wonder Woman made her first appearance in All Star Comics issue #8 (cover date December 1941/January 1942).
- The comic book villain The Penguin made his first appearance in Detective Comics issue #58 (cover date December).
- German submarines U-163 and U-253 were commissioned.
- Born: Steve Cropper, guitarist, songwriter and record producer, in Dora, Missouri
- Died: Stanley Graham, 40, New Zealand mass murderer (died of wounds sustained in shootout with police)

== October 22, 1941 (Wednesday) ==
- The Odessa massacre began.
- 27 French hostages were shot outside Châteaubriant in reprisal for the killing of a German soldier in Nantes two days previously.
- The Royal Fleet Auxiliary oil tanker Darkdale was torpedoed and sunk at Jamestown, Saint Helena by the German submarine U-68.
- Tokyo conducted its first practice blackout.
- German submarine U-406 was commissioned.
- The three-act dramatic play Candle in the Wind premiered at the Shubert Theatre in New York City.
- Born: Wilbur Wood, baseball player, in Cambridge, Massachusetts
- Died: Guy Môquet, 17, French Communist militant (executed)

== October 23, 1941 (Thursday) ==
- The German government banned the emigration of Jews.
- The British destroyer HMS Cossack was torpedoed and damaged in the Atlantic Ocean by the German submarine U-563. The Cossack tried to return to Gibraltar for repairs but would sink in bad weather four days later.
- The first of the two Mesovouno massacres was carried out by the Wehrmacht in the Greek village of Mesovouno.
- German submarine U-593 was commissioned.
- The Walt Disney animated film Dumbo premiered at the Broadway Theatre in New York City.

== October 24, 1941 (Friday) ==
- The Germans captured Kharkov and Belgorod.
- The three-day Odessa massacre ended with some 25,000 to 34,000 Jews and 15,000 Romani murdered.
- The British cargo ships Alhama, Ariosto and Carsbreck were sunk 300 nautical miles west of Gibraltar by the German submarine U-564.

== October 25, 1941 (Saturday) ==
- The German drive on Moscow was almost completely halted due to bad weather.
- Riga Ghetto was established.
- President Roosevelt released a formal statement condemning reprisal executions carried out by the Nazis in occupied Europe. "The practice of executing scores of innocent hostages in reprisal for isolated attacks on Germans in countries temporarily under the Nazi heel revolts a world already inured to suffering brutality," the statement read.
- The British minelayer Latona was bombed and sunk by the Luftwaffe off Tobruk.
- German submarines U-117, U-171 and U-437 were commissioned.
- Born: Helen Reddy, singer and actress, in Melbourne, Australia (d. 2020); Anne Tyler, writer and literary critic, in Hennepin County, Minnesota
- Died: Robert Delaunay, 56, French artist (cancer)

== October 26, 1941 (Sunday) ==
- Mikhail Khozin took over the defense of Leningrad from Ivan Fedyuninsky, who was transferred to lead the Soviet 54th Army at Tikhvin.
- Armament officials told the American automobile industry that effective December 15, scarce materials such as chrome, nickel and aluminum could no longer be used for purely decorative aspects of cars.
- Died: Masha Bruskina, 17, Belarusian-Jewish resistance fighter (hanged); Arkady Gaidar, 37, Russian writer (killed in action on the Eastern Front); Victor Schertzinger, 53, American composer and filmmaker

== October 27, 1941 (Monday) ==
- Erich von Manstein's 11th Army broke into the Crimean Peninsula.
- The Germans captured Plavsk.
- President Roosevelt made an address on Navy Day declaring that "America has been attacked," referring to the Kearny incident ten days earlier. "I say that we do not propose to take this lying down. Our determination not to take it lying down has been expressed in the orders to the American Navy to shoot on sight. Those orders stand." The president also said that "when we have helped to end the curse of Hitlerism we shall help to establish a new peace which will give to decent people everywhere a better chance to live and prosper in security and in freedom and in faith. Each day that passes we are producing and providing more and more arms for the men who are fighting on actual battle-fronts. That is our primary task."
- Palestinian leader Amin al-Husseini arrived in Rome for talks with Fascist leaders.
- The British submarine HMS Tetrarch sent its last communication before being lost in the Mediterranean Sea, probably to a naval mine.
- F. Scott Fitzgerald's unfinished novel The Last Tycoon was posthumously published by Charles Scribner's Sons.
- The movie The Big Store starring the Marx Brothers, went on general release.
- Born: Gerd Brantenberg, author, teacher and feminist writer, in Oslo, Norway

== October 28, 1941 (Tuesday) ==
- German forces pierced the Soviet defensive line south of Tula.
- 20 former Soviet military officers and politicians are executed in Kuybyshev on the personal orders of Lavrentiy Beria.
- The John Ford-directed drama film How Green Was My Valley starring Walter Pidgeon and Maureen O'Hara was released.
- Born: John Hallam, actor, in Lisburn, Northern Ireland (d. 2006); Jochen Hasenmayer, speleologist and cave diver, in Pforzheim, Germany; Hank Marvin, guitarist for The Shadows, in Newcastle upon Tyne, England

== October 29, 1941 (Wednesday) ==
- The Kaunas massacre of Lithuanian Jews took place. 2,007 men, 2,920 women and 4,273 children were murdered by the SS in a single day.
- A German attempt to capture the city of Tula itself failed.
- The Germans took Volokolamsk northwest of Moscow, but expended many resources in the process and had to halt for resupply.
- German submarine U-355 was commissioned.
- The ASCAP boycott ended after almost ten months.
- The Cole Porter musical Let's Face It! had its Broadway premiere at the Imperial Theatre.
- Winston Churchill gave his famous "Never Give In" speech at Harrow School.
- Died: Alexander Afinogenov, 37, Russian playwright (killed in a German air raid); Harvey Hendrick, 43, American baseball player (suicide)

== October 30, 1941 (Thursday) ==
- The Siege of Sevastopol began.
- The Royal Air Force bombed the German naval supply base at Ålesund, Norway.
- Charles Lindbergh spoke to 20,000 people at an America First rally in Madison Square Garden. Lindbergh accused President Roosevelt of using "dictatorship and subterfuge" to draw the United States into the war.
- German submarines U-378 and U-594 were commissioned.
- Born: Theodor W. Hänsch, physicist and Nobel laureate, in Heidelberg, Germany

== October 31, 1941 (Friday) ==
- While escorting Allied convoy HX 156 in the North Atlantic, the American destroyer USS Reuben James was sunk by the German submarine U-552 with the loss of 115 of 159 crew.
- Nazi Germany announced heavy taxation increases for tobacco, spirits and champagne effective Monday. State Secretary of the Finance Ministry Fritz Reinhardt claimed that the primary aim of the new taxes was to reduce consumption.
- Born: Sally Kirkland, actress, in New York City (d. 2025)
- Died: Herwarth Walden, 62, German artist and art expert
