= Kokatahi =

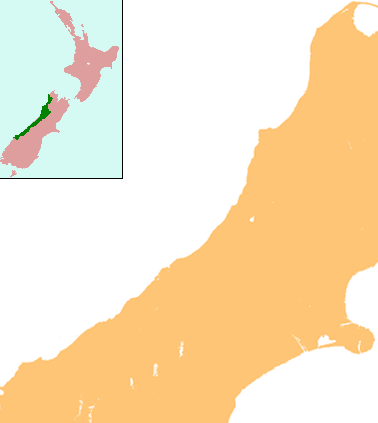
- Location within West Coast
- Coordinates: 42°49′58″S 171°2′0″E
- Country: New Zealand
- Region: West Coast
- District: Westland District
- Electorates: West Coast-Tasman; Te Tai Tonga
- Time zone: UTC+12 (NZST)
  - Summer (DST): UTC+13 (NZDT)
- Postcode: 7881
- Area code: 03
- Local iwi: Ngāi Tahu

Kokatahi is a locality on the West Coast of New Zealand. Hokitika is about 15 kilometres (9.3 miles) to the north-west. The Kokatahi River flows through the area and into the Hokitika River to the north-west.

Farming in the area started in the late 1860s to produce oats and vegetables to feed the gold rush miners and their horses. Dairy farming makes up a large percentage of the farms in and around Kokatahi. In 1900–1901, a dairy factory opened at Kokatahi.

Flooding of the Hokitika River has affected Kakatahi-Kowhitirangi in 1913, 1924, 1939, 1941, 1949, 1958, 1967, 1968, 1978, 1979, 1988, 1999 and 2010. Many of these floods cut off the area from Hokitika.

== Demographics ==
Kokatahi locality covers 170.64 km^{2} (65.88 sq mi). It is part of the larger Hokitika Valley-Otira statistical area.

Historical population
Year	Pop.	±% p.a.
2006	243	—
2013	240	−0.18%
2018	273	+2.61%
2023	258	−1.12%

Kokatahi had a population of 258 in the 2023 New Zealand census, a decrease of 15 people (−5.5%) since the 2018 census, and an increase of 18 people (7.5%) since the 2013 census. There were 135 males and 123 females in 108 dwellings. There were 45 people (17.4%) aged under 15 years, 27 (10.5%) aged 15 to 29, 132 (51.2%) aged 30 to 64, and 54 (20.9%) aged 65 or older.

People could identify as more than one ethnicity. The results were 86.0% European (Pākehā), 10.5% Māori, 2.3% Pasifika, 3.5% Asian, and 16.3% other, which includes people giving their ethnicity as "New Zealander". English was spoken by 98.8%, Māori by 3.5%, and other languages by 4.7%. No language could be spoken by 1.2% (e.g. too young to talk). The percentage of people born overseas was 12.8, compared with 28.8% nationally.

Religious affiliations were 34.9% Christian, 1.2% New Age, and 1.2% other religions. People who answered that they had no religion were 51.2%, and 12.8% of people did not answer the census question.

Of those at least 15 years old, 36 (16.9%) people had a bachelor's or higher degree, 129 (60.6%) had a post-high school certificate or diploma, and 51 (23.9%) people exclusively held high school qualifications. 12 people (5.6%) earned over $100,000 compared to 12.1% nationally. The employment status of those at least 15 was 111 (52.1%) full-time, 30 (14.1%) part-time, and 3 (1.4%) unemployed.

== Education ==
Kokatahi-Kowhitirangi School is a coeducational contributing primary (years 1–6) school with a roll of 37 as of July 2026.

A school district was established at Kokatahi in 1880. Upper Kokotahi School opened later that year. Lower Kokotahi School closed in 1881 due to the poor condition of its building, but was open again by the beginning of 1882. The Upper Kokotahi schoolhouse was replaced in 1882. It moved to Bladier Road in 1907, and closed in 1929 with the students transferring to Lower Kokotahi School.

Callaghans School was open by 1876 and Koiterangi School by 1889. In 1924 Calleghans School moved to Upper Koiterangi. Koiterangi was renamed Kowhitirangi in the 1950s. Kowhitirangi School closed in 2000.

== Police shootings ==
On 4 October 1941, Stanley Graham went on a shooting rampage after a neighbour of Graham's, Anker Madsen, complained to Constable Edward Best, stationed in nearby Kaniere, that Graham was accusing him of poisoning his cattle. Best decided not to respond in order to give Graham time to calm himself.

Best later returned with additional policeman and tried to disarm Graham. In the process Graham then shot and killed four policeman.

Graham was later shot dead on 17 October 1941 after a massive police manhunt led by Commissioner of Police Denis Cummings.
