= Lake Kaniere =

Glacial lake located on the West Coast of New Zealand's South Island

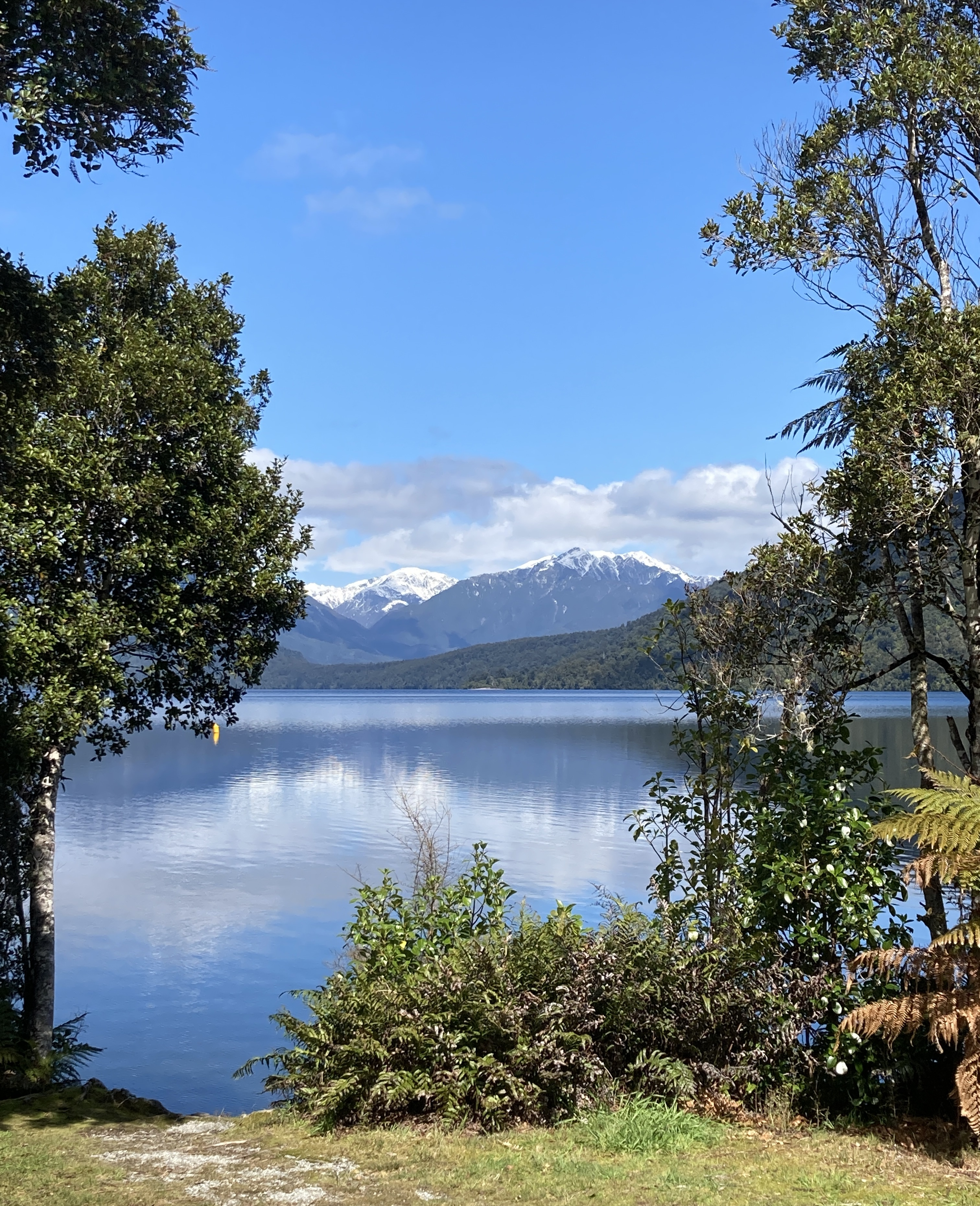
- Lake Kaniere

- Location within New Zealand Location within South Island
- Interactive map of Lake Kaniere
- Location: Westland District, West Coast Region, South Island
- Coordinates: 42°50′S 171°09′E
- Primary outflows: Kaniere River
- Basin countries: New Zealand
- Max. length: 8 km (5.0 mi)
- Max. width: 2 km (1.2 mi)
- Surface area: 15 km^{2} (5.8 sq mi)
- Max. depth: 195 m (640 ft)

Lake Kaniere is a glacial lake located on the West Coast of New Zealand's South Island. Nearly 200 metres (660 ft) deep, the lake is surrounded on three sides by mountains and mature rimu forest. It is regarded by many as the most beautiful of the West Coast lakes, and is a popular tourist and leisure destination.

== Geography ==
Lake Kaniere lies 19 kilometres (12 mi) southeast of Hokitika, between two mountain ranges. At about 15 km^{2} (5.8 sq mi), it is second only to Lake Brunner in size among the West Coast's lakes. It is oriented north–south, 8 km long and 2 km wide, and has a maximum depth of 195 m. Mount Graham and Mount Upright / Te Taumata o Uekanuku are on the west coast of the lake, Tūhua on the east. The lake is included in the 7,000-hectare (17,000-acre) Lake Kaniere Scenic Reserve.

The road from Hokitika meets the northern shore of the lake at "The Landing" and splits; Dorothy Falls Road runs up the entire eastern side of the lake past Hans Bay and Dorothy Falls to the Styx River, while the other fork goes a short way west to Sunny Bight. A four-hour hiking trail continues down the west side of the lake before joining Dorothy Falls Road. Most of the houses at Lake Kaniere today are holiday homes, and there is a DOC campground at Hans Bay.

== Geology ==
Lake Kaniere was created by the action of glaciers in the last ice age 14,000 years ago, like many West Coast lakes. It currently drains into the Tasman Sea at its northern end via the Kaniere River, but in the past its outlet was at the southern end, emptying into the Styx River. This exit was blocked by a landslide, diverting the water north.

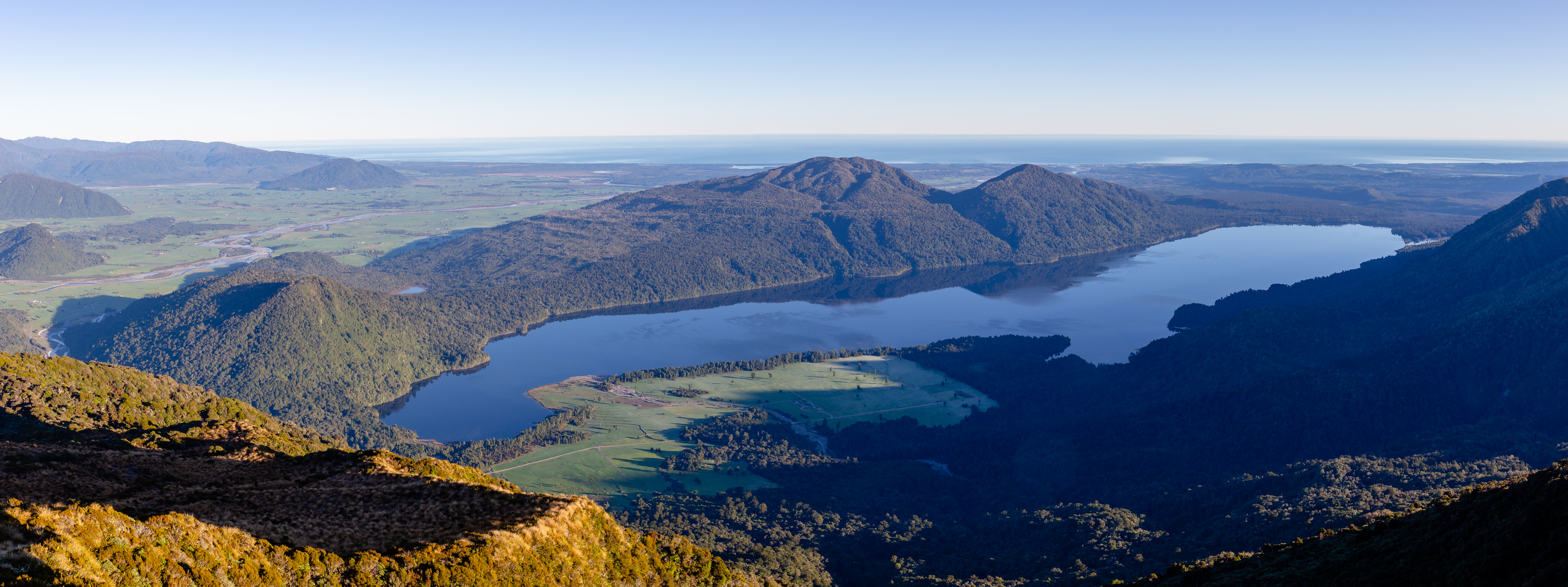
Lake Kaniere looking northwest from Mt Brown. The three main peaks on the west shore from left to right are Mt Upright / Te Taumata o Uekanuku (524 m), Mt Graham (829 m), and Conical Hill (764 m). The slopes of Tūhua (1125 m) can be seen to the right.

== Fauna ==
The streams that feed into the lake are home to several species of native fish, including common bullies, longfin eels, banded kōkopu and giant kōkopu. The lake has been stocked with fish in the past, and mostly contains brown trout and perch.

Many species of native birds can also be found on and around the lake, such as little shags, black shags, New Zealand scaup, paradise shelducks and pūkeko, and also, rarely, grey ducks. There are several pairs of whio in the Styx River at the southern end of the lake. In the surrounding forest are yellow-crowned kākāriki, ruru, rifleman, brown creeper, and sometimes kea.

Early Māori settlers found large numbers of kākāpō around the lake.

== Flora ==
Lake Kaniere Scenic Reserve is largely composed of mature rimu, and is considered one of the most ecologically significant areas of lowland forest in the central West Coast. The rimu forest composition varies: on the flat outwash terraces, it contains rātā (Metrosideros) and kaikawaka (Libocedrus bidwillii), while on the slopes there is more supplejack (Ripogonum scandens), kiekie (Freycinetia banksii), and miro (Pectinopitys ferruginea). In the swampier areas there are other tree species, including manoao (Manoao colensoi), kaikawaka, and kahikatea (Dacrycarpus dacrydioides).

== Human history ==
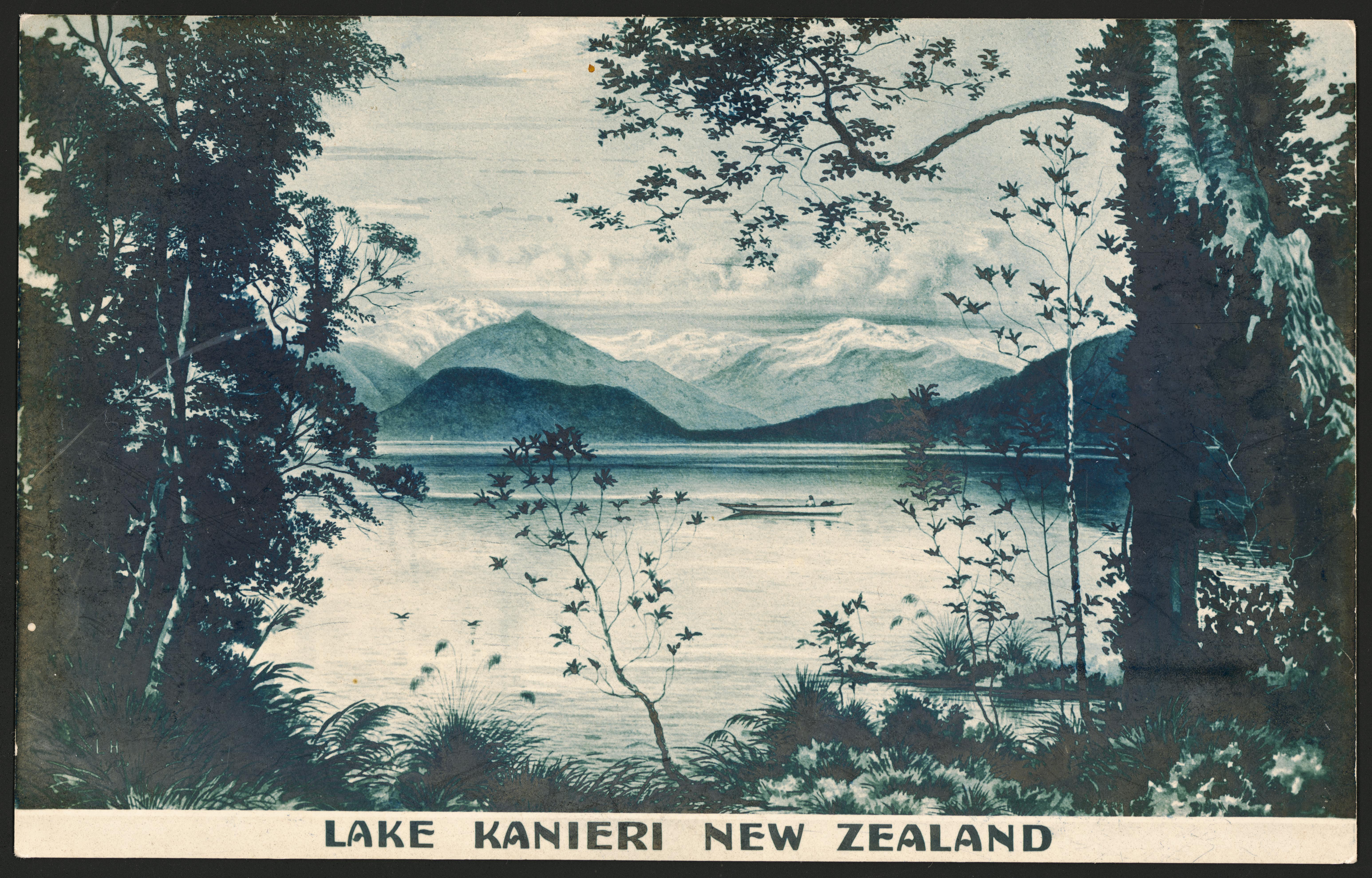
1910 tourism postcard of the lake

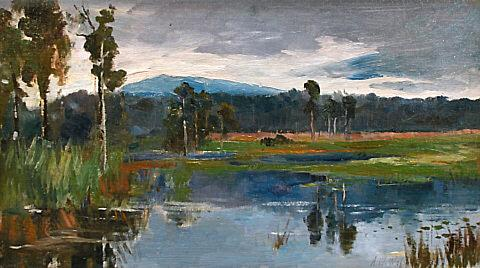
Painting by Alfred Walsh (1859–1916)

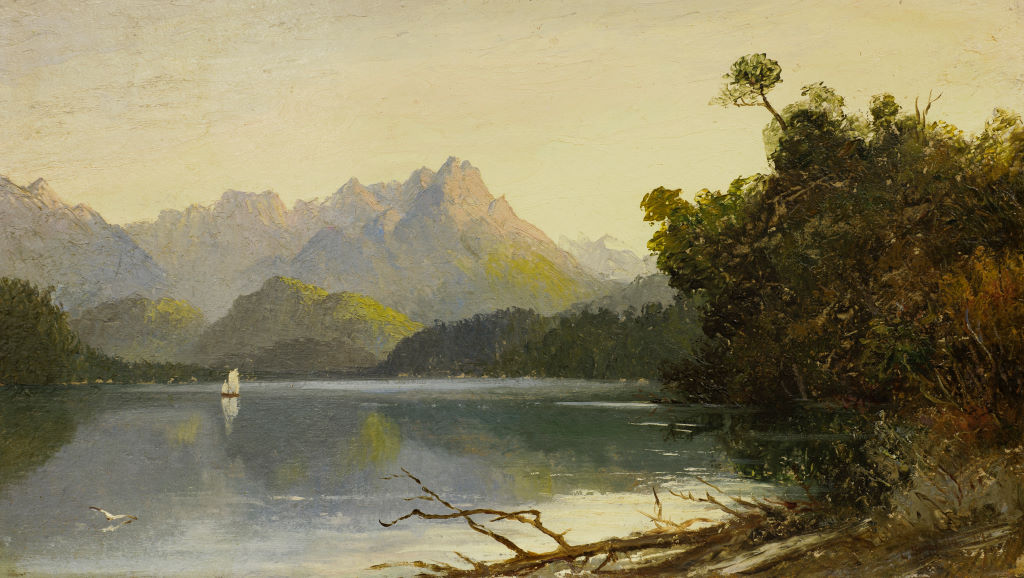
Painting by Charles Blomfield (1848–1926)

In pre-European times, Lake Kaniere was an important mahinga kai (food gathering place) for Māori, with longfin eels and weka being two of the most important food resources in and around the lake.

In 1909, a small hydroelectric station was built on the Kaniere River, at a cost of £15,000, to power the pumping equipment at the Ross gold mine. Water is taken near the weir at the northern end of the lake and travels 9 km through a series of tunnels and flumes to a twin power plant capable of generating 520 kW; the water race was originally used for gold sluicing in the Kaniere area. The most prominent of the wooden flumes, Johnson's Flume, collapsed in 1973 and was replaced by earthworks. The Kaniere Forks power station later supplied the gold dredge at Rimu, and after 1931 exclusively generated power for Hokitika, today supplying 3.75 GWh annually to the town. A 3½ hour walkway follows the water race, part of the West Coast Wilderness Trail.

Lake Kaniere is a popular location for leisure activities such as camping, picknicking, jetboating, jetskiing, and water skiing. It is occasionally used by naturists for nude swimming; New Zealand has no official nude beaches, as public nudity is legal on any beach where it is "known to occur". It is also the main water supply for Hokitika.
