= H. A. Willis =

Australian writer (born 1948)

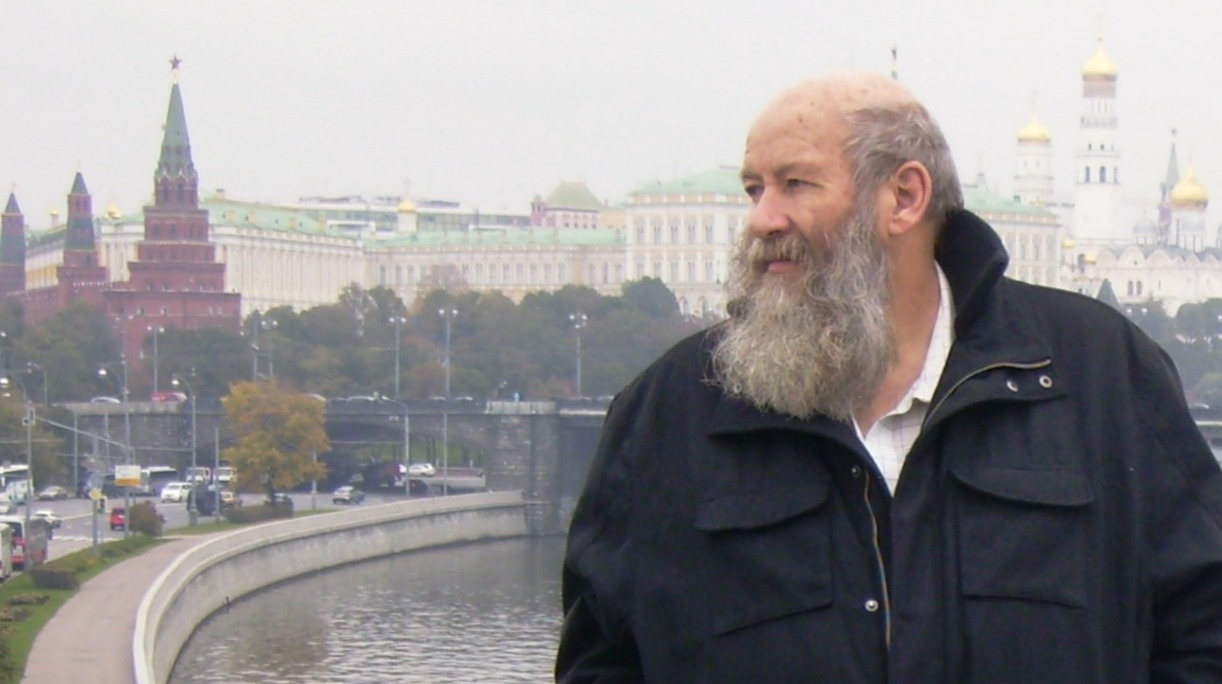
- Willis in 2013
- Born: Howard Alan Willis; 15 November 1948 (age 78); Colac, Victoria, Australia
- Occupations: Essayist; novelist; critic; editor
- Children: 2
- Writing career
- Period: 1967–
- Notable works: Manhunt: The Story of Stanley Graham (non-fiction book; basis of the feature film Bad Blood)

Howard Alan Willis (born 15 November 1948), is an Australian essayist, novelist, critic and editor.

== Early life, education and family ==
The son of a Lands Department inspector in Victoria, Willis was born at Colac and grew up at Apollo Bay, Kyneton and Ballarat.

As a student at La Trobe University in the late 1960s, Willis was part of a group (which also included Philippe Mora, Peter Beilby, Rod Bishop and Demos Krouskos), that wrote and produced the first issue of Cinema Papers (October 1967).

Willis subsequently lived in Darwin, followed by Auckland, New Zealand (1970–1980). While studying at the University of Auckland, Willis was a founding member of Alternative Cinema, an Auckland film-makers’ cooperative established in 1972. He contributed articles to and edited several early issues of that group’s journal, Alternative Cinema. Willis later (1976) wrote an in-depth account of the New Zealand film industry for Cinema Papers.

Returning to Australia, Willis lived in rural Tasmania. In late 1981, he settled, with his wife and two young sons in Perth, Western Australia. One of these children died in 1998.

== Career ==
While living in New Zealand, Willis produced a half-hour television documentary, Stanley, filmed in October–November 1974 for the NZBC. The film concerned the 12-day manhunt (in October 1941) for Stanley Graham, after a mass shooting at Kowhitirangi. Based on his interviews with witnesses, including participants in the manhunt, and his access to the previously closed police files, Willis wrote Manhunt, the most detailed and definitive account of the event. A feature film based on his book, Bad Blood (1981), was directed by Mike Newell and featured actors Jack Thompson and Carol Burns (as Stan and Dorothy Graham). In 2012, Willis returned to Kowhitirangi and Hokitika, where Graham is buried. His account of his trip to Westland and the Graham story was published in the "Travel" section of The West Australian. Willis's 2012 visit to New Zealand also generated articles paying homage to the earthquake damaged city of Christchurch and the philosopher Karl Popper (a resident of Christchurch in 1937–45).

After settling in Western Australia, Willis worked as an archival researcher, film script assessor (WA Film Council, 1991–93), book editor and reviewer. Between 1989 and 2006, he wrote about 250 reviews for The West Australian, The Age and The Canberra Times. He also wrote a number of longer articles on subjects that included the closure of the old Metters Limited stove factory in Perth, chronic pain, east European cultural and political history, cultural stereotyping, and environmental issues. In an essay on Colonial frontier violence he identified and reproduced the first known photograph (1865) taken in the Kimberley region. His essay on pain was selected as the Western Australian finalist for the MBF Health and Well Being awards for 1994. In 1994 he interviewed Tim Winton for Eureka Street; Winton later dedicated his novel Breath (2008) to Willis.

Willis has been involved in two aspects of the Australian "history wars". When Keith Windschuttle published The Fabrication of Aboriginal History, Volume One (2002), Willis undertook a detailed analysis of the author's cited sources to dispute his figure for Aboriginal Tasmanians killed during hostilities in Van Diemen's Land. In relation to that debate, Robert Manne described Willis as "a conservative scholar ... known for his scrupulousness". In 2010, he joined the debate over the introduction and history of smallpox in Australia, arguing that the origin of the 1789 outbreak near Sydney was most likely from a Macassan introduction through Northern Australia.

As a non-fiction editor, Willis prepared for publication (including the title) The Last of the Last (2009), the autobiography of Claude Choules, the last combat veteran of World War I. At the time of publication Choules was 108, making him the world’s oldest first time author. Other titles edited by Willis include From Kastellorizo (2006), Michael (Stratos) Jack Kailis’s memoir of his extended family, and Nurses with Altitude (2008), a collection of stories by Western Australian nurses of the Royal Flying Doctor Service.

Between 1982 and 1991, Willis published 11 short stories in various literary journals, including Overland, Australian Short Stories, Brave New Word, Going Down Swinging, The Weekend Australian, and Island Magazine.

In 2010, Willis indexed and was one of the editorial annotators of The Australind Journals of Marshall Waller Clifton 1840–1861. In 2011, he wrote an introductory essay to a reprinted edition of Thermo-Electrical Cooking Made Easy, by Nora Curle-Smith, first published in Kalgoorlie in 1907, and claimed to be the world’s first cookbook for an electric stove.

In 2006, Willis was diagnosed with hepatitis C, which he believes was contracted by either a blood transfusion or a catheter in a Perth hospital in the mid-1980s. After two unsuccessful attempts to treat the disease, he was cleared of the virus in 2019. He wrote about having what was, at the time, an incurable disease in his debut novel, What Comrade Oldie Knew (2021).

A second novel, Playing with Mischief, set in rural Victoria (Ballarat and Kyneton) in the early 1960s, was self-published at the end of July 2021.
