= Kaniere River =

River in New Zealand

Coordinates: 42°45′S 171°01′E

Location
- Country: New Zealand

Physical characteristics
- Source
  - location: Lake Kaniere
- Mouth
  - location: Hokitika River
- Length: 15 km (9.3 mi)

The Kaniere River is a river of New Zealand. It is located in the West Coast Region of the South Island. The river is the outflow of Lake Kaniere, and flows west to reach the Hokitika River five kilometres from the coast of the Tasman Sea.

== See also ==
- List of rivers of New Zealand
