= Upper Woodstock =

Upper Woodstock may refer to:

- Rimu, New Zealand
- Upper Woodstock, Tasmania
