= Hokitika & Kanieri Tramway =

Coordinates: 42.727489°S 170.984722°E

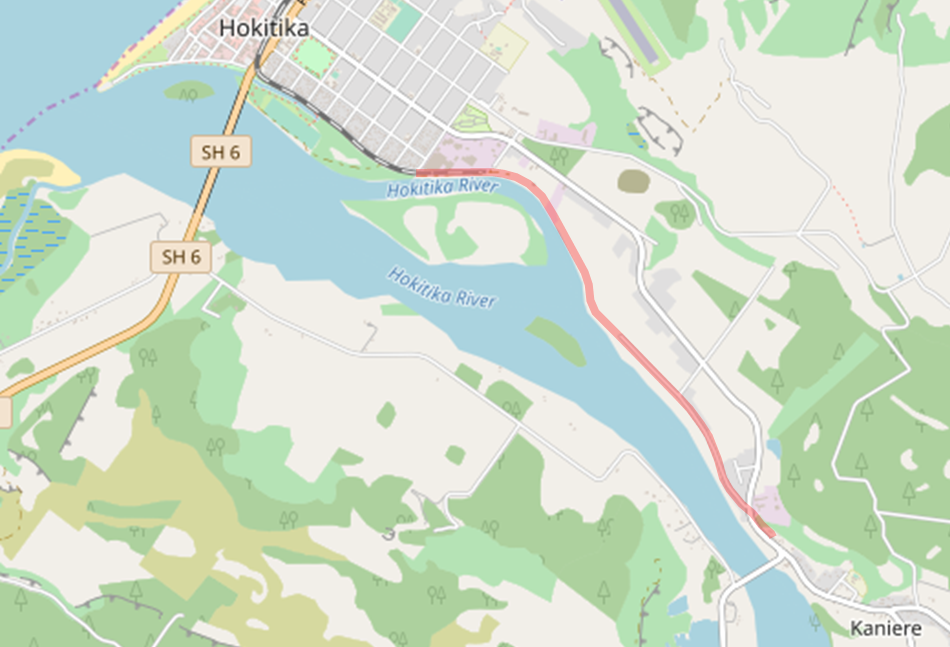

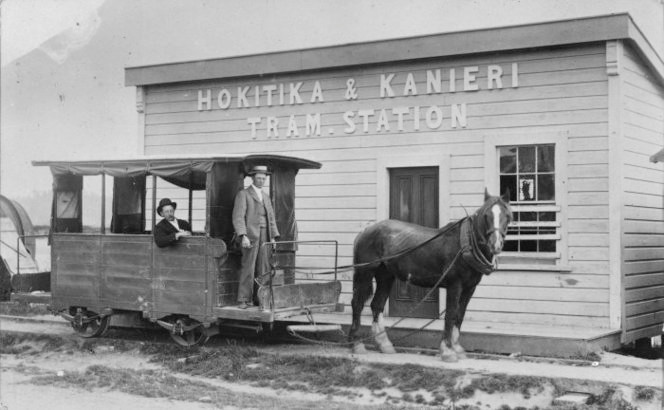
- Horse-drawn tram at Hokitika & Kanieri Tram Station

Technical
- Line length: 3.5 kilometres (2 mi)
- Track gauge: 3 ft 6 in (1,067 mm)

The Hokitika & Kanieri Tramway was an 3.5 kilometres (2 mi) long, privately owned tramway with a gauge of 3 ft 6 in (1,067 mm) between Hokitika and Kaniere in the Westland District on the West Coast of the South Island, New Zealand, which operated from 1866 to 1914 as a horse-drawn tram and from the 1920s to 1950s as a logging railway.

== History ==
=== Construction ===
In 1866, the Hokitika & Kanieri Tramway Company built a tram with wooden rails from the Hokitika jetty to the Hotel Terminus in Kanieri. In November 1866, the tenders for the construction of the route were published, and then the track was laid in sections.

== Operation as a tram ==
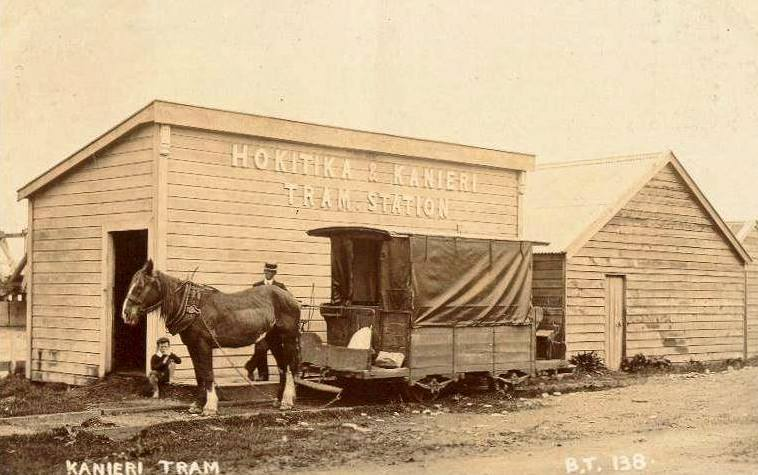
Horse tram at Hokitika & Kanieri Tram Station

The first tramway advert was published in the West Coast Times in May 1867 offering five round trips on working days and six on Sundays. The tram company leased its operation soon after completion to Smith & Co. These resigned from the lease in April 1874, whereupon the tram company had difficulty finding a new tenant, with nobody being interested by February 1875. In late 1876, the company decided to cease operations and offered for sale the tram line, all rail vehicles and the 17-acre lot between the tram line and the Kantiere Road. John Mc Fadyen bought the full package and ran the tram until 1885, when he was declared bankrupt.

=== Change of ownership ===
John Maher, a contractor from Hokitika, then bought the tram line and leased its operation to Richard Heyward. In 1886 Heyward published a tender for route maintenance work. Heyward only ran the route for a year. In 1887, Mr. O'Malley took over the lease. He seems to have operated the tram until 1896, when Michael Meyer, probably a relative of John Maher, took over as owner.

Michael Meyer left New Zealand in 1897 and sold the tram line and associated buildings. At this time there were two tram halls, one at Gibson Quay and one in Kaniere, a station building at the terminus in Hokitika, as well as horses, harnesses and other materials and plants.

The tram was acquired by Owen McGuigan, who was later joined by his son Thomas. McGuigan built a more spacious station at the Hokitika terminus upstream of the bridge over the Hokitika River, but this was demolished as early as 1909. The McGuigans continued to operate the tram until 1914, when the passenger operation was finally terminated.

== Operation as a logging railway ==
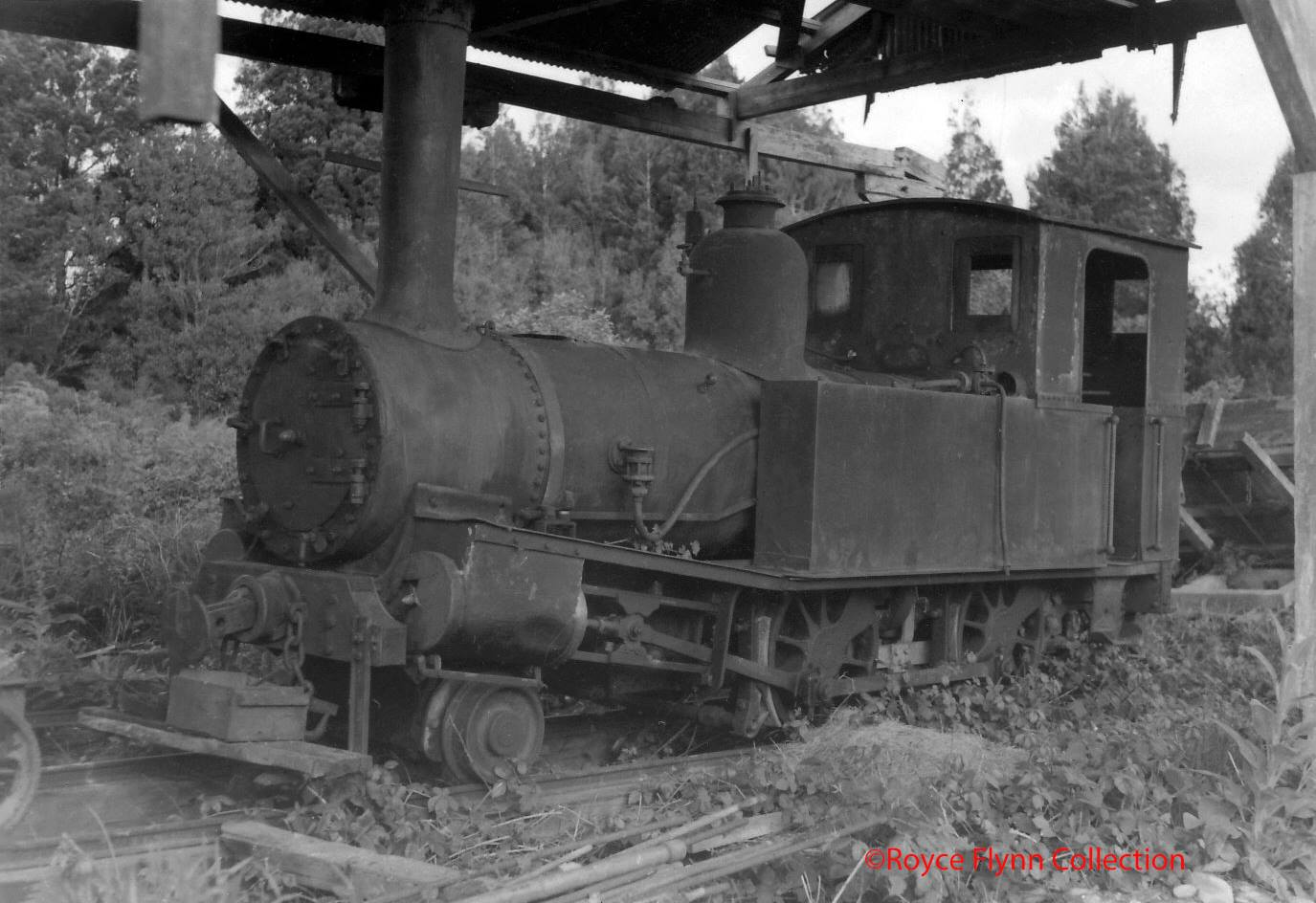
Steam locomotive D 144 at Hokitika, 1955

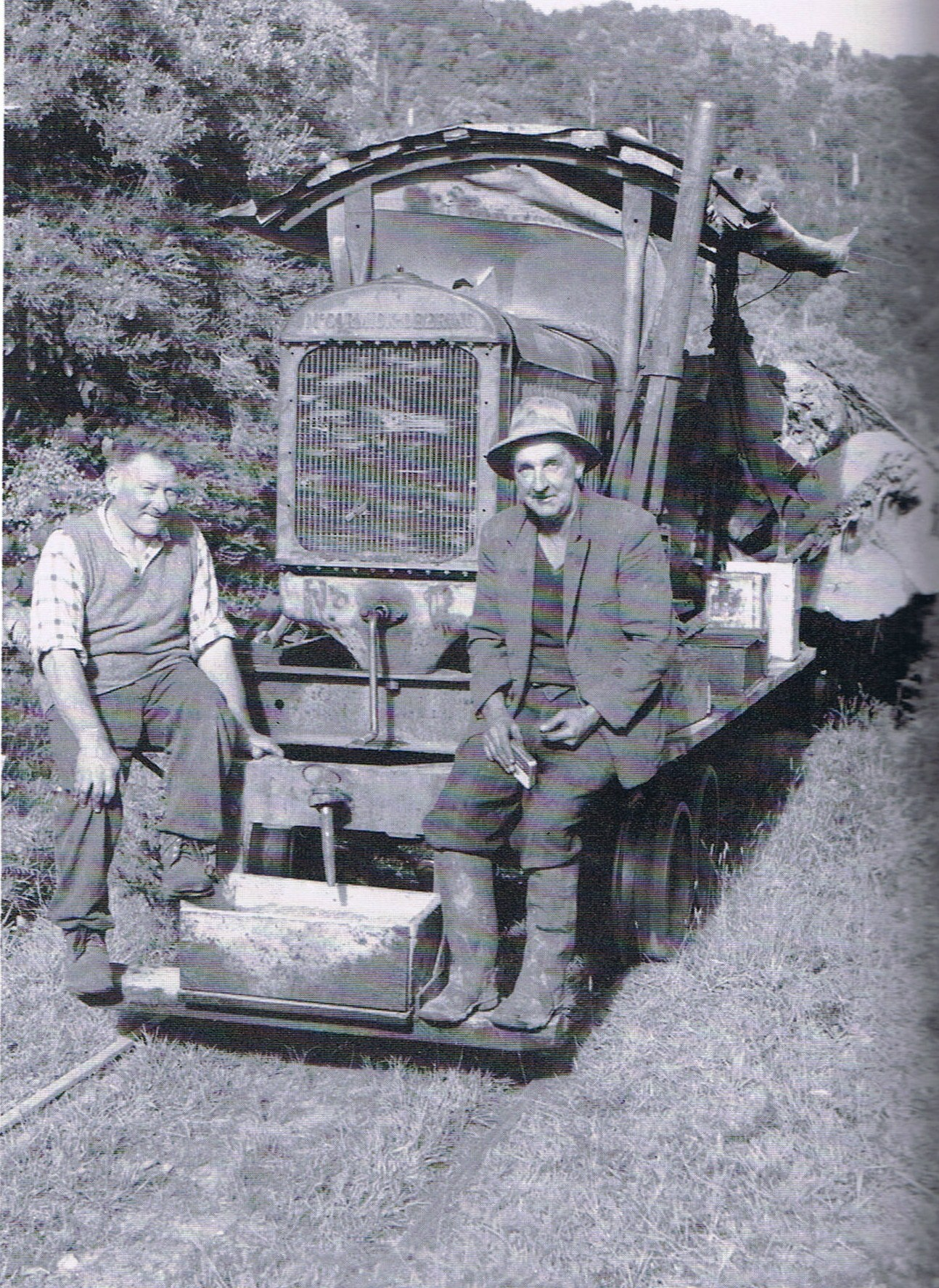
Logging locomotive of Stuart & Chapman

The route remained out of use until the 1920s, when the Kaniere Hokitika sawmill was built on the site of today's Christian church on Kaniere Road. This sawmill was later owned by Stuart & Chapman. The sawmill owners renovated the track to transport logs from the bush to Hokitika and built logging railroad branches that linked their sawmill with the Kaniere forestry operations at McKay Creek.

A second-hand NZR D class steam locomotive was used on the tramway by the Kanieri-Hokitika Sawmilling Co. 1928–1951.

A Barclay steam locmomitive with works No 1299 of 1912 was used from 1924 to approximately 1950 by the Kanieri Hokitika Timber Co. It was an 'Improved Meyer' design with a 0-4-4-0T wheel arrangement and a weight of 24 tons originally used on the May Morn Estates Tramway. It proved quite satisfactory. The frame of the locomotive was last seen at Kaniere about 1973. A Johnston 16 wheeler and Price Cb locomotives also worked the Kaniere Hokitika Sawmills Ltd tramway. The Price Cb was reputedly destroyed in a runaway in the early 1950s.

A petrol or petrol/TVO driven 10/20 or 15/30 sled unit operated around 1962.

The tramway was used to transport logs to the Stuart & Chapman sawmill, until it was replaced by road transport in the 1950s. It continued to transport sawn timber by rail to the railway station of Hokitika, until the sawmill was destroyed by fire on 8 May 1966, 100 years after the construction of the first tram.

== Today's use ==
Part of the route is still in service as a siding along the Gibson Quay of Westland Milk Products. On the remainder of the right-of-way a cycleway/walkway was created.
