= November 1941 =

Month of 1941

<<	November 1941					>>
Su	Mo	Tu	We	Th	Fr	Sa
						1
2	3	4	5	6	7	8
9	10	11	12	13	14	15
16	17	18	19	20	21	22
23	24	25	26	27	28	29
30

The following events occurred in November 1941:

== November 1, 1941 (Saturday) ==
- A formal statement from Adolf Hitler claimed that the United States "has attacked Germany" and that Roosevelt had been placed before the "tribunal" for world judgment. Germany disputed the American account of the sinking of the Reuben James and claimed that a German submarine only attacked after American destroyers attacked German submarines first.
- German troops occupied Simferopol on the Crimean peninsula.
- Jews in Slovakia were required to travel in separate train compartments and send and receive letters marked with the Star of David.
- The Rainbow Bridge across the Niagara River opened to traffic, connecting the United States and Canada.
- German submarine U-214 was commissioned.

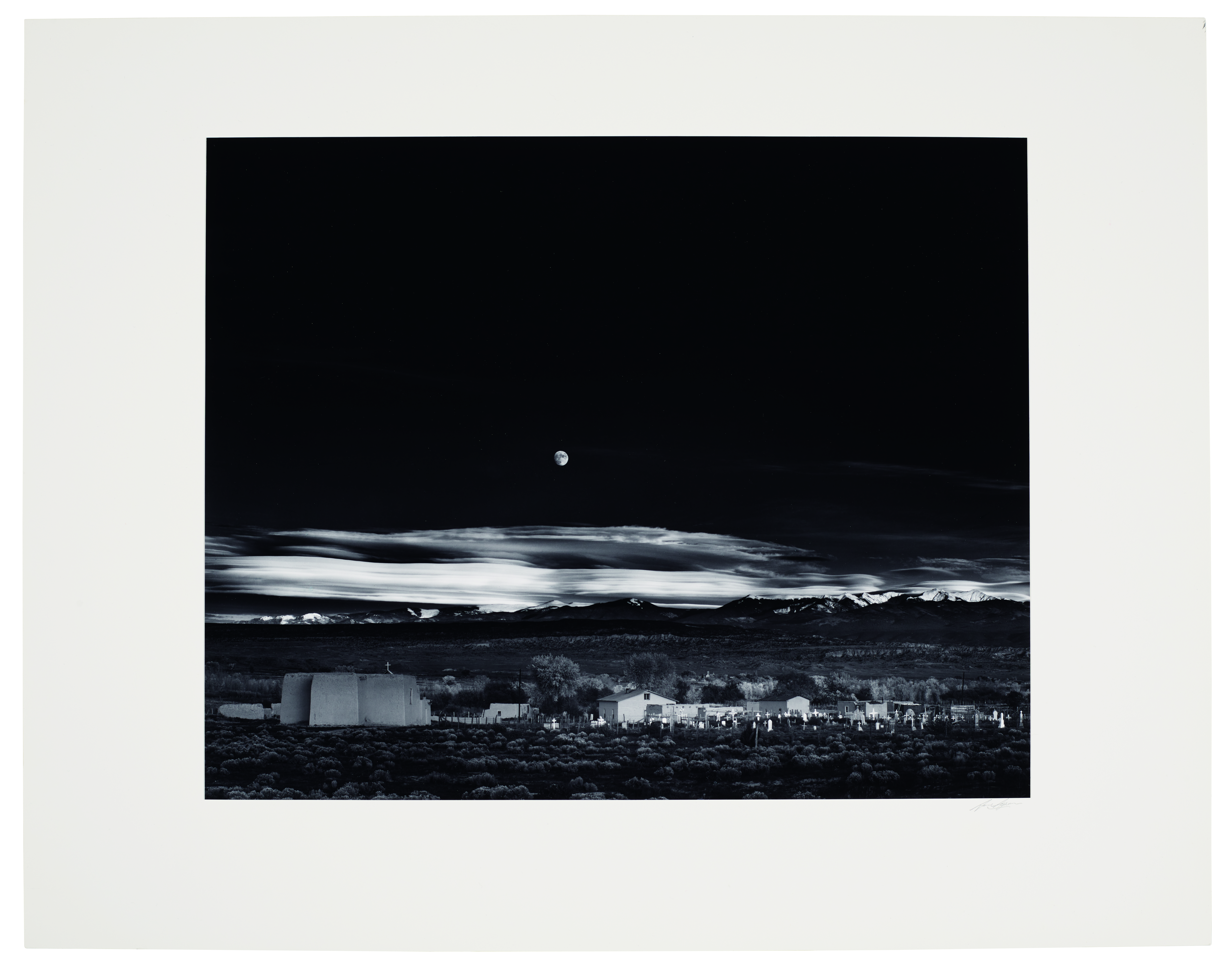
November 1, 1941: Moonrise, Hernandez, New Mexico

- Ansel Adams took the photograph Moonrise, Hernandez, New Mexico.
- Born: Marina Baura, actress, in Galicia, Spain; Nigel Dempster, journalist and author, in Calcutta, British India (d. 2007); Robert Foxworth, actor, in Houston, Texas

== November 2, 1941 (Sunday) ==
- The Finnish conquest of East Karelia was completed when the Soviets withdrew from Kondopoga.
- The Soviet cruiser Voroshilov was bombed in harbour by the Luftwaffe at Novorossiysk and put out of action until February 1942.
- A Vichy French convoy of freighters and passenger ships was captured north of Madagascar by British cruisers.
- Born: Bruce Welch, guitarist, producer and member of The Shadows, in Bognor Regis, Sussex, England

== November 3, 1941 (Monday) ==
- The Germans captured Kursk.
- The British merchant ship Flynderborg was sunk off Newfoundland by German submarine U-202.
- German submarine U-755 was commissioned.
- Died: Samuel Murray, 72, American sculptor and educator

== November 4, 1941 (Tuesday) ==
- The Germans captured Feodosia on the Crimean Peninsula.
- The British battleship HMS Duke of York was commissioned.
- Fiorello H. La Guardia was re-elected to a third term as Mayor of New York City.
- Viscount Halifax was pelted with eggs and tomatoes by isolationist women demonstrators in Detroit as he was leaving City Hall. Halifax was afterwards quoted as saying, "How fortunate you Americans are, in Britain we get only one egg a week and we are glad of those." The quote was actually fabricated by someone in the British Press Service, but it was widely disseminated in the media and created a burst of sympathy and goodwill towards the British and Halifax in particular.
- Dolph Camilli of the Brooklyn Dodgers was named the National League's Most Valuable Player.
- German submarine U-509 was commissioned.

== November 5, 1941 (Wednesday) ==
- Isoroku Yamamoto issued Top Secret Order No. 1 to the Japanese Combined Fleet, detailing the plan for the attack on Pearl Harbor.
- The Soviet submarine ShCh-324 was lost in the Baltic Sea off Tallinn, presumably to a naval mine.
- The Noël Coward play Blithe Spirit made its Broadway debut at the Morosco Theatre.
- German submarines U-172 and U-457 were commissioned.
- Born: Art Garfunkel, musician and actor, in Queens, New York

== November 6, 1941 (Thursday) ==
- Joseph Stalin made a radio address broadcast worldwide declaring that Hitler's "crazy plan" to draw Britain and the United States into a coalition to destroy the Soviet Union had failed. Stalin said that a coalition of the United States, Britain and the USSR was "now a reality" and expressed his hopes that a "second front" would be established "in the near future."
- Between 15,000 and 18,000 Jews were taken to the Sosenki forest outside of Rovno and massacred over the next two days.
- Frostbite began to appear among German troops on the Eastern Front.
- German submarine U-595 was commissioned.
- Born: Doug Sahm, musician and founder of the Sir Douglas Quintet, in San Antonio, Texas (d. 1999)

== November 7, 1941 (Friday) ==
- The Soviet hospital ship Armenia was sunk by German bombers while evacuating civilians and wounded soldiers from Crimea. As many as 7,000 people were killed in the sinking, making it one of the worst maritime disasters in history.
- In an important symbolic event, Soviet troops marched in Red Square to commemorate the anniversary of the October Revolution as per the annual tradition. Soldiers taking part in the parade marched straight on to the front line.
- The United States Senate voted 50 to 37 to amend the Neutrality Act to allow merchantmen to be armed and permit U.S. ships to enter combat zones.
- The cargo ship MV Nottingham was sunk in the Atlantic Ocean by German submarine U-74.
- Senior commanders of the Japanese Army and Navy were informed that the start of war against Britain and the United States was tentatively set for December 8 (Japanese time).
- Bette Davis became the first female president of the Academy of Motion Picture Arts and Sciences.
- Born: Angelo Scola, cardinal, in Malgrate, Italy
- Died: Albin Zollinger, 46, Swiss writer

== November 8, 1941 (Saturday) ==
- In conjunction with the creation of the Lwów Ghetto, 5,000 of the city's Jews were executed.
- The Germans captured Tikhvin.
- The Battle of the Duisburg Convoy was fought over the night of November 8/9, ending in British victory.
- The Communist Party of Albania (renamed the Party of Labour of Albania in 1948) was founded.
- German submarine U-254 was commissioned.

== November 9, 1941 (Sunday) ==
- The Germans occupied the Crimean city of Yalta.
- A referendum on the policies of Ion Antonescu was held in Romania. The vote was recorded as 99.99% in favour.
- Born: Tom Fogerty, musician and rhythm guitarist for Creedence Clearwater Revival, in Berkeley, California (d. 1990)

== November 10, 1941 (Monday) ==
- The British launched Operation Flipper, a commando raid on the headquarters of Erwin Rommel.
- The German 50th Infantry Division under the command of Erich von Manstein launched a major assault against Sevastopol.
- Elements of Admiral Chūichi Nagumo's Pearl Harbor strike force began departing Kure naval base.
- Winston Churchill declared that although he would view "with keen sorrow" the opening of a conflict between Japan and the English-speaking world, "should the United States become involved in war with Japan the British declaration will follow within the hour."

== November 11, 1941 (Tuesday) ==
- A general election was held in the Philippines. Incumbent President Manuel L. Quezon won an unprecedented second term.
- German submarine U-580 sank in the Baltic Sea after a collision with the target ship Angelburg.
- President Roosevelt gave an Armistice Day address at Arlington National Cemetery. "Our observance of this Anniversary has a particular significance in the year 1941," the president said. "For we are able today as we were not always able in the past to measure our indebtedness to those who died ... Whatever we knew or thought we knew a few years or months ago, we know now that the danger of brutality and tyranny and slavery to freedom-loving peoples can be real and terrible. We know why these men fought to keep our freedom - and why the wars that save a people's liberties are wars worth fighting and worth winning - and at any price."
- The Australian War Memorial was opened in Canberra.
- Joe DiMaggio of the New York Yankees was named the American League's Most Valuable Player. DiMaggio's 56-game hitting streak beat out Ted Williams' .406 batting average, 291 points to 254.
- Died: Charles Huntziger, 61, French army general (plane crash)

== November 12, 1941 (Wednesday) ==
- The Soviet 52nd Army counterattacked at Volkhov.
- King George VI opened a new session of British Parliament. "The developments of the past year have strengthened the resolution of my peoples and of my allies to prosecute this war against aggression until final victory," his speech from the throne began.
- British Commandos executed Operation Astrakan, an overnight raid on Houlgate in France.

== November 13, 1941 (Thursday) ==
- The British aircraft carrier Ark Royal was torpedoed and severely damaged off Gibraltar by the German submarine U-81.
- The Soviet cruiser Chervona Ukraina was sunk at Sevastopol by German aircraft.
- U.S. Congress voted 212 to 194 to abolish combat zones, thereby allowing U.S. ships to carry goods directly to ports of belligerent countries.
- German submarine U-596 was commissioned.
- Born: Mel Stottlemyre, baseball player and coach, in Hazleton, Missouri (d. 2019)

== November 14, 1941 (Friday) ==
- Despite efforts to salvage the Ark Royal, she had to be abandoned to sink some 12 hours after having been torpedoed.
- The British cargo ship Empire Defender was torpedoed and sunk south of the Galite Islands, Tunisia by Italian aircraft.
- The Alfred Hitchcock-directed romantic psychological thriller film Suspicion starring Cary Grant and Joan Fontaine was released.
- Died: Paraskev Stoyanov, 70, Bulgarian-Romanian surgeon, anarchist and professor

== November 15, 1941 (Saturday) ==
- The Germans renewed the drive on Moscow after a three-week lull. The Soviets were pushed back from the Volga Reservoir north of the capital but with temperatures dropping to -20 Celsius across the Eastern Front, the German advance was very slow.
- German submarine U-583 sank in the Baltic Sea with no survivors after a collision with U-153.
- German submarines U-173 and U-459 were commissioned.

== November 16, 1941 (Sunday) ==
- The German 11th Army captured Kerch on the far eastern end of the Crimean Peninsula.
- German submarine U-433 was depth charged and sunk in the Mediterranean Sea south of Málaga by the British corvette HMS Marigold.
- Died: Miina Härma, 77, Estonian composer

== November 17, 1941 (Monday) ==
- Operation Silver Fox ended in a Soviet defensive victory.
- Operation Arctic Fox ended in a stalemate.
- Born: Tova Traesnaes, businesswoman, in Oslo, Norway (d. 2022)
- Died: Ernst Udet, 45, German World War I flying ace and Luftwaffe general (suicide)

== November 18, 1941 (Tuesday) ==
- The British Eighth Army began Operation Crusader, once again trying to lift the Siege of Tobruk.
- Operation Flipper ended in British failure.
- Mexico broke off diplomatic relations with Bulgaria, Hungary and Romania.
- German submarine U-704 was commissioned.
- A stage adaptation of the Sally Benson semi-autobiographical story collection Junior Miss opened at the Lyceum Theatre on Broadway.
- Born: David Hemmings, actor, in Guildford, Surrey, England (d. 2003)
- Died: Émile Nelligan, 61, Canadian poet; Walther Nernst, 77, German physicist and Nobel laureate; Chris Watson, 74, 3rd Prime Minister of Australia

== November 19, 1941 (Wednesday) ==
- The battle between HMAS Sydney and German auxiliary cruiser Kormoran occurred off the coast of Western Australia. The Sydney was sunk and the Kormoran had to be scuttled due to heavy damage.
- Advanced British units captured Sidi Rezegh 10 miles south of Tobruk.
- The retirement of Sir John Dill as Chief of the General Staff (United Kingdom) was announced. Sir Alan Brooke was designated to succeed him.
- German submarines U-89 and U-408 were commissioned.

== November 20, 1941 (Thursday) ==
- Palestinian leader Amin al-Husseini met with German Foreign Minister Joachim von Ribbentrop in Berlin.
- The German Afrika Korps gave battle over a broad area around Sidi Rezegh.
- Talks opened in Washington, D.C. between U.S. Secretary of State Cordell Hull, Japanese ambassador Kichisaburō Nomura and special Japanese envoy Saburō Kurusu. The Japanese demanded that the Americans withdraw from China, lift all sanctions directed against Japan and halt the U.S. naval buildup in the Pacific.
- The British cargo ship Empire Dorado collided with the Greek cargo ship Theomitor in the Atlantic Ocean. Empire Dorado was taken in tow by a Royal Navy ship but sank two days later.
- German submarine U-597 was commissioned.
- Died: Kurt von Briesen, 55, German general (killed by Soviet aircraft near Izium)

== November 21, 1941 (Friday) ==
- The Battle of Rostov began on the Eastern Front.
- General Alan Cunningham ordered the British 70th Division to break out of its encirclement at Tobruk, which it managed to do after a hard day's fighting.
- Born: Juliet Mills, actress, in London, England

== November 22, 1941 (Saturday) ==
- In the Battle of Moscow, the Germans captured Klin.
- The 2nd New Zealand Division captured Fort Capuzzo.
- The German auxiliary cruiser Atlantis was shelled and sunk off Ascension Island by the heavy cruiser HMS Devonshire.
- British Commandos carried out Operation Sunstar, an overnight raid on Houlgate, France.
- German submarines U-215 and U-438 were commissioned.
- Born: Jacques Laperrière, ice hockey player and coach, in Béarn, Quebec, Canada
- Died: Werner Mölders, 28, German fighter ace (plane crash); Kurt Koffka, 55, German psychologist

== November 23, 1941 (Sunday) ==
- The British 7th Armoured Division was forced to withdraw south of Sidi Rezegh after getting outflanked by Axis troops.
- A bomb exploded at the U.S. consolate in Saigon, causing considerable damage but no injuries.
- Born: Derek Mahon, poet, in Belfast, Northern Ireland (d. 2020)
- Died: Henrietta Vinton Davis, 81, American actress and elocutionist

== November 24, 1941 (Monday) ==
- Gerd von Rundstedt disregarded a direct order from Hitler and withdrew from Rostov-on-Don due to Soviet counter-attacks in the rear.
- The British light cruiser HMS Dunedin was torpedoed and sunk off Recife, Brazil by German submarine U-124.
- The Italian passenger ferry Hercules was torpedoed and sunk in Heraklion harbour by the British submarine Triumph.
- The U.S. Supreme Court decided Edwards v. California.
- The comic strip Gordo by Mexican-American cartoonist Gus Arriola first appeared.
- Born: Pete Best, original drummer for The Beatles, in Madras, British India; Donald "Duck" Dunn, bass guitarist, songwriter and producer, in Memphis, Tennessee (d. 2012)

== November 25, 1941 (Tuesday) ==
- The British battleship HMS Barham was torpedoed and sunk off Alexandria by German submarine U-331 with the loss of more than 800 crew.
- The 17th Panzer Division reached Kashira.
- The 7th Indian Brigade repulsed an attack by the German 5th Panzer Regiment at Sidi Omar, Libya. Meanwhile, Australian and New Zealand troops linked up at El Duda.
- The Anti-Comintern Pact was renewed, with Finland, Romania, Bulgaria, Denmark, Nanjing China, Slovakia, and Croatia joining as new signatories.
- Jerónimo Méndez became acting President of Chile upon the death of Pedro Aguirre Cerda.
- The first mass shooting of the Ninth Fort massacres took place near Kaunas, Lithuania.
- German submarine U-510 was commissioned.
- Born: Ralph Haben, politician, in Atlanta, Georgia; Riaz Ahmed Gohar Shahi, spiritual leader, in Dhok Gohar Shah, British India
- Died: Pedro Aguirre Cerda, 62, President of Chile

== November 26, 1941 (Wednesday) ==
- The Germans withdrew from Sidi Rezegh, allowing the British 7th Armoured Division to retake the town.
- Chūichi Nagumo's aircraft carrier strike force headed for Pearl Harbor with the understanding that should "negotiations with the United States reach a successful conclusion, the task force will immediately put about and return to the homeland."
- Cordell Hull offered a counter-proposal to the Japanese demands, requiring Japan to recognize Chiang Kai-shek, withdraw from both China and French Indochina and to agree to a multinational non-aggression pact. The Japanese asked for two weeks to study the proposals.
- Neil Ritchie replaced Alan Cunningham as commander of the British Eighth Army.
- Lebanon was proclaimed independent by Georges Catroux, the Chief of Free French forces in the Levant. Allied countries would recognize this independence, although in practice Lebanon was still governed under French authority.
- German submarine U-174 was commissioned.
- Born: G. Alan Marlatt, psychologist, in Vancouver, British Columbia, Canada (d. 2011)

== November 27, 1941 (Thursday) ==
- The Siege of Tobruk ended in Allied victory when the besieged garrison was relieved by the British 8th Army.
- The 15th Panzer Division captured Sidi Azeiz, Libya and took 700 prisoners.
- The Battle of Rostov ended in Soviet victory.
- American Admiral Husband E. Kimmel and Lieutenant General Walter Short were sent warning messages advising that negotiations with Japan had reached a stalemate and that Japan might take hostile action at any moment. The Philippines, the Kra Peninsula and Borneo were listed as among the potential sites of a Japanese attack, but Hawaii was not.
- The Australian sloop Parramatta was torpedoed and sunk off Tobruk by German submarine U-559.
- German submarine U-598 was commissioned.
- The Japanese news agency Dōmei Tsushin said that "there is little hope of bridging the gap between the opinions of Japan and the United States."
- Born: Eddie Rabbitt, singer and songwriter, in Brooklyn, New York (d. 1998)

== November 28, 1941 (Friday) ==
- German officer Johann von Ravenstein was captured at Point 175 by New Zealand soldiers.
- The Soviets retook Rostov-on-Don.
- Palestinian leader Amin al-Husseini met with Hitler in Berlin. The two pledged mutual support in their common cause.
- German submarine U-95 was sunk in the Mediterranean Sea east of Gibraltar by the Dutch submarine O-21.
- German submarine U-164 was commissioned.
- The service comedy film Keep 'Em Flying starring Abbott and Costello was released.
- Born: Laura Antonelli, actress, in Pola, Istria, Italy (d. 2015)

== November 29, 1941 (Saturday) ==
- Operation Uzice ended in the retreat of the Yugoslav Partisans and Chetniks and the breakup of the short-lived Republic of Užice.
- German troops withdrew from Taganrog on the Sea of Azov.
- The Italian Ariete Division overran the New Zealand 21st Battalion at Point 175.
- The second mass shooting of the Ninth Fort massacres occurred. A total of 4,934 German Jews were killed in the two days of shootings.
- German submarines U-255 and U-379 was commissioned.
- The Army–Navy Game was played at Philadelphia Municipal Stadium before 98,497 spectators. Navy defeated Army 14-6.
- "Chattanooga Choo Choo" by Glenn Miller and His Orchestra hit #1 on the Billboard singles charts.
- Bruce Smith of the University of Minnesota won the Heisman Trophy.
- The Winnipeg Blue Bombers edged the Ottawa Rough Riders 18-16 to win the 29th Grey Cup of Canadian football.
- Born: Bill Freehan, baseball player, in Detroit, Michigan (d. 2021)
- Died: Zoya Kosmodemyanskaya, 18, Soviet partisan and posthumous recipient of the Hero of the Soviet Union award (hanged by the Germans)

== November 30, 1941 (Sunday) ==
- Gerd von Rundstedt approved a German retreat to the Mius River following the defeat at Rostov.
- Axis forces attacked again at Sidi Rezegh, battering the New Zealand 24th and 26th Battalions as the Germans launched a new drive on Tobruk.
- The first day of the Rumbula massacre occurred near Riga, Latvia. A total of about 25,000 Jews were killed on this day and December 8.
- German submarine U-206 was lost in the Bay of Biscay on or around this date, probably to a naval mine.
- The romantic comedy film Two-Faced Woman starring Greta Garbo (in her final role) and Melvyn Douglas was released.
- Died: Esmond Romilly, 23, British socialist (shot down over the North Sea)
