= May Morn Estates Tramway =

Early Twentieth Century train service in New Zealand

Coordinates: 41.079695°S 175.143594°E

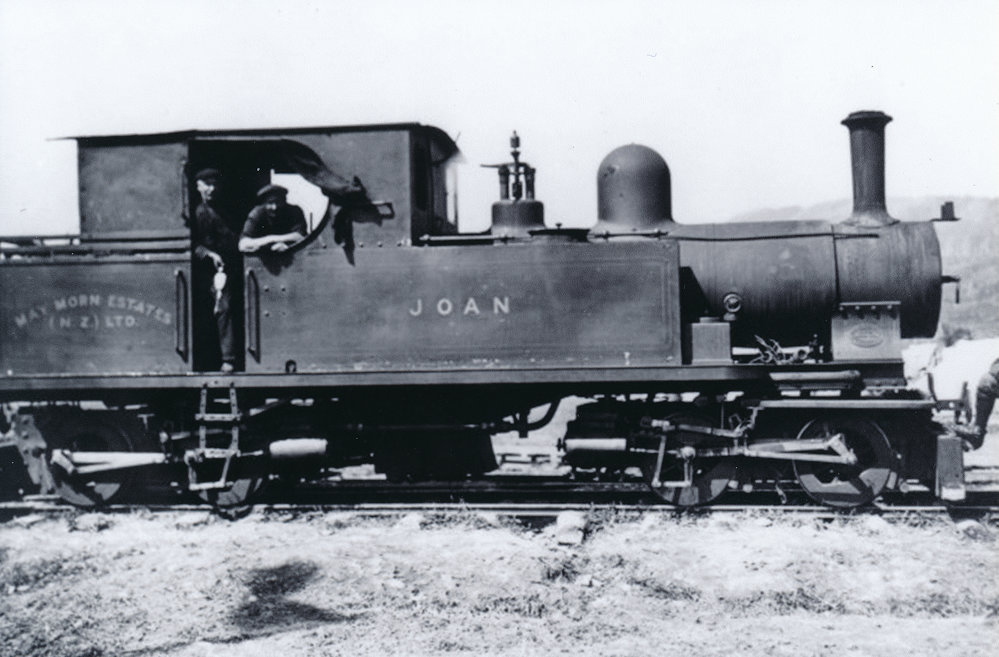
- Barclay 0-4-4-0T steam locomotive 'Joan'

Technical
- Track gauge: 3 ft 6 in (1,067 mm)

The May Morn Estates Tramway was a bush tramway at Mangaroa, which crossed the Hutt River at Te Mārua near Upper Hutt on New Zealand's North Island. The company was incorporated in 1912 and operated their saw mill at least from 1914 to 1915.

== History ==
The tramway with a track gauge of 3 ft 6 in (1,067 mm) ran from a large saw mill at the end of what is now MacLaren Street in Mangaroa into the Akatarawa Forest crossing the Hutt River at Te Mārua. The bridge was destroyed by floods in 1939.

May Morn Estates (NZ) Ltd was a London company of investors. They intended to mill the Akatarawa Forest, convert the land to pastoral use and build a township. There was even a long-term plan to extend the tramway to the North Island Main Trunk Railway at Otaki. The mill operated for only about a year from 1914 to 1915. It was closed on 5 August 1915, after the outbreak of World War I, by which operating funds could not be sent from London to New Zealand. The gullible investors thus lost all their investment (approx NZD $15M or USD $10M in 2017 money).

From 1913 the public began to worry about the deforestation and the silting of the Hutt River. It was desired to bring the May Morn Estate into public ownership. In 1940 the Minister of Scenery Protection and Commissioner of State Forests commented negatively about Tudor Atkinson, a lawyer who had been involved in setting up the May Morn scheme. The Minister had "scoundrelly, thieving concerns" and said that the government would not help out people who "dig their own graves". As late as 1950 Arthur Seed, the General Manager of the mill, was still trying to sell the land at an acceptable price. His price expectation was based on logging, but public officials believed that the land was only suitable for preservation purposes.

== Locomotive ==
The locomotive was built in 1912 by Andrew Barclay Sons & Co. of Kilmarnock, Scotland as Class BB. It was an 'Improved Meyer' design with a 0-4-4-0T wheel arrangement and of 3 ft 6 in (1,067 mm) gauge. The maker's No was 1299. 'Joan' was despatched from the builder on 22 October 1912 and had four 7 by 12 inches (180 mm × 300 mm) cylinders and eight 27 inches (690 mm) diameter wheels. It had a weight of 24 tons in working order and operated at a boiler pressure of 180 pounds per square inch (12 bar).

After the sawmill was closed down, the locomotive was temporarily used for shunting in freezing works and later at a gravel quarry. Finally, she was used from 1924 on the Kaniere-Hokitika Sawmilling Company's bush tramway, where she proved quite satisfactory. The frame of the locomotive was last seen at Kanieri about 1973.

== Trestle bridges ==
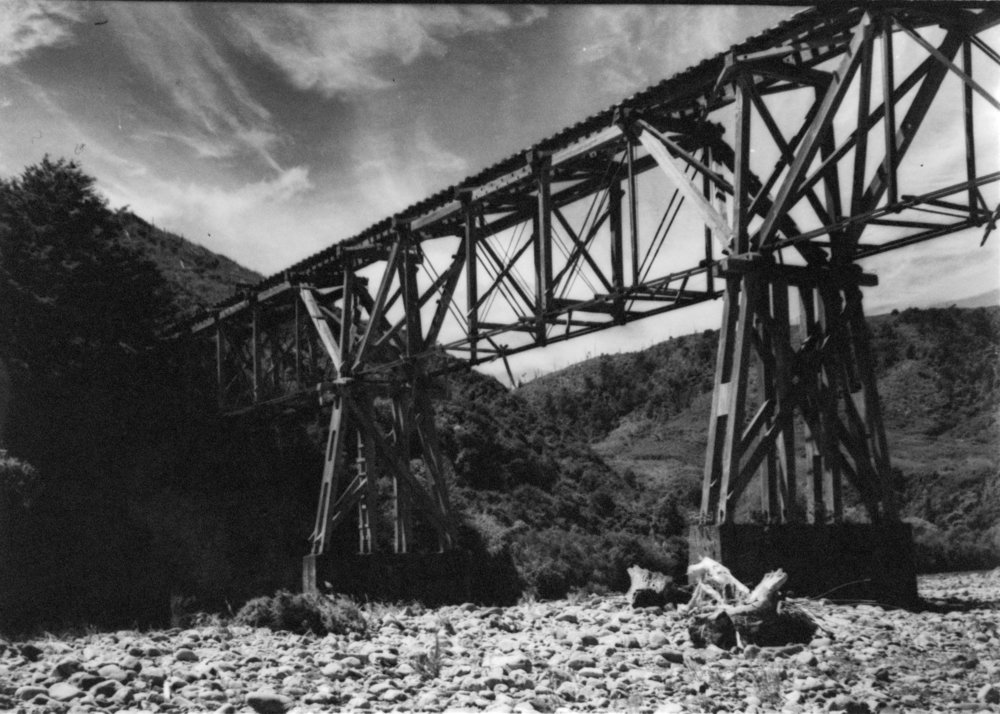
Bush tramway bridge with two piers crossing the Hutt River at Te Mārua

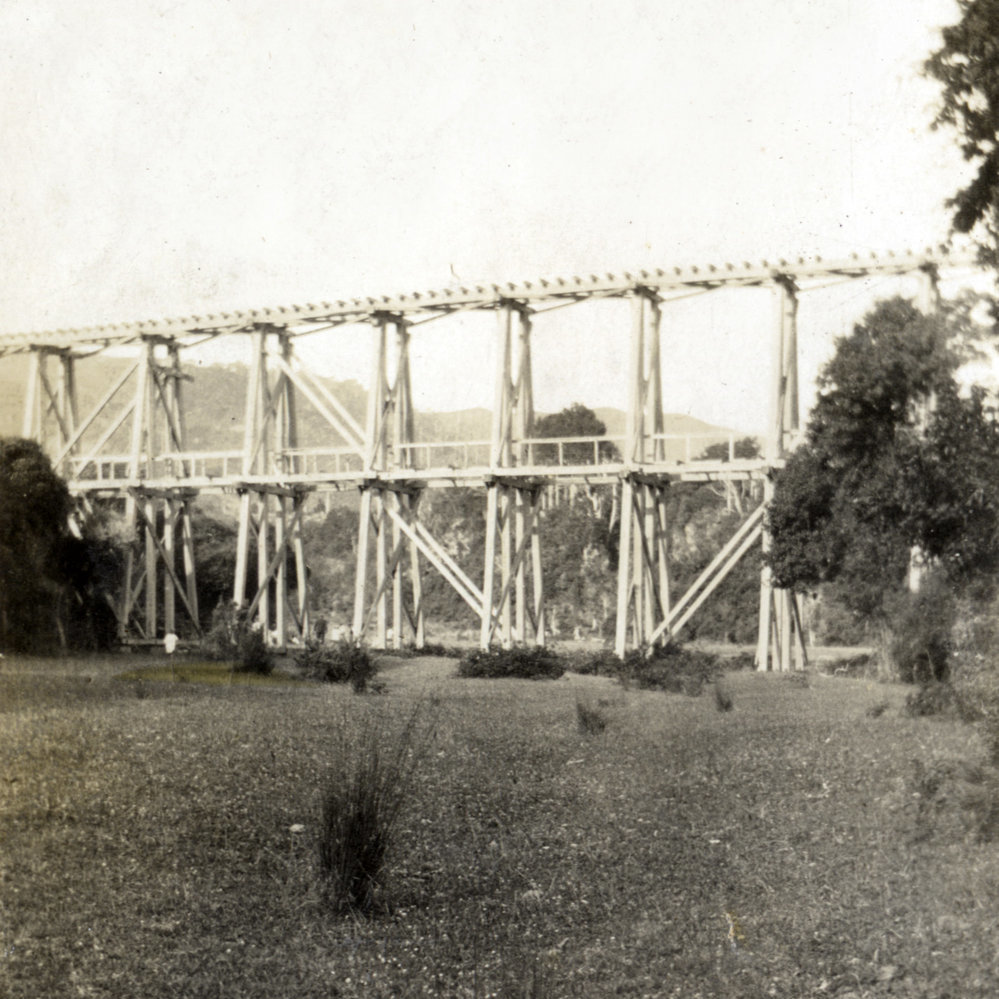
Bush tramway bridge with eight piers beside the Hutt River at Te Mārua
