= Styx River (West Coast) =

River in New Zealand

Coordinates: 42.883088°S 171.110006°E

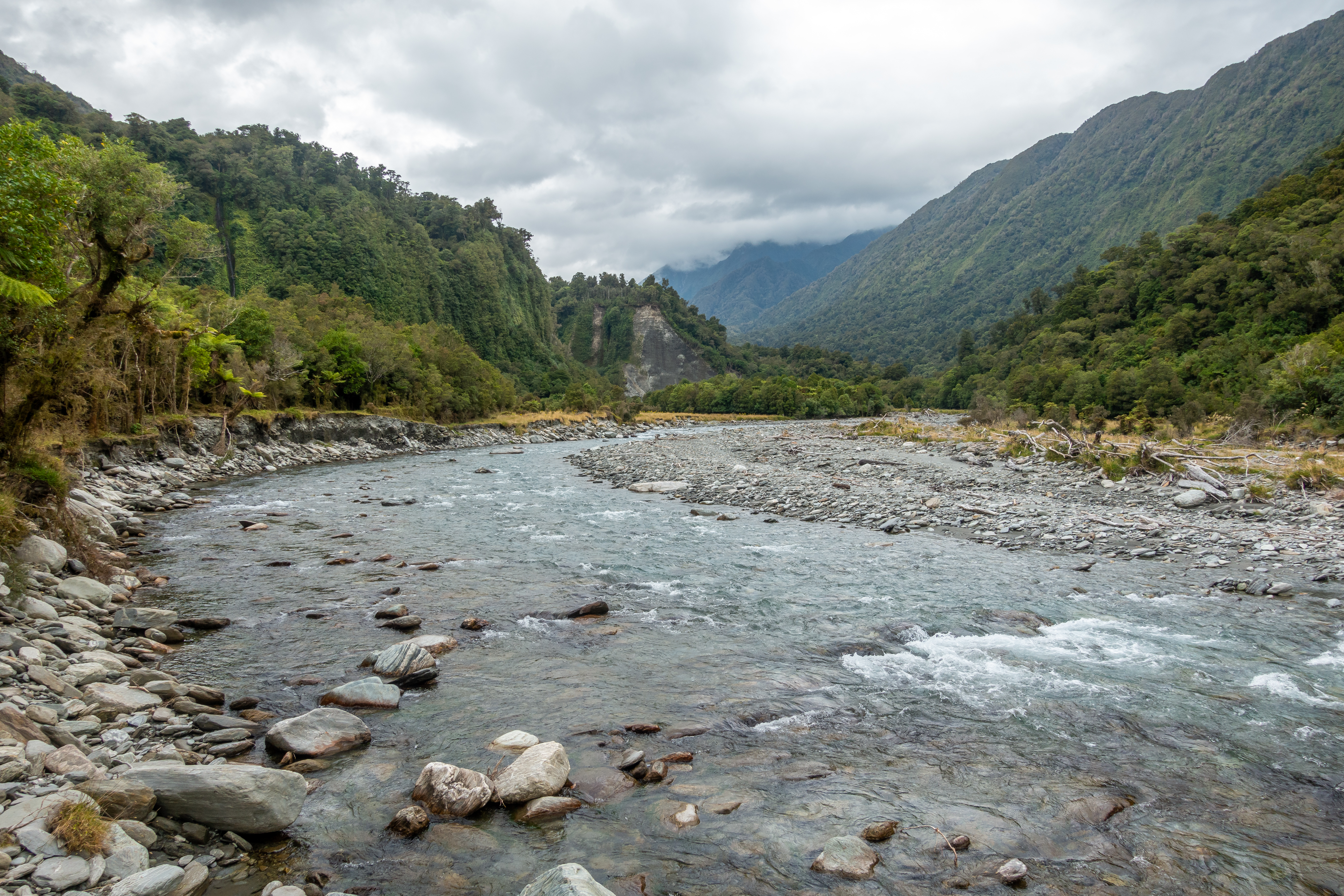

Location
- Country: New Zealand

Physical characteristics
- Mouth
  - location: Kokatahi River
- Length: 16 km (9.9 mi)

The Styx River is a river of the West Coast Region of New Zealand. It flows west for 16 km from Styx Saddle into the Kokatahi River, through native bush for the majority of its length.
