= Mount Graham (New Zealand) =

Mountain in New Zealand

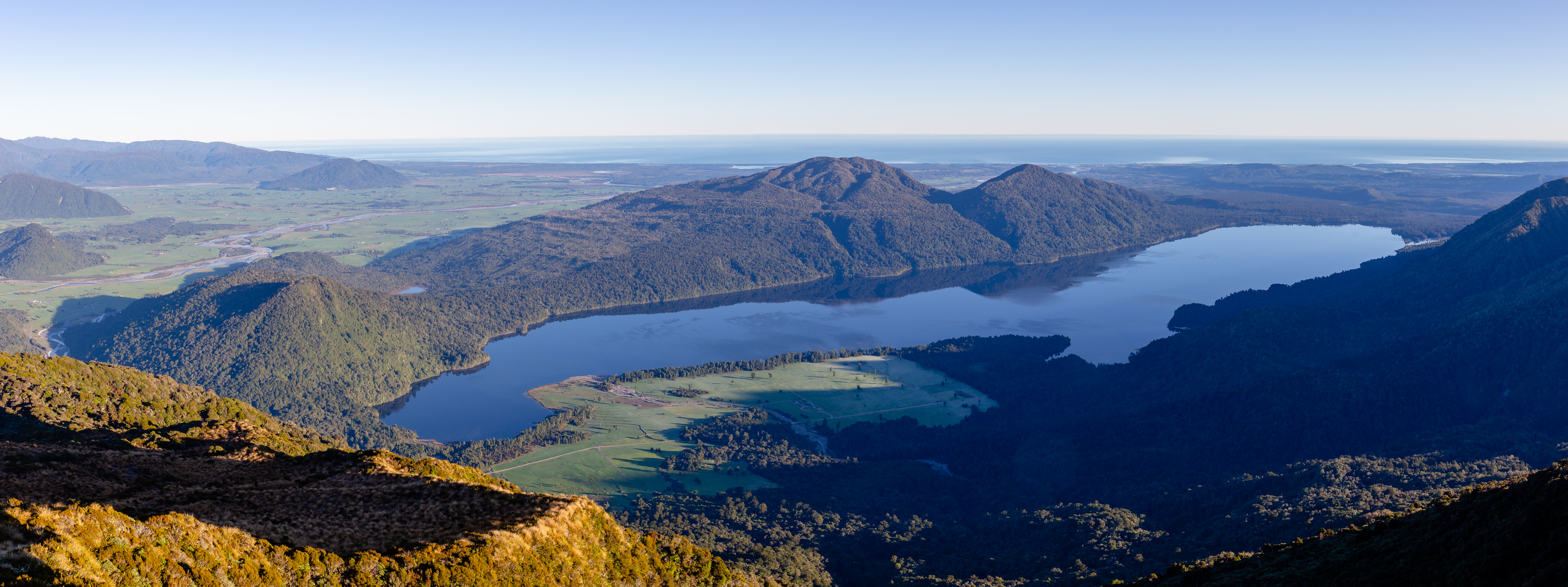
- Lake Kaniere with Mt Graham in the middle

Highest point
- Elevation: 829 m (2,720 ft)
- Coordinates: 42.83664°S 171.10415°E

Naming
- Defining authority: New Zealand Geographic Board

Geography
- Location within New Zealand
- Country: New Zealand
- Region: West Coast
- Territorial authority: Westland District
- Topo map: Land Information New Zealand NZ Topo50, BV19

Mount Graham is a mountain in the West Coast Region of New Zealand with an elevation of 829 metres above sea level. Lake Kaniere is immediately east of Mount Graham. It is also a prime spot for hunting red deer during the breeding season. The mountain is covered in dense bush which makes it hard to reach the summit.
