= Bad Blood (1981 film) =

- Theatrical poster
- Directed by: Mike Newell
- Produced by: Andrew Brown
- Starring: Jack Thompson; Carol Burns
- Cinematography: Gary Hansen
- Music by: Richard Hartley
- Production company: Southern Pictures
- Distributed by: Umbrella Entertainment
- Release dates: 1981 (United Kingdom); 25 May 1982 (Cannes); 14 April 1983 (Australia)
- Running time: 105 minutes
- Countries: New Zealand; United Kingdom
- Language: English
- Budget: £900,000

Bad Blood is a 1981 British-New Zealand thriller film set during World War II in the small town of Koiterangi (now Kowhitirangi) on the west coast of the South Island of New Zealand, and is based on the factual manhunt for mass-murderer Stanley Graham. The film was directed by English director Mike Newell, who went on to direct Four Weddings and a Funeral. Much of the film was shot at the original locations. The script was based upon Manhunt: The Story of Stanley Graham, by H. A. Willis (Whitcoulls, 1979) and adapted by New Zealand-born Andrew Brown.

== Plot ==
In October 1941 Stan Graham, a Westland smallholder, develops a persecution complex and starts to threaten his neighbours, in which he is encouraged by his wife. He then refuses to conform to a government order for all citizens to surrender their firearms for the duration of the war. Eventually a party of four policemen arrive to confiscate his firearms, which causes a flashpoint for Graham. With the help of his wife who shoots and injures one of them, Graham shoots and kills all the policemen and, in the ensuing altercations, three locals also. Shot and injured himself, Graham then heads into the surrounding forest. A manhunt is organised, involving police, army and local home guard members, and finally they track him down.

== Cast ==
- Jack Thompson as Stanley Graham
- Carol Burns as Dorothy Graham
- Denis Lill as Ted Best
- Martyn Sanderson as Les North
- Kelly Johnson as Jim Quirke
- Bruce Allpress as Inspector Calwell
- Ken Blackburn as Thommo Robson
- Cliff Wood as Henry Growcott
- Dulcie Smart as Evelyn Gibson
- Miranda Harcourt as Ivy Smith
- Peter Vere-Jones as Mr Ogier
- Marshall Napier as Trev Bond

== Release ==
Bad Blood was originally made for TV and screened in Britain in 1981. It was released in New Zealand on 12 November 1982. It was released on DVD in May 2006 and again on 16 September 2009. It was also released in the United Kingdom and in North America on 2 October 2007.

== Reception ==
Bad Blood received rave reviews in Britain and later in New Zealand. Although considered risky when released, Bad Blood is now regarded as a New Zealand film classic. It is regarded as featuring one of Jack Thompson's finest performances.
