= Stanley Graham =

New Zealand mass murderer (1900–1941)

- Graham in the early 1930s
- Born: Eric Stanley George Graham; 12 November 1900; Kokatahi, New Zealand
- Died: 21 October 1941 (aged 40); Hokitika, New Zealand
- Cause of death: Gunshot wounds
- Occupation: Dairy farmer
- Motive: Disputes with a neighbor and the police

Details
- Date: 8–9 October 1941
- Locations: Kowhitirangi, South Island, New Zealand
- Killed: 7
- Weapon: 7mm Mauser rifle

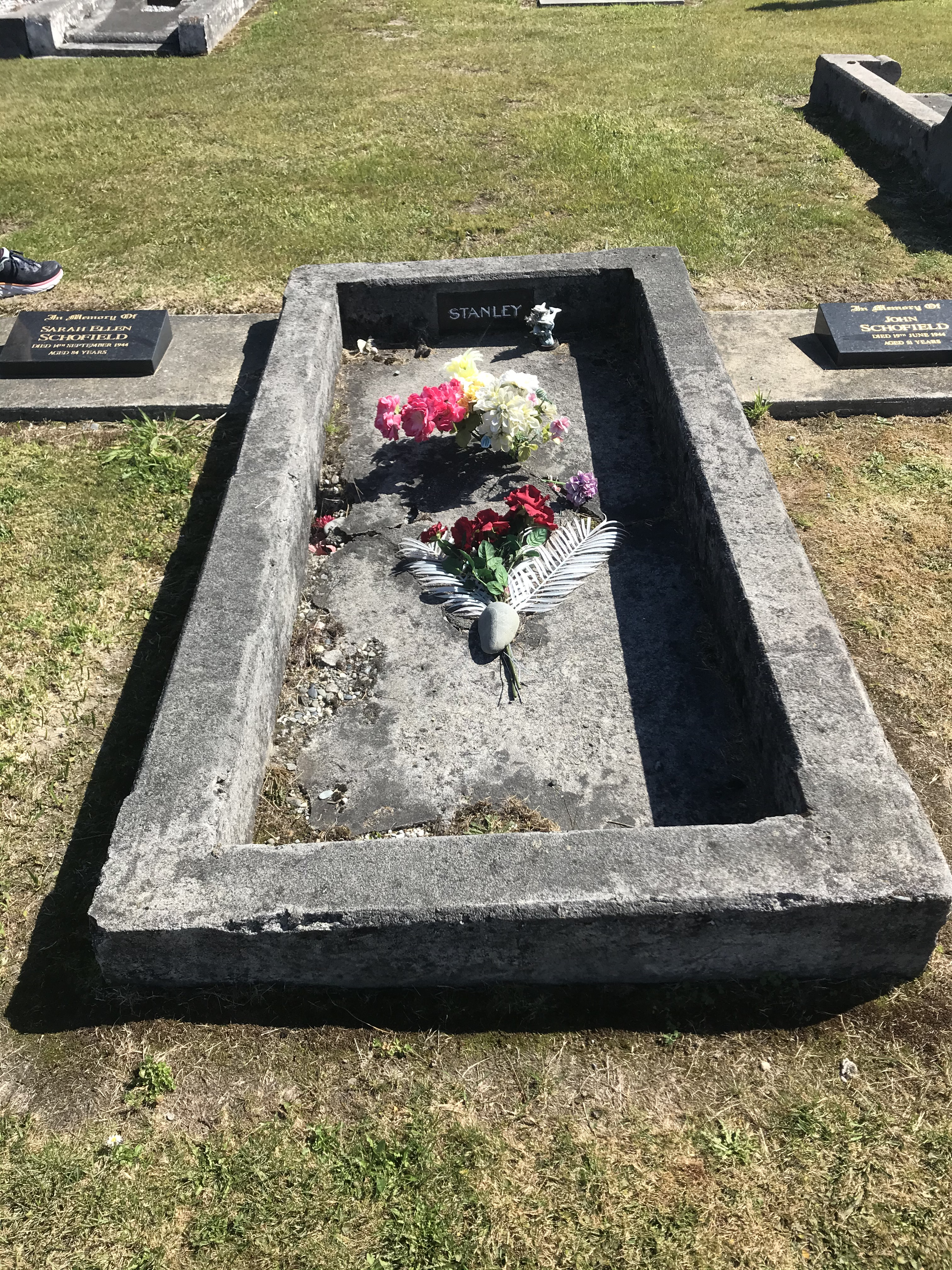
Graham's grave at Hokitika Cemetery

Eric Stanley George Graham (12 November 1900 – 21 October 1941) was a New Zealander who killed seven people.

== Early life ==
Graham was born and raised in Kokatahi, New Zealand and, as a child, worked at the Longford Hotel, built in 1902, ten miles from Hokitika, whose proprietor was his father, John Graham. Graham met his wife, Dorothy McCoy, when she moved from Rakaia in the late 1920s to work at the hotel.

They married in Christchurch on 22 December 1930, living there for six months before moving to run a small dairy farm at Kowhitirangi on the West Coast. They were to have a son and a daughter.

Through the late 1930s, Graham maintained reasonably good relations with his neighbours, although he and his wife took little part in social life. By 1940, though, the Graham family was under severe financial pressure, having had cream condemned by the Westland Co-operative Dairy Company and incurred debt from a venture into cattle breeding. As income from his farm dropped, he fell into debt totalling more than £550 (equivalent to $30,000 in 2026). His behaviour took a turn for the worse, and he began threatening and abusing passing neighbours. Graham and his wife practised target shooting from the back of their home in the middle of the night. Graham was an expert marksman and had an assortment of firearms.

In early 1941, Graham was in a dispute with the police, who wanted his .303 rifle for war use. This was finally handed over on 15 July, but Graham and his wife still held a shotgun and two Winchester rifles, a .22 and a .405.

On 11 September, at Ashby Bergh's department store at High Street in central Christchurch, Mrs. Graham purchased, on her husband's behalf, a 7mm Mauser rifle and ammunition. This was the weapon Graham used to shoot his victims.

== Day of the rampage ==
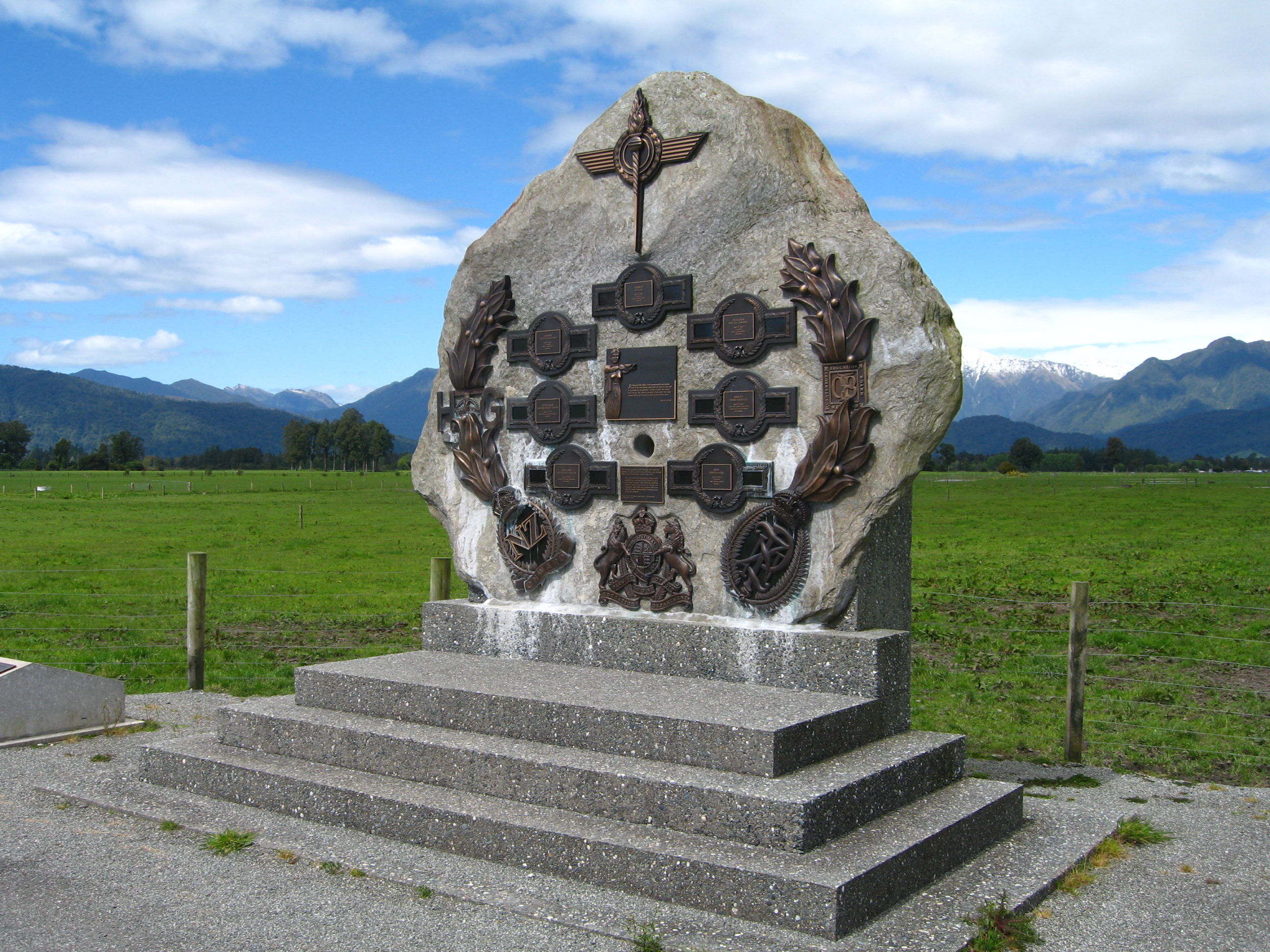
Memorial for the Incident, Kowhitirangi. The memorial is mounted on a rock from nearby Diedrichs' Creek, and was unveiled on 8 October 2004. The artist was Barry Thomson of Glenavy.

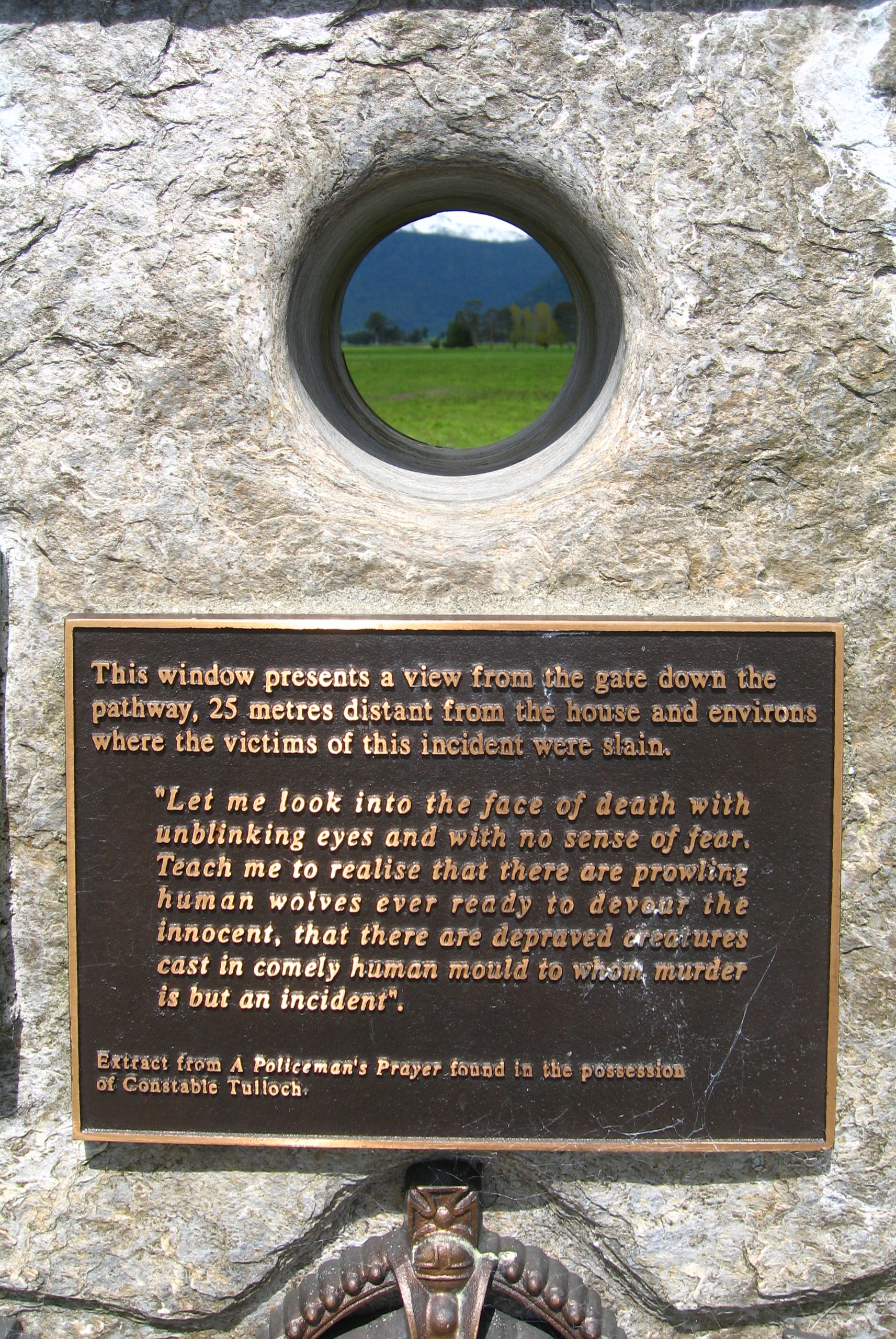
Detail of the memorial

On 4 October 1941, a neighbour of Graham's, Anker Madsen, complained to Constable Edward Best, stationed in nearby Kaniere, that Graham was accusing him of poisoning his cattle. Best decided not to respond in order to give Graham time to calm down.

On 8 October, Graham confronted Madsen with a rifle. Later that morning, Best attempted to discuss the matter with Graham but backed off after Graham pointed two rifles out of a window at him. Best retreated to Hokitika for back-up and returned to the farm with Sergeant William Cooper, 43; and Constables Frederick William Jordan, 26, and Percy Campbell Tulloch, 35. After a short conversation inside his house, Graham shot and wounded Cooper and Best after the former apparently reached to disarm Graham. He then fired at Jordan and Tulloch as they ran into the house, killing them both instantly with one bullet. When the badly wounded Cooper attempted to leave to obtain help, Graham shot him dead on the path in front of the house. Best was shot once more after allegedly attempting to plead with him and died three days later. Graham also fatally wounded a field instructor for the Canterbury education board named George Ridley, who had entered Graham's property to assist any wounded. Ridley was accompanied by an armed local, whom Graham threatened and disarmed. Ridley succumbed to his injuries in March 1943.

Graham then fled his house, armed with both of his Winchester rifles, his 7mm Mauser Rifle, the .303 rifle taken from the local who had accompanied George Ridley into Graham's property, and a .32 ACP Colt Revolver stolen from Sergeant Cooper's body.

== Manhunt and death ==
Returning the next evening to discover three members of the Home Guard in his house, Graham opened fire and killed home guardsmen Richard "Maxie" Coulson and Gregory Hutchison in a gunfight. During that engagement, he was wounded in the right shoulder.

The ensuing manhunt was the biggest in New Zealand history. It was overseen by Commissioner of Police Denis Cummings. More than 100 New Zealand Police and several hundred New Zealand Army and Home Guard personnel searched the area for Graham for 12 days, with orders to shoot on sight if they found Graham armed.

On 10 October, both of Graham's Winchester rifles and 800 rounds of ammunition were discovered. Blood was discovered on one of the rifles, suggesting he had been wounded.

In the next few days, Graham's blood-soaked shirt and the .303 rifle he had stolen earlier were recovered, and after 9 October, he was sighted numerous times by home guardsmen and civilians and, on at least three occasions, was fired upon whilst attempting to return to his home or simply walking in its vicinity. On at least two occasions, cattle on nearby farms were found slashed or shot, and on at least one occasion, a dead heifer was found with meat taken from it.

On 17 October, a farmhouse belonging to Henry Growcott, a childhood friend of Graham's, was broken into and food was taken.

On 20 October, parties of police were positioned around his home, expecting Graham to return to the Growcott farm. In the middle of the night, after being spotted by two police constables and a local civilian carrying his rifle and ammunition belts, an injured Graham was shot by Auckland Constable James D'Arcy Quirke with a .303 rifle from a distance of 25 metres as he crawled through a patch of scrub. After being shot, he was surrounded by almost a hundred police and army personnel, reportedly telling one of them that he "could have shot some more". He died the following morning at approximately 5:25 a.m. at Westland Hospital, Hokitika, the same hospital where Constable Best had died from his injuries. He was buried at Hokitika Cemetery. Constable Quirke reported that Graham told him he was intending to give up that night.

Later that month, the Graham property was burnt to the ground and Mrs Graham and her children left the area.

== In popular culture ==
There have been several biographical accounts of his life and the murders published since the tragedies occurred.

In 1968, the Australian drama series Homicide based episode 180, "Dead or Alive", on the case, with the Graham character being played by Brian Wenzel. Unlike real life, the Graham character is captured alive, with the detectives wondering at the end of the episode whether he would be found insane or sentenced to death.

In 1974, Nightwood Films produced a 26-minute documentary concerning the manhunt. This film is the only audio-visual record of many of the participants' recollections. It was also the first time the large cache of photographs taken during the manhunt by Home Guardsman Dave Stevenson were made public.

A 1981 British-New Zealand film, Bad Blood, was made about Stanley Graham and his chain of killings, as well as the dimensions of historical context and social injustice involved. Australian actor Jack Thompson played Graham.

== See also ==
- List of massacres in New Zealand
- Crime in New Zealand
