= Mesovouno massacres =

WWII nazi atrocities

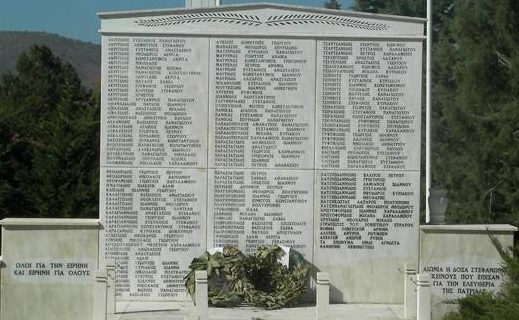
Mesovouno massacre memorial

The Mesovouno massacre (Greek: Οι σφαγές του Μεσόβουνου) refers to two massacres perpetrated by members of the Wehrmacht in the village of Mesovouno in Ptolemaida, Greece, during the Axis occupation of Greece, carried out on 23 October 1941 and 22 April 1944.

On 23 October 1941, the Wehrmacht soldiers gathered all men aged 16–69 years old, killed them with machine guns and set the houses on fire. In 1944 the village was razed by Nazi troops two days before the massacre of the village Pyrgoi in Ptolemaida. A total of 268 civilians were killed.

In the 1941 massacre, Mesovouno was part of a series of mass executions by the Nazis that took place from 17 to 28 of October, the rest being the executions of the inhabitants of the villages Kalokastro and Kerdylia in Serres, of Kleisto, Kidonia and Ambelofyto in Kilkis.

There are annual wakes in the village in memory of the victims, in which members of the Greek Parliament and the President of Greece officially participate.
