= Mesovouno =

Mesovouno Μεσόβουνο
- Community
- Location within Greece
- Coordinates: 40°37.6′N 21°50′E
- Country: Greece
- Administrative region: West Macedonia
- Regional unit: Kozani
- Municipality: Eordaia
- Municipal unit: Vermio
- Elevation: 840 m (2,760 ft)

Population (2021)
  - Community: 334
- Time zone: UTC+2 (EET)
  - Summer (DST): UTC+3 (EEST)
- Postal code: 500 06
- Area code: +30-2463
- Vehicle registration: ΚΖ

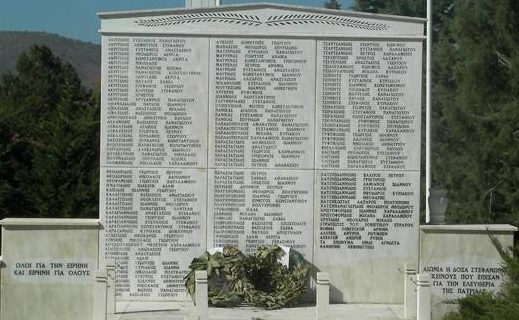
Monument in memory of the victims of the Mesovouno massacre

Mesovouno (Greek: Μεσόβουνο), known before 1927 as Karmishta (Greek: Κρίμσια), is a village and a community of the Eordaia municipality. Before the 2011 local government reform it was part of the municipality of Vermio, of which it was a municipal district. The 2021 census recorded 334 inhabitants in the village. The village is populated primarily by Pontian Greek refugees who arrived from the Sivas region of Asia Minor during the Greek–Turkish population exchange in the early 1920s. The 1928 Greek census recorded 801 village inhabitants. In 1928, the refugee families numbered 220 (805 people).

== History ==
In October 1941 and April 1944, during the Axis occupation of Greece, the Wehrmacht perpetrated the Mesovouno massacres in the village. A total of 268 civilians were killed.
