= Rimu, New Zealand =

Locality in Westland District, West Coast Region, New Zealand

Rimu
- Interactive map of Rimu
- Coordinates: 42°46′10″S 170°59′45″E
- Country: New Zealand
- Region: West Coast
- District: Westland District
- Electorates: West Coast-Tasman; Te Tai Tonga

Area
  - Total: 74.67 km^{2} (28.83 sq mi)

Population (2023 census)
  - Total: 258
  - Density: 3.46/km^{2} (8.95/sq mi)
- Time zone: UTC+12 (NZST)
  - Summer (DST): UTC+13 (NZDT)
- Postcode: 7883
- Area code: 03
- Local iwi: Ngāi Tahu

Rimu, originally known as Upper Woodstock, is a small town in the Westland District of New Zealand's South Island.

Rimu is located some 8 kilometres (5.0 mi) by road south of Hokitika and located on the south side of the Hokitika River. It is immediately south of Woodstock. It is named for the native tree Dacrydium cupressinum—with the common name "rimu"—that was once prevalent in the area. Rimu was founded in the 1800s and grew rapidly when gold was found in 1882 west of the town. In 1890, gold was discovered east of Rimu. These were New Zealand's last gold rushes.

Around 1900, Rimu had a school, two banks, two hotels, two churches, two butcheries, four stores, a post office, and a library.

== Demographics ==
Rimu locality, which includes Woodstock, covers 74.67 km^{2} (28.83 sq mi). It is part of the larger Hokitaka Rural statistical area.

Historical population
Year	Pop.	±% p.a.
2006	195	—
2013	222	+1.87%
2018	255	+2.81%
2023	258	+0.23%

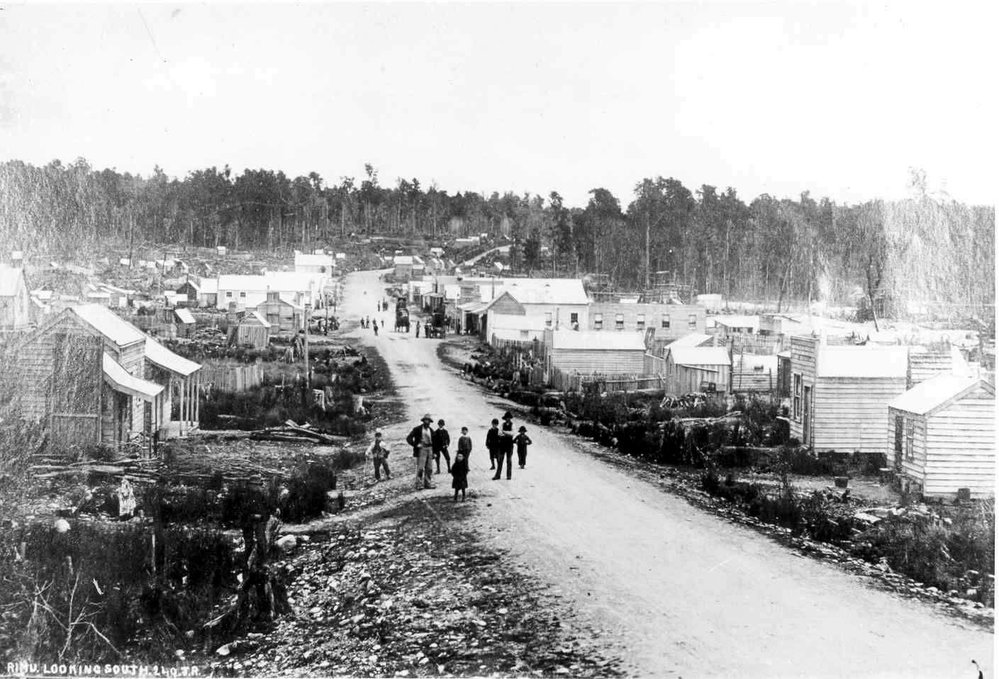
Rimu in circa 1900

Rimu had a population of 258 in the 2023 New Zealand census, an increase of 3 people (1.2%) since the 2018 census, and an increase of 36 people (16.2%) since the 2013 census. There were 141 males and 120 females in 126 dwellings. 1.2% of people identified as LGBTIQ+. There were 33 people (12.8%) aged under 15 years, 39 (15.1%) aged 15 to 29, 135 (52.3%) aged 30 to 64, and 51 (19.8%) aged 65 or older.

People could identify as more than one ethnicity. The results were 93.0% European (Pākehā), 8.1% Māori, 1.2% Asian, and 9.3% other, which includes people giving their ethnicity as "New Zealander". English was spoken by 98.8%, and other languages by 7.0%. No language could be spoken by 1.2% (e.g. too young to talk). New Zealand Sign Language was known by 1.2%. The percentage of people born overseas was 12.8, compared with 28.8% nationally.

Religious affiliations were 24.4% Christian, 1.2% Hindu, and 1.2% other religions. People who answered that they had no religion were 64.0%, and 10.5% of people did not answer the census question.

Of those at least 15 years old, 27 (12.0%) people had a bachelor's or higher degree, 138 (61.3%) had a post-high school certificate or diploma, and 60 (26.7%) people exclusively held high school qualifications. 12 people (5.3%) earned over $100,000 compared to 12.1% nationally. The employment status of those at least 15 was 117 (52.0%) full-time, 36 (16.0%) part-time, and 6 (2.7%) unemployed.

== Education ==
Woodstock Primary School operated from 1876 to 1968.

St Mary's School was a Catholic school run by the Sisters of Mercy, which opened in 1901 and closed in 1942.
