= Kaniere =

Town in West Coast, New Zealand

- Interactive map of Kaniere
- Coordinates: 42°44′53″S 171°0′26″E
- Country: New Zealand
- Region: West Coast
- District: Westland District
- Ward: Northern
- Electorates: West Coast-Tasman; Te Tai Tonga

Government
  - Territorial Authority: Westland District Council
  - Regional council: West Coast Regional Council
  - Mayor of Westland: Helen Lash
  - West Coast-Tasman MP: Maureen Pugh
  - Te Tai Tonga MP: Tākuta Ferris

Area
  - Total: 2.94 km^{2} (1.14 sq mi)

Population (June 2025)
  - Total: 570
  - Density: 190/km^{2} (500/sq mi)
- Time zone: UTC+12 (NZST)
  - Summer (DST): UTC+13 (NZDT)
- Postcode: 7811
- Area code: 03
- Local iwi: Ngāi Tahu

Kaniere is a small town in the Westland District of the West Coast region of New Zealand's South Island. Hokitika lies to the north-west, and the Hokitika River flows past to the south-west.

The locality began about 1865 as one of the main alluvial gold fields of the West Coast gold rush. The Hokitika & Kanieri Tramway laid with wooden rails was established from Hokitika by 1868, with cars drawn by horses. A road followed by 1873.

Kaniere often seen written Kanieri, official spelling of the town is Kaniere

Locality on the Hokitika River, 5 km southeast of Hokitika. Kaniere Survey District.

History/Origin/Meaning:

Reeds Dictionary of New Zealand Place Names gives the following explanation, "Kani is the act of sawing greenstone preparatory to making tools, weapons or ornaments, a long wearisome process. The name was formerly and incorrectly spelt Kanieri. The terminal ere or eri is inexplicable. There is just a possibility that it was originally oro, literally to grind or sharpen on a stone. It may be significant that, according to legend, Kanioro was the fabled guardian of greenstone". Instead of Kanieri. This decision confirms and supersedes the decision of 1930. (Gaz 1948, p939)

== Demographics ==
Kaniere is described by Stats NZ as a rural settlement and covers 2.94 km^{2} (1.14 sq mi). It had an estimated population of 570 as of June 2025, with a population density of 194 people per km^{2}. The settlement is part of the larger Hokitika Rural statistical area.

Historical population for Kaniere
Year	Pop.	±% p.a.
2006	291	—
2013	489	+7.70%
2018	504	+0.61%
2023	543	+1.50%
The 2006 population is for a smaller area of 1.30 km^{2}. Source:

Kaniere had a population of 543 in the 2023 New Zealand census, an increase of 39 people (7.7%) since the 2018 census, and an increase of 54 people (11.0%) since the 2013 census. There were 264 males, 276 females, and 3 people of other genders in 222 dwellings. 2.8% of people identified as LGBTIQ+. The median age was 47.0 years (compared with 38.1 years nationally). There were 84 people (15.5%) aged under 15 years, 81 (14.9%) aged 15 to 29, 252 (46.4%) aged 30 to 64, and 123 (22.7%) aged 65 or older.

People could identify as more than one ethnicity. The results were 91.2% European (Pākehā), 13.3% Māori, 0.6% Pasifika, 2.8% Asian, and 6.6% other, which includes people giving their ethnicity as "New Zealander". English was spoken by 98.9%, Māori by 1.7%, Samoan by 0.6%, and other languages by 5.5%. No language could be spoken by 0.6% (e.g. too young to talk). New Zealand Sign Language was known by 0.6%. The percentage of people born overseas was 11.0, compared with 28.8% nationally.

Religious affiliations were 29.8% Christian, 1.1% Buddhist, 0.6% New Age, and 0.6% other religions. People who answered that they had no religion were 61.3%, and 6.6% of people did not answer the census question.

Of those at least 15 years old, 75 (16.3%) people had a bachelor's or higher degree, 261 (56.9%) had a post-high school certificate or diploma, and 120 (26.1%) people exclusively held high school qualifications. The median income was $42,200, compared with $41,500 nationally. 45 people (9.8%) earned over $100,000 compared to 12.1% nationally. The employment status of those at least 15 was 252 (54.9%) full-time, 63 (13.7%) part-time, and 3 (0.7%) unemployed.

=== Hokitika Rural statistical area ===
Hokitika Rural statistical area, which also includes Ruatapu and Rimu, covers 140.96 km^{2} (54.42 sq mi) and had an estimated population of 1,380 as of June 2025, with a population density of 9.8 people per km^{2}.

Historical population for Hokitika Rural
Year	Pop.	±% p.a.
2006	1,287	—
2013	1,104	−2.17%
2018	1,185	+1.43%
2023	1,317	+2.13%
The 2006 population is for a larger area of 154.38 km^{2}. Source:

Hokitika Rural had a population of 1,317 in the 2023 New Zealand census, an increase of 132 people (11.1%) since the 2018 census, and an increase of 213 people (19.3%) since the 2013 census. There were 672 males, 645 females, and 3 people of other genders in 594 dwellings. 2.3% of people identified as LGBTIQ+. The median age was 49.9 years (compared with 38.1 years nationally). There were 207 people (15.7%) aged under 15 years, 168 (12.8%) aged 15 to 29, 648 (49.2%) aged 30 to 64, and 291 (22.1%) aged 65 or older.

People could identify as more than one ethnicity. The results were 92.5% European (Pākehā), 12.5% Māori, 0.5% Pasifika, 1.6% Asian, and 5.7% other, which includes people giving their ethnicity as "New Zealander". English was spoken by 98.2%, Māori by 1.6%, Samoan by 0.2%, and other languages by 5.7%. No language could be spoken by 1.4% (e.g. too young to talk). New Zealand Sign Language was known by 0.7%. The percentage of people born overseas was 11.2, compared with 28.8% nationally.

Religious affiliations were 27.8% Christian, 0.2% Hindu, 0.5% Buddhist, 0.7% New Age, and 1.1% other religions. People who answered that they had no religion were 62.4%, and 7.5% of people did not answer the census question.

Of those at least 15 years old, 174 (15.7%) people had a bachelor's or higher degree, 642 (57.8%) had a post-high school certificate or diploma, and 297 (26.8%) people exclusively held high school qualifications. The median income was $39,100, compared with $41,500 nationally. 99 people (8.9%) earned over $100,000 compared to 12.1% nationally. The employment status of those at least 15 was 570 (51.4%) full-time, 165 (14.9%) part-time, and 15 (1.4%) unemployed.

== Education ==
Kaniere School is a coeducational contributing primary (years 1–6) school with a roll of 111 students as of July 2026. It was open by 1867, then called Kanieri School.

St Joseph's School in Kaniere was opened by the Sisters of Mercy in 1887. It closed in 1957.
