= Kokatahi River =

River in New Zealand

Coordinates: 42°50′S 171°01′E

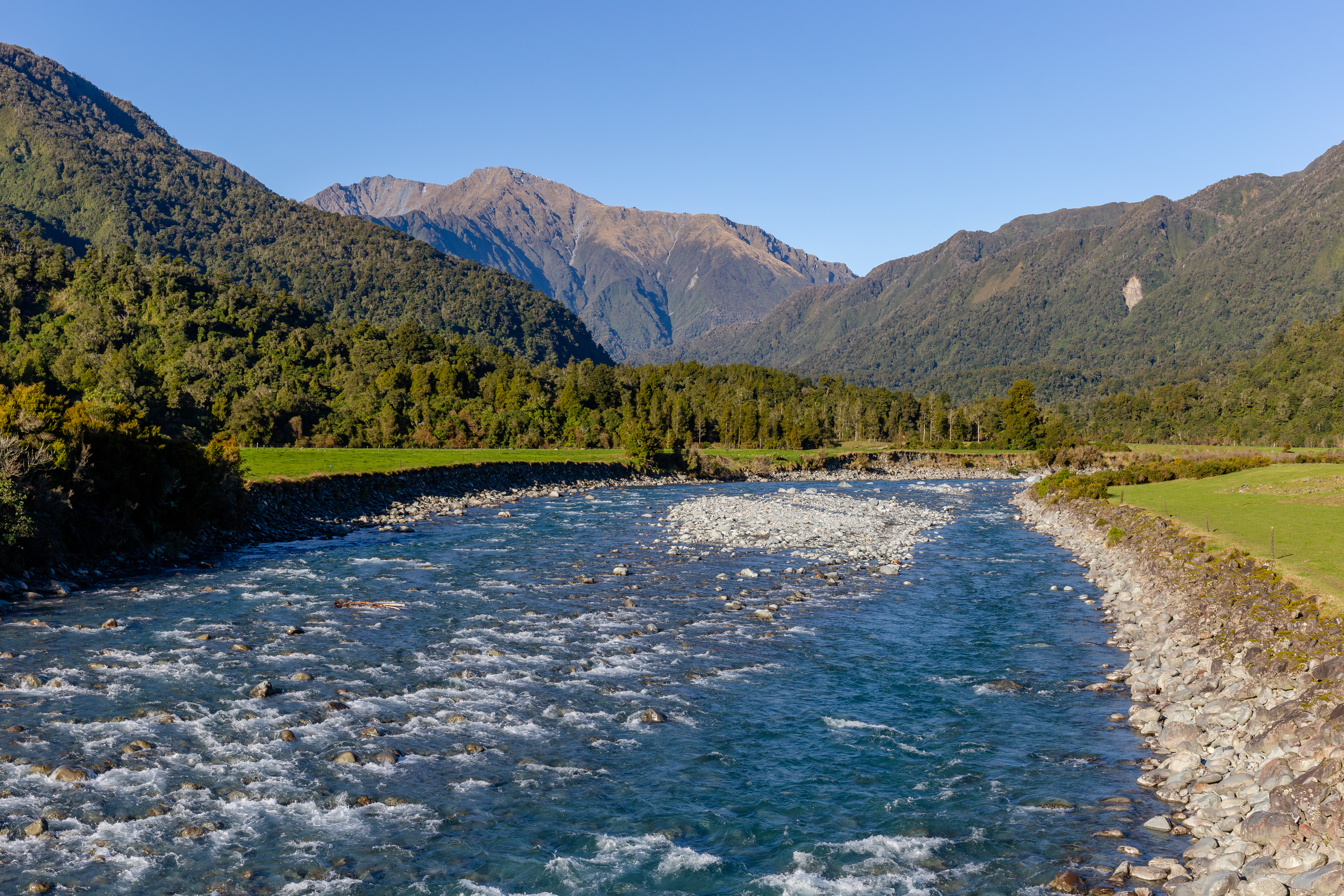

Location
- Country: New Zealand

Physical characteristics
- Source
  - location: Southern Alps
- Mouth
  - location: Hokitika River
- Length: 31 km (19 mi)

The Kokatahi River is a river of the West Coast Region of New Zealand's South Island. A major tributary of the Hokitika River, it flows northwest from its origins on the northern slopes of Mount Ambrose, reaching the Hokitika River 12 kilometres from the latter's mouth at Hokitika. The two rivers between them share one of the West Coast's larger floodplains.

== See also ==
- List of rivers of New Zealand
