= Hokitika River =

River in West Coast Region, New Zealand

Coordinates: 42°43′S 170°57′E

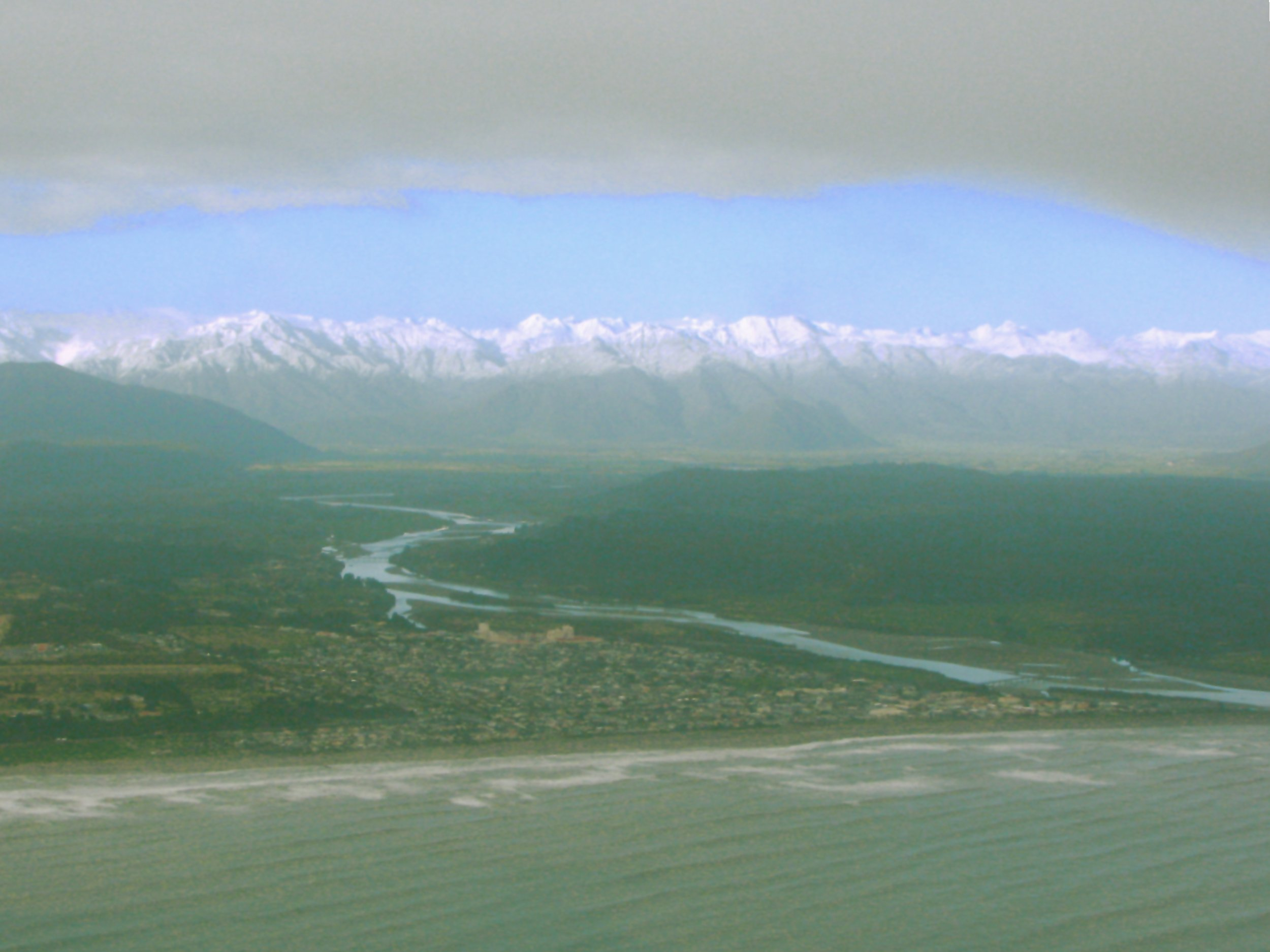
- Hokitika River with Southern Alps in the background

Location
- Country: New Zealand

Physical characteristics
- Source
  - location: Southern Alps
- Mouth
  - location: Tasman Sea
- Length: 64 km (40 mi)

The Hokitika River is in the West Coast of the South Island of New Zealand. It is about 64 kilometers (40 mi) long, beginning in the Southern Alps, emerging from the narrow Hokitika Gorge after merging with the Whitcombe River, and flowing into the Tasman Sea just south of the town of Hokitika. The river then feeds into the offshore Hokitika Canyon, which merges with the Cook Canyon to form the Cook Channel. The canyons extend to about 650 km (400 mi) and are important spawning areas for hoki, hake and orange roughy.

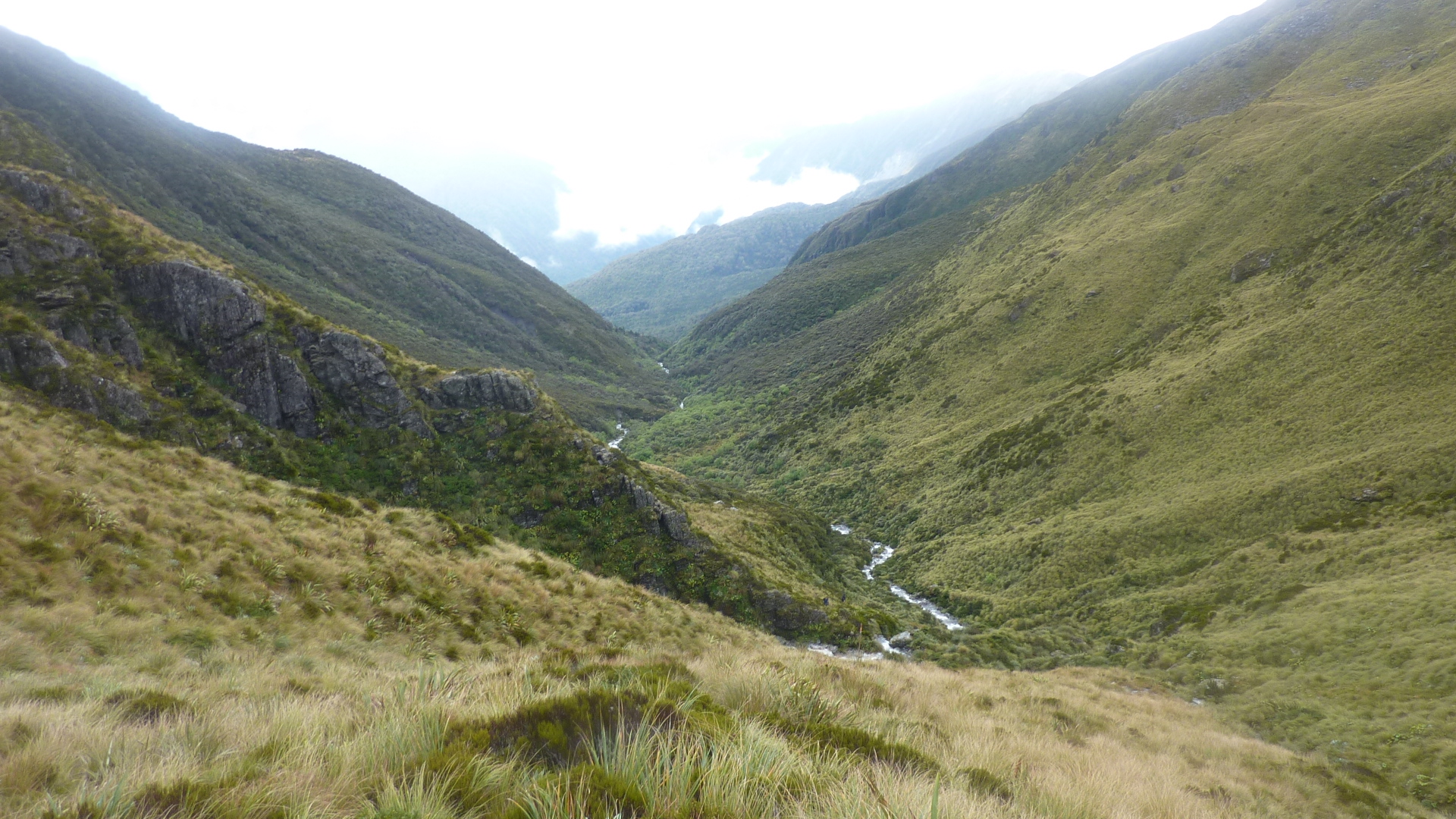
Hokitika River headwaters

The Hokitika River, and its eastern tributary, the Kokatahi River, have formed the Kowhitirangi-Kokatahi alluvial plain; a fertile and productive land extensively used for dairy farming.

The entrance to the Hokitika River was once used as a harbour during the West Coast gold rush; however, the sand bar at the river mouth created a treacherous and often fatal obstacle - resulting in many shipwrecks. After the gold-rush subsided, the use of the river as a harbour declined and is now no longer used.
