= Pukekura (disambiguation) =

Pukekura is a locality on the West Coast of New Zealand's South Island.

Pukekura may also refer to:

- Pukekura, a locality in the Waikato region of New Zealand
- Pukekura Park, a garden and events venue in New Plymouth, New Zealand
- Taiaroa Head, formerly known as Pukekura, in Otago, New Zealand
