= Westland Pioneers' Memorial =

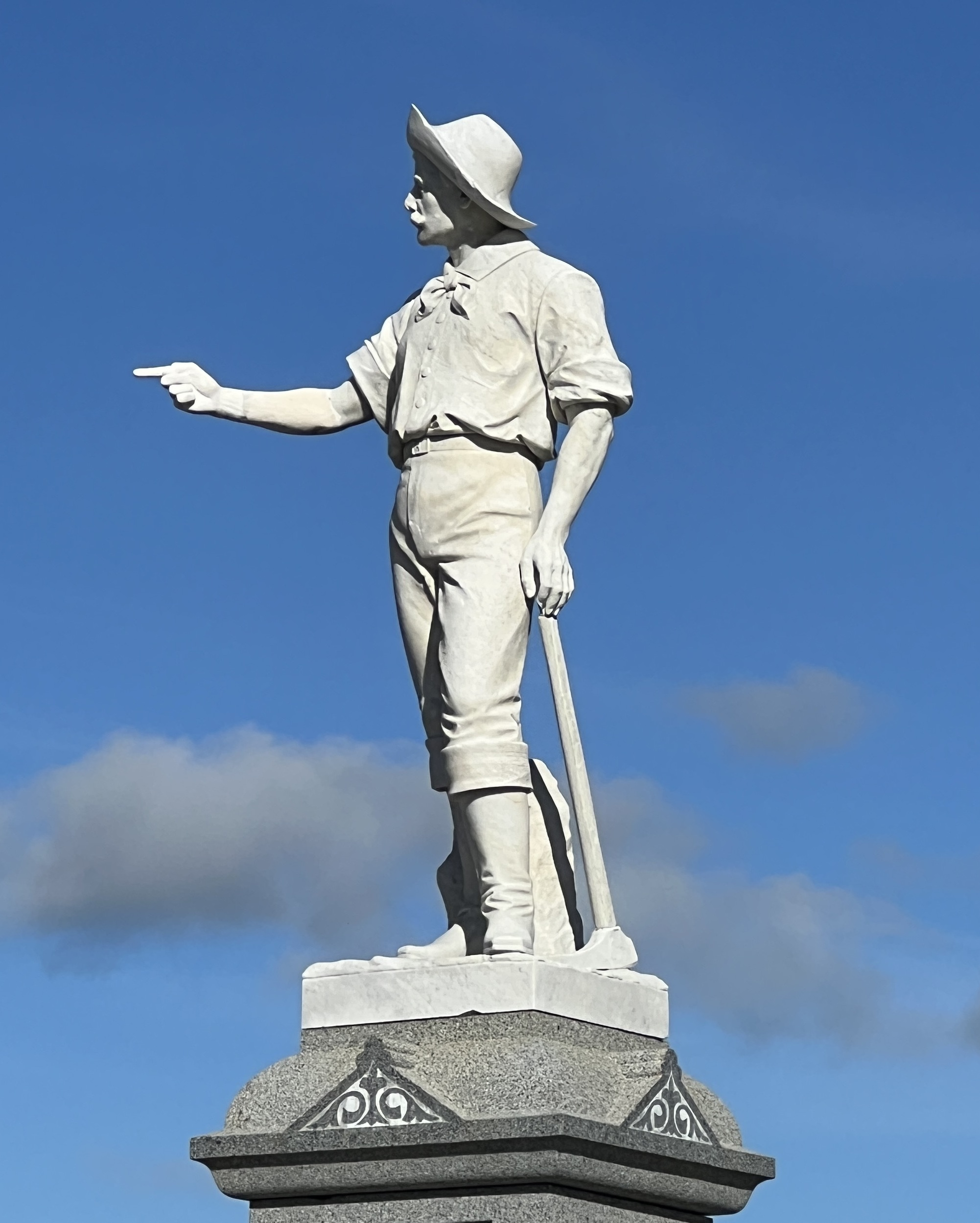
- Westland Pioneers' Memorial in its current position
- Interactive map of Westland Pioneers' Memorial
- 42°43′03.2″S 170°57′45.4″E
- Location: Hokitika, New Zealand

History
- Built: 1914
- Built for: Pioneers of Westland

Site notes
- Restored: 2016
- Governing body: Westland District Council

The Westland Pioneers' Memorial is a statue in Hokitika, New Zealand, commemorating the pioneer settlers of Westland. Unveiled in 1914, the statue had its right arm broken off in 2009 and was subsequently dubbed Venus de Hokitika. The memorial was relocated in 2016 from its original location on the side of State Highway 6 to the centre of a roundabout in one of Hokitika's main streets.

== Description ==
The memorial's height is 17 feet (5.2 m). It has a square pedestal with a marble statue on top. The pedestal has four plaques that read the following:

1. 1864–1914. In honour of the Pioneers of Westland, 'The Frontier Line.'
2. Where the Vanguard Camps To-day the Rear Shall Rest To-morrow.
3. Fortune's Buffets and Rewards, Ta'en with Equal Thanks.
4. Daring and Conquering – Though not Sharing in the After-Glow.

A sub-base was constructed of concrete. Square bases of granite placed on the concrete gave the structure supporting the pedestal a height of 5 feet (1.5 m). The Coromandel "granite" (tonalite) pedestal is framed by four Corinthian columns made of Labrador granite. A capping stone in dormer style supports the marble statue, the figure of a miner. The miner's left hand rests on a pickaxe.

== History ==
The purpose of the memorial is to commemorate the early pioneers of Westland. The term Westland refers to the West Coast and stems from the time of provincial New Zealand when the area was known as the Westland Province. A committee had formed to organise a statue and fundraise its costs. The chairman of the organising committee was Thomas Wanless Bruce, who at the time was the mayor of Ross. A pound-for-pound grant was sought from the government and Francis Bell in his role as Minister of Internal Affairs approved a grant up to NZ£200. The memorial was built by Thompson and Ralfe of Hokitika. The intention was to erect the memorial for the 50th jubilee of Westland but the festivities were held in January 1914. The memorial had been ordered by December 1913.

The memorial was unveiled on 8 July 1914 in front of a large crowd. The honour of unveiling fell on Mrs Perry, the Hokitika mayoress. Speeches were then given by mayors of surrounding boroughs (Greymouth, Ross, Kumara), chairmen of surrounding counties (Inangahua County and Westland County), Henry Michel as chairman of the Hokitika Harbour Board, one of the pioneers and the secretary of the memorial committee. The prime minister, members of the cabinet, the leader of the opposition, and members from the West Coast all put in their apologies. The 1914 parliamentary session had just started (on 25 June) and their absence was thus unavoidable. After the singing of the national anthem, God Save the Queen, the memorial was formally handed over to the Hokitika Borough. The West Coasters Association published a commemorative book entitled The Diggers' Story or Tales and Reminiscences of the Golden Coast direct from Westland's Earliest Pioneers.

In the 1989 local government reforms, Hokitika Borough was subsumed by Westland District and ownership of the memorial thus went to the district council. In January 2009, the memorial was vandalised and the statue's right arm was broken off. Subsequently, the memorial was dubbed Venus de Hokitika in reference to the armless statue Venus de Milo. The council took the left arm and the pickaxe into storage but the right hand had gone missing in the vandalism. The statue had previously had its arm broken off around six times, and by this time was missing its nose and jaw and had been damaged by stones.

=== Renovation and relocation ===
The Memorial Committee had originally asked for the memorial to be placed in the centre of the intersection of Fitzherbert and Stafford streets. At the time, those streets were the main roads connecting to outlying locations and the streets formed a cross intersection; the leg across the Ross Branch railway line has since been closed. On 24 October 1913, the committee appeared as a deputation in front of the Hokitika Borough Council and formally put the request to them, based on the precedent formed by the Hokitika Clock Tower that had been unveiled in 1903 in the centre of a nearby intersection. Whilst it was stressed that the chosen intersection was more spacious and the base of the memorial was just half the diameter of the clock tower, the council refused the request on concerns that the intersection would become congested. The committee recorded its regret and a further deputation requested on 5 December that the borough council purchase a reserve from the Railway Department of 40 square feet (3.7 m^{2}) at the corner of the same intersection. This request was accepted by the elected members. The committee also foreshadowed that they intended for the borough council to take on the memorial.

In 2012, when a committee worked on preparations for the 2014 sesquicentennial of the town, the idea was mooted to relocate the memorial to outside the Hokitika Museum. District councillor Jacquie Grant disagreed with the proposed location on the grounds that it is "out of the way" and obtained community support to have the memorial relocated to the intersection of Tancred and Weld streets. Grant also fundraised the amount needed to relocate the memorial so that it did not come as a cost to Westland District Council. The anniversary committee subsequently withdrew their relocation proposal.

The Westland Pioneers' Memorial was removed from its original site in early 2016, cleaned, and had the right arm and the pick axe replaced. Later in the same year, the memorial was placed in the roundabout at Tancred and Weld streets. It is thus in the same street as the town's most prominent landmark—the Hokitika Clock Tower—one block closer to the sea.

Relocation of the memorial
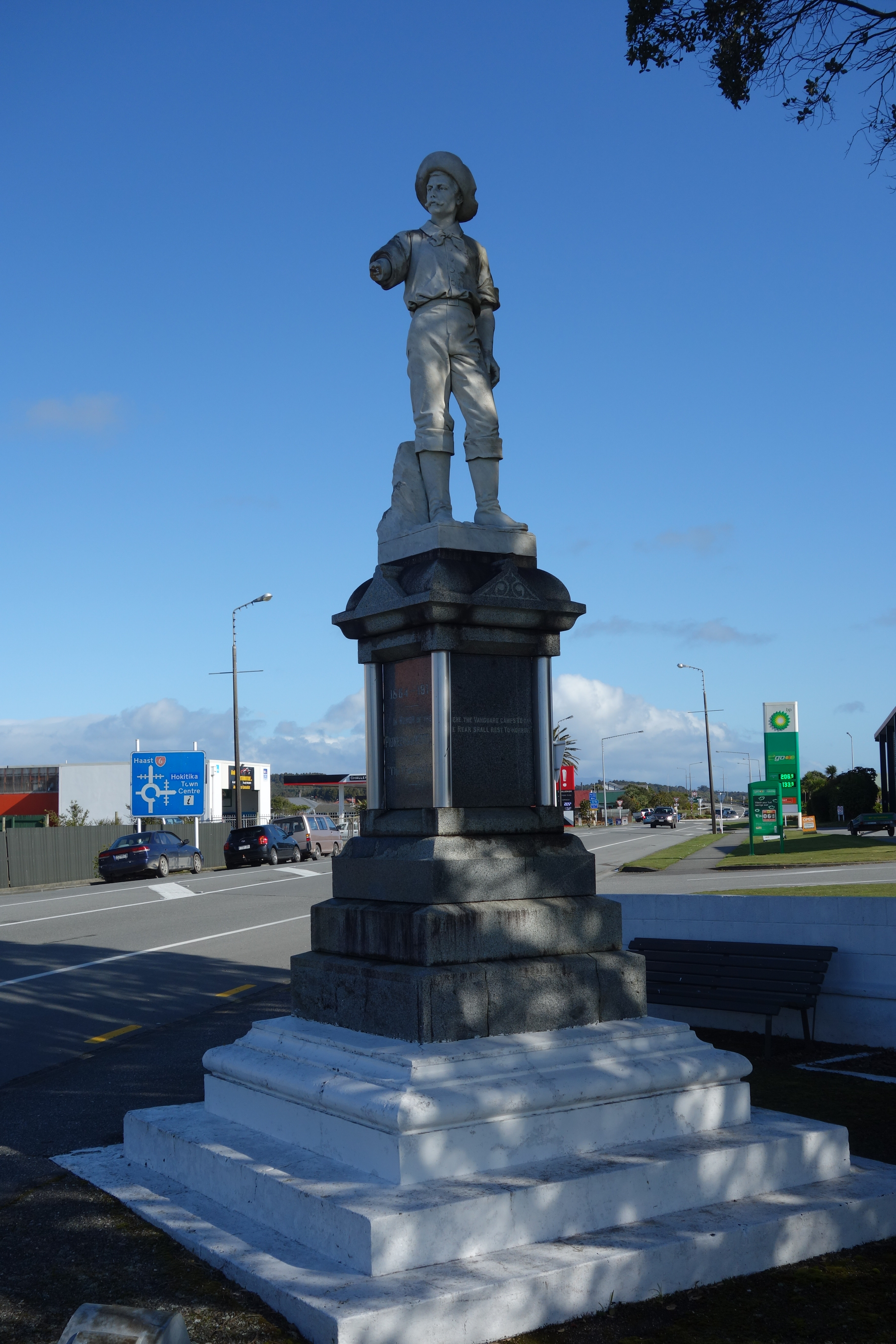
The vandalised memorial in its original location in 2015

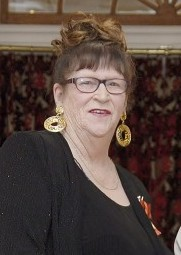
Jacquie Grant, the person behind the relocation

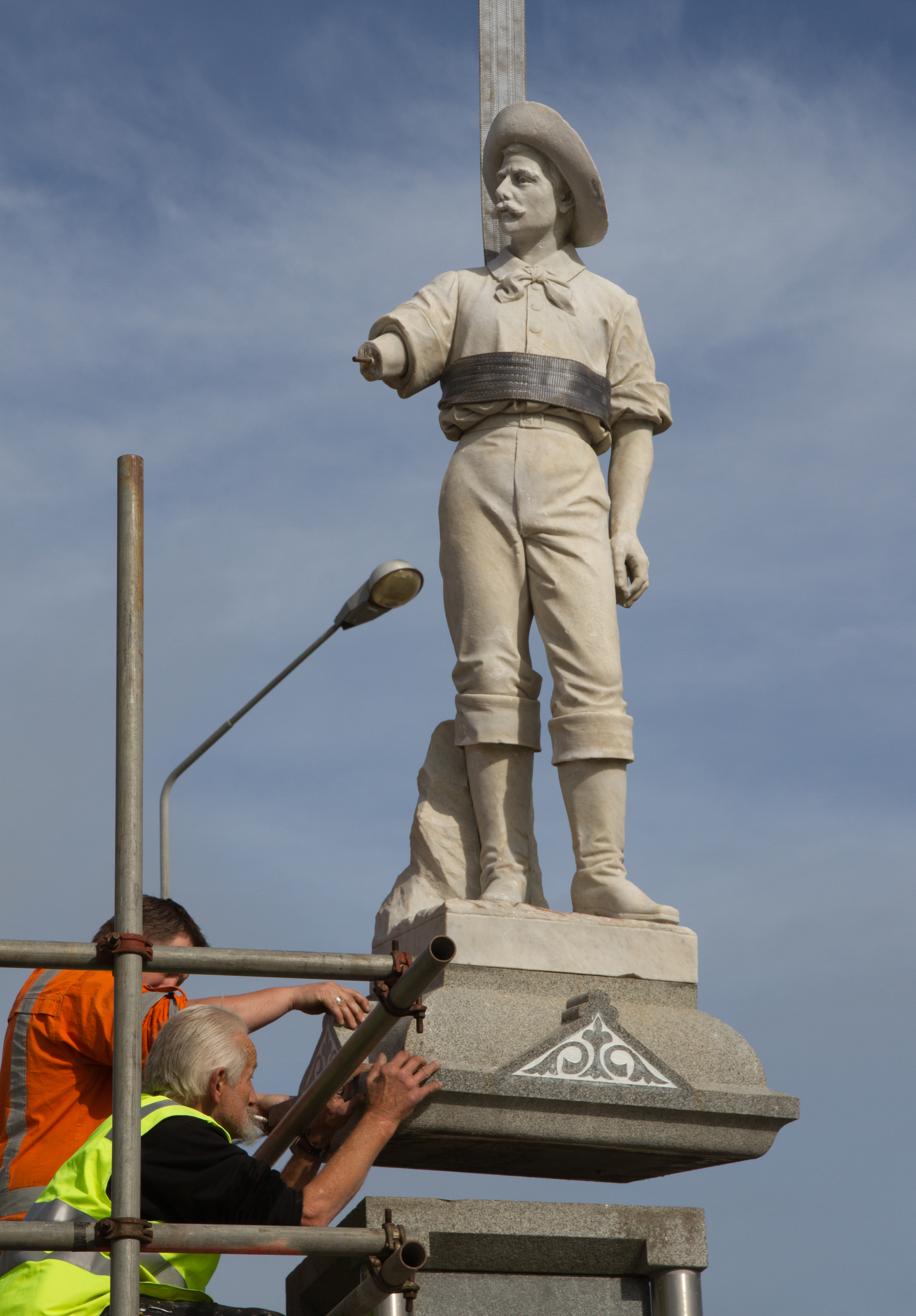
The memorial in the process of being relocated
