= Longburn Adventist College =

Location
- 100 Walkers Road, RD 7, Palmerston North, 4477; 40.3894°S 175.5575°E

Information
- Type: State-integrated; Day & Boarding
- Motto: In Christ, we educate, encourage and empower
- Denomination: Seventh-day Adventist Church
- Established: 1908
- Ministry of Education Institution no.: 191
- Principal: Rosalind Burnett
- Years: 7–13
- Gender: Coeducational
- Enrolment: 220 (July 2026)
- Socio-economic decile: 5M
- Website: lac.school.nz

Longburn Adventist College is an integrated co-educational Christian school in New Zealand for years 7 to 13. It is located just west of Palmerston North in the Manawatū District in the small dairy town of Longburn. It is a part of the Seventh-day Adventist education system, the world's second largest Christian school system.

== LAC House ==
'LAC House' became the official title for the Longburn Adventist College Boys' and Girls' Dormitories on 29 August 2013. LAC House is a co-educational boarding establishment for Year 7 to 13 students within the South Pacific Division of the Seventh-day Adventist Church, owned and operated by the Longburn Adventist College Board of Governors. The dormitories accommodate students in double or single lockable rooms, located on the main school campus.

The motto for LAC House is "Kia Puāwai Tātou | The Lord's Plans" based on Jeremiah 29:11

== History ==
The college was founded by the Seventh-day Adventist Church in 1908 and was originally sited at Pukekura, near Cambridge. The founder principal was Pastor Frank Chaney from Massachusetts. He was the principal, and was responsible for the design and construction of the original school, built largely with volunteer student labour.

A decision was made to relocate the college to Longburn in 1913 to be closer to the centre of the country's population at that time. Initially the college at Longburn was known as the 'Oroua Missionary College'.

In the early days of the college, the focus was on training young people for missionary service and most students worked, as well as studied, to pay their fees. The college ran a dairy farm, commercial vegetable garden, glasshouses, a basket factory and a lampshade business and it was from these enterprises that students earned their fees. Subjects originally offered included building construction, agriculture, secretarial and Bible work.

=== After World War II ===
Following World War II, secondary school classes were added to the courses offered at Longburn and in the 1960s the first year of a BA in Theology was offered. Primary teacher training was offered in the early 1970s until 1990. Up until the 1970s, most Longburn students were boarders, but day students began to increase in numbers as local residents took advantage of the secondary schooling offered at Longburn.

In the late 1980s, the college began to struggle for student numbers as the fees needed to run a private school excluded a number of potential students.

In 1993 Longburn became a fully state-integrated school operated by the Seventh-day Adventist Church and student numbers have increased to around the 280–300 mark each year.

Longburn Adventist College is now a Year 7–13 school with the majority of the students being day students, mainly from the Palmerston North area.

== Principal Leadership ==
=== Rosalind Burnett, Principal from 2023 to current ===
During Term 2, 2023 Ros Burnett took up the principalship of Longburn Adventist College, leaving her previous role of Deputy Principal at the school. She is the first female principal in the schools history. Previously, Ros worked at the Auckland Seventh-day Adventist Highschool (ASDAH) as an Assistant Principal.

=== Brendan van Oostveen, Principal from 2016 to 2022 ===
In 2016 Mr Brendan van Oostveen took up the role of principal at LAC. Mr van Oostveen was previously Deputy Principal at LAC from 2006 and prior to that he was a teacher at Tamatea College in the Hawkes Bay.

=== Bruce Sharp, Principal from 2006 to 2015 ===
In 2006 the school's roll was approved by the Ministry of Education for an increase. This was met with much relief, meaning more options available for students to choose from as well as helping the school to rise up from the financial difficulties it had faced since before previous principal Brian Mercer. In 2006 Mercer and vice principal Terry Rogers resigned from their roles to return to Australia. The new principal announced was Bruce Sharp who was already a teacher at the school when he applied for the position.

== Reunion ==
The school celebrated its 100th anniversary in March 2008 by publishing a book.

== Former names ==
- Pukekura Training School (Cambridge) 1908–1912
- Oroua Missionary College 1913–1923
- New Zealand Missionary College 1924–1966
- Longburn College 1967–1985
- Longburn Adventist College 1986–

== Curriculum ==
The school's curriculum consists primarily of the standard courses taught at college preparatory schools across the world. All students are required to take classes in the core areas of English, Basic Sciences, Mathematics, and Social Sciences.

== Spiritual aspects ==
All students take religion classes each year that they are enrolled. These classes cover topics in biblical history and Christian and denominational doctrines. Instructors in other disciplines also begin each class period with prayer or a short devotional thought, many which encourage student input. Weekly, the entire student body gathers together in the auditorium for an hour-long chapel service. Outside the classrooms, there is year-round spiritually oriented programming that relies on student involvement.

== See also ==
- List of Seventh-day Adventist secondary and elementary schools
- List of Seventh-day Adventist colleges and universities
- List of Seventh-day Adventist hospitals
- List of Seventh-day Adventist medical schools
- List of Seventh-day Adventist secondary schools
- List of schools in New Zealand
- Seventh-day Adventist education
