= Ross Branch =

Ross Branch may refer to:

- Ross Branch (motorcyclist), motorcycle racer
- Ross Branch (railway line), a New Zealand branch line
