= Longburn =

Settlement in Manawatū-Whanganui Region, New Zealand

Longburn Karere
- village
- Interactive map of Longburn
- Coordinates: 40°23′S 175°33′E
- Country: New Zealand
- Region: Manawatū-Whanganui region
- Territorial authority: Palmerston North City
- Ward: Te Hirawanui General Ward; Te Pūao Māori Ward
- Electorates: Palmerston North; Te Tai Hauāuru (Māori)

Government
  - Territorial Authority: Palmerston North City Council
  - Regional council: Horizons Regional Council
  - Mayor of Palmerston North: Grant Smith
  - Palmerston North MP: Tangi Utikere
  - Te Tai Hauāuru MP: Debbie Ngarewa-Packer

Area
  - Total: 0.94 km^{2} (0.36 sq mi)

Population (June 2025)
  - Total: 330
  - Density: 350/km^{2} (910/sq mi)

Longburn (or Karere) is a rural settlement just outside Palmerston North in the Manawatū-Whanganui area of New Zealand. Made up of large dairy processing plants Longburn is often mistaken to be a small township and not seen as a large satellite town of Palmerston North. The township is home to both Longburn School and Longburn Adventist College.

The population was estimated to be 330 as of June 2025.

== History ==
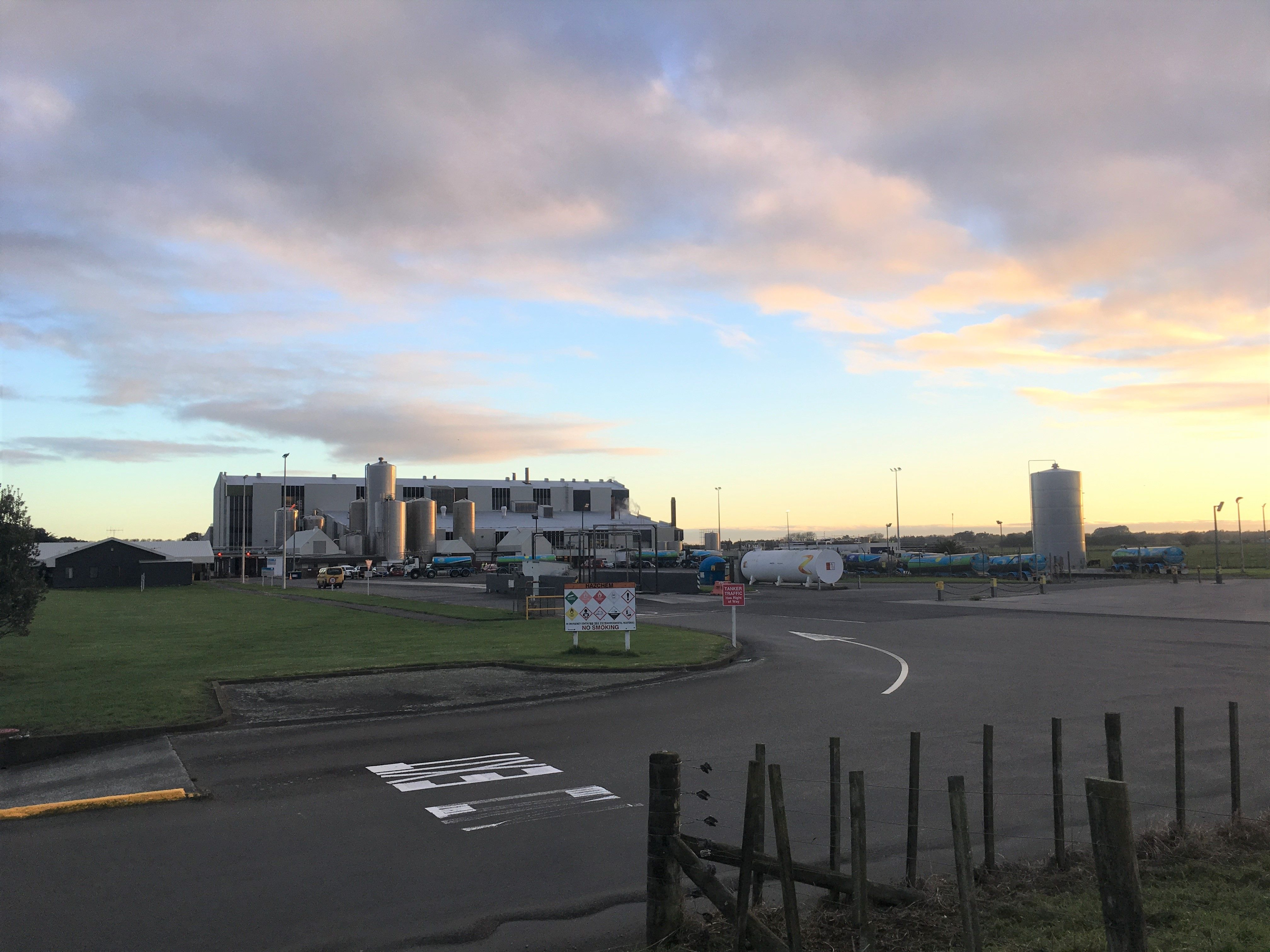
Fonterra Longburn 2019

Some of the region's earliest settlers settled in the Longburn area, including former Prime Minister of Denmark Bishop Ditlev Monrad and his family.

=== Dairy ===
A butter factory was opened in 1884, butter and cheese were exported in kegs to Britain.

An entirely new plant was opened at Longburn in 1966. Today Fonterra's Longburn milk processing plant in conjunction with its sister plant in Pahiatua collects milk daily from Lake Tutira in northern Hawke's Bay down to Whitemans Valley near Wellington.

In the peak milk season milk goes to casein production. There is a two-month winter shut-down each year. Raw milk is also processed at Longburn into concentrated milk and sent by rail to Fonterra Hāwera where it becomes whole milk powder, cheeses and associated products.

Fonterra Longburn has just over 90 staff in 2021 of which more than 70 are tanker drivers.

Fonterra from Longburn and its other plants in New Zealand is responsible for approximately 30% of the world's dairy exports

=== Freezing works ===
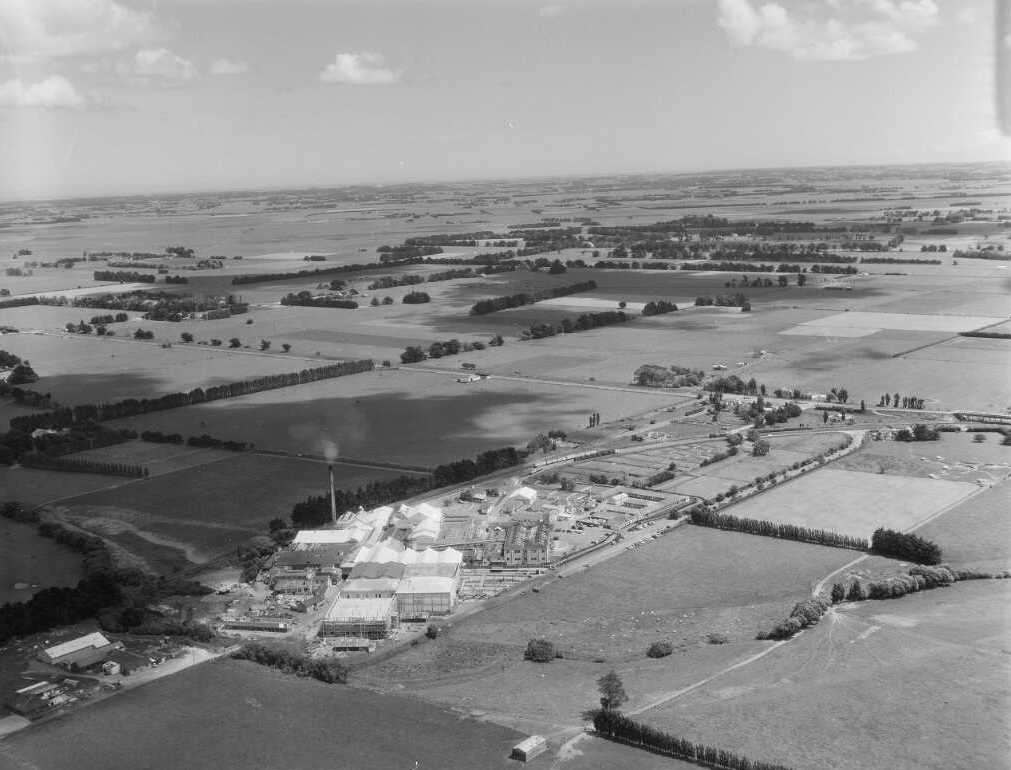
New freezing works under construction, 1958

Longburn Freezing Company Limited began their substantial operation in November 1889 on a 26 acres site beside the railway line. It soon experienced severe financial difficulties and, the undercapitalised business having borrowed large sums from them, the National Mortgage and Agency Company of New Zealand took control of the business during 1896. It was sold by NMA in 1940 to Manchester's Co-operative Wholesale Society, and closed in October 1987 under the management of Waitaki International.

The freezing works site covers over 11,000 hectares (27,000 acres) and various temperature-controlled buildings cover some 35,000 square metres.

=== Railway terminus ===
The Longburn Railway Station was the northern terminus of New Zealand's most prominent and successful private railway, the Wellington and Manawatu Railway Company. The line between Longburn and Wellington was completed in 1886 and at Longburn, passengers and goods transferred between the Wellington and Manawatu Railway and the New Zealand Railways Department network.

On 8 December 1908, the Wellington and Manawatu was absorbed into the New Zealand Railways, and Longburn lost its significant interchange status. However, the Foxton Branch was retained until it closed in 1959. The branch line resulted in the official name of the station changing from Long Burn to Longburn Junction. The name was adopted by the Junction Hotel opposite the station. The line through Longburn is now part of the North Island Main Trunk railway.

== Growth ==
In an attempt to attract growth to the Manawatu region, the Manawatu District Council agreed to cede part of its territory to Palmerston North City. However, Longburn was a part of this only to the eastern side of the North Island Main Trunk Railway, effectively cutting the settlement in half.

== Demographics ==
Longburn is described by Stats NZ as a rural settlement. It covers 0.94 km^{2} (0.36 sq mi) and had an estimated population of 330 as of June 2025, with a population density of 351 people per km^{2}. It is part of the larger Newbury statistical area.

Historical population
Year	Pop.	±% p.a.
2006	309	—
2013	354	+1.96%
2018	354	+0.00%
2023	327	−1.57%

Longburn had a population of 327 in the 2023 New Zealand census, a decrease of 27 people (−7.6%) since the 2018 census, and a decrease of 27 people (−7.6%) since the 2013 census. There were 162 males, 162 females, and 3 people of other genders in 111 dwellings. 4.6% of people identified as LGBTIQ+. The median age was 33.0 years (compared with 38.1 years nationally). There were 81 people (24.8%) aged under 15 years, 66 (20.2%) aged 15 to 29, 147 (45.0%) aged 30 to 64, and 30 (9.2%) aged 65 or older.

People could identify as more than one ethnicity. The results were 80.7% European (Pākehā), 34.9% Māori, 9.2% Pasifika, 6.4% Asian, and 1.8% other, which includes people giving their ethnicity as "New Zealander". English was spoken by 96.3%, Māori by 3.7%, Samoan by 1.8%, and other languages by 5.5%. No language could be spoken by 2.8% (e.g. too young to talk). New Zealand Sign Language was known by 0.9%. The percentage of people born overseas was 8.3, compared with 28.8% nationally.

Religious affiliations were 22.0% Christian, 1.8% Islam, 4.6% Māori religious beliefs, 1.8% New Age, and 0.9% other religions. People who answered that they had no religion were 60.6%, and 8.3% of people did not answer the census question.

Of those at least 15 years old, 27 (11.0%) people had a bachelor's or higher degree, 165 (67.1%) had a post-high school certificate or diploma, and 54 (22.0%) people exclusively held high school qualifications. The median income was $44,300, compared with $41,500 nationally. 9 people (3.7%) earned over $100,000 compared to 12.1% nationally. The employment status of those at least 15 was 138 (56.1%) full-time, 33 (13.4%) part-time, and 9 (3.7%) unemployed.

== Education ==
Longburn School is a co-educational state primary school for years 1 to 8, with a roll of 80. It opened in 1877 as Karere School, and moved to the current site in 1910.

Longburn Adventist College is a state-integrated secondary school for years 7 to 13, with a roll of 220. It opened in 1908 at Pukekura and moved to Longburn in 1913.

Both schools are co-educational. Rolls are as of July 2026,
