= Ko Taku Reo: Deaf Education New Zealand =

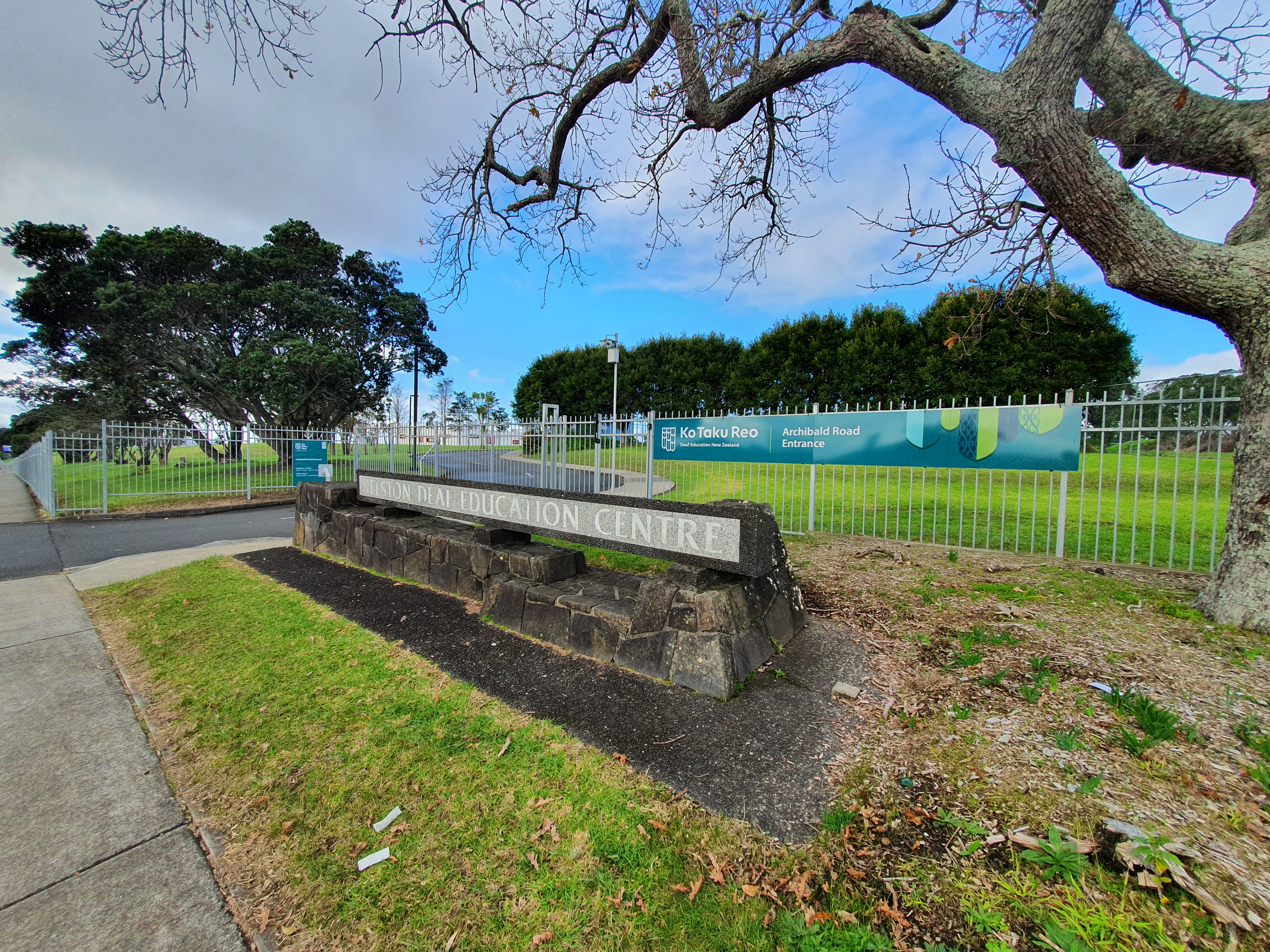
- Ko Taku Reo: Deaf Education New Zealand Kelston campus

Location
- 3 Archibald Road, New Lynn, Auckland; 36.9055°S 174.6656°E

Information
- Type: State co-ed special school with boarding facilities
- Established: 1958
- Ministry of Education Institution no.: 903
- Principal: David Foster
- Head of School: Tom Purvis and Christine Miller
- Enrolment: 104 (July 2026)
- Socio-economic decile: 3
- Website: https://kotakureo.school.nz/parents-and-whanau/

Ko Taku Reo: Deaf Education New Zealand is located in Archibald Road, New Lynn, Auckland, New Zealand. It is a residential special school for deaf children, as well as a resource centre providing services and support for mainstream students, students in provisions, and teachers in New Zealand.

The Kelston School for the Deaf was established in 1958, as the Kelston School for Deaf Children. It replaced the schools for the deaf at Mount Wellington and Lopdell House in Titirangi. It changed its name to Kelston Deaf Education Centre in 1991 to better reflect the wide range of services it provided. At the start of the third term of 2020 the school merged with the Van Asch Deaf Education Centre to form Ko Taku Reo, a national school for Deaf Education.
