= Jacquie Grant =

New Zealand community worker (born 1944)

Jacquie Grant ONZM
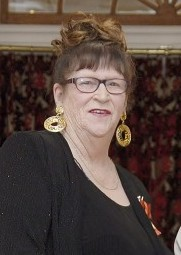
- Grant in 2018

Grey District Councillor
- In office 1998–2004

Personal details
- Born: 1942 or 1943 (age 83–84) Gippsland, Victoria, Australia
- Citizenship: New Zealander

Jacqueline Grant ONZM (born 1942 or 1943) is a New Zealand local politician, foster parent and museum owner. She was a Grey District Councillor between 1998 and 2004, and founded the Sock World museum in Hokitika. In 1998, Grant was appointed a Member of the New Zealand Order of Merit, for services to the community, and 20 years later she was promoted to Officer of the New Zealand Order of Merit, also for services to the community. She contested the Westland mayoralty in the 2025 local elections, losing by eight votes to Helen Lash.

== Early life ==
Grant was born in the Australian state of Victoria, and moved to Sydney at age 10 to live with her grandparents. Having fallen out with their grandparents, Grant reports living independently in Sydney's Kings Cross by the age of 13. As a trans person, Grant moved to New Zealand for safety.

== Life in New Zealand ==
Grey served two terms on Grey District Council from 1998 to 2004. She was chairperson of Enterprise Hokitika, and was a founding member and treasurer of the Chrissy Witoko Memorial Trust. For twelve years Grant was a community representative on Work and Income New Zealand's Benefit Review Committee for the West Coast. She has also served on the Human Rights Review Tribunal.

Grant suggested to the Westland District Council in 2014 that the Westland Pioneers' Memorial should be restored and relocated. Some members of the community took exception to the relocation and Grant endured a hate campaign over several years, including social media posts deadnaming her. Grant took a civil prosecution against two people, and they were ordered to remove the posts, apologise and pay costs.

Grant opened the Sock World sock museum and shop in Hokitika. The oldest machine is from 1803, and there are about 100 machines in the museum. Grant has fostered more than 75 young people.

In 2019, Grant spoke at an event with Brian Tamaki, aimed at reducing division between Destiny Church and the gay community. Tamaki had previously blamed gay people for causing earthquakes. Grant wanted to donate her speaker's fee to Rainbow Youth, but they declined it.

Grant unsuccessfully stood for Mayor of Westland at the 2025 local elections. Progress results indicated that she led Helen Lash, the incumbent mayor, by 64 votes. When preliminary results were released the following day, Grant's margin had decreased to four votes. Final results released on 16 October confirmed that Grant had lost to Lash by a margin of eight votes.

== Honours and awards ==
In the 1998 New Year Honours, Grant was appointed a Member of the New Zealand Order of Merit, for services to the community. In the 2018 Queen's Birthday Honours, she was promoted to Officer of same order, also for services to the community.
