= Mark Sorenson (softball) =

New Zealand softball player

Mark James Sorenson MNZM (born c. 1968) is a former New Zealand softball player and current New Zealand men's softball team coach. He captained the national side, the Black Sox from 1989 to 2001, and again in 2004, and led them to three successive ISF world championship wins, in 1996, 2000, and 2004. He retired in 2007 and is considered one of the greatest softball players of all time.

He attended Naenae College.

In the 1998 New Year Honours, Sorenson was appointed a Member of the New Zealand Order of Merit, for services to softball and the community. In 2010, he was inducted into the International Softball Congress Hall of Fame.

He was inducted into the New Zealand Sports Hall of Fame at the 2016 Halberg Awards.

Mark Sorenson is the Central Region Manager for AWF (2016).
