= Liz Jamieson-Hastings =

New Zealand drug and alcohol educator

Liz Jamieson-Hastings CNZM
- Died: 20 November 2022
- Awards: Companion of the New Zealand Order of Merit

Elizabeth Anne Seaton Jamieson-Hastings CNZM (1944 – 20 November 2022 née Merritt) was a New Zealand addiction counsellor and writer, and founder of the Substance Abuse Education Trust. In 1998 Jamieson-Hastings was appointed a Companion of the New Zealand Order of Merit for services to drug and alcohol education.

== Early life and education ==
Jamieson-Hastings was born in Petersfield, England in 1944 and moved to Auckland, New Zealand with her parents. Her father Frederick Ernest Roy Merrit was a New Zealander, and worked for H. T. Merritt, a carpet importing company founded by his grandfather. Jamieson-Hastings mother was Josephine Anne Watson. Jamieson-Hastings attended Hilltop School in Auckland and Woodford House School in Havelock North.

== Life ==
Jamieson-Hastings was an anorexic, a bulimic and an alcoholic by the age of 21. Jamieson-Hastings then became involved in drug and alcohol rehabilitation. She trained as a councillor and educator with the United States Navy, and taught at the University of Arizona. Returning to New Zealand, Jamieson-Hastings founded the Substance Abuse Education Trust in 1988. She worked with prisoners in the maximum-security area of Paremoremo Prison, and in schools.

In 2009, when she was in her sixties, Jamieson-Hastings wrote an autobiography Still Standing: From Debutante to Detox, published by HarperCollins.

After her death on 20 November 2022, Jamieson-Hasting's estate was auctioned for the benefit of drug and alcohol treatment and advisory groups.

== Awards and honours ==
In the 1998 New Year Honours Jamieson-Hastings was appointed a Companion of the New Zealand Order of Merit for services to drug and alcohol education.
