= Beca Group =

New Zealand engineering company

Beca Group Limited
- Type: Private
- Industry: Professional Services Consultancy
- Founded: 1920
- Founder: Arthur Gray
- Headquarters: Auckland
- Number of locations: 25
- Area served: Asia-Pacific
- Key people: Amelia Linzey (CEO)
- Revenue: NZD $541.2 million (2018)
- Number of employees: 4,300
- Website: www.beca.com

Beca (officially Beca Group Limited) is one of the largest employee-owned professional services consultancy firms in the Asia-Pacific region. The company has more than 4,300 staff working across 25 offices around the globe, with headquarters located in Auckland, New Zealand.

== History ==
Beca was founded in 1920 by Arthur Gray on his return to New Zealand after World War I, where he purchased an engineering practice that would later become Gray and Watts, then Gray Watts & Beca. A merger with Wellington firm Hollings & Ferner in 1968 formed Beca, Carter, Hollings & Ferner, with the firm eventually known simply as Beca.

The company's name reflects the contribution of George Beca, CBE, DFC, D.Eng (Hon) (1921–2001), who joined the partnership of Gray and Watts in the early 1950s and led the firm for many years. Beca has had several name changes following amalgamations. Beca Steven existed from 1989 to 2001 after amalgamation of Beca Carter Hollings & Ferner with Steven Fitzmaurice & Partners.

=== Earthquake Engineering ===
Beca has a reputation in earthquake engineering. John Hollings (founding partner of Hollings & Ferner) is regarded as the 'father of capacity design', with his design for the Jerningham Apartment building in Wellington (completed in 1968) demonstrating the 'strong columns, weak beams' design philosophy that is the foundation for modern earthquake resilience in structures and features in almost all international seismic design codes.

The company was the engineer for the world's first base isolated structure: the South Rangitikei Viaduct, a 78 metre high, 315 metres long concrete railway viaduct completed in 1981, where the piers can 'step' up to 13cm off their foundations under earthquake loads, dissipating the earthquake's energy without causing any major structural damage.

More recently, Beca's seismic retrofit work has been recognised with major international structural engineering awards, including the retrospective base isolation of lift shafts at Victoria University of Wellington's Rankine Brown Library and seismic retrofit of 8 Willis Street, an office building in central Wellington.

== See also ==
- Sir Ron Carter, former chairman of Beca
