= 1998 New Year Honours (New Zealand) =

Annual awards for New Zealanders

- Previous: 1997 Queen's Birthday Honours; Next: 1998 Queen's Birthday Honours
- Type: New Zealand royal honours: Order of New Zealand; New Zealand Order of Merit; Queen's Service Order; Queen's Service Medal
- Date: 31 December 1997
- Country: New Zealand
- Total recipients: 173

The 1998 New Year Honours in New Zealand were appointments by Elizabeth II in her right as Queen of New Zealand, on the advice of the New Zealand government, to various orders and honours to reward and highlight good works by New Zealanders, and to celebrate the passing of 1997 and the beginning of 1998. They were announced on 31 December 1997.

The recipients of honours are listed here as they were styled before their new honour.

== Order of New Zealand (ONZ) ==
Ordinary member

- James Brendan Bolger MP – of Wellington.
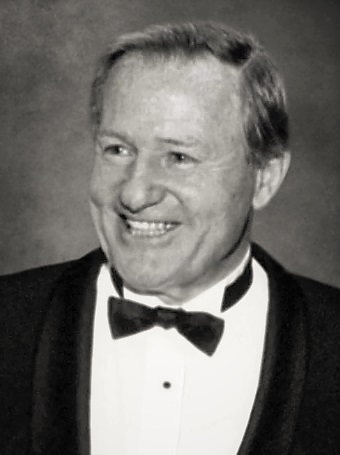
Jim Bolger

== New Zealand Order of Merit ==
=== Dame Companion (DNZM) ===
- Fiona Judith Kidman OBE – of Wellington. For services to literature.
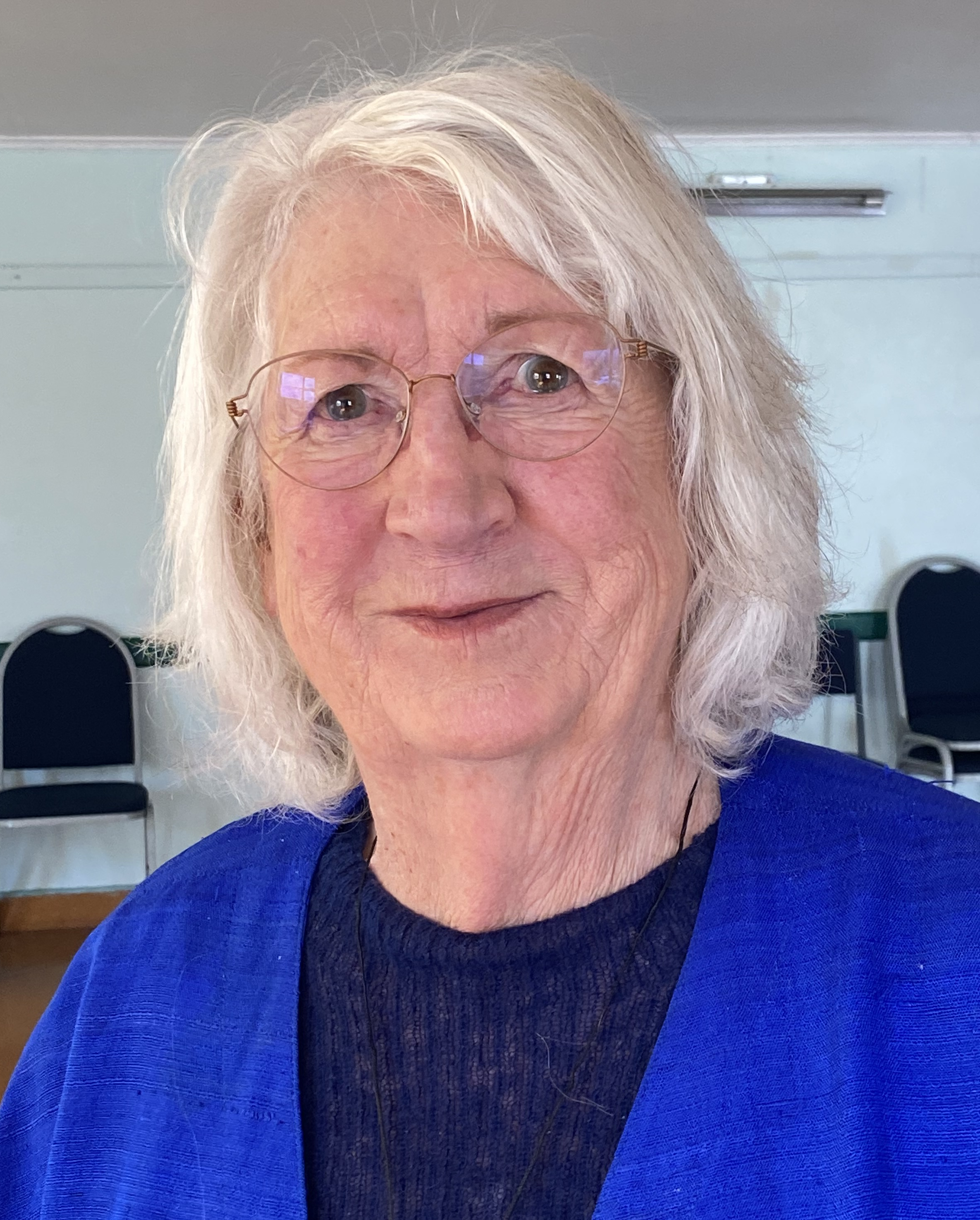
Dame Fiona Kidman

=== Knight Companion (KNZM) ===
- Ronald Powell Carter – of Auckland. For services to engineering and business administration.
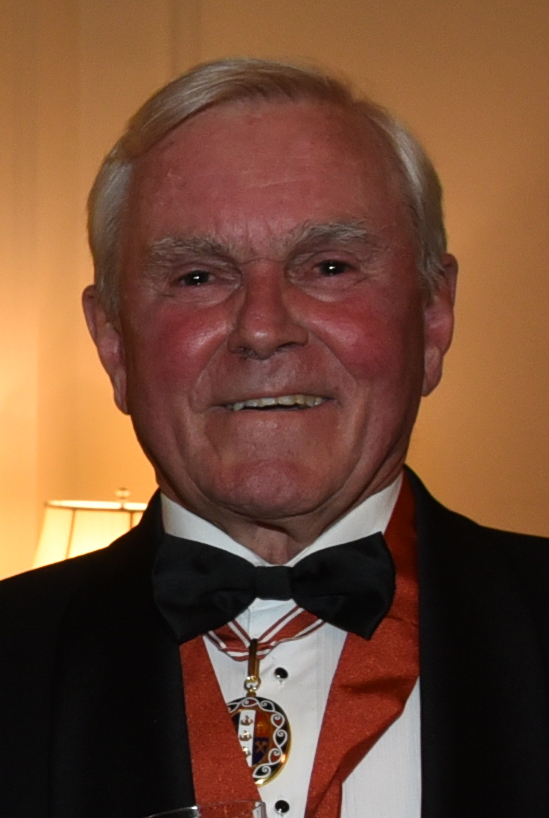
Sir Ron Carter

=== Companion (CNZM) ===
- Joan Maureen Bolger – of Wellington. For services to the community.
- Judith Clark – of Wellington. For services to music.
- Charles McNeill Gordon – of Northland. For services to the dairy industry.
- Dr David Templeton Gray – of Auckland. For services to youth and medicine.
- Elizabeth Anne Seaton Jamieson – of Auckland. For services to drug and alcohol education.
- Wallace George Lowe OBE – of Derby, United Kingdom. For services to New Zealand interests in the United Kingdom.
- Hilary Strang McCormack – of Christchurch. For services to the deaf.
- Jennifer Laughton Millar – of Te Puke. For services to equestrian sport.
- Dr Harold William Orsman – of Wellington. For services to lexicography.
- James Wilmot Rowe – of Wellington. For services to economics and the community.
- Professor Emeritus Frederick Thomas Shannon – of Christchurch. For services to paediatrics.
- Dr Teresa Catherine Turnbull – of Katikati. For services to health administration.
- Beatrice Rae Wilson – of South Canterbury. For services to education and the community.
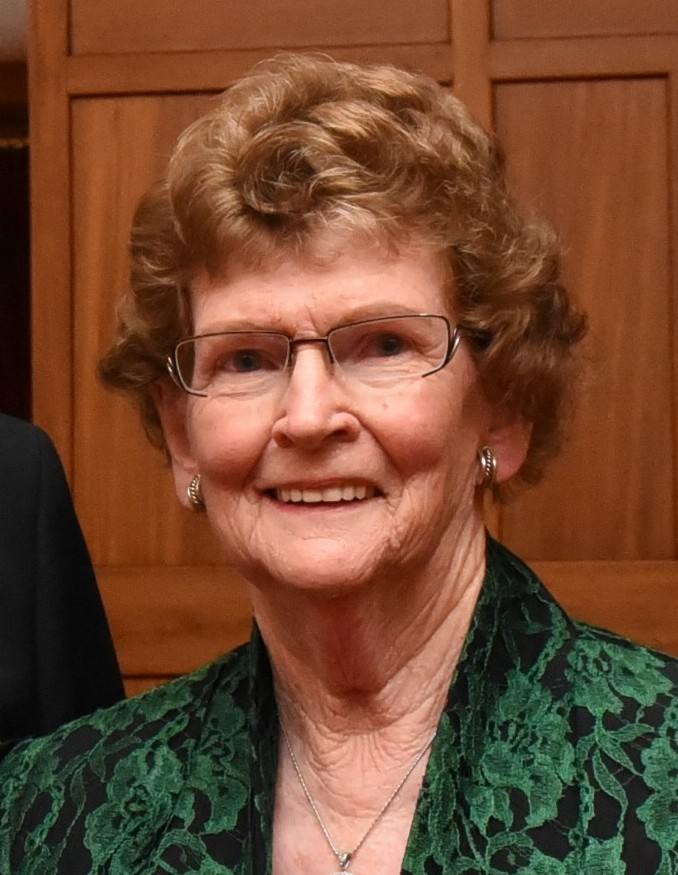
Joan Bolger

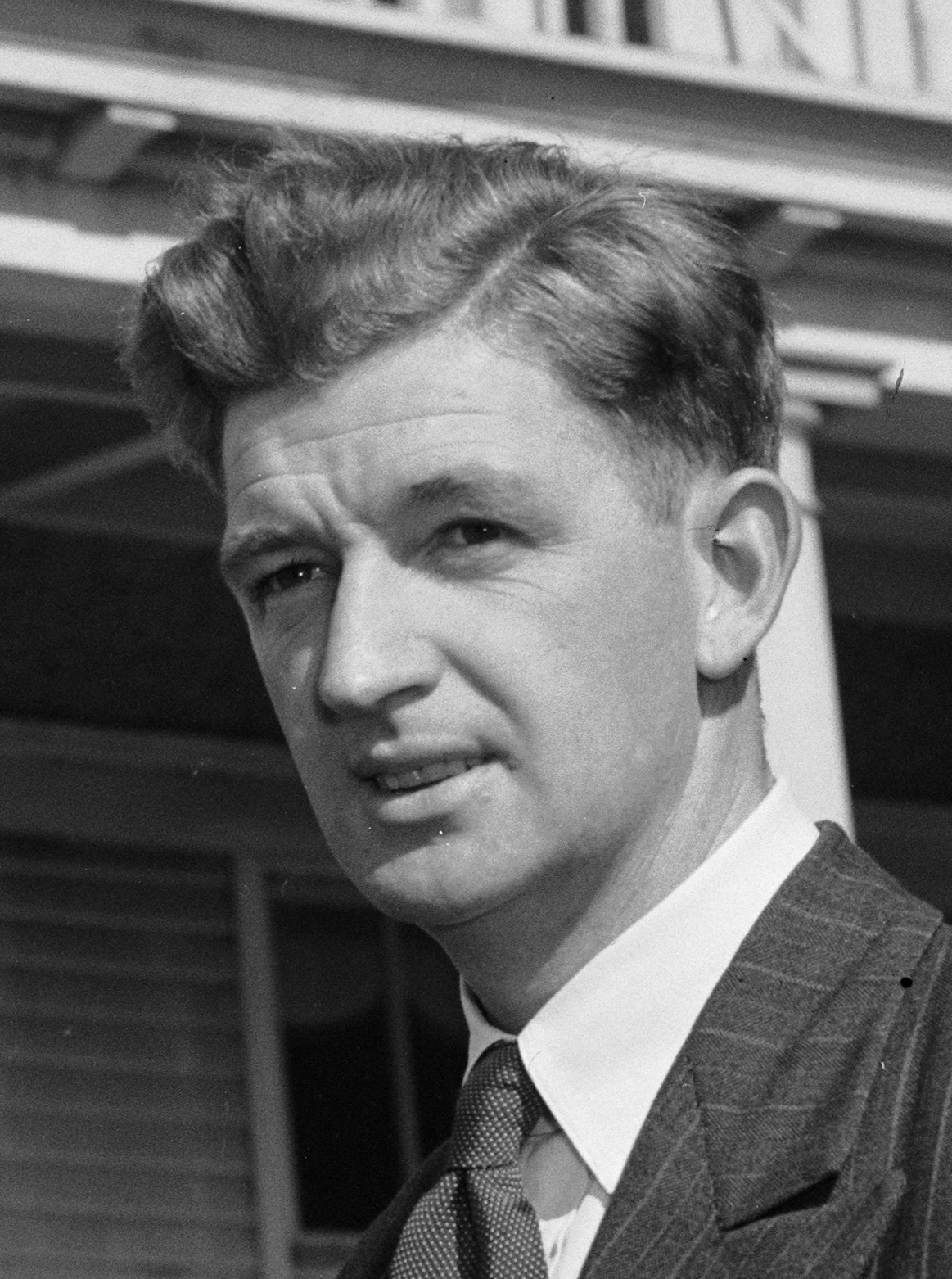
George Lowe

=== Officer (ONZM) ===
- Barbara Margaret Allardyce – of Christchurch. For services to the community.
- Sidney Boyd Ashton – of Christchurch. For services to Māori and the community.
- Dr Richard John Holden Bollard – of Seattle, United States of America. For services to New Zealand interests in the United States of America.
- Patricia Rosalie Christianson JP – of Upper Hutt. For services to local-body and community affairs.
- James William Ferguson Foreman – of Auckland. For services to manufacturing.
- Annette Mary Gilbert – of Auckland. For services to the Girl Guide movement and the community.
- Borgia Kurupai Hakaraia – of Ōtaki. For services to the community.
- Paul Stanley Harrop – of Auckland. For services to music and the community.
- Donald Roderick Herdman – of Whakatāne. For services to local-body and community affairs.
- Roy William Hewson – of Petone. For services to education and the community.
- Alison Hylton – of Wanganui. For services to the disabled.
- Joan Margaret Jaggar – of Auckland. For services to the sport of bowls.
- Jocelyn Agnes Jarmey – of Christchurch. For services to the community.
- The Reverend Edward Major Marshall – of Whangaparāoa. For services to education and the community.
- Hazel Irene Nash – of Māpua. For services to youth.
- John Desmond O'Connor – of Westport. For services to the community.
- Swea Lenore Ross Raitt – of Blenheim. For services to the community.
- Topsy Stewart Ratahi – of Wellington. For services to the Māori people and the community.
- Toko Renata Te Taniwha – of Coromandel. For services to the community.
- Patricia Robertson – of Rotorua. For services to the community.
- Robert Donald Spary GM – of Arrowtown. For services to aviation and tourism.
- Rodney Douglas Harris Steel – of Christchurch. For services to business and the community.
- Garth Purcell Tapper – of Kaikohe. For service to painting.
- Dr Peter Frederick Wells – of Hamilton. For services to linguistics.
- Alfred Youell – of Coventry, United Kingdom. For services to philanthropy.

Honorary

- Kazumi Nakayama – of Fukuoka, Japan. For services to New Zealand interests in Japan.

=== Member (MNZM) ===
- Warrant Officer Graeme Victor Aldridge – Royal New Zealand Air Force.
- John Stacey Black JP – of Taumarunui. For services to the community.
- Acting Major Wayne Peter Boustridge – Royal New Zealand Army Logistics Regiment.
- Ivan Verdun Bowen – of Rotorua. For services to sheep shearing and tourism.
- Commander Graeme Walter John Briggs VRD – Royal New Zealand Naval Volunteer Reserve.
- Lieutenant Colonel Anne Catherine Campbell – Royal New Zealand Army Medical Corps.
- Patricia Helena Berdina Chitty – of Waiuku. For services to the community.
- Hazel Margaret Christie – of Invercargill. For services to music.
- Constantine (Costa) Cotsilinis – of Athens, Greece. For services to New Zealand interests in Greece.
- David Alexander Dalgleish – of Auckland. For services to rugby and the community.
- The Reverend Canon David Sing Hiong Dang JP – of Auckland. For services to the community.
- John Lewis Dobbie – of Hamilton. For services to farming.
- May Eileen Earles – of Auckland. For services to the community.
- Stanley Florence JP – of New Plymouth. For services to the dairy industry and the community.
- Wing Commander Athol James Forrest – Royal New Zealand Air Force.
- John Campbell (Jock) Graham – of Auckland. For services to journalism and the wine industry.
- Jacqueline Grant – of Dobson. For services to the community.
- Ian Ernest Greenwood – of Wellington. For services to surf lifesaving and the community.
- Group Captain Murray James Heyrick – Royal New Zealand Air Force.
- Jean Margaret Hill JP – of Hastings. For services to health administration and the community.
- John Himiona Hunia JP – of Te Teko. For services to the community.
- Nora Patricia Hurley – of New Plymouth. For services to education.
- Cynthia Ruth Landels – of Auckland. For services to Girl Guides.
- Dr Richard George Lawrence – of Te Aroha. For services to the community.
- Jean Elizabeth Lewis – of Timaru. For services to the community.
- Edna Jean Low – of Methven. For services to the community.
- Norman Duncan McKenzie McRae – of Wyndham. For services to the meat industry.
- Laurence (Laurie) William Mains – of Mosgiel. For services to rugby.
- Dr The Honourable Clive Denby Matthewson – of Dunedin. For public services as a Member of Parliament.
- Wing Commander Stephen John Moore – Royal New Zealand Air Force.
- Warrant Officer Class One Brian Walter Ngata – Royal Regiment of New Zealand Artillery.
- Patricia Jean Park JP – of Dunedin. For services to the community.
- Cecily Naomi (Billie) Reading – of Wellington. For services to the community.
- David Dawson Reyburn – of Whangārei. For services to the community.
- Lewis Milner Robinson – of Wanganui. For services to the community.
- Lucy Ruiha Ruri JP – of Murupara. For services to the community.
- Corporal David Alexander Ryan – New Zealand Special Air Service.
- Douglas Leslie Shaw JP – of Auckland. For services to swimming.
- Gillian Kathleen Mary Smith – of Auckland. For services to the disabled.
- Mark James Sorenson – of Lower Hutt. For services to softball and the community.
- Alexandra (Sandy) Stephens – of Nelson. For services to overseas development programmes.
- Lieutenant Commander Mark Ian Ternent – Royal New Zealand Navy.
- Peter Arthur Trevor Thomas JP – of North Shore City. For services to local-body and community affairs.
- Grenfell Raymore Thurston – of Ruawai. For services to local-body and community affairs.
- Blossom Matiriama Tropman – of Wellington. For services to the community.

Additional

- Chief Petty Officer Communications Analyst Thomas Michael Allen – Royal New Zealand Navy.
- Lieutenant Simon Oscar Rooke – Royal New Zealand Navy.
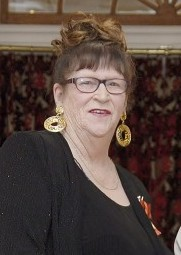
Jacquie Grant

== Companion of the Queen's Service Order (QSO) ==
=== For community service ===
- Muriel Gladys Barkman JP – of Dunedin.
- The Reverend Richard Newman Buttle JP – of Auckland.
- Tanira Gladding Fraser JP – of Tokoroa.
- Aldyth Mary Guthrey – of Christchurch.
- Peter Lewis Harris – of Napier.
- Karaka Roberts – of Dunedin.
- Sheila Sykes – of Palmerston North.

=== For public services ===
- Bruce Macdonald Brown – of Wellington.
- John Ralph Anderson Chaffey JP – of North Canterbury.
- Catherine Rosalie Gibson – of Ōtaki.
- Barbara Mary O'Kane JP – of Cromwell.
- Isabelle Mary Sherrard – of Auckland.
- Margaret Lilian Swift – of Pukekohe.
- Judge William John Martin Treadwell – of Wanganui.

== Queen's Service Medal (QSM) ==
=== For community service ===
- Debbie AnnMarie Anderson – of Lower Hutt.
- Marie Boal – of Leeston.
- Jennifer Box – of Dunedin.
- Nita Clark – of New Plymouth.
- Ethel Maude Collins – of Blenheim.
- Edith Gladys Leslie Coxshall – of Ashburton.
- Hilda Margaret Davidson – of Winton
- Alfred Douglas Dibley – lately of Rotorua. (Note: Deceased 18 December 1997. Her Majesty's approval to this award was signified before the date of death.)
- Donald Thomas Donaldson JP – of Palmerston North.
- Isobel Elsie Fraser Donaldson – of Northland.
- Pat James Gill – of Lower Hutt.
- William Martin Innes – of Dunedin.
- Bryan Eric Jacobsen – of New Plymouth.
- Lorraine Rose Jacobsen – of New Plymouth.
- Arthur Henry (Mick) Jellyman – of Blenheim.
- John Johnston – of Whakatāne.
- Eleanor Jane Leckie – of Dunedin.
- Vicki Janeen Lowrie – of Auckland.
- Mary Imelda Mackle – of Auckland.
- Michael Ronald Mapperson – of Auckland.
- Evelyn Mary Maxwell – of North Shore City.
- Gordon Neil Nuttall – of Christchurch.
- Jessie Joyce O'Brien – of Whakatāne.
- Allan Stanley Parker – of Gisborne.
- Ruth Clara Philburn – of Ngāruawāhia.
- Daphne Emmeline Regan – of Whakatāne.
- Jack Roderick – of Gisborne.
- Valerie Jessie Scott JP – of Wellington.
- Phyllis Maud Topp – of South Auckland.
- Mary Page Walker – of Ōpōtiki.
- Eric Ngametua Wichman-Ngau – of Auckland.
- Barbara Makare Williams – of Auckland.
- Te Hira Paraone (Brownie) Williams – of Auckland.
- Richard Yates – of Christchurch.

=== For public services ===
- Cicely Jean Bibby – of Mount Maunganui.
- Douglas Brew – of Palmerston North; detective inspector, New Zealand Police.
- Samuel Mita Carter – of Featherston.
- Hazel Doris Chapman – of Hamilton.
- Bruce Chilton – of Invercargill.
- Reginald Gerald Dawkins – of Picton.
- Dr Owen William Lee Dine – of Napier.
- Joyce Emma Douglas – of Levin.
- Ralph Oliver Gillespie – of Blenheim; lately senior constable, New Zealand Police.
- Dorothy Caroline Grant – of Auckland.
- Lenore Hart – of Bluff.
- Wendy Faye Hawkings – of Warkworth.
- Pamela Elizabeth Heath – of Auckland.
- Lorna Hughes – of London, United Kingdom.
- David Stanley Jecks – of Cambridge.
- Dr Bryan George Jew – of Rotorua.
- Mohammad Tauqir Khan JP – of Auckland.
- Carolyn Olive McLellan – of Nelson.
- John Malcolm – of Auckland; lately station officer, Birkenhead Volunteer Fire Brigade, New Zealand Fire Service.
- Gary Frederick Nation – of Pahiatua; chief fire officer, Pahiatua Volunteer Fire Brigade, New Zealand Fire Service.
- Frank Anthony Neate JP – of Nelson.
- David Bryan John Painter BEM – of Upper Hutt; lately senior sergeant, New Zealand Police.
- Ihipera Palmer – of Rotorua.
- Rex Douglas Patrick – of Hamilton; chief fire officer, Waikato Area Operations Centre, New Zealand Fire Service.
- The Reverend Robert Logan Peck – of Raetihi.
- Gustave Marie Willem Frans Porteners – of Porirua.
- Robert Eric Sincock – of Kaiapoi.
- Sharon Lee Stewart – of Auckland.
- Brian Russell Tegg – of Piopio.
- Peter Murray Thompson – of Wellington; lately senior sergeant, New Zealand Police.
- Thomas Thompson JP – of Kaponga.
- Beverley Joy Tonks – of Wellington.
- Margaret Trotter – of Invercargill.
- Leonardine Veronica Van Der Sluis JP – of Orewa.
- William Joseph Walker – of Christchurch.
- Henry William Kennedy Watson – of Tuakau.
