= Ron Carter (businessman) =

New Zealand businessman

Sir Ron Carter ONZ KNZM
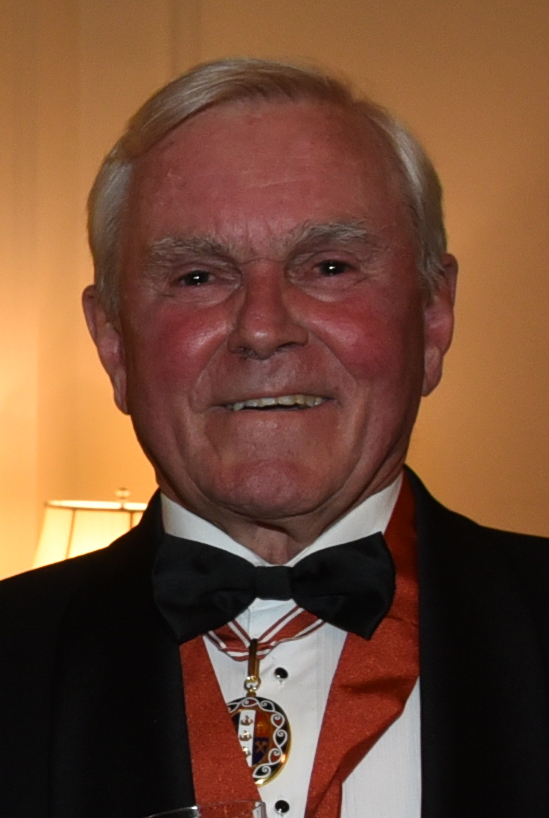
- Carter in 2016
- Born: Ronald Powell Carter; 17 June 1935 (age 91); Auckland, New Zealand
- Education: University of Auckland
- Occupation: Civil engineer
- Spouse: Dianne Lewell Oxspring

Sir Ronald Powell Carter ONZ KNZM (born 17 June 1935) is a retired New Zealand businessman.

== Early life and family ==
Carter was born in Auckland in 1935, the son of Sybil Muriel (née Townsend) and Eric Powell Carter, a mechanic. He was educated at Auckland Grammar School from 1948. In 2013 he described his time at the school: "In all my days at school, although I was in a high-achieving class, I did not cross the platform once in my five years at Auckland Grammar to receive a class or a subject prize."

Carter then attended Auckland University College, graduating in 1958 with a Master of Engineering degree in civil engineering. His thesis was titled The effect of stress on the longitudinal wave velocity of an ultrasonic pulse in concrete.

== Beca Group ==
Carter joined Beca, an engineering company, in 1959, becoming a partner in 1965 and managing director in 1986. He was chairman of the Beca group until 2002.

== Corporate governance and other roles ==
Carter has been a member, director or chairperson of many boards, including:

- Founding chairman of the Civil Aviation Authority (1992–98)
- National Infrastructure Advisory Board
- Electricity Corporation of New Zealand
- Association of Consulting Engineers New Zealand
- Air New Zealand (1998–2007)
- Trust Power Limited
- Aetna
- Sir Peter Blake Trust (until 2011)
- Chair of the Selection Panel for the Sir Peter Blake Leadership Awards
- Patron of the Committee For Auckland
- Developed and co-founded the Iwi Business Consortium in 2009
- Royal Commission of Inquiry into the Christchurch earthquakes
- Independent representative to the Board of the 2011 Rugby World Cup
- Director Rural Equities Ltd.

== Honours ==
Carter was appointed a Knight Companion of the New Zealand Order of Merit, for services to engineering and business administration, in the 1998 New Year Honours, and made a member of the Order of New Zealand in the 2014 Queen's Birthday Honours.

In 2001, he was awarded an honorary doctorate in engineering by the University of Auckland.

Carter has also received the following honours:

- 1997 – Distinguished Fellow of IPENZ 1997
- 2009 – Inducted into the New Zealand Business Hall of Fame
- 2010 – KEA World Class Leader for work in business and finance 2010
