= Van Asch College =

Van Asch Deaf Education Centre
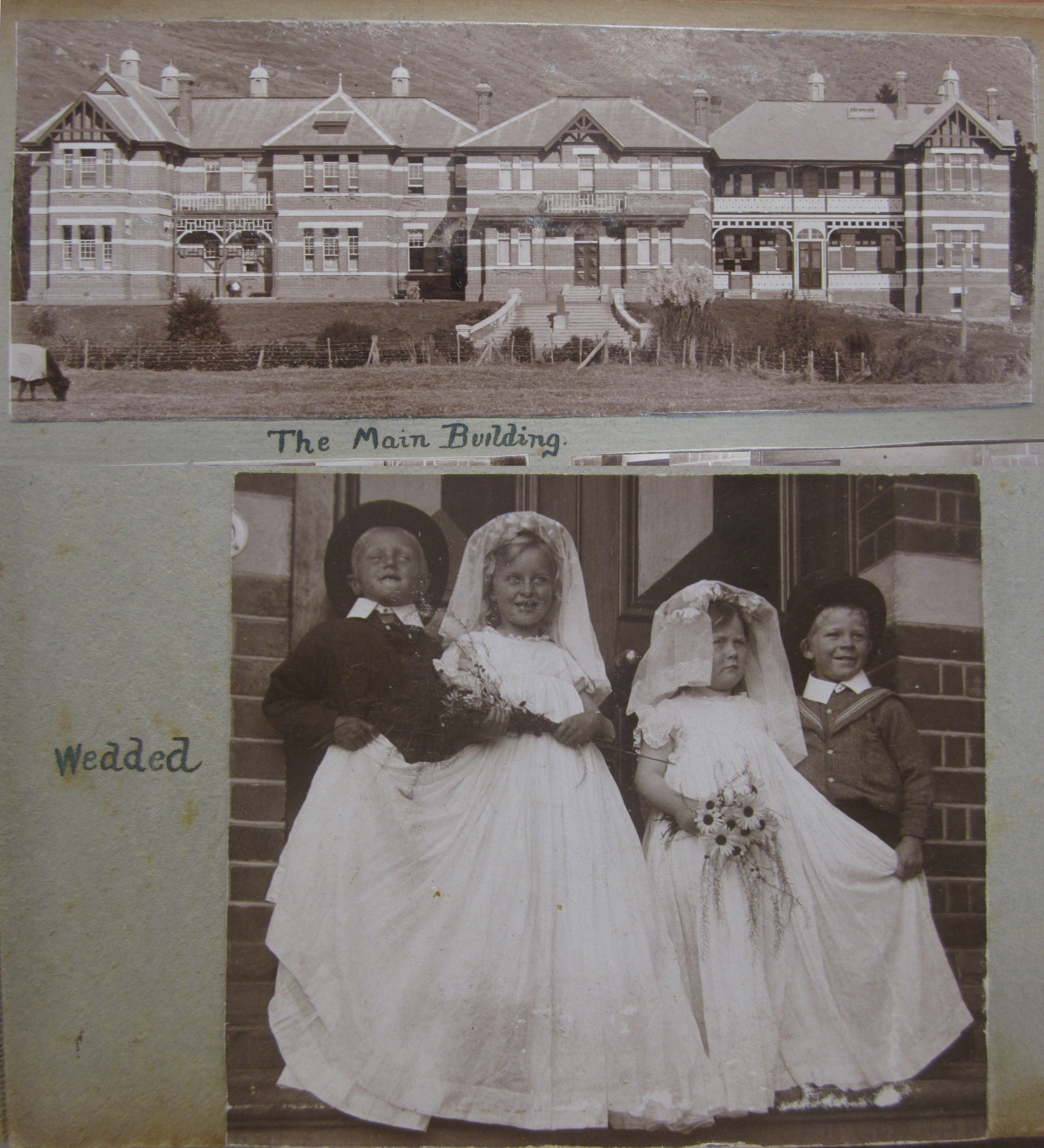

Location
- Truro Street, Christchurch, New Zealand; 43°34′47″S 172°45′32″E

Information
- Type: State, Co-educational special school
- Established: 1880
- Ministry of Education Institution no.: 519
- Principal: Bernie Mulcahy-Bouwman
- Enrolment: 26
- Socio-economic decile: 4
- Website: www.vanasch.school.nz

Van Asch Deaf Education Centre was located in Truro Street, Sumner, Christchurch, New Zealand. It was a special school for deaf children, accepting both day and residential pupils, as well being as a resource centre providing services and support for parents, mainstream students and their teachers in the South Island and the Lower North Island (south of Taupō).

The school was founded in 1880. Formerly called the Sumner Deaf and Dumb Institution, Sumner Institution for Deaf-Mutes and Sumner School for the Deaf, the school was renamed in its centenary year as van Asch College in honour of its first Principal, Gerrit van Asch.

In 2019, the New Zealand government decided to merge the school with Kelston Deaf Education Centre in Auckland to form one national school. This national school was named Ko Taku Reo.

== History ==
Prior to 1877, there was no state assistance for educating deaf children in New Zealand. Wealthy parents could send their deaf children to schools for the deaf either in Australia or England or else privately hire a teacher to come out to New Zealand. Dorcas Mitchell was one such teacher who had trained in England to teach in sign language and then come to New Zealand to teach the four deaf children of Rev. Bradley, at Charteris Bay, in Lyttelton Harbour, certainly before 1870.

On 29 November 1877, the New Zealand House of Representatives enacted the Education Act 1877, which provided for free primary education for all children aged between 5 and 15 in New Zealand from 1 January 1878. Education was compulsory for non-Māori children between 7 and 13 but exceptions could be made for sickness or infirmity and children could be expelled for disruptive behaviour.

=== Establishment ===
William Rolleston, when he represented the Avon electorate in 1878, proposed a school for deaf children in Parliament. The motion was agreed and the Government agreed to add funds to the supplementary estimates to establish an Institution for the deaf in Christchurch. This was the first time in the world a government had funded a residential school for educating people who were deaf, so could not speak.

=== Recruitment of a teacher ===
In November 1878, Sir George Grey, Colonial Secretary, wrote to Julius Vogel, then the Agent-General for New Zealand, in London, to recruit a suitable teacher from England. Upon seeing news of this correspondence in the Lyttelton Times, Dorcas Mitchell wrote to Grey seeking appointment and indicating she had intended to establish her own school for deaf-mutes. The Secretary of Education, John Hislop, visited Miss Mitchell in Lyttelton in March 1879 to see her proposed school, which he thought unsuitable. It soon became apparent that the school would be also be associated with an orphanage, which Rolleston felt was not what Parliament intended. Nevertheless, in June 1879, the Government assisted Miss Mitchell investigate other possibilities in Dunedin and Oamaru.

=== Appointment of the first director ===
In June 1879, Vogel informed Grey that Gerrit van Asch had been selected as the institution's first director. Van Asch, who was born in 1836 and had been specially trained in Holland and Germany in the Pure Oral method, before moving to England in 1859 to establish private schools for educating deaf mutes by spoken language and lip-reading only. The commissioners reported he was the only applicant, of seventeen, who was trained in the German system system, teaching lip-reading, speech, writing and reading concurrently. They also noted he also spoke English "without an accent". Of the other applicants, the commissioners reported that 12 men were trained to teach with sign, and 3 men had no special training. (No mention was made of the abilities or gender of the remaining applicant.) He emigrated to New Zealand in October 1879 and selected the Sumner site temporarily, with intentions to move to a larger population center in the future.

=== Commencement ===
The Institution for the Deaf and Dumb opened for "training and instruction of deaf-mutes" in Sumner on 10 March 1880. By June 1880, the school had 10 students and grew to have 37 students, including one from Australia, as well as 4 teachers, by the end of 1885. From January 1886, the Institution for Deaf-Mutes, as it was by then known as, leased "Sumner College", a large five-year-old building that had been erected as a boarding school by Mr. C. L. Wiggins, in order to accommodate its growing roll. From the beginning Van Asch was enthusiastic to demonstrate his teaching methods to the many visitors to the school and they were amazed by the results. In his response to the 1886 report, the Minister of Education observed that the "deaf are seldom dumb". In 1888, an assistant teacher from the Sumner Institution, who was visiting schools for the deaf in other countries to see their teaching methods, was giving evidence before a Royal Commission into the Education of Deaf-Mutes, in London.

=== Compulsory attendance ===
The School Attendance Act 1901, which was enacted on 7 November 1901, required children who were deaf or blind be given "efficient and suitable" education between the ages of seven and sixteen. Parents who could not do so were obliged to send their children to an "Institution" that the Minister of Education directed the child attend. The requirements were carried forward into the 1904 consolidation and reprint of the Education Act. In practice, this required parents to enrol their deaf children at the Sumner institution, or else educate them privately and at their own expense.

=== Retirement of the first Director ===
Director van Asch retired at the end of March 1906. Miss van Asch, his daughter, who had taught at the school for 17 years also retired.

=== School for the Deaf ===
At the end of his report for the 1907 year, the new director, J. E. Stephens, observed that the school's official title was misleading and requested that "The School for the Deaf" be used instead.

In 1958, the Boys' House was burnt down in the early hours of the morning.

The old main building was centred near the hills and Evans Pass.

=== Oralist beginnings ===
The Milan Congress of September 1880 resolved it was best to use Oral education for the deaf. Although this method of deaf education was not universally supported, with some British and American educators of a contrary opinion. In 1980, the 15th International Congress on the Education of the Deaf (ICED) held in Hamburg, West Germany, repudiated 1880 resolutions.

Oral education persisted up until the late 1970s, the philosophy of the school was to prevent the students from using sign language (now New Zealand's third official language). Children were taught exclusively via oral methods, forcing them to learn to lipread and speak, with punishments being given for use of sign language.

Nevertheless, school student also acquired sign language from some of the adult support staff, who were also deaf, as well as older pupils and their peers in various social settings away from the classroom and not supervised by their teachers.

=== Mainstreaming ===
From 1966, some deaf students were educated in a deaf classroom at Sumner School, the nearby state primary school with the intent of socializing deaf student into a hearing school and familiarising students of the two schools with each other. The inter-change of students and teachers between the two schools continued in the 1970s and 1980s and was considered a positive experience by teachers but extremely challenging for students, both deaf and hearing.

=== Bilingual teaching ===
In the late 1970s, the school switched to bilingual teaching and currently, in addition to presenting the curriculum in NZSL, Sign Supported English and oral (aural) modes, the college now offers the facility for deaf and hard of hearing students being educated in mainstream settings to learn about NZSL as part of a Deaf Studies curriculum.

=== 2011 Christchurch earthquakes ===
After the Christchurch earthquakes in February and June 2011 made the old Redcliffs School site unsafe, the van Asch Deaf Education Centre hosted the 400 pupils and staff for nine years pending a decision to close or rebuild that school. Eventually a new site was found and the school building were rebuilt in Redcliffs Park on Beachville Road, across the road from the original site, and the school moved to its new site on 22 June 2020.

=== Merger ===
In 2012 the Boards of Trustees of the van Asch Deaf Education Centre and Kelston Deaf Education Centre combined to become a single board running both schools. On 9 April 2019, as a result of a request by the Combined Board of both schools, the Minister of Education announced that van Asch Deaf Education Centre and Kelston Deaf Education Centre would merge in 2020 at the beginning of the third term and become one national school to support more than 2700 deaf or hard of hearing children and students up to the age of 21 in the New Zealand Education system. In 2020, van Asch became a residential campus and support centre for Ko Taku Reo.

== Deaf staff ==
The employment of deaf gardeners, cooks and cleaners has been credited with having a significant effect on the transmission of signs between generations, with children picking up signs the auxiliary staff used to communicate with each other, despite disapproval from teaching staff.

In 1992 the Board of Trustees had its first deaf chairperson.

In 1993 the first Sign Language tutor was employed.

In 1997 the first deaf teacher was employed.

== Notable people ==
Notable people associated with the college include rugby player Patrick Harvey, who taught at the school, and Deaf community advocate Hilary McCormack, who was a boarder for a year, and later was chair of the Board of Trustees.
