= Stuart and Chapman's bush tramway =

Coordinates: 42.807011°S 170.944217°E

Stuart and Chapman's bush tramway, Rimu
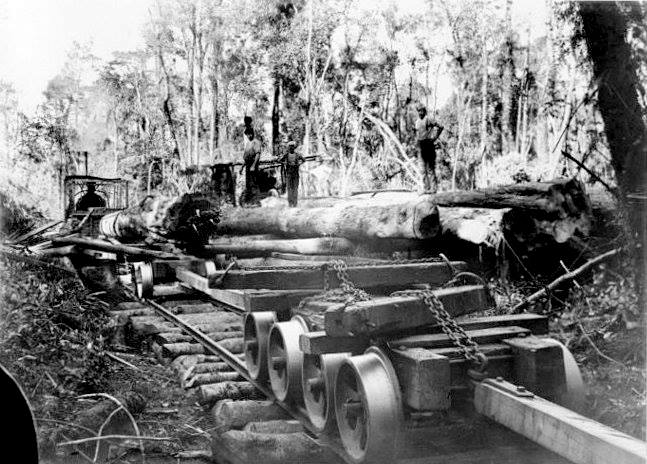
- Logging gang on Stuart and Chapman's bush tramway, Rimu

Technical
- Line length: 20 kilometres (12 miles)
- Track gauge: Probably 2 foot 6 inch (762 mm)

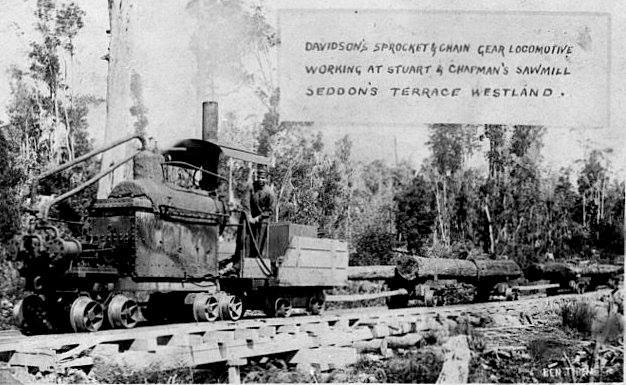
G & D Davidson's sprocket and chain gear locomotive working at Stuart and Chapman's sawmill

Stuart and Chapman's bush tramway was a 20 kilometres (12 mi) long bush tramway with a gauge of probably 2-foot 6-inch (762 mm) at Seddon's Terrace Sawmill in Rimu, New Zealand. It ran south of Ross to the Lake Ianthe area. It was used from at least 1899 to 1962.

== History ==
Seddon's Terrace Sawmill in Rimu was founded by David Patrick Stuart and John Chapman. They started sawmilling in 1899 after they had built their first sawmill at Seddon Terrace. The mill was located about 5 1/2 miles (8.9 km) from Hokitika. The plant comprised a 30 hp boiler, a 16 hp stationary steam engine of sixteen horse-power, Bullock's patent bench, and the usual paraphernalia. The output was 6000 superfeet per day. The timber was carted by road to Hokitika by a contract system. However, timber for local consumption was delivered by the firm's own teams. Fourteen persons were employed.

John Chapman was the manager of the Seddon's Terrace sawmill. He was born in the Canterbury district in 1872, and grew up on a farm. In 1887, he moved to the West Coast, and was engaged in various classes of work, principally mining and sawmilling, and has been connected with sawmill work for more than fifteen years. As a Freemason, he was a member of Lodge Kilwinning, Hokitika. He was married and had two children.

David Patrick Stuart was one of the co-founders of the Seddon's Terrace sawmill at Rimu in 1899 and of the Waitahi Bluff sawmill in 1903. He was subsequently the manager of the Waitaha Bluff sawmill. He was born at Westbury, Tasmania, in 1874. He came to New Zealand with his parents at an early age, and settled at Kumara, where he went to school. Afterwards he engaged in mining, but about 1891 he started work with a local sawmill, and since then he has been employed continuously at sawmill work.

Eventually, their timber-related activities became incorporated into Stuart and Chapman Ltd, whose headquarters were at Ross. The company became a fully owned subsidiary of Fletcher Holdings in 1962.
