= Hilary McCormack =

New Zealand deaf community advocate

Hilary McCormack CNZM
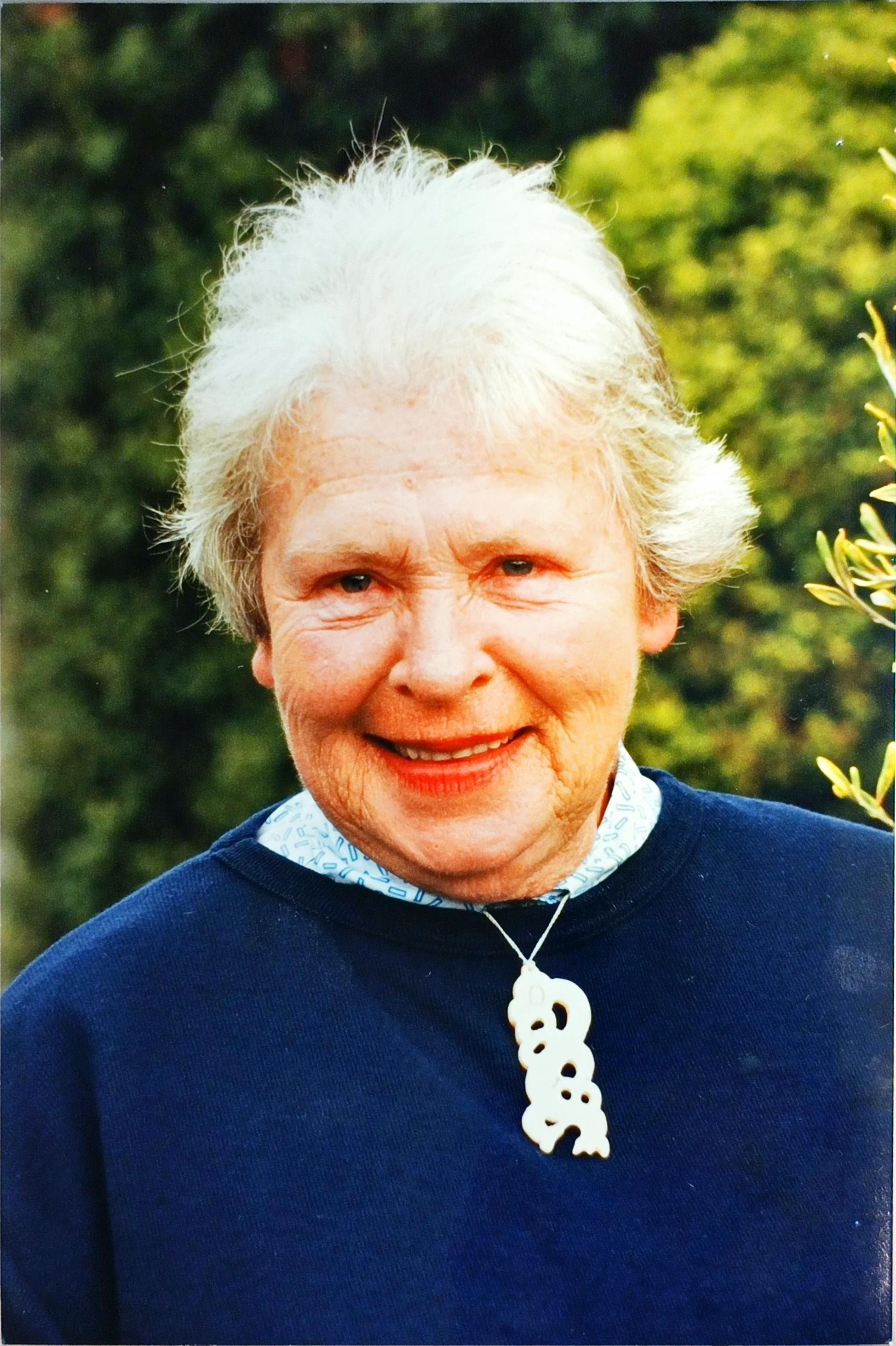
- Born: 31 December 1934
- Died: 12 December 2022
- Education: Van Asch Deaf Education Centre
- Awards: Companion of the New Zealand Order of Merit

Hilary Strang McCormack CNZM (31 December 1934 – 12 December 2022) was a New Zealand advocate for the Deaf community. She was president and patron of the New Zealand Association of the Deaf, and a strong supporter of New Zealand Sign Language. In 1998 McCormack was appointed a Companion of the New Zealand Order of Merit for services to the deaf.

== Early life and education ==
McCormack had meningitis when she was seven, and became totally deaf "almost overnight" as a result. McCormack attended the Sumner School for the Deaf (later Van Asch College), for a year, where she was a weekly boarder and learned to lip read. At that time sign language was not used or taught at the school, so McCormack relied on lipreading and interpreters throughout her life.

== Work ==
Despite not using sign language, McCormack was a strong supporter of New Zealand Sign Language. She led the establishment of the NZSL Dictionary. McCormack also advocated for government funding for a NZ Relay Service, providing relay services for deaf people and people with other communication difficulties.

McCormack was President and Patron of the New Zealand Association of the Deaf. In 1987 she was elected to the executive of the Disabled Person's Assembly, which had been formed in 1983.

McCormack served on the Board of Trustees for Van Asch College and from 1992 to 1993 served as Chair.

== Honours and awards ==
In the 1998 New Year Honours, McCormack was appointed a Companion of the New Zealand Order of Merit for services to the deaf.

In 2020 McCormack was awarded the New Zealand Sign Language Awards' Supreme Long-standing Service Award.

McCormack was awarded life membership of the Canterbury Deaf Society.
