= Patrick Harvey (rugby union, born 1880) =

New Zealand rugby union player (1880–1949)

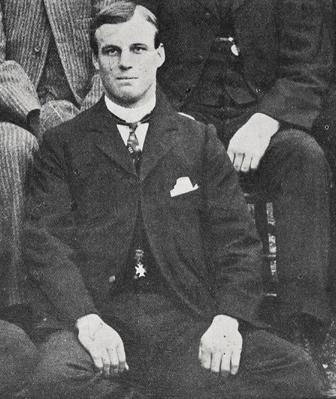
- Harvey in 1904
- Born: Patrick Harvey; 3 April 1880 Rakaia, New Zealand
- Died: 29 October 1949 (aged 69) Christchurch, New Zealand
- Occupation: Special needs teacher

Rugby union career
- Position: Halfback
Amateur team(s)
| Years | Team | Apps | (Points) |
- Chertsey
| – | Rakaia | | |
| – | Christchurch | | |
Provincial / State sides
| Years | Team | Apps | (Points) |
| 1900–1904 | Canterbury | | |
International career
| Years | Team | Apps | (Points) |
| 1904 | New Zealand | 1 | (0) |

Patrick "Peter" Harvey (3 April 1880 – 29 October 1949) was a New Zealand rugby union player who represented the All Blacks in 1904. His position of choice was halfback.

== Career ==
Born in South Rakaia, Harvey played Rugby union for the Chertsey football club as well as the Rakaia football club.

In 1900, he transferred to the Christchurch rugby club coming in as a 20-year-old. He worked his way up through ranks and within his first season Harvey found himself representing Canterbury playing in the final four matches as a five-eighth.

He was described as "a small nuggety man, whose best quality was defense. He used the line repeatedly, saving his forwards all the time and possessed cover defense of rare quality".

In 1903 Harvey was selected for the national side on their tour of Australia. Unfortunately Harvey could not gain work leave and had to decline. At the team's farewell the New Zealand prime minister at the time (Richard Seddon), stated: "it is with extreme regret that the Government has been unable to grant leave to Mr. Harvey".

A year later Harvey was able to make his long-awaited All Black debut, against the touring Great Britain side. This was the first All Black test played at home. The match was won 9–3.

He was further chosen for the famous Original All Blacks tour, but again, he could not obtain work leave and had to stay in the country.

He was a regular in the Canterbury side until 1904.

Harvey then became a Canterbury selector.

== Teaching ==
Harvey taught at the Sumner School for the Deaf (now known as Van Asch College). At the time he was the only tutor in the country capable of the roll. If this wasn't the case Harvey would've most likely gained some leave to go on the All Black tours he was selected for.

== Awards ==
As the Christchurch rugby club celebrated their 150th jubilee in 2013, the club released an all-time XV. Harvey made the fantasy side as the Halfback.
