= Lake Ianthe =

Lake in New Zealand

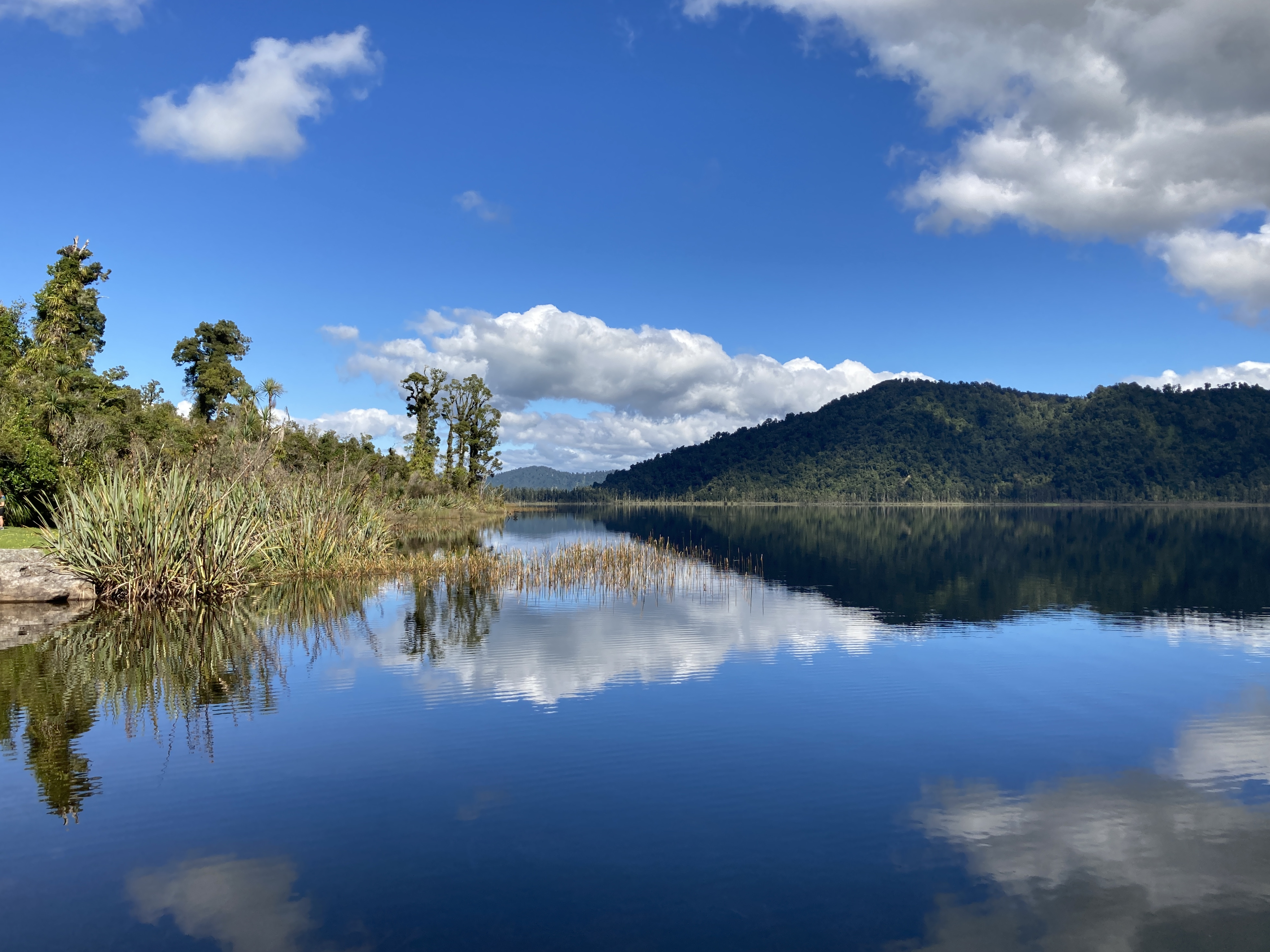
- Lake Ianthe

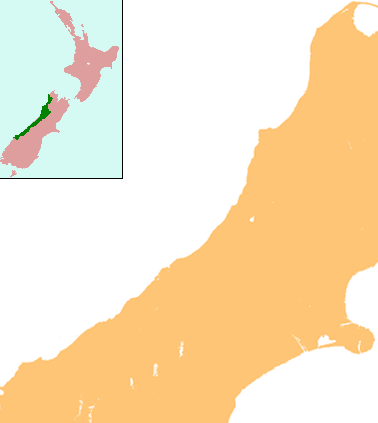
- Location within West Coast
- Interactive map of Lake Ianthe
- Location: Westland District, West Coast Region, South Island
- Coordinates: 43°03′S 170°37′E
- Primary outflows: Wanganui River
- Basin countries: New Zealand

Lake Ianthe (Māori: Matahi; officially Lake Ianthe / Matahi) is a lake located on the West Coast of New Zealand's South Island. A number of small streams flow into the lake and it empties into the Wanganui River. It is close to the coast and near the rural settlements of Pukekura and Hari Hari, and State Highway 6 runs along the eastern shore of the lake on its route between Ross and the Franz Josef Glacier.

The lake is popular for boating, swimming, and trout fishing. In the early 20th century, a privately run bush tramway was established from the end of the New Zealand Railways Department's Ross Branch railway to logging interests in the Lake Ianthe area. This bush tramway was closed in 1959 when the sawmilling operation that owned the line shut down.

Following the passage of the Ngāi Tahu Claims Settlement Act 1998, the name of the lake was officially altered to Lake Ianthe / Matahi.
