= Ross Branch (railway line) =

Railway line in New Zealand

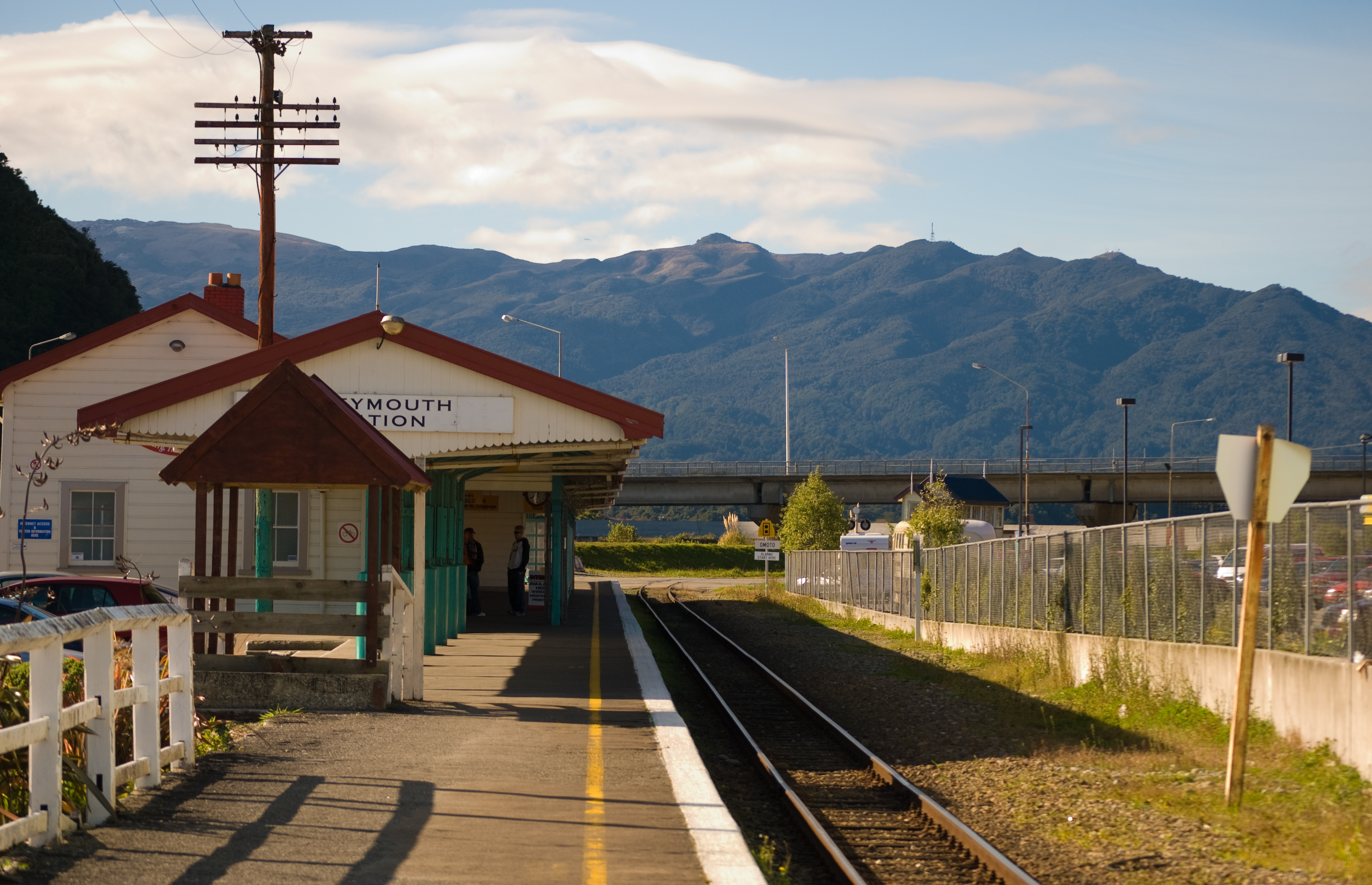
Greymouth railway station, the start of the Hokitika line

Map of the whole route, including closed sections.

The Ross Branch, officially known as the Hokitika Line since 2011, and previously as the Hokitika Industrial Line, is a branch line railway that forms part of New Zealand's national rail network. It is located in the Westland District of the South Island's West Coast region and opened to Hokitika in 1893. A further extension to Ross operated from 1 April 1909 until 24 November 1980.

== Construction ==
The first line opened in the region was a bush tramway built to a gauge of 1,219mm (4 ft). It ran from Greymouth south to Paroa and opened in 1867. Ten years later, an extension inland to Kumara was opened, with the Taramakau River crossed by a cage suspended from a wire. Around this time, plans were formulated to replace the tramway with a railway and link Greymouth and Hokitika. Work began in 1879, but the economic conditions of the Long Depression brought construction to a halt the next year with only 5 km of track laid. Furthermore, the residents of Kumara, led by future Prime Minister Richard Seddon, were indignant that the railway was going to take a more coastal route than the tramway and thus bypass their town. In 1886, work restarted, and the continued attempts from Kumara residents to have the line's route changed failed to force an alteration to the plans. Work progressed steadily over the next few years, and on 18 December 1893, the complete line from Hokitika to Greymouth opened.

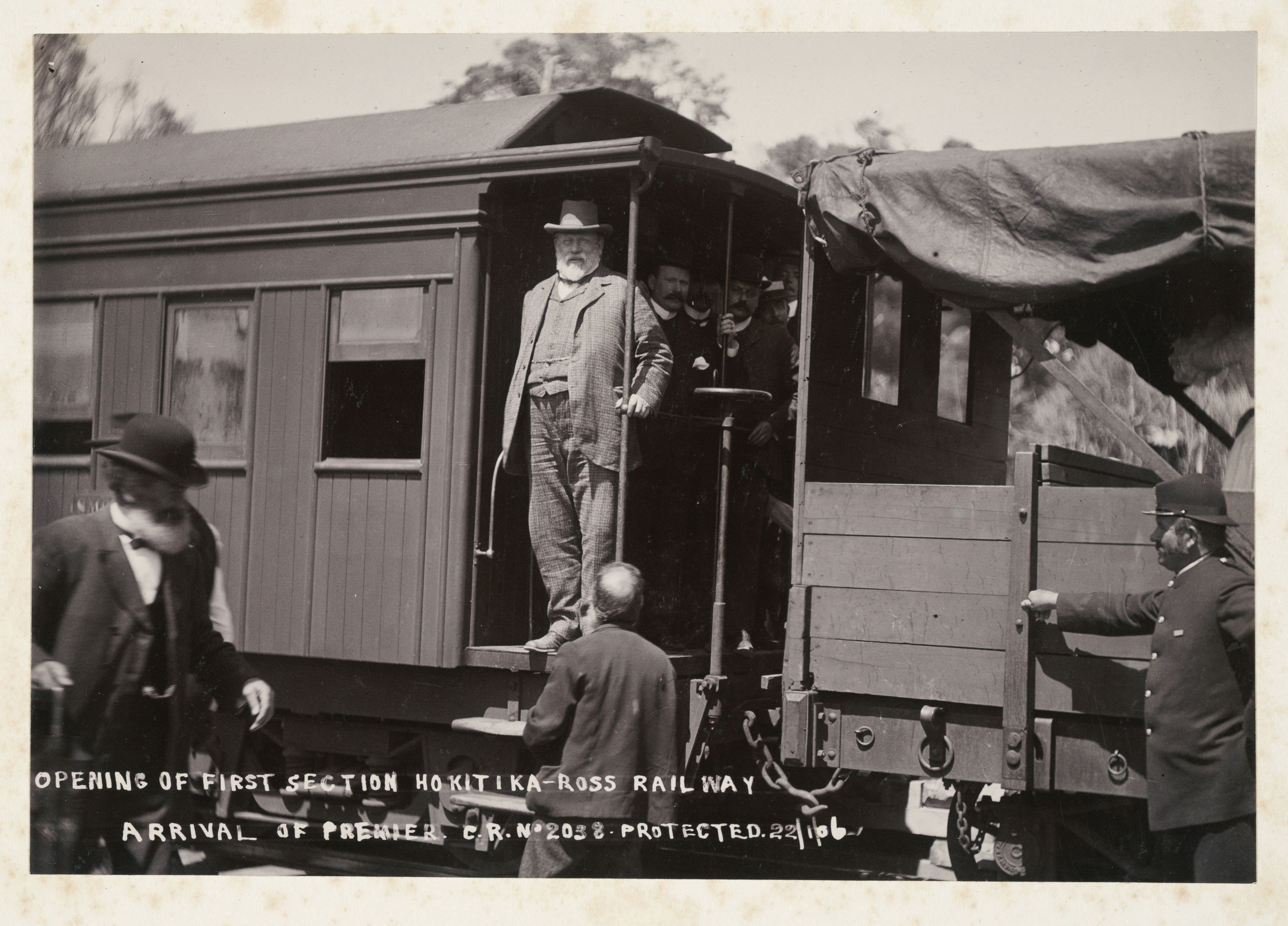
Prime Minister Richard Seddon on the Hokitika-Ross railway, West Coast, ca 22 Jan 1906

To the south of Hokitika was a thickly wooded country, and with the prospect of significant logging traffic, surveys for an extension of the railway were undertaken. In 1901, the government approved the construction of the extension, and preliminary work was well underway by August 1902. The first section, from Hokitika to Ruatapu, was opened on 9 November 1906, and the full line to Ross was completed on 1 April 1909.

== Further expansion ==
Even before the line had been built, it was intended to be part of a main-trunk line from Nelson to Dunedin. This would involve linking Ross to the Otago Central Railway (which at the time terminated in Omakau) via the Haast Pass and Wānaka, and this proposal was viewed favourably by Richard Seddon during his Prime Ministership in the early 20th century as a tourist route.

Local demand for expansion of the line further south to Waitaha saw authorisation made for an extension of the line from Ross to the south side of the Mikonui River however, in spite of a public pressure the earmarked funds were insufficient to construct the bridge and funding lapsed.

Despite the failure of the railway to progress beyond Ross, a number of bush tramways fanned out from the railway to provide more convenient access to sawmills and other industrial activity. The most notable of these was the one owned by Stuart and Chapman Ltd, which extended south from Ross for about 20 km to the Lake Ianthe area.

== Stations ==
The following stations are or were located on the Ross Branch (in brackets is the distance from Greymouth):

- Elmer Lane (1 km)
- Wharemoa (2.25 km), also known as Karoro
- Caltex private siding (3.03 km)
- Warburton Street (3.58 km) - just south of the station was an NZR siding to a shingle deposit
- South Beach (5.71 km), also known as Nelson Creek; junction with Stratford, Blair & Co. tramway
- Keith Road (7 km)
- Paroa (8.51 km)
- Gladstone (10.65 km), junction with Ogilvie & Co. tramway from 1910 to approximately 1959
- Camerons (13.26 km), junction with New River Gold Dredging Co. tramway
- Kumara (17.38 km)
- Chesterfield (22.91 km)
- Awatuna (25.83 km), junction with Awatuna Sawmilling Co. tramway
- Arahura (30.75 km)
- Kaihinui (32.7 km)
- Houhou (34.87 km), also spelt Hoho, junction with tramways of Baxter Bros. and J. C. Malfroy & Co.
- Seaview (36.55 km)
- Hokitika (38.45 km), private 1.4 km siding to Westland Milk Products factory
- Takutai (41.47 km), junction with Perry, Hegan & Co. tramway
- Mananui (45.49 km), junction with McCallum & Co. tramway
- Lake Mahinapua (48.45 km)
- Ruatapu (49.86 km), junction with Butler Bros. tramway from 1906 to 1958
- Papakamai (?? km)
- Ross (61.43 km), junction with Stuart & Chapman Ltd tramway from 1919 until 1959
- End of rails (61.88 km)

All private tramways that had junctions with the Ross Branch were closed by the end of the 1960s.

== Operation ==
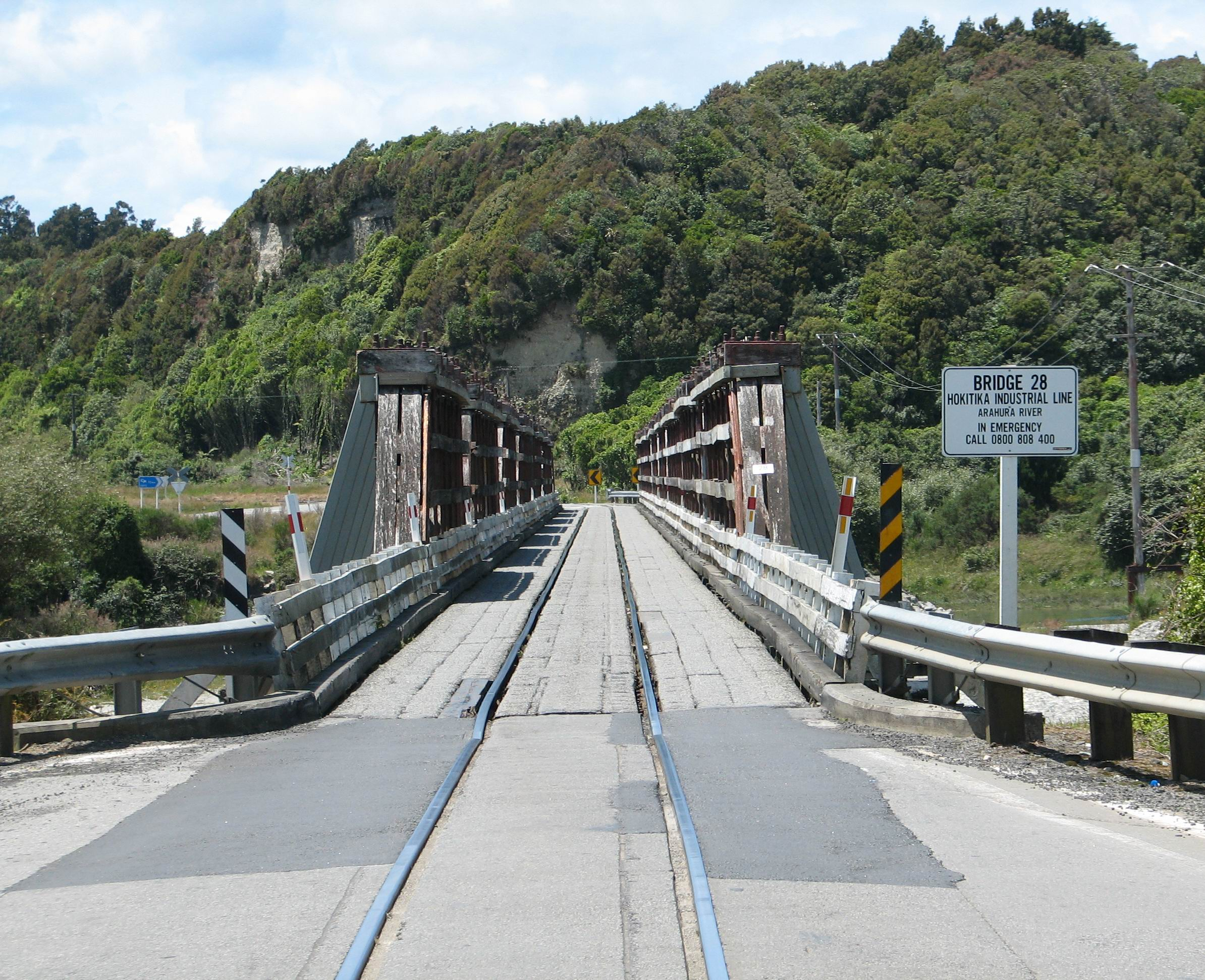
The road/rail bridge over the Arahura River. Note signage for the Hokitika Industrial Line

Although sometimes considered to be part of the Midland Line, the Ross Branch was almost wholly operated as a separate route from Greymouth. The 1906 timetable showed 2 or 3 passenger trains a day. Locomotive depots were established in both Ross and Hokitika, and when the Otira Tunnel linking the West Coast to Canterbury opened on 4 August 1923, the section to Hokitika began to increase in importance. Carriages from the Christchurch-Greymouth express were attached to mixed trains and conveyed to Hokitika while the extension to Ross operated more like a local line with two mixed trains daily. The introduction of small Leyland diesel railbuses in August 1936 to convey copies of the Christchurch Press newspaper to the West Coast led to the establishment of a direct service between Christchurch and Hokitika, as well as local services between Hokitika and Greymouth and briefly Reefton. By the early 1940s, the Vulcan railcars had replaced the Leylands and they ran all the way through from Christchurch to Ross, operating twice daily, with a Greymouth-Hokitika return service at mid-day, Monday to Friday. In 1955, the 88 seater railcars entered service in New Zealand, and on 20 February 1956, they began operating the services from Christchurch to Ross via Greymouth, significantly reducing the use of the Vulcans. They were augmented by two daily mixed trains to Ross, and these services lasted until 11 September 1967. The railcars operated for a few years more, but as of 9 October 1972, they ceased to run past Greymouth, removing the final passenger service on the line.

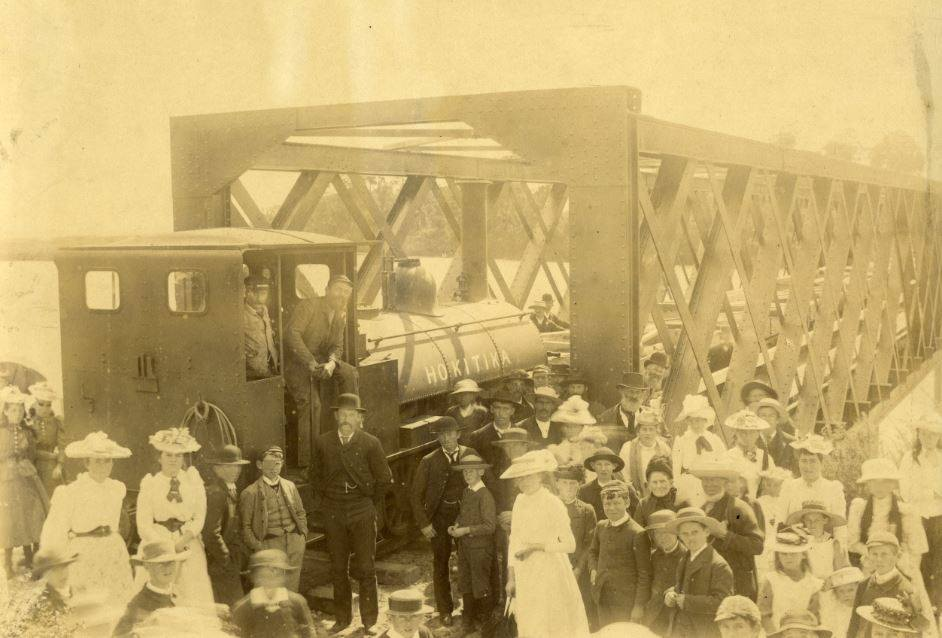
Taramakau road/rail bridge opening

In the early years of the line, timber was the dominant traffic from Ross, and in the 1920s, there was some pressure to operate NZR rolling stock on the Stuart and Chapman Ltd tramway, but this came to nothing and the tramway used private rolling stock until its closure in 1959. As the forests were felled, they were not replaced, and agriculture grew in importance, with agricultural lime and fertiliser railed in and livestock railed out; Ross served as the loading point for cattle driven up from southern Westland. By the 1970s, the line beyond Hokitika was operating uneconomically, and closure came in 1980. The combined road/rail bridge south of Hokitika, known as the "longest xylophone in the world" in New Zealand railfan jargon due to the rattling its planks made, required urgent repairs but it was decided that the cost outweighed the benefits due to the insignificance of the line. Road traffic was diverted to another bridge upstream and the line from Hokitika to Ross closed on 24 November 1980.

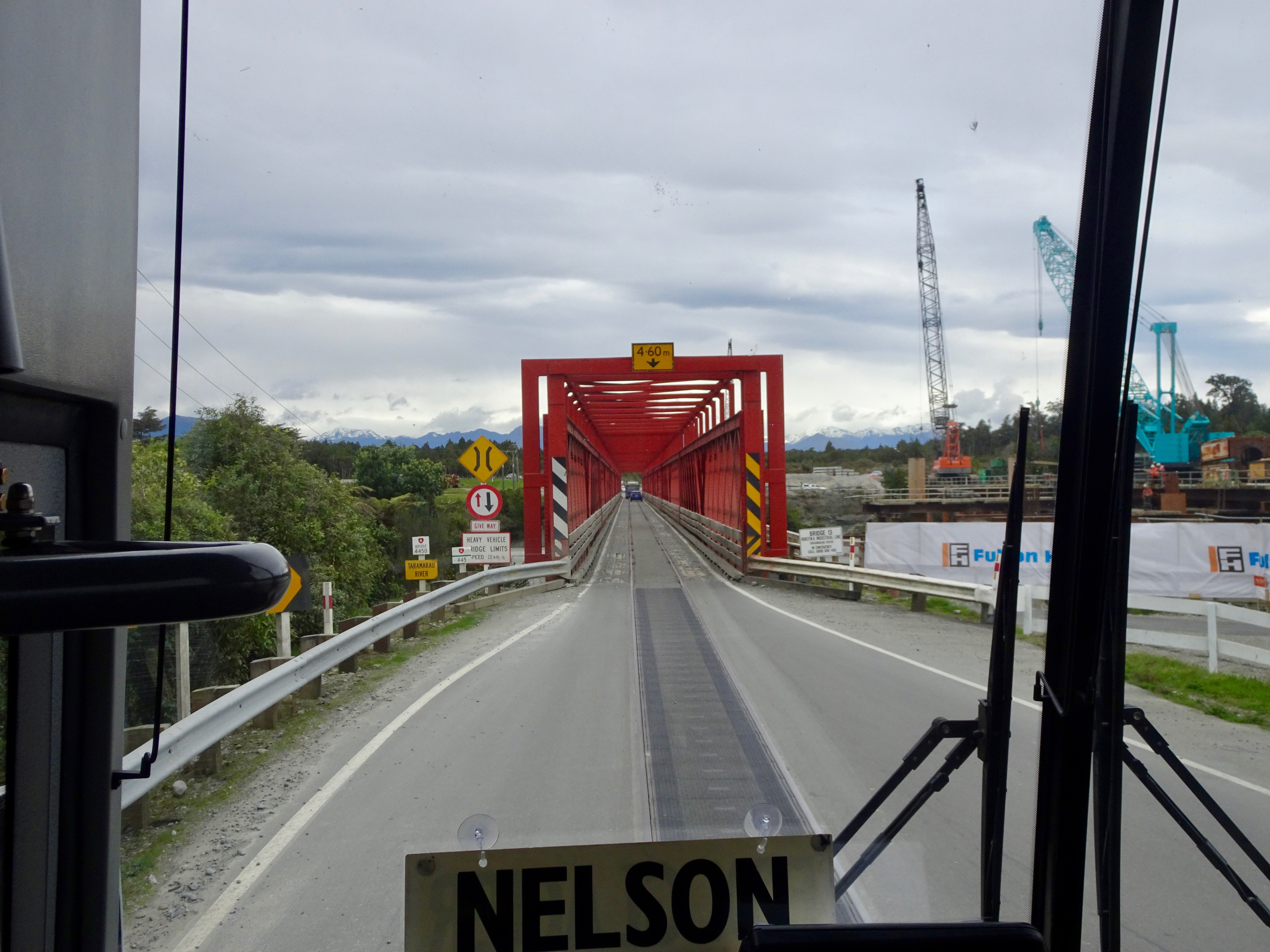
The road bridge opened in 2018, leaving the only road-rail bridges in the country on the Taieri Gorge Railway

This made the closure of the Ross section somewhat remarkable as its passenger service had ceased only eight years earlier; most rural New Zealand branches lost their passenger service at least two or three decades before the entire line was closed.

Presently every weekday a freight train operates from Greymouth to Hokitika in the morning and returns in the evening. It takes fifty minutes to run each way, operates only when required between June and August, and no trains run on weekends. The branch's primary customer is the Westland Milk Products plant, based in Hokitika, and trains are typically operated by diesel locomotives of the DC and DX classes. In the days of steam locomotives, members of the A and A^{B} had been based in Ross, and when the line was dieselised in May 1969, DJ class diesels became the primary motive power until the arrival of the DBRs and DCs, though for a few years in the 1970s, all trains had to be operated by D^{SC} class shunter locomotives before the Taramakau River bridge was repaired and upgraded. The bridge closed to road traffic on Sunday 22 July 2018, when a $25m road bridge opened.

== Hokitika–Ross section today ==
A few notable bridges, without rails, still stand on the route to Ross, including an impressive truss bridge over the Totara River just north of Ross itself and a smaller truss bridge over the Mahinapua Creek 5 km south of Hokitika that is now protected by the New Zealand Department of Conservation. The route between Ruatapu and Ross is largely out of sight from the road, but can be driven for much of its length and is used as an accessway by some locals. From Hokitika to Ruatapu, the railway's formation is readily apparent as it is often near the road, and the road has even been diverted to use portions of it. Little else remains of the railway due to the passage of time and influence of human and natural activity, but at the site of Ross's yard, some twisted rail and a loading bank remain. In March 2010 work was started on clearing the Ruatapa–Ross section for use by cyclists. However, the long-term future of this is somewhat in doubt due to gold prospecting in the area. A number of bridges still exist in this section and are being refurbished as part of the cycle track. The West Coast Wilderness Trail from Hokitika to Ross, which incorporates the former railway route from Ruatapu south, opened on 24 October 2015.
