= Pukekura =

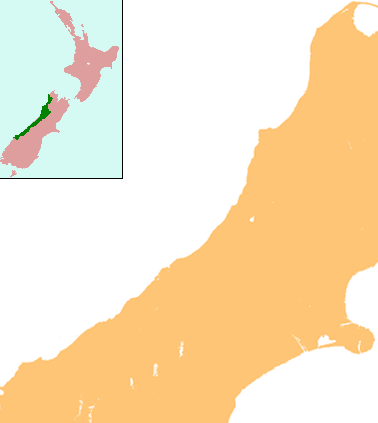
- Location within West Coast
- Coordinates: 43°0′30″S 170°40′25″E
- Country: New Zealand
- Region: West Coast
- District: Westland District
- Electorates: West Coast-Tasman; Te Tai Tonga
- Time zone: UTC+12 (NZST)
  - Summer (DST): UTC+13 (NZDT)
- Postcode: 7885
- Area code: 03
- Local iwi: Ngāi Tahu

Pukekura is located near Lake Ianthe in the West Coast region of the South Island. State Highway 6 passes through Pukekura on its route between Ross and Harihari, and the settlement is roughly 35 minutes south of Hokitika and an hour north of Franz Josef Glacier. It claimed to be the smallest town on the West Coast, with a population of two, though this was larger in past times when it was a saw-milling settlement. Timber was cut in the area from the early 1950s until the mid-1980s, and the town had been re-established as a tourist centre for a limited time, with a Bushman's Centre, pub, and accommodation. While the pub and the Bushman's Centre are closed as of 2020, accommodation facilities remain. The current population is 6, and the forest around the town is now a protected forest.

A possible translation of the name from Māori to English is "red hill".

== Climate ==
Climate data for Pukekura (1981–2010)
Month	Jan	Feb	Mar	Apr	May	Jun	Jul	Aug	Sep	Oct	Nov	Dec	Year
Mean daily maximum °C (°F)	19.6 (67.3)	20.7 (69.3)	19.0 (66.2)	16.5 (61.7)	14.2 (57.6)	11.9 (53.4)	11.7 (53.1)	12.6 (54.7)	14.3 (57.7)	15.1 (59.2)	16.9 (62.4)	18.4 (65.1)	15.9 (60.6)
Daily mean °C (°F)	14.9 (58.8)	15.3 (59.5)	13.7 (56.7)	11.4 (52.5)	9.1 (48.4)	6.9 (44.4)	6.2 (43.2)	7.3 (45.1)	9.0 (48.2)	10.3 (50.5)	11.9 (53.4)	13.8 (56.8)	10.8 (51.5)
Mean daily minimum °C (°F)	10.1 (50.2)	10.0 (50.0)	8.3 (46.9)	6.3 (43.3)	3.9 (39.0)	1.8 (35.2)	0.7 (33.3)	2.0 (35.6)	3.8 (38.8)	5.5 (41.9)	7.0 (44.6)	9.2 (48.6)	5.7 (42.3)
Average rainfall mm (inches)	472.9 (18.62)	195.0 (7.68)	281.2 (11.07)	235.0 (9.25)	258.9 (10.19)	276.3 (10.88)	265.9 (10.47)	253.8 (9.99)	224.8 (8.85)	372.9 (14.68)	290.7 (11.44)	377.4 (14.86)	3,504.8 (137.98)
Source: NIWA
