= 18th Niue Assembly =

Legislative term since 2023

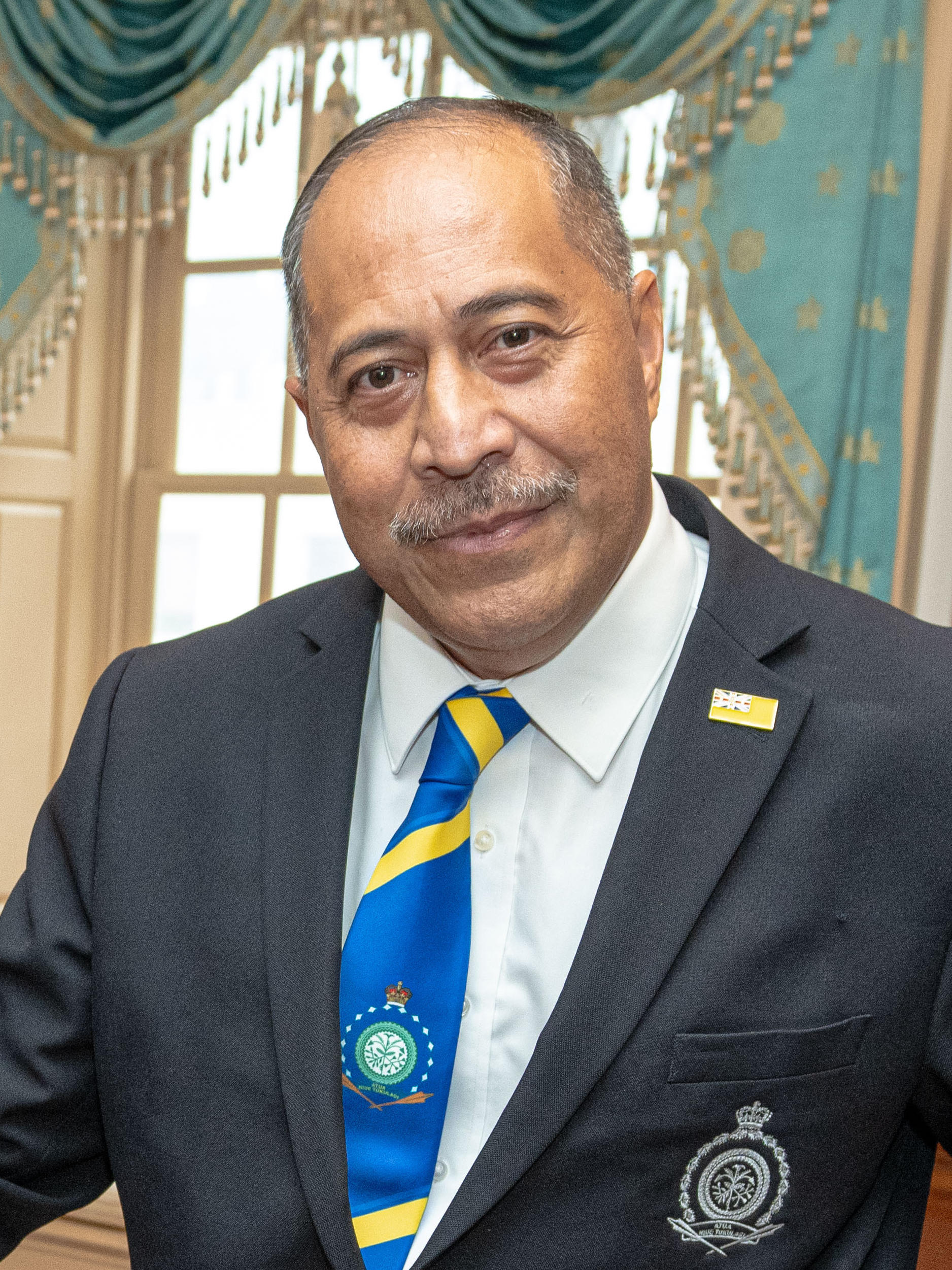
Dalton Tagelagi, Premier of the 18th Niue Assembly, pictured in 2023

The 18th Niue Assembly was a term of the Niue Assembly. Its composition was determined by the general election on 29 April 2023.

== Election of Assembly ==
The 20 members of the Assembly are elected by two methods; 14 are elected from single-member consistencies using first-past-the-post voting and six are elected from a single nationwide constituency by multiple non-transferable vote. There are no political parties in Niue.

Historically, elections have occurred triennially in May or June; however, in late 2022, Premier of Niue Dalton Tagelagi indicated that he was considering holding elections early, in February or March 2023. The rationale for this shift would be to give the government more time to prepare and pass the budget before the end of the country's fiscal year in June. The election ultimately occurred in late April 2023.

Eight of the twenty seats were won by first-time Assembly members. Two long-time members of parliament were unseated in the election: Terry Coe, who was first elected to the Niue Assembly in a common roll seat in 1993, and Opili Talafasi, who held the Hikutavake seat for 33 years.

Provisional results indicated that the sixth and final common roll seat was a tie between two candidates, Birtha Lisimoni-Togahai and Sonya Talagi, which required a draw from a hat to break the tie. This would have been the first time in Niue's history that this tiebreaking protocol had been required. However, upon recount, Sonya Talagi won the seat by two votes. Lisimoni-Togahai filed a petition for a recount in Hikutavake, Mutalau, and Tuapa, where vote tallies changed in the recount.

== Election of Premier ==
The Premier of Niue is elected by the members of the Niue Assembly at the first meeting after a general election and must win an absolute majority of votes to be elected. Incumbent Dalton Tagelagi was re-elected as the premier of Niue after defeating opposition leader O'Love Jacobsen 16 votes to 4.

== Appointment of Cabinet ==
The Cabinet is made up of four members: The Premier as chair, along with three members of the Niue Assembly. Cabinet members are assigned portfolios of ministries that they oversee. Tagelagi appointed two incumbent members of the Assembly, Crossley Tatui and Esa Mona Sharon Ainuu to the Cabinet, along with Sonya Talagi, a newly elected common roll assembly member. This marked the first time in the history of Niue that the Cabinet was gender-balanced, with two men and two women.

== Members ==
The members of the 18th Legislative Assembly are:

Name	Electorate
Esa Mona Ainu'u	Tuapa
Tutuli Heka	Alofi North
Sinahemana Hekau	Common Roll
Ian Hipa	Hikutavake
O'Love Jacobsen	Common Roll
Emani Fakaotimanava-Lui	Common Roll
Riki Makani	Tamakautoga
Richie Mautama	Hakupu
Maureen Melekitama	Mutalau
Tofua Puletama	Makefu
Logopati Seumanu	Liku
Sione Silapea Sionetuato	Namukulu
Dalton Tagelagi	Alofi South
Billy Talagi	Common Roll
Sonya Talagi	Common Roll
Talaititama Talaiti	Vaiea
Crossley Tatui	Common Roll
Dion Paki Taufitu	Toi
Rhonda Tiakia Tomailuga	Lakepa
Poimamao Vakanofiti	Avatele

== Policies and events ==
Tagelagi delivered the State Opening on 15 May 2023 alongside maiden speeches given by new members of the Assembly. In the State Opening, Tagelagi addressed several focus areas for the 18th Niue Assembly. These included constitutional reform, saying “We can start with the constitution reforms, something that wasn’t achieved by the 17th Assembly. We continued to say that "We [Niue] all know that the constitution needs amendment to meet the demanding work of modern day life and align ourselves to international standards, UN international conventions, institutional membership ... that we have established to drive our humble island forward". Other acts and bills discussed by Tagelagi included suggesting a review of the Immigration Act, passing of the Niue Public Service Act, which had been in draft form for two decades, and progressing an Electoral Bill and Land Bill. He also noted that public–private partnerships would be a focus of the 18th Niue Assembly, as well as reviewing the current tax structure for potential tax breaks and implementing environmental taxation.

On 15 May 2023, Tagelagi left Niue for three weeks to attend the inaugural Korea–Pacific Islands Summit, at which Tagelagi formalised diplomatic relations between Niue and South Korea. During his absence, Crossley Tatui served as Acting Premier, and Tofua Puletama as Acting Minister in Tagelagi's ministerial positions.
