= 2026 Niuean general election =

- 2 May 2026

All 20 members of the Assembly 11 seats needed for a majority
	First party
Party	Independents
Seats won	20
Prime Minister before election
Dalton Tagelagi
Independent
Elected Prime Minister
Dalton Tagelagi
Independent

General elections were held in Niue on 2 May 2026, having been called by Speaker Hima Douglas on 11 March 2026. The list of candidates was announced on 16 April. Key issues in the island territory included rising grocery and fuel prices, as well as frequent power outages.

Following the election, Dalton Tagelagi was re-elected for a third term as prime minister. Douglas, who intended to retire from politics, was replaced by Billy Talagi as speaker of the Niue Assembly.

== Background ==
The previous elections in 2023 saw three of the common-roll seats go to newcomers; Sonya Talagi won the last of them by two votes. Six women were elected, and three sitting MPs were unseated. Dalton Tagelagi was re-elected as premier, and proceeded to appoint the first gender-balanced cabinet in Niuean history.

Four constitutional amendments advanced through the assembly in 2024, which included proposals to change the title "premier" to "prime minister", increase the cabinet from four members to six, extend the term of the assembly from three years to four years, and identify the auditor-general of New Zealand as Niue's official auditor. Changes to cabinet size and term length were rejected, but the title change and the auditor designation were approved.

On 3 June 2024, New Zealand's prime minister Christopher Luxon stated that the nation of Niue will be able to generate 80% of its electricity from renewable sources following a pledged investment of $20.5 million, while $2 million was also committed by New Zealand to Niue's Ocean Wide Trust (NOW) to ensure long-term climate resiliency. During the celebration of the 50th anniversary of self-government in October 2024, prime minister Tagelagi highlighted the various developments that have taken place in the various sectors of health, education, conservation, and the arts. On 8 November 2024, Tagelagi announced a cabinet reshuffle. Germany would recognise Niue as a sovereign state on 3 February 2026 following a meeting between Tagelagi and German foreign minister Johann Wadephul, establishing regional cooperation relating to climate change. Tagelagi would propose a meeting with the Realm of New Zealand on 4 February 2026, while also signaling that he may seek one more term as prime minister before stepping away from politics. Assembly Speaker Douglas, who retained the speakership in 2023, announced his retirement from speakership ahead of the 2026 election.

== Electoral system ==
The 20 members of the assembly are elected by two methods; 14 are elected from single-member consistencies using first-past-the-post voting and six are elected from a single nationwide constituency by multiple non-transferable vote. Political parties have not been formed. After the election, the members of the assembly elect a speaker from outside parliament, and a prime minister, who must be an MP. The prime minister then chooses a cabinet.

Since 2023, candidates seeking nomination must pay a fee of NZ$200.

== Campaign ==
The campaign period officially began following the dissolution of the Assembly on 27 March 2026. Economic pressure remained the main concern for Niueans, as the prices of groceries and fuel rose and electricity outages became frequent. Secondary issues included the brain drain affecting the nation, pressure on essential services such as healthcare and transport, and climate resilience. Incumbent prime minister Dalton Tagelagi stated that his final term, if elected, would focus on implementing projects including a new justice building in Alofi and a $9 million Asian Development Bank project to expand aged care into a retirement village, along with conducting feasibility studies on wharf upgrades and a disaster response warehouse. 26 candidates contested village representatives seats, while 18 candidates ran for the common roll seats. In April 2026, Tagelagi's cabinet confirmed that fuel prices would be increased in stages, with a potential 150% jump in costs by June, while also urging Niueans to use fuel wisely and not to panic buy. Petrol prices soared to NZ$3.80 per litre, especially in the aftermath of the 2026 Iran war. 10 common roll candidates addressed the township during a village meeting in Alofi South, while another forum was hosted by alumni of the University of the South Pacific at the Matavai Resort, where candidates presented their long-term visions for the nation. Tagelagi contested his village seat of Alofi South, while also acknowledging the current challenges facing Niue during the campaign. Results that come from Alofi South will both determine whether Tagelagi will keep his seat and who is able to form a majority to lead the 19th Niue Assembly.

== Conduct ==
Advance voting was conducted the day before the election, and polling booths on election day were open from 9:00 am to 6:00 pm local time (UTC−11:00). Preliminary results were available live from 7:00 pm, and official results were declared on 6 May 2026.

== Results ==
Preliminary results that were disclosed on 3 May 2026 indicated that the majority of incumbents returned to the Assembly. Emani Fakaotimanava-Lui, Sonya Talagi and Sinahemana Hekau were re-elected through the common roll, while Robert BJ Rex, Moira Enetama, and Richmond Lisimoni-Togahai were newly elected. Finance minister Crossley Tatui, Billy Talagi, and O'Love Jacobsen all lost their common roll seats. Tutuli Heka in Alofi North, Richie Mautama in Hakupu, Silepea Sione in Namukulu, and Talaititama Talaiti in Vaiea were re-elected unopposed. Several other ministers and village representatives returned to the Assembly, including Ian Hipa in Hikutavake, Logopati Seumanu in Liku, Rhonda Tiakia in Lakepa, Maureen Melekitama in Mutalau, and Dion Taufitu in Toi. Incumbent prime minister Dalton Tagelagi was narrowly re-elected in Alofi South by one vote, defeating his challenger Alana Rex. In Tamakautoga, incumbent Ricky Makani lost his seat to newcomer Hiki Puheke, while in Avatele, Pita Vakanofiti was unseated by Hetututama Hetutu. A record number of seven women were elected to the Assembly.

=== Common roll ===
Candidate	Votes	%	Notes
Robert Leslie Rex	561	11.04	Elected
Moira Enetama	507	9.97	Elected
Richmond Lisimoni-Togahai	358	7.04	Elected
Emani Fakaotimanava-Lui (i)	325	6.39	Re-elected
Sonya Talagi (i)	316	6.22	Re-elected
Sinahemana Hekau (i)	304	5.98	Re-elected
James Douglas	297	5.84	
Matagi Vilitama	295	5.80	
Crossley Tatui (i)	294	5.78	Unseated
O'Love Jacobsen (i)	282	5.55	Unseated
Stanley Kalauni	276	5.43	
Billy Talagi (i)	266	5.23	Unseated
Dempster Tomailuga	242	4.76	
Esther Pavihi	227	4.47	
Terry Coe	197	3.88	
Tom Misikea	152	2.99	
Rosa Togahai	118	2.32	
Sioneheke Leolahi	66	1.30	
Total	5,083	100.00	
Source: Broadcasting Corporation of Niue

==== By constituency ====
Candidate	Alofi North	Alofi South	Avatele	Hakupu	Hikutavake	Lakepa	Liku	Makefu	Mutalau	Namukulu	Tamakautoga	Toi	Tuapa	Vaiea
Robert Leslie Rex	62	157	41	49	10	34	34	30	34	2	44	15	36	13
Moira Enetama	52	113	34	45	11	53	30	26	36	7	29	12	42	17
Richmond Lisimoni-Togahai	31	87	35	44	13	23	16	12	24	5	17	7	39	5
Emani Fakaotimanava-Lui	62	98	17	11	9	24	12	13	12	3	14	8	29	13
Sonya Talagi	29	51	17	41	12	18	18	22	23	6	18	12	40	9
Sinahemana Hekau	30	78	19	19	8	22	25	16	14	4	28	14	15	12
James Douglas	27	59	45	21	7	13	21	11	15	1	39	7	17	14
Matagi Vilitama	22	56	23	29	4	20	13	15	37	3	24	10	27	12
Crossley Tatui	22	48	22	86	4	18	15	8	12	2	21	8	19	9
O'Love Jacobsen	31	85	23	14	5	7	21	8	9	0	28	7	21	23
Stanley Kalauni	41	69	11	23	13	14	25	13	9	2	8	7	31	10
Billy Talagi	16	58	47	22	8	14	13	11	10	2	26	3	27	9
Dempster Tomailuga	21	55	9	46	9	12	18	8	16	0	16	4	22	6
Esther Pavihi	16	53	31	8	6	24	6	9	6	3	20	7	32	6
Terry Coe	17	52	13	8	7	10	16	10	4	2	21	9	8	20
Tom Misikea	3	20	10	68	2	10	14	2	6	0	6	0	10	1
Rosa Togahai	6	42	8	5	9	7	4	8	6	0	4	1	18	0
Sioneheke Leolahi	9	16	3	12	0	4	2	5	5	0	5	2	2	1
Total votes	497	1,197	408	551	137	327	303	227	278	42	368	133	435	180
Source: Broadcasting Corporation of Niue

=== Constituencies ===
Results for constituencies
Constituency	Candidate	Votes	%	Results
Alofi North	Tutuli Heka	–	–	Re-elected unopposed
Alofi South	Dalton Tagelagi	111	50.23	Re-elected
Alofi South	Alana Rex	110	49.77	
Alofi South	Total	221	100.00	
Alofi South	Valid votes	221	97.79	
Alofi South	Invalid/blank votes	5	2.21	
Alofi South	Total votes	226	100.00	
Avatele	Hetututama Hetutu	41	56.94	Elected
Avatele	Pita Vakanofiti	31	43.06	Unseated
Avatele	Total	72	100.00	
Avatele	Valid votes	72	96.00	
Avatele	Invalid/blank votes	3	4.00	
Avatele	Total votes	75	100.00	
Hakupu	Richie Mautama	–	–	Re-elected unopposed
Hikutavake	Ian Hipa	14	60.87	Re-elected
Hikutavake	Opili Talafasi	9	39.13	
Hikutavake	Total	23	100.00	
Hikutavake	Valid votes	23	100.00	
Hikutavake	Invalid/blank votes	0	0.00	
Hikutavake	Total votes	23	100.00	
Lakepa	Rhonda Tiakia	43	69.35	Re-elected
Lakepa	Charlotte Magatogia	19	30.65	
Lakepa	Total	62	100.00	
Lakepa	Valid votes	62	96.88	
Lakepa	Invalid/blank votes	2	3.12	
Lakepa	Total votes	64	100.00	
Liku	Logopati Seumanu	35	64.81	Re-elected
Liku	Sionetasi Pulehetoa	19	35.19	
Liku	Total	54	100.00	
Liku	Valid votes	54	100.00	
Liku	Invalid/blank votes	0	0.00	
Liku	Total votes	54	100.00	
Makefu	Tofua Puletama	26	76.47	Re-elected
Makefu	Charlie Tohovaka	8	23.53	
Makefu	Total	34	100.00	
Makefu	Valid votes	34	91.89	
Makefu	Invalid/blank votes	3	8.11	
Makefu	Total votes	37	100.00	
Mutalau	Maureen Melekitama	24	53.33	Re-elected
Mutalau	Pelenato Bourne	17	37.78	
Mutalau	Makaseau Ioane	4	8.89	
Mutalau	Total	45	100.00	
Mutalau	Valid votes	45	100.00	
Mutalau	Invalid/blank votes	0	0.00	
Mutalau	Total votes	45	100.00	
Namukulu	Silepea Sione	–	–	Re-elected unopposed
Tamakautoga	Hiki Puheke	28	41.79	Elected
Tamakautoga	Ricky Makani	23	34.33	Unseated
Tamakautoga	Andrew Funaki	16	23.88	
Tamakautoga	Total	67	100.00	
Tamakautoga	Valid votes	67	93.06	
Tamakautoga	Invalid/blank votes	5	6.94	
Tamakautoga	Total votes	72	100.00	
Toi	Dion Taufitu	18	81.82	Re-elected
Toi	Melealiva Kaulima	4	18.18	
Toi	Total	22	100.00	
Toi	Valid votes	22	95.65	
Toi	Invalid/blank votes	1	4.35	
Toi	Total votes	23	100.00	
Tuapa	Mona Ainuu	60	77.92	Re-elected
Tuapa	Henry Eveni	17	22.08	
Tuapa	Total	77	100.00	
Tuapa	Valid votes	77	100.00	
Tuapa	Invalid/blank votes	0	0.00	
Tuapa	Total votes	77	100.00	
Vaiea	Talaititama Talaiti	–	–	Re-elected unopposed

== Aftermath ==
The Niue Assembly reconvened on 13 May 2026 to elect a speaker and a prime minister. Elected members of the Assembly, new or returning, were sworn in. Billy Talagi, who had lost his common roll seat, became the new speaker of the Assembly after defeating Togia Sioneholo in a 12–8 vote. Dalton Tagelagi was also re-elected for a third term as prime minister after defeating Emani Fakaotimanava-Lui in a close vote of 11–9. Tagelagi's third cabinet was announced on 19 May, maintaining a gender-balanced cabinet. Richie Mautama became home minister, Rhonda Tiakia was appointed justice and land minister, and Sinahemana Hekau became health and education minister.
