= 17th Niue Assembly =

2020–2023 legislative term

The 17th Niue Assembly was a term of the Niue Assembly. Its composition was determined by the 2020 election, held on 30 May 2020.

== Members ==
The members of the 17th Legislative Assembly are:

=== Common roll ===
- Richard Hipa
- Sauni Tongatule
- Crossley Tatui
- Stan Kalauni
- O'Love Jacobsen
- Terry Coe

=== Constituency ===
- Va'aiga Tukuitonga
- Dalton Tagelagi
- Pita Vakanofiti
- Richie Mautama
- Opili Talafas
- John Operator Tiakia
- Tofua Puletama
- Makaseau Ioane
- Jack Lipitoa
- Ricky Makani
- Dion Taufitu
- Mona Ainuu
- Talaititama Talaiti
