= 16th Niue Assembly =

2017–2020 legislative term

The 16th Niue Assembly was a term of the Niue Assembly. Its composition was determined by the 2017 election, held on June 6, 2017.

The Speaker of the 16th Assembly is Togiavalu Pihigia.

== Members ==
The members of the 16th Legislative Assembly are:

Name	Electorate
Mona Ainu'u	Tuapa
Terry Coe	Common Roll
Andrew Funaki	Tamakautoga
O'Love Jacobsen	Common Roll
Michael Jackson	Hakupu
Stan Kalauni	Common Roll
Jack Willie Lipitoa	Namukulu
Halene Magatogia	Lakepa
Bill Vakaafi Motufoou	Mutalau
Tofua Puletama	Makefu
Pokotoa Sipeli	Liku
Dalton Tagelagi	Alofi South
Joan Tahafa-Viliamu	Common Roll
Opili Talafasi	Hikutavake
Billy Talagi	Avatele
Toke Talagi	Common Roll
Talititama Taliati	Vaiea
Crossley Tatui	Common Roll
Dion Taufitu	Toi
Va'aiga Tukuitonga	Alofi North
