= Cabinet of Niue =

Chief executive body of Niue

The coat of arms of Niue as used by the Cabinet

The Cabinet of Niue is the chief executive body of Niue. It consists of the Prime Minister and three other ministers, who are collectively responsible to the Niue Assembly.

== Constitutional basis ==
The Cabinet has a formal legislative basis in the Constitution of Niue. Cabinet consists of the Prime Minister and three other ministers. Members are appointed by the Speaker on advice of the Prime Minister, and must be members of the Niue Assembly.

In the 2024 constitutional referendum, Niuean voters rejected a proposal to expand the Cabinet to six members.

== Current ministers ==
3rd Dalton Tagelagi Cabinet
Minister	Portfolio
Dalton Tagelagi	Prime Minister Office of the Secretary of Government; Niue Public Service Commission; Ministry of Finance and Economic Growth; Foreign Affairs; Crown Law & Regulatory Authority; State Owned Enterprises; Oceans & Fisheries; Climate Change
Richie Mautama	Home Affairs Niue Police, Corrections and National Disaster Management Office; Ministry of Infrastructure; Transport; Airport; Utilities; Telecom Niue; Broadcasting Corporation of Niue Associate minister: Ministry of Finance and Economic Growth
Rhonda Tiakia	Justice, Lands, Survey Meteorological Service; Department of Environment; Agriculture Associate minister: Home Affairs; Taoga Niue; Tourism; Climate Change
Kahealani Hekau	Health Education; Taoga Niue; Tourism Associate minister: Justice, Lands, Survey; Foreign Affairs; Ministry of Infrastructure; Transport; Airport; Utilities

== Former Cabinets ==
=== Robert Rex ===
(19 October 1974 – 12 December 1992)

- Hon. Dr. Enetama Lipitoa
- Hon. Frank Fakaotimanava Lui
- Hon. Young Vivian
- Hon. Robert Rex

=== 1st Young Vivian ===
(1st time) (12 December 1992 – 9 March 1993)

- Hon1
- Hon2
- Hon3

=== Frank Lui ===
(9 March 1993 – 26 March 1999)

- Hon. Terry Coe
- Hon. O'love Tauveve Jacobsen
- Hon. Fisa Igilisi Pihigia

=== Sani Lakatani ===
(26 March 1999 – 1 May 2002)

- Sani Lakatani (Finance, Economic Development, Offshore Banking, Tourism, Civil Aviation, Post and Telecommunications, and External Affairs)
- Hon. Young Vivian (Education, Community Affairs, Art, Culture, Women's Affairs, Youth Affairs, Environment)
- Hon. Dion Taufitu (Administrative Services, Public Works, Agriculture, Fisheries, Forestry, Employment, Broadcasting)
- Hon. Robert Matua Rex, Jr (Health, Public Service Commission, Justice, Lands and Survey, Shipping and Trade, Police and Immigration)

Associate Ministers:

- Toke Talagi (Economic Development and Civil Aviation)
- Hima Douglas

=== 2nd Young Vivian ===
(2nd time) (1 May 2002 – June 2005)

- Hon Sani Lakatani: Deputy Prime Minister (later replaced by Fisa Igilisi Pihigia)
- Hon. Bill Vakaafi Motufoou: Works, Agriculture and Fisheries
- Hon. Toke Talagi: Finance, Education, Health

=== 3rd Young Vivian ===
(3rd time) (1 May 2005 – June 2008)

- Hon. Fisa Igilisi Pihigia
- Hon. Bill Vakaafi Motufoou
- Hon. Va'aiga Tukuitonga

=== 1st Toke Talagi ===
(June 2008 – May 2011)

Portfolio	Minister	Photo	Constituency
Premier, Minister of Finance, Customs and Revenue and Government Assets, Minister of Police and National Security, Minister of Private Sector Development, Minister of Tourism, Minister of Meteorological Services and Climate Change, Minister of the Environment, Minister of Youth and Sports, Minister in charge of the Niue Public Service Commission	Toke Tufukia Talagi		Common roll representative
Minister of Post and Telecommunications, Minister of Agriculture, Forestry and Fisheries, Minister of Administrative Services	Pokotoa Sipeli		Liku
Minister of Health, Minister of Public Works, Minister of Women's Affairs, Minister in charge of the Niue Power Corporation	O’Love Jacobsen		Common roll representative
Minister of Community Affairs, Minister of Justice, Lands and Survey, Minister of Education, Minister of Shipping, Minister of Bulk Fuel	Togia Sioneholo		Common roll representative

=== 2nd Toke Talagi ===
(May 2011 – April 2014)

Portfolio	Minister	Photo	Constituency
Premier, Minister for Finance, Customs and Revenue, and Government Assets Taxation, Minister for the Infrastructure Department, Minister for Transport, Minister for the Niue Public Service Commission, Minister of Police and National Security, Minister for Immigration and Population, Minister for Civil Aviation, Minister for Tourism, Minister for the Niue Post and Telecommunications, Minister for the Niue Development Bank	Toke Tufukia Talagi		Common roll representative
Minister for Education, Minister for Agriculture, Forestry and Fishery, Minister for Administrative Services and the Niue Training and Development Unit	Pokotoa Sipeli		Liku
Minister for Public Works, Minister for the Niue Power Corporation, Minister for Justice, Lands and Survey, Minister for Bulk Fuel	Halene Magatogia		Lakepa
Minister for Health, Minister for Community Affairs, Minister for the Niue Broadcasting Corporation	Joan Viliamu		Common roll representative

=== 3rd Toke Talagi ===
(April 2014 - May 2017)

Minister	Portfolio	Constituency	Assistant Minister
Toke Tufukia Talagi	Premier Responsible for the departments of Finance and Planning; Crown Law; NPSC & Secretariat; Police; Commercial Agencies	Common roll representative	
Pokotoa Sipeli	Minister for Education and Social Services Responsible for the departments of Justice; Taoga Niue; Education; Health	Liku	Joan Viliamu
Billy Talagi	Minister of Natural Resources Responsible for the departments of Agriculture, Forestry and Fishery; Meteorological Services; Environment	Avatele	Halene Magatogia
Dalton Tagelagi	Minister of Infrastructure Responsible for the departments of Transport; Communications; Utilities	Alofi South	Talaititama Talaiti

=== 4th Toke Talagi ===
(May 2017 - June 2020)

Minister	Portfolio	Constituency	Assistant Minister
Toke Tufukia Talagi	Premier Minister for Central and Commercial Agencies; Responsible for the departments of Cabinet & Legislative; Finance and Planning; Crown Law; NPSC & Secretariat; Police and National Security; Commercial Agencies	Common roll representative	
Billy Talagi	Minister for Education and Social Services Responsible for the departments of Justice; Taoga Niue; Education; Health	Avatele	Talaititama Talaiti
Dalton Tagelagi	Minister of Natural Resources Responsible for the departments of Agriculture, Forestry and Fishery; Meteorological Services; Environment	Alofi South	Mona Ainu'u
Pokotoa Sipeli	Minister of Infrastructure Responsible for the departments of Transport; Communications; Utilities	Liku	Andrew Funaki

=== 1st Dalton Tagelagi ===
(June 2020 - May 2023)

Minister	Portfolio	Constituency	Assistant Minister
Dalton Tagelagi	Premier Minister for Central and Commercial Agencies; Responsible for the departments of Cabinet & Legislative; Crown Law; NPSC & Secretariat; Police and National Security; Commercial Agencies	Alofi South	
Crossley Tatui	Minister of Finance and Infrastructure Responsible for the departments of Finance and Planning; Transport; Communications; Utilities	Common roll representative	
Mona Ainu'u	Minister of Natural Resources Responsible for the departments of Agriculture, Forestry and Fishery; Meteorological Services; Environment	Tuapa	
Sauni Tongatule	Minister for Education and Social Services Responsible for the departments of Justice; Taoga Niue; Education; Health	Common roll representative	

=== 2nd Dalton Tagelagi ===
(May 2023 - May 2026)

Minister	Portfolio	Constituency	Assistant Minister
Dalton Tagelagi	Prime Minister Minister for Central and Commercial Agencies; Responsible for the departments of Cabinet & Legislative; Foreign Affairs; Climate Change; Crown Law; Police and National Security; Commercial Agencies	Alofi South	Sinahemana Hekau
Crossley Tatui	Minister of Finance and Infrastructure Responsible for the departments of Finance and Planning; Transport; Communications; Utilities	Common roll representative	Ricky Makani
Mona Ainu'u	Minister of Natural Resources Responsible for the departments of Agriculture, Forestry and Fishery; Meteorological Services; Environment	Tuapa	Emani Fakaotimanava-Lui
Sonya Talagi	Minister for Education and Social Services Responsible for the departments of Justice; Taoga Niue; Education; Health	Common roll representative	Maureen Melekitama
