= 2005 Niuean general election =

- 30 April 2005

All 20 seats in the Assembly 11 seats needed for a majority

General elections were held in Niue on 30 April 2005. No political parties ran in the poll, with all candidates standing as independents. Around 830 voters participated in the election and 17 of the 20 incumbent MPs retained their seats. Close results in two constituencies meant that winners were drawn from a hat.

== Results ==
All electorate results from http://en.wikinews.org/wiki/World's_smallest_democracy_votes

=== Common roll ===
Candidate	Votes	%	Notes
Krypton Okesene	578	18.19	Elected
Terry Coe	563	17.72	Elected
O'Love Jacobsen	508	15.98	Elected
Hima Douglas	403	12.68	Elected
Michael Jackson	378	11.89	Elected
Maihetoe Hekau	375	11.80	Elected
Toke Talagi	373	11.74	
Total	3,178	100.00	

=== Constituencies ===
Constituency	Candidate	Votes	%	Notes
Alofi North	Vaiga Tukuitoga	62	57.94	Elected unopposed
Alofi North	Terry Chapman	27	25.23	
Alofi North	Thomas Barlament	18	16.82	
Alofi South	Organ Viliko	66	38.37	Elected
Alofi South	Makamau Hekau	54	31.40	
Alofi South	Robert Matua Rex, Jr.	52	30.23	
Avatele	Billy Talagi	—	—	Elected unopposed
Hakupu	Young Vivian	—	—	Elected unopposed
Hikutavake	Opili Talafasi	—	—	Elected unopposed
Lakepa	Halene Kupa Magatogia	27	60.00	Elected unopposed
Lakepa	John Operator Tiakia	18	40.00	
Liku	Pokotoa Sipeli	—	—	Elected unopposed
Makefu	Tofua Puletama	22	57.89	Elected
Makefu	Vivaliatama Talagi	16	42.11	
Mutalau	Bill Vakaafi Motufoou	40	67.80	Elected unopposed
Mutalau	Nuihepeni Togakilo	19	32.20	
Namukulu	Jack Willie Lipitoa	—	—	Elected unopposed
Tamakautoga	Andrew Funaki	39	50.65	Elected
Tamakautoga	Ricky Makani	38	49.35	
Toi	Lilivika Muimatagi	8	53.33	Elected
Toi	Dion Taufitu	7	46.67	
Tuapa	Fisa Pihigia	—	—	Elected unopposed
Vaiea	Talaititama Talaiti	—	—	Elected unopposed

== Aftermath ==
Following the election, Young Vivian was re-elected as Premier by the Assembly, winning 17 of 20 votes (his only opponent, O'Love Jacobsen, won the other three).

In forming his cabinet, Vivian dropped his former finance minister Toke Talagi (one of the MPs to win his seat by draw).
