= 2020 Niuean general election =

- 30 May 2020

All 20 members of the Niue Assembly 11 seats needed for a majority
Premier before election
Toke Talagi
Independent
Elected Premier
Dalton Tagelagi
Independent

General elections were held in Niue on 30 May 2020 for the 20 members of the Niue Assembly. The election resulted in the defeat of Premier Toke Talagi, who lost his seat. Fifteen incumbents were re-elected, including three who were unopposed. In Mutalu, a tie between two candidates resulted in one being elected by a coin toss.

Following the elections the Assembly elected Dalton Tagelagi as Premier.

== Electoral system ==
The 20 members of the Assembly are elected by two methods; 14 are elected from single-member consistencies using first-past-the-post voting and six are elected from a single nationwide constituency by multiple non-transferable vote. There are currently no political parties. After the election, the Members of the Assembly elect a Speaker of the Assembly from outside parliament, and a Premier, who must be an MP. The Premier then chooses a Cabinet.

== Campaign ==
A total of 54 candidates contested the elections, of which 26 contested the six common roll seats. All twenty incumbents sought re-election. Three candidates – Mona Ainuu in Tuapa, Enetama Lipitoa in Namukulu and Talaititama Talaiti in Vaiea – were elected unopposed. One of the candidates was former New Zealand MP and mayor of Wellington Mark Blumsky, who had become a naturalised Niuean citizen after ten years' residence.

== Results ==
The Premier Toke Talagi, in office for the previous twelve years, lost his seat, finishing tenth in the six-seat common roll constituency. Five of the elected members were new to the Assembly. After a draw in Mutalau, the result was decided by a coin toss.

The results of the election reduced the number of women in the Assembly dropped from 5 to 3, with only one woman in cabinet, Mona Ainuu.

In a secret ballot, the Assembly elected Dalton Tagelagi as Premier in a 13-7 vote against O'Love Jacobsen, and Hima Douglas was elected Speaker on the third ballot. The new Cabinet was announced on June 11.

=== Common roll ===
Candidate	Votes	%	Notes
Richard Hipa	440	8.58	Elected
Sauni Tongatule	391	7.63	Elected
Crossley Tatui	377	7.35	Re-elected
Stan Kalauni	365	7.12	Re-elected
O'Love Jacobsen	358	6.98	Re-elected
Terry Coe	347	6.77	Re-elected
Billy Talagi	298	5.81	Unseated
Tom Misikea	292	5.70	
Joan Viliamu	278	5.42	Unseated
Toke Talagi	218	4.25	Unseated
Mark Blumsky	218	4.25	
Togia Sioneholo	184	3.59	
Alana Richmond Rex	175	3.41	
Catherine Papani	157	3.06	
Bill Vakaafi	133	2.59	
Rupina Morrissey	123	2.40	
Deve Talagi	115	2.24	
Stanley Tafatu	113	2.20	
Ida Hekesi	107	2.09	
Cherie Tafatu	99	1.93	
John Togahai	89	1.74	
Lagisia Manttan	80	1.56	
Young Vivian	72	1.40	
Merry Iakopo	54	1.05	
Kenneth Green	36	0.70	
Biggle Posimani	8	0.16	
Total	5,127	100.00	
Source: Broadcasting Corporation of Niue

=== By constituency ===
Results for constituencies
Constituency	Candidate	Votes	%	Results
Alofi North	Va'aiga Tukuitonga	37	50.7	Re-elected
Alofi North	Tutuli Heka	36	49.3	
Alofi North	Blank or invalid votes	0	–	
Alofi North	Total	73	100	
Alofi South	Dalton Tagelagi	108	50.9	Re-elected
Alofi South	Charles Togahai	63	29.7	
Alofi South	Laga Lavini	41	19.3	
Alofi South	Blank or invalid votes	0	–	
Alofi South	Total	212	100	
Avatele	Pita Vakanofiti	30	39.5	Elected
Avatele	Atapana Siakimotu	24	31.6	
Avatele	Hetututama Hetutu	22	28.9	
Avatele	Blank or invalid votes	0	–	
Avatele	Total	76	100	
Hakupu	Richie Mautama	52	46.0	Elected
Hakupu	Michael Jackson	35	30.1	Unseated
Hakupu	Fapoi Akesi	26	23.0	
Hakupu	Blank or invalid votes	0	–	
Hakupu	Total	113	100	
Hikutavake	Opili Talafasi	14	56	Re-elected
Hikutavake	Pamela Togiakona	11	44	
Hikutavake	Blank or invalid votes	0	–	
Hikutavake	Total	25	100	
Lakepa	John Operator Tiakia	37	77.1	Elected
Lakepa	Halene Kupa Magatogia	11	22.9	Unseated
Lakepa	Blank or invalid votes	0	–	
Lakepa	Total	48	100	
Liku	Pokotoa Sipeli	36	67.9	Re-elected
Liku	Sionetasi Pulehetoa	17	32.1	
Liku	Blank or invalid votes	0	–	
Liku	Total	53	100	
Makefu	Tofua Puletama	28	63.6	Re-elected
Makefu	Mary Anne Talagi	16	36.4	
Makefu	Blank or invalid votes	0	–	
Makefu	Total	44	100	
Mutalau	Makaseau Ioane	26	50	Elected won on coin toss
Mutalau	Maureen Melekitama	26	50	Unseated lost on coin toss
Mutalau	Blank or invalid votes	0	–	
Mutalau	Total	52	100	
Namukulu	Jack Willie Lipitoa	-	-	Re-elected unopposed
Tamakautoga	Ricky Makani	57	68.7	Elected
Tamakautoga	Peter Funaki	26	31.3	Unseated
Tamakautoga	Blank or invalid votes	0	–	
Tamakautoga	Total	83	100	
Toi	Dion Taufitu	15	68.2	Re-elected
Toi	Heketoa Kaulima	7	31.8	
Toi	Blank or invalid votes	0	–	
Toi	Total	22	100	
Tuapa	Mona Ainu'u	-	-	Re-elected unopposed
Vaiea	Talaititama Talaiti	-	-	Re-elected unopposed

== See also ==
- 17th Niue Assembly
