= 2017 Niuean general election =

- 6 May 2017

All 20 members of the Niue Assembly 11 seats needed for a majority
Premier before election
Toke Talagi
Independent
Elected Premier
Toke Talagi
Independent

General elections were held in Niue on 6 May 2017.

== Electoral system ==
The 20 members of the Assembly are elected by two methods; 14 are elected from single-member consistencies and six are elected from a single nationwide constituency. Both types of seat use first-past-the-post voting.

== Results ==
=== Nationwide seats ===
Candidate	Votes	%	Notes
O'Love Jacobsen	452	9.25	Elected
Terry Coe	431	8.82	Re-elected
Toke Talagi	424	8.68	Re-elected
Stan Kalauni	407	8.33	Re-elected
Crossley Tatui	364	7.45	Re-elected
Joan Tahafa-Viliamu	296	6.06	Re-elected
Sauni Tongatule	282	5.77	
Willie Saniteli	257	5.26	
Dessyo Sioneholo	230	4.71	
Togia Sioneholo	227	4.64	Unseated
Sisilia Talagi	217	4.44	
Igasiatama Mokole	211	4.32	
Moka Tano Puleosi	159	3.25	
Maru Talagi	145	2.97	
Ida Hekesi	134	2.74	
Norman Mitimeti	129	2.64	
Cherie Tafatu	127	2.60	
Catherine Papani	106	2.17	
Rozlyn Hipa	99	2.03	
Charles Magatogia	66	1.35	
Merry Anno Lui Iakopo	56	1.15	
Lagisia Manttan	41	0.84	
Tama Posimani	27	0.55	
Total	4,887	100.00	
Source: Tala Niue

=== Constituency seats ===
Constituency	Candidate	Votes	Notes
Alofi North	Va'aiga Tukuitonga	44	Re-elected
Alofi North	Tutuli Heka	36	
Alofi South	Dalton Tagelagi	151	Re-elected
Alofi South	Laga Lavini	59	
Avatele	Billy Talagi	41	Re-elected
Avatele	Poimamao Vakanofiti	33	
Hakupu	Michael Jackson	56	Re-elected
Hakupu	Young Vivian	48	Lost seat
Hikutavake	Opili Talafasi	16	Re-elected
Hikutavake	Ian Hipa	11	
Lakepa	Halene Kupa Magatogia	31	Re-elected
Lakepa	Bob Tunifo Talagi	15	
Liku	Pokotoa Sipeli	–	Re-elected unopposed
Makefu	Tofua Puletama	24	Re-elected
Makefu	Deve KoloseTalagi	16	
Mutalau	Maureen Melekitama	19	Elected (coin-toss)
Mutalau	Bill Vakaafi Motufoou	19	Unseated (coin-toss)
Mutalau	Makaseau Ioane	15	
Namukulu	Jack Willie Lipitoa	–	Re-elected unopposed
Tamakautoga	Andrew Funaki	39	Elected
Tamakautoga	Muiaki Makani	34	
Toi	Dion Taufitu	10	Re-elected
Toi	Sione Kaulima	4	
Tuapa	Mona Ainu'u	23	Elected
Tuapa	Krypton Okesene	13	
Tuapa	Halafoou Mokalei	9	
Tuapa	Hale Ikitule	7	
Vaiea	Talititama Taliati	–	Re-elected unopposed
Source: Tala Niue
