= Richmond Lisimoni-Togahai =

Niuean politician and educator

Member of the Niue Assembly for the Common Roll
- Incumbent
- Assumed office 2 May 2026

Personal details
- Born: Richmond Birtha Lisimoni-Togahai

Richmond Birtha Lisimoni-Togahai is a Niuean politician and educator. She was first elected to the Niue Assembly in 2026.

== Life and career ==
Lisimoni-Togahai grew up in Namukulu. Her parents, Richmond Lagaluga (née Lisimoni) and Tufakava served as pastors in the village from 1972 to 1985. Lisimoni-Togahai was educated at Niue High School, the University of the South Pacific, and the University of Southern Queensland. She has previously served as the Director of Education.

Lisimoni-Togahai previously ran in the 2023 Niuean general election for a seat on the Common Roll. Preliminary results showed her tied with Sonya Talagi at 364 votes each; however, a recount later showed the former trailing behind Talagi by a margin of two votes, and Talagi was declared the winner. Lisimoni-Togahai lost four votes in the recount: two in Mutalau, and one each in Hikutavake and Tuapa. Following the recount, she filed a petition in the High Court for a recount in those three villages, claiming that Darren Tohovaka, the Chief Electoral Officer of Niue, neither allowed her to nominate a scrutineer nor gave written notice to have one present.
