= Ainuu =

Ainuu is a surname. Notable people with the surname include:

- David Ainuʻu (born 1999), American Samoan rugby union player
- Faaolesa Katopau Ainuu (fl. 2008), Samoan politician
- Mona Ainuu (fl. 2017), Niuean politician
