= John Operator Tiakia =

Niuean (South Pacific) politician

Member of the Niuean Parliament for Lakepa
- In office 30 May 2020 – 29 April 2023
- Succeeded by: Rhonda Tiakia Tomailuga

Member of the Niuean Parliament for Lakepa
- In office 23 February 1996 – 30 April 2005
- Preceded by: Halene Kupa Magatogia
- Succeeded by: Halene Kupa Magatogia

John Operator Tiakia is a Niuean politician and former member of the Niue Assembly. He is the father of MP Rhonda Tiakia Tomailuga.

Tiakia worked as a civil servant for the Department of Public Works. He was elected to the Niue Assembly at the 1996 Niuean general election, and served as MP for Lakepa until 2005. After leaving parliament he was appointed Public Service Commissioner. Following the 2011 election he was unsuccessfully nominated by opposition MP Terry Coe for the position of Speaker.

He was re-elected at the 2020 election. In February 2022 he was appointed as Member Assisting the Minister of Infrastructure. He retired at the 2023 election, and was succeeded in his seat by his daughter, Rhonda Tiakia Tomailuga.
