= Korea–Pacific Islands Summit =

- Host country: South Korea
- Date: May 29–30, 2023
- Cities: Seoul
- Participants: 19 countries: Pacific Islands Forum; Australia; Cook Islands; Fiji; French Polynesia; Kiribati; Marshall Islands; Micronesia; Nauru; New Caledonia; New Zealand; Niue; Palau; Papua New Guinea; Samoa; Solomon Islands; Tonga; Tuvalu; Vanuatu; South Korea (hosts)

The Korea–Pacific Islands Summit was a meeting hosted by President of South Korea Yoon Suk-yeol with leaders of Pacific Islands Forum members held during May 29–30, 2023 in Seoul, South Korea. the summit was brought forth after 5 meetings of the participants the last of in 2022 when the involved parties agreed to elevate relations to summit status.

== Participants ==
All heads of state and ministers from 18 Pacific Islands Forum member countries attended, excluding Micronesia, which was unable to attend due to domestic circumstances such as typhoon damage.

=== Participating countries ===
- Australia
- Cook Islands
- Fiji
- French Polynesia
- Kiribati
- Marshall Islands
- Micronesia
- Nauru
- New Caledonia
- New Zealand
- Niue
- Palau
- Papua New Guinea
- Samoa
- Solomon Islands
- South Korea (hosts)
- Tonga
- Tuvalu
- Vanuatu

== Attendees ==
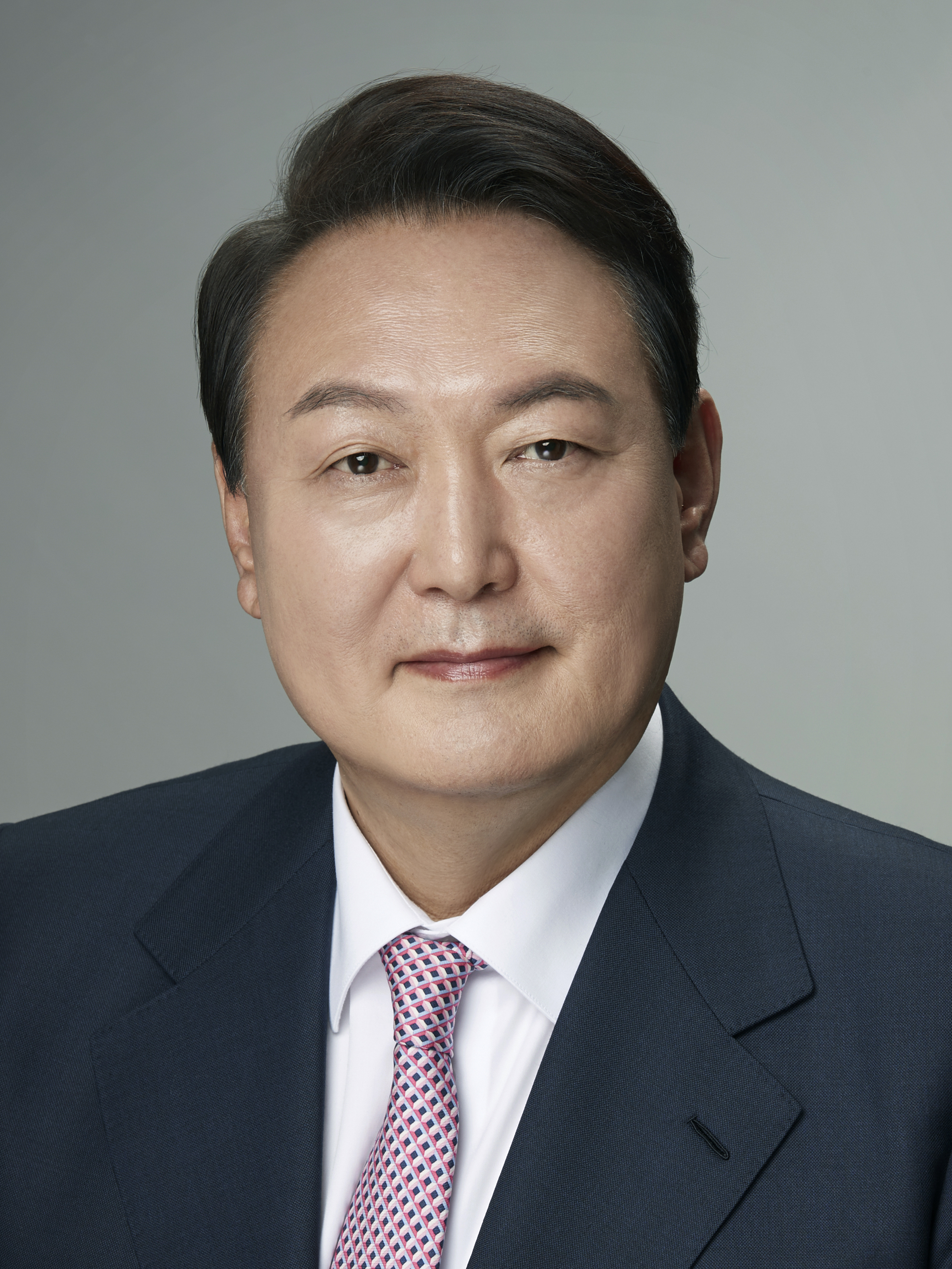
(South Korea) South Korea
President
Yoon Suk Yeol

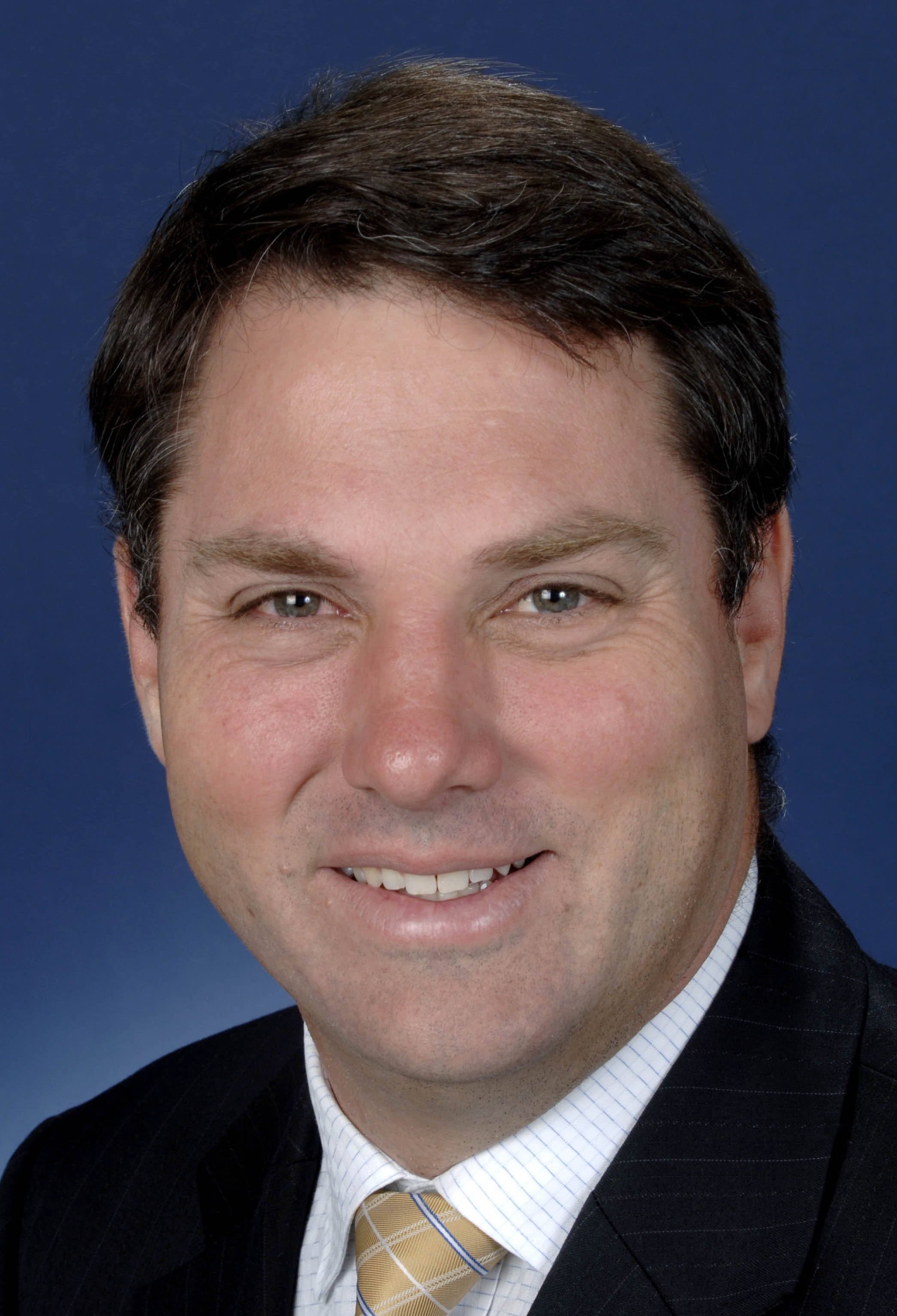
(Australia) Australia
Deputy Prime Minister Richard Marles

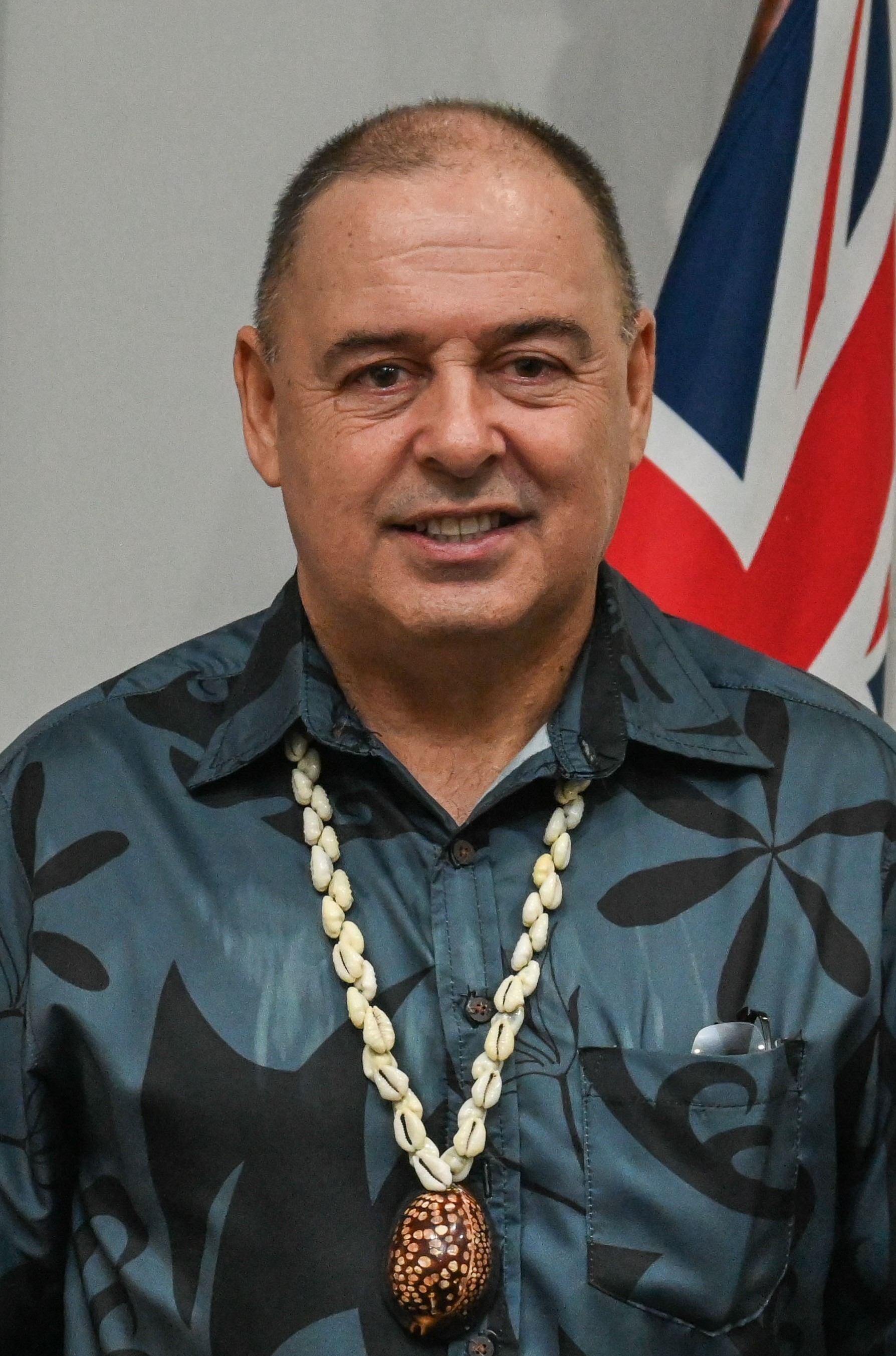
(Cook Islands) Cook Islands
Prime Minister
Mark Brown

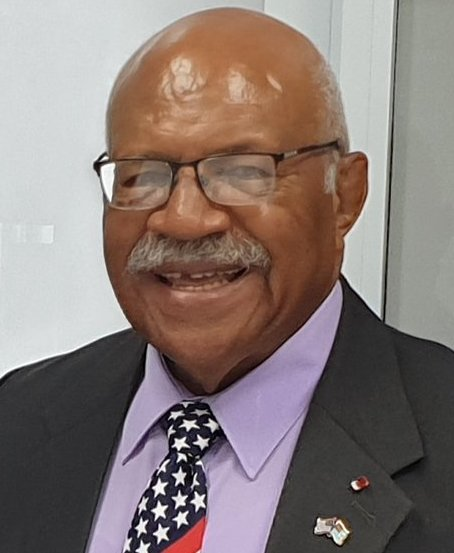
(Fiji) Fiji
Prime Minister
Sitiveni Rabuka

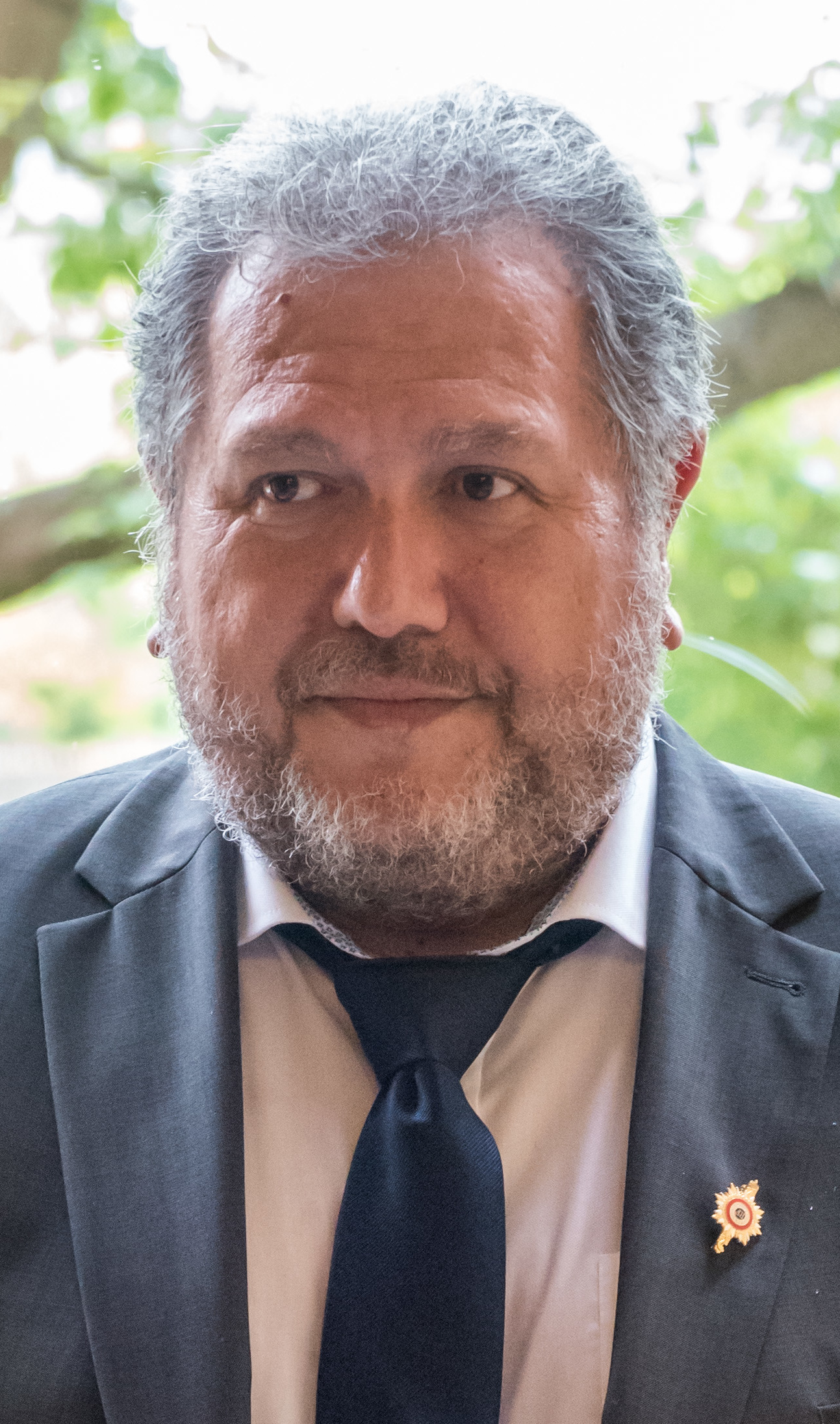
(French Polynesia) French Polynesia
President
Moetai Brotherson

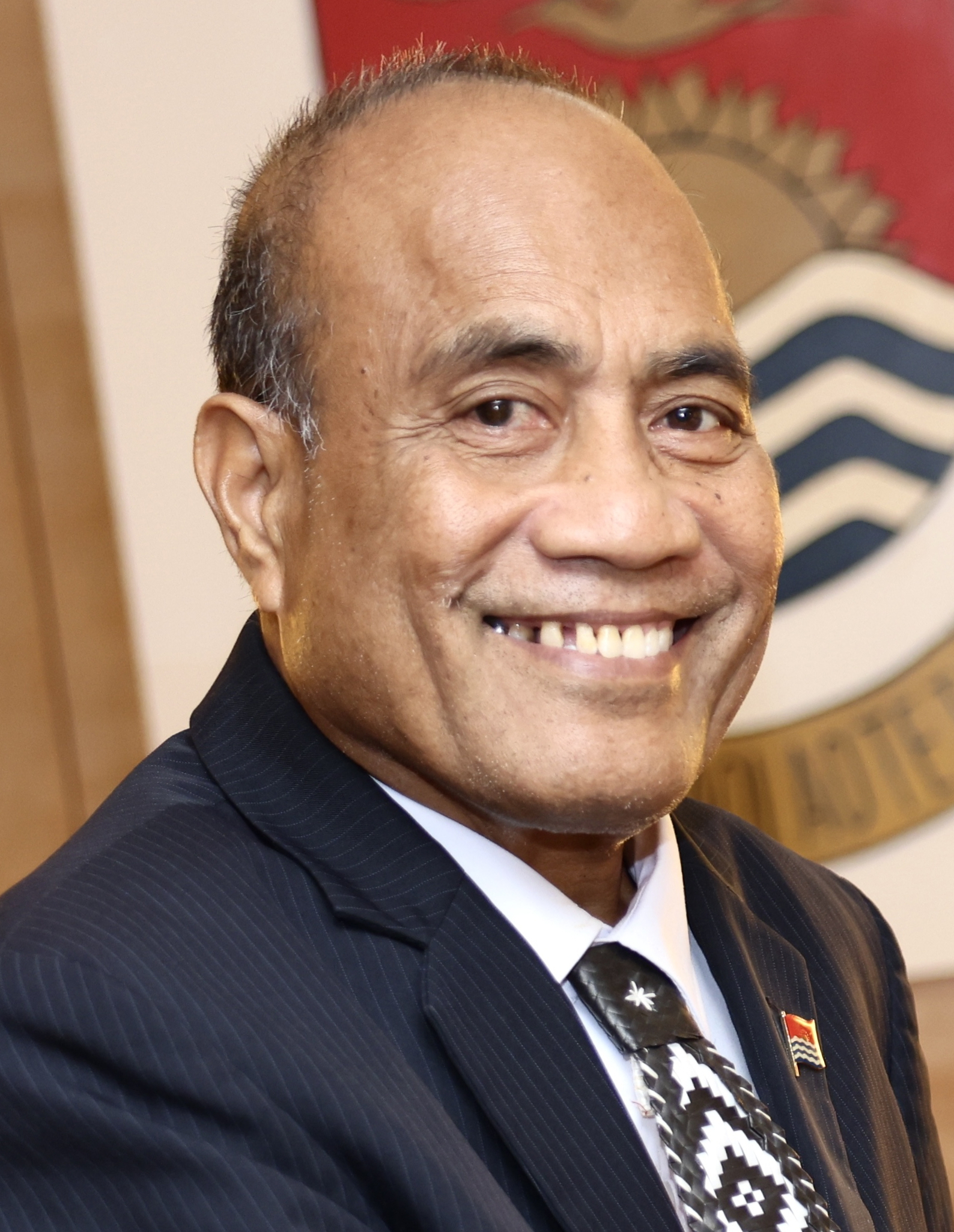
(Kiribati) Kiribati
President
Taneti Maamau

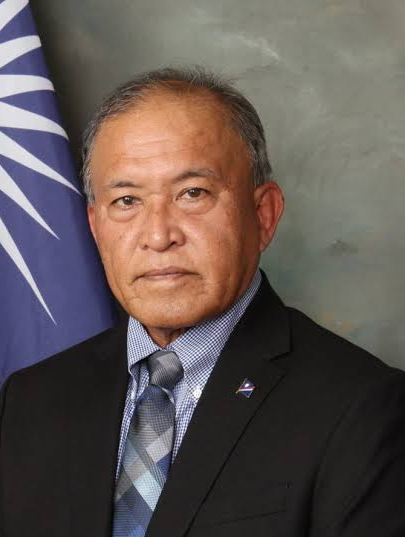
(Marshall Islands) Marshall Islands
President
David Kabua

(Nauru) Nauru
Minister for Health
Timothy Ika

(New Caledonia) New Caledonia
President
Louis Mapou

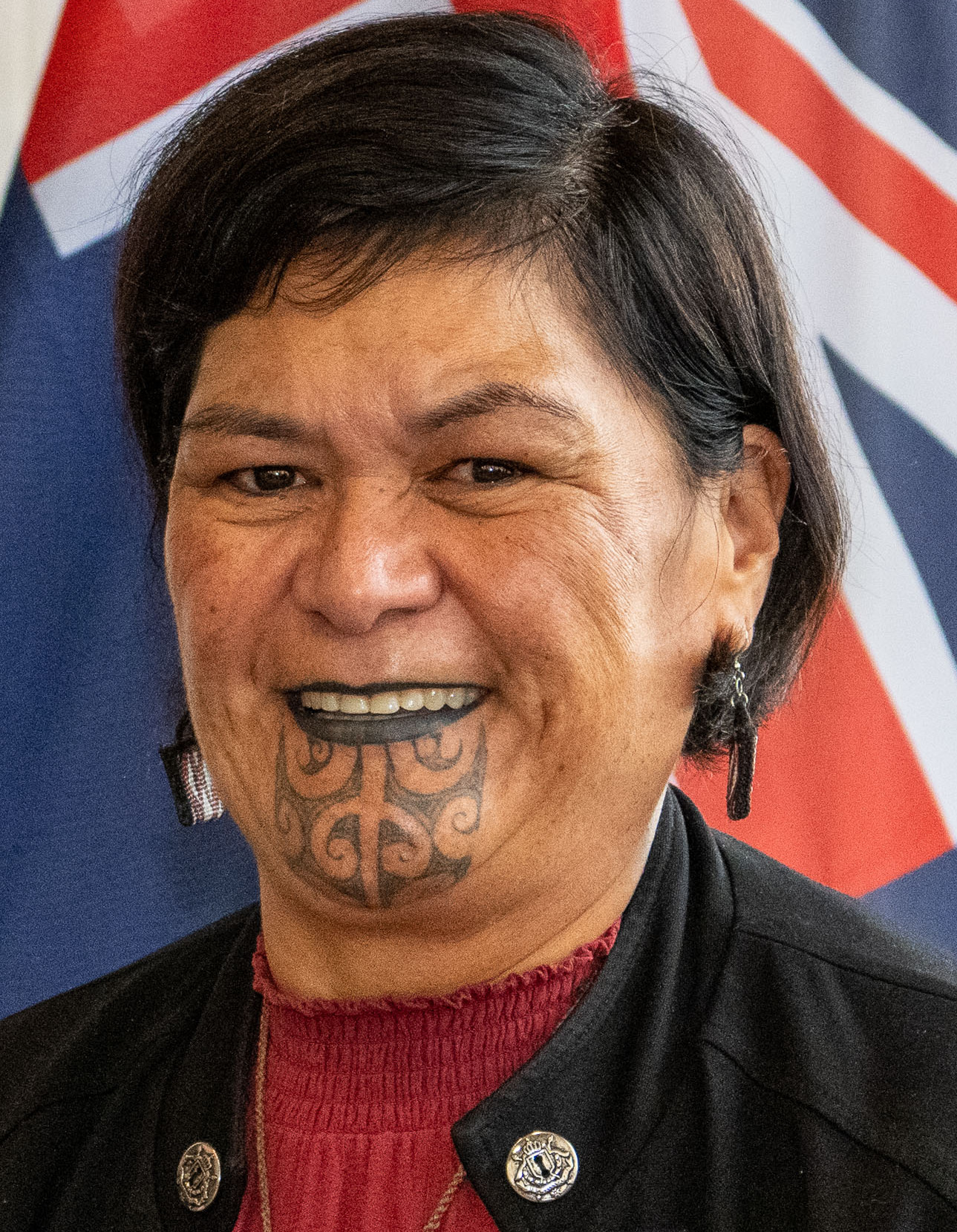
(New Zealand) New Zealand
Minister of Foreign Affairs
Nanaia Mahuta

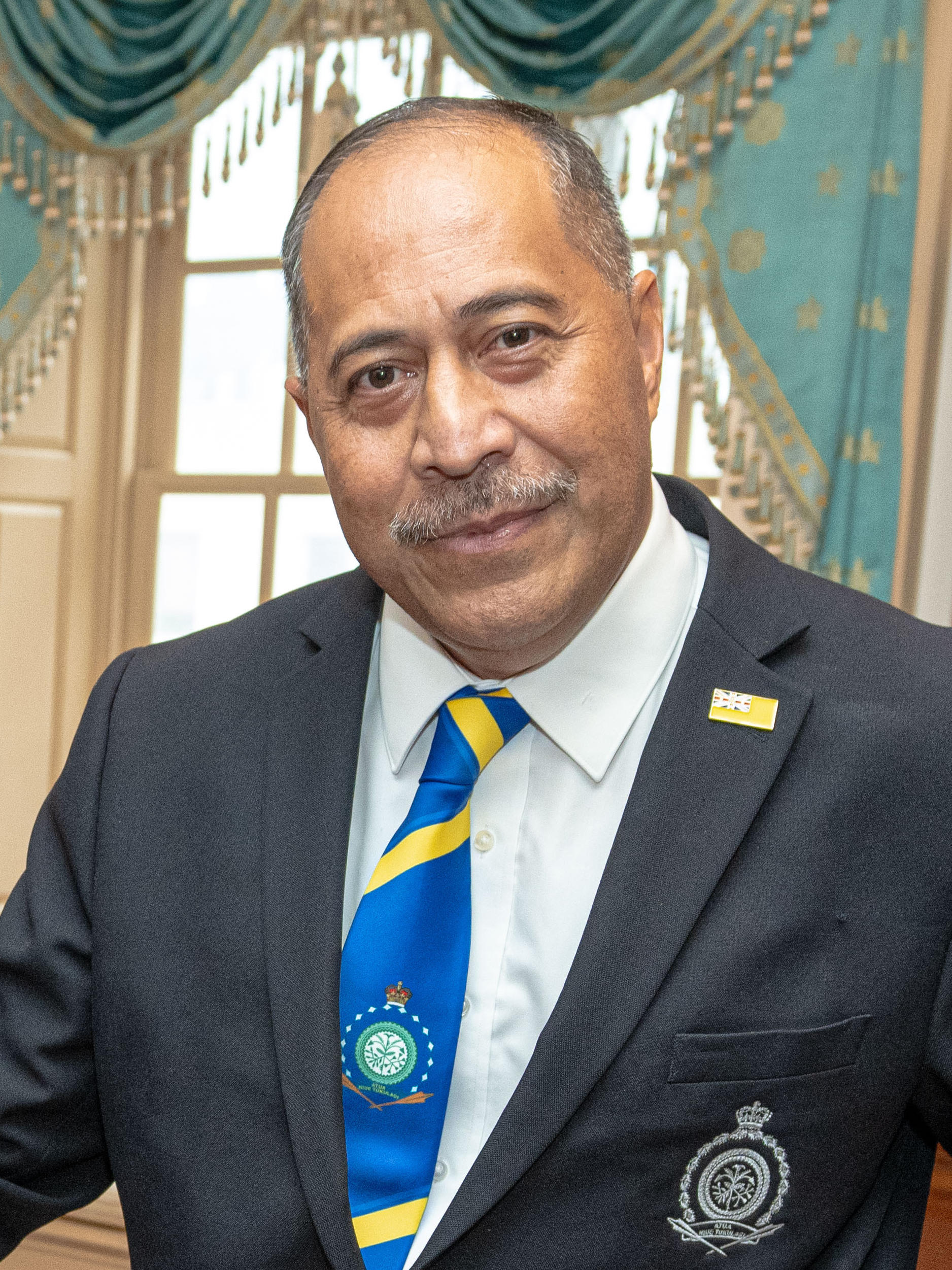
(Niue) Niue
Premier
Dalton Tagelagi

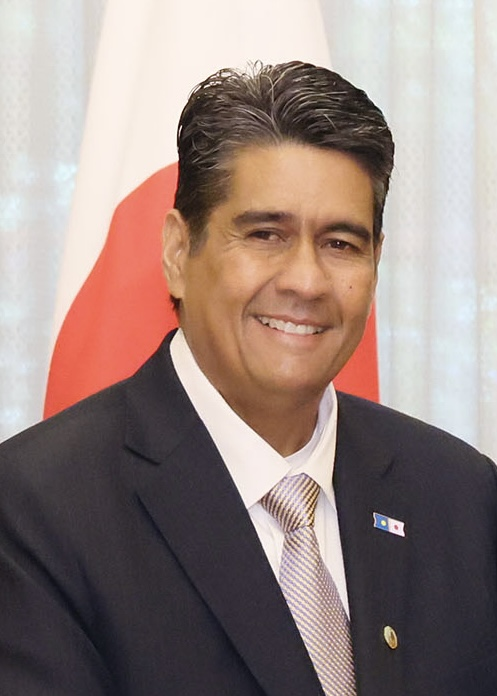
(Palau) Palau
President
Surangel Whipps Jr.

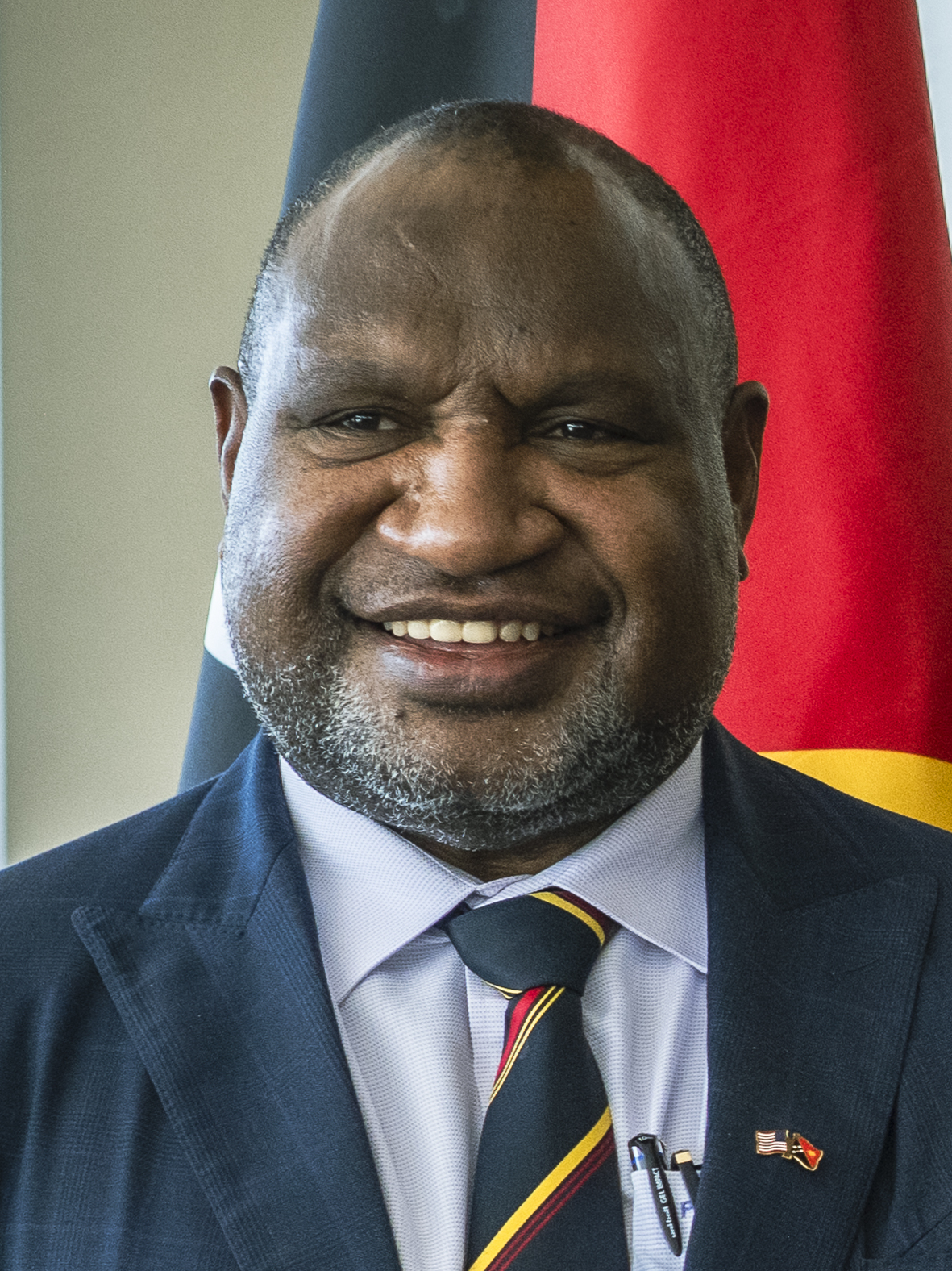
(Papua New Guinea) Papua New Guinea
Prime Minister
James Marape

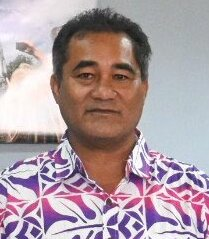
(Samoa) Samoa
Minister of Natural Resources and Environment
Toeolesulusulu Cedric Schuster

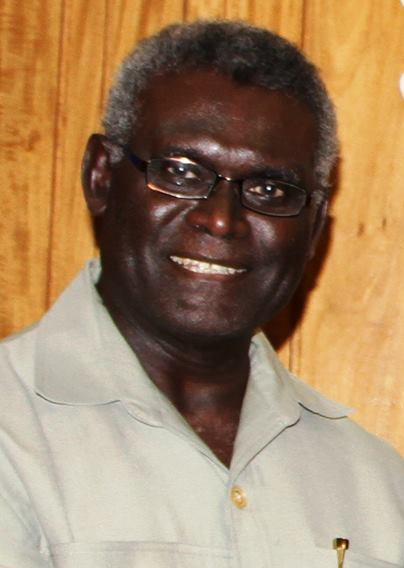
(Solomon Islands) Solomon Islands
Prime Minister
Manasseh Sogavare

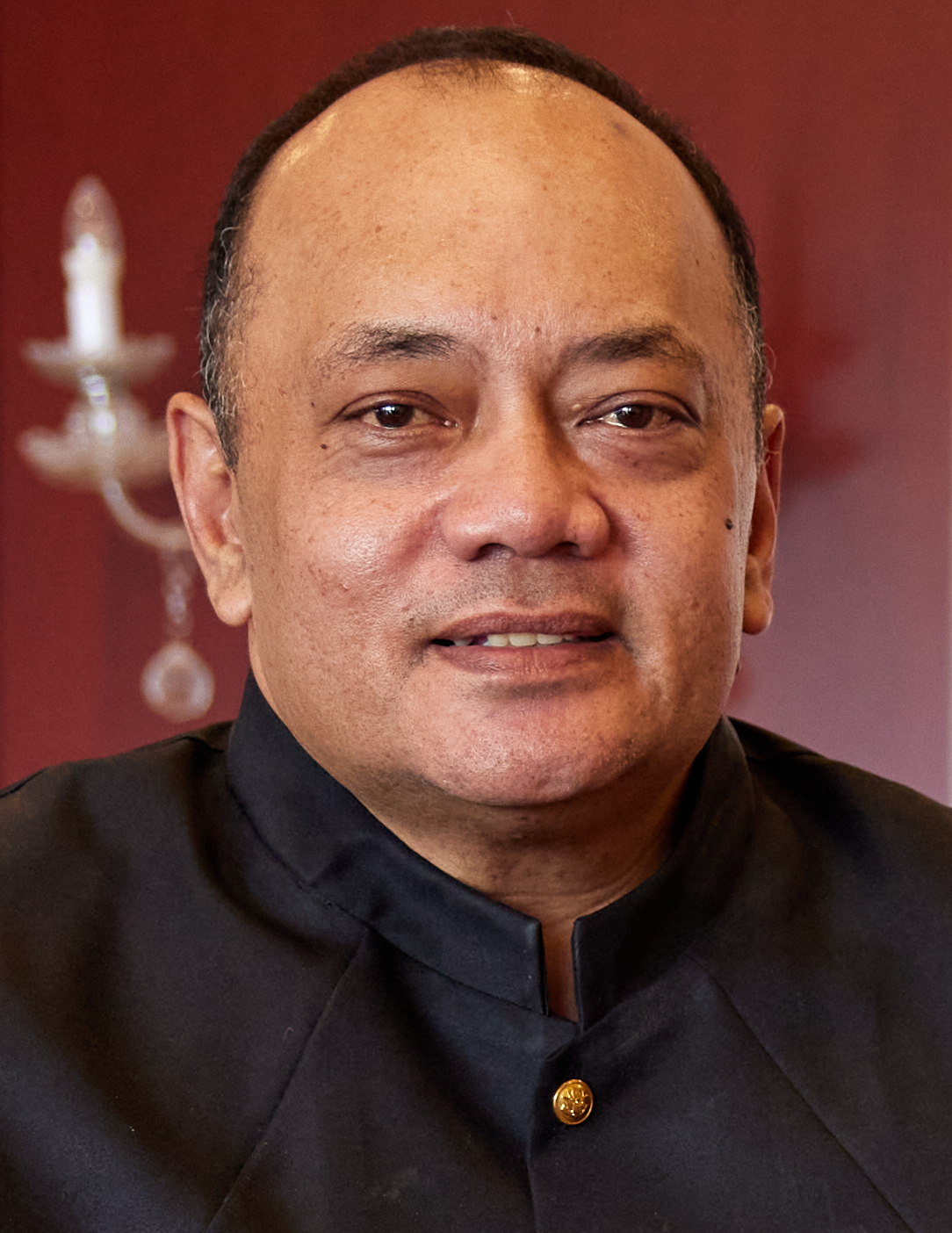
(Tonga) Tonga
Prime Minister
Siaosi Sovaleni

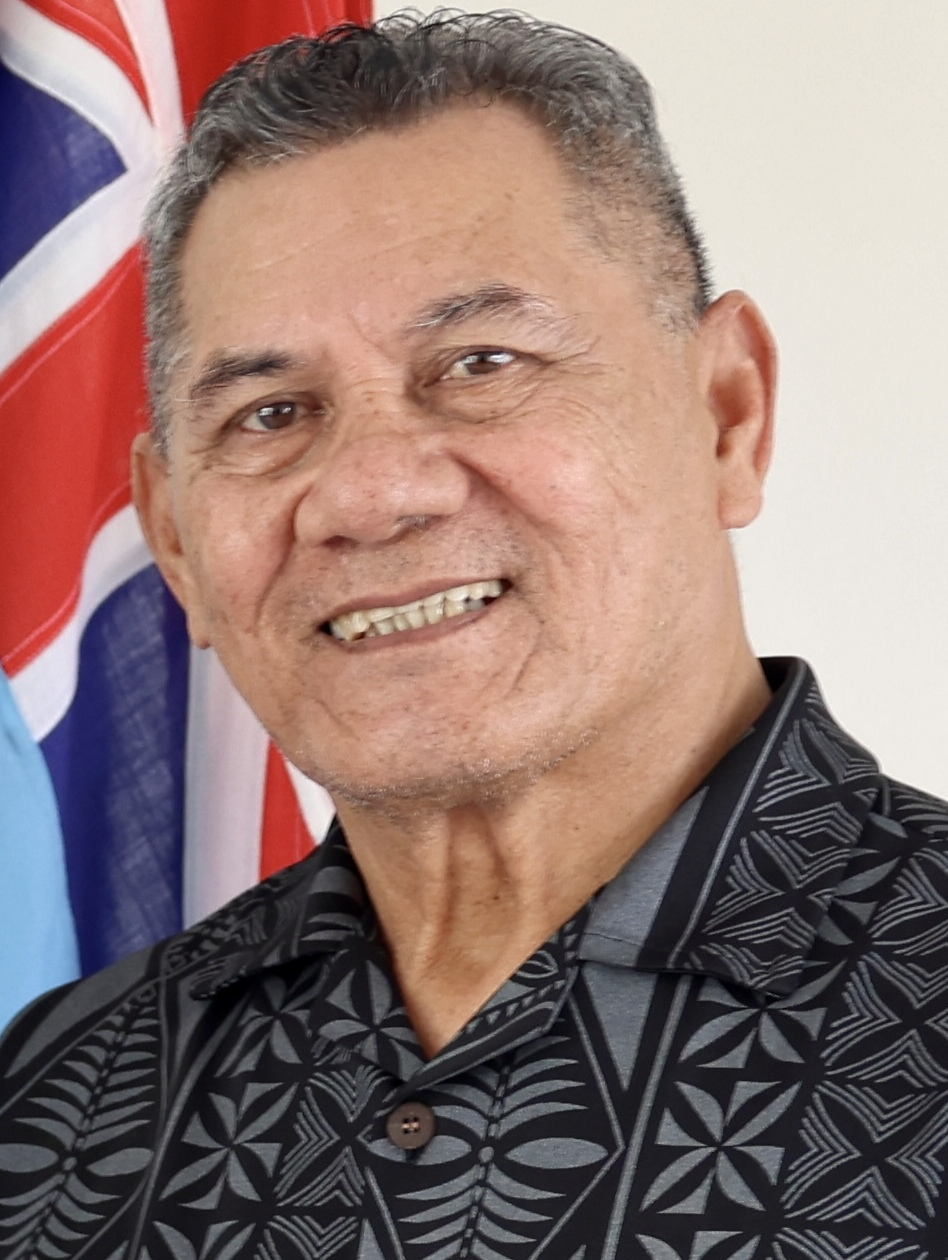
(Tuvalu) Tuvalu
Prime Minister
Kausea Natano

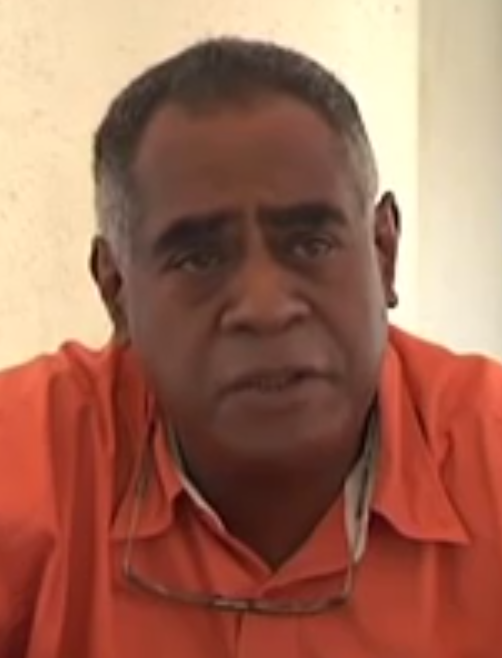
(Vanuatu) Vanuatu
Prime Minister
Ishmael Kalsakau
