= 2023 Niuean general election =

- 29 April 2023

All 20 members of the Niue Assembly 11 seats needed for a majority
Premier before election
Dalton Tagelagi
Independent
Elected Premier
Dalton Tagelagi
Independent

General elections were held in Niue on 29 April 2023. The elections were originally planned to be held early, in late February or early March. Eight new MPs and six women were elected.

Following the elections the Assembly elected Dalton Tagelagi as Premier.

== Electoral system ==
The 20 members of the Assembly are elected by two methods; 14 are elected from single-member consistencies using first-past-the-post voting and six are elected from a single nationwide constituency by multiple non-transferable vote. There are currently no political parties. After the election, the Members of the Assembly elect a Speaker of the Assembly from outside parliament, and a Premier, who must be an MP. The Premier then chooses a Cabinet.

In 2023, the candidate nomination fee was increased from NZ$11 to NZ$200.

== Campaign ==
A total of 42 candidates contested the election, of which 17 contested the six common roll seats.

== Results ==
Three of the common-roll seats went to newcomers, with the initial results indicating that the final seat would be decided by a coin-toss. The final results on 3 May did not show a tie, with Sonya Talagi winning the last seat on the common roll by two votes.

Six candidates, including Premier Dalton Tagelagi, were elected unopposed. Six women were elected. Three sitting MPs were unseated.

In a secret ballot, the Assembly re-elected Dalton Tagelagi as Premier in a 16-4 vote against O'Love Jacobsen. Tagelagi appointed his Cabinet on 12 May, the first gender-balanced Cabinet in Niuean history.

=== Common roll ===
Candidate	Votes	%	Notes
Crossley Tatui	409	48.81	Re-elected
Emani Fakaotimanava-Lui	394	47.02	Elected
Sinahemana Hekau	387	46.18	Elected
Billy Talagi	366	43.68	Re-elected
O'Love Jacobsen	364	43.44	Re-elected
Sonya Talagi	362	43.20	Elected
Birtha Lisimoni-Togahai	360	42.96	
Terry Coe	333	39.74	Unseated
Fapoi Akesi	313	37.35	
Tamuta Utalo	233	27.80	
Togia Sioneholo	207	24.70	
Victoria Posimani-Kalauni	191	22.79	
Ettie Lotomaanu P Pasene-Mizziebo	188	22.43	
Julie Sophai S M T Talagi-Funaki	183	21.84	
Charlie J K Tohovaka	165	19.69	
Mark Blumsky	158	18.85	
Fisa Igilisi Pihigia	108	12.89	
Total	4,721	100.00	
Valid votes	838	95.34	
Invalid/blank votes	41	4.66	
Total votes	879	100.00	
Registered voters/turnout	1,170	75.13	
Source: Chief Electoral Officer

==== By constituency ====
Candidate	AS	TAMA	AVTL	Vaiea	HKP	Liku	LKP	MTL	Toi	HIKU	NAMU	Tuapa	MKF	AN
Crossley Tatui	90	40	30	9	84	26	16	31	10	12	2	17	17	25
Emani Fakaotimanava-Lui	125	21	26	16	29	24	20	14	10	11	1	24	16	57
Sinahemana Hekau	108	30	21	7	34	43	22	24	10	9	3	17	18	41
Billy Talagi	77	45	55	10	28	28	20	11	2	8	1	44	8	29
O'Love Jacobsen	98	44	25	20	27	24	19	17	10	8	0	24	14	34
Sonya Talagi	70	30	25	11	40	21	21	27	13	14	5	42	13	30
Birtha Lisimoni-Togahai	83	31	42	1	47	20	22	22	10	8	5	24	11	34
Terry Coe	86	27	30	22	16	19	24	12	12	14	4	21	14	32
Fapoi Akesi	40	24	23	12	85	22	32	10	5	5	5	19	9	22
Tamuta Utalo	54	17	14	3	15	26	26	20	13	9	1	9	14	12
Togia Sioneholo	47	13	15	0	25	5	12	17	8	8	4	19	12	22
Victoria Posimani-Kalauni	31	17	11	2	10	8	9	25	6	8	3	44	9	8
Julie Sophai S M T Talagi-Funaki	63	15	17	2	17	8	13	8	2	5	0	5	13	20
Ettie Lotomaanu P Pasene-Mizziebo	71	11	9	3	18	11	9	4	3	7	1	6	7	23
Charlie J K Tohovaka	29	11	18	1	12	14	10	16	5	3	0	15	17	14
Mark Blumsky	33	15	9	17	9	12	13	9	7	2	0	8	3	21
Fisa Igilisi Pihigia	16	8	7	1	7	11	5	7	0	1	1	38	2	3
Invalid	3	4	1	2	2	2	0	2	2	3	0	2	3	2
Spoilt	3	0	0	1	1	1	0	0	1	0	0	2	2	2
Total votes	209	79	69	26	93	59	52	49	24	25	6	68	38	82
Registered	276	93	88	40	128	78	76	81	31	35	6	88	50	100
Source: Chief Electoral Officer

=== Constituencies ===
Results for constituencies
Constituency	Candidate	Votes	%	Results
Alofi North	Tutuli Heka	35	44.87	Elected
Alofi North	Alan Puleoti	26	33.33	
Alofi North	Stanley Frederick Tafatu	17	21.79	
Alofi North	Blank or invalid votes	2	2.56	
Alofi North	Total	78		
Alofi South	Dalton Tagelagi			Re-elected unopposed
Avatele	Pita Vakanofiti	28	40.58	Re-elected
Avatele	Hetututama Hetutu	26	37.68	
Avatele	Ketiligi Saniteli Fereti	13	18.84	
Avatele	Blank or invalid votes	2	2.90	
Avatele	Total	69		
Hakupu	Richie Mautama			Re-elected unopposed
Hikutavake	Ian Hipa	9	37.50	Elected
Hikutavake	Masiniholo Lagaloga	5	20.83	
Hikutavake	Opili Talafasi	8	33.33	Unseated
Hikutavake	Blank or invalid votes	2	8.33	
Hikutavake	Total	24		
Lakepa	Rhonda Tiakia Tomailuga	35	67.31	Elected
Lakepa	Shield Palahetogia	16	30.77	
Lakepa	Blank or invalid votes	1	1.92	
Lakepa	Total	52		
Liku	Logopati Seumanu	31	54.39	Elected
Liku	Sionetasi Pulehetoa	26	45.61	
Liku	Blank or invalid votes	0	0.00	
Liku	Total	57		
Makefu	Tofua Puletama	22	61.11	Re-elected
Makefu	Tioneatali Kemusiaki Lolani	14	38.89	
Makefu	Blank or invalid votes	0	0.00	
Makefu	Total	36		
Mutalau	Maureen Melekitama	29	59.18	Elected
Mutalau	Makaseau Ioane	18	36.73	Unseated
Mutalau	Blank or invalid votes	2	4.08	
Mutalau	Total	49		
Namukulu	Sione Sionetuato			Elected unopposed
Tamakautoga	Ricky Makani	46	60.52	Re-elected
Tamakautoga	Peter Funaki	25	32.89	
Tamakautoga	Blank or invalid votes	5	6.58	
Tamakautoga	Total	76		
Toi	Dion Taufitu			Re-elected unopposed
Tuapa	Mona Ainuu			Re-elected unopposed
Vaiea	Talaititama Talaiti			Re-elected unopposed

== See also ==
- 18th Niue Assembly
