= Sauni Tongatule =

Niuean politician

Sauni Tongatule is a former Niuean politician and Cabinet Minister.

He was first elected in 2020 where he was a candidate on the common roll, which is the single nationwide constituency, where he placed second with 391 votes. Following the election Tongatule was appointed minister for social services and education by the new premier, Dalton Tagelagi.

Prior to entering parliament, Tongatule was the director of the department of the environment.

Tongatule retired from politics at the 2023 election.
