= Pita Vakanofiti =

Niuean politician

Member of the Niuean Parliament for Avatele
- Incumbent
- Assumed office 30 May 2020
- Preceded by: Billy Talagi

Pita Poimamao Vakanofiti is a Niuean politician and Member of the Niue Assembly.

He stood for the Niue Assembly in the 2017 Niuean general election, but lost to Billy Talagi. He was elected in the 2020 Niuean general election, defeating former Speaker Atapana Siakimotu in the seat of Avatele. He was re-elected in the 2023 election.
