= Maureen Melekitama =

Niuean civil servant and politician

Member of the Niuean Parliament for Mutalau
- Incumbent
- Assumed office 29 April 2023
- Preceded by: Makaseau Ioane

Member of the Niuean Parliament for Mutalau
- In office 6 May 2017 – 30 May 2020
- Preceded by: Bill Vakaafi Motufoou
- Succeeded by: Makaseau Ioane

Florence Maureen Melekitama is a Niuean civil servant and politician.

Melekitama was a civil servant who worked for the tax office. She was first elected to the Niue Assembly at the 2017 Niuean general election, when she tied with rival candidate Makaseau Ioane but had her name drawn by lot. She lost the seat to Ioane at the 2020 election, again on a hat-draw. Following her electoral defeat she was appointed Internal Auditor by the Niuean Government.

She was re-elected to the Assembly at the 2023 election. She was subsequently appointed as Member Assisting the Minister to Sonya Talagi, the Minister for Education and Social Services.
