= Tutuli Heka =

Niuean politician

Member of the Niuean Parliament for Alofi North
- Incumbent
- Assumed office 29 April 2023
- Preceded by: Va'aiga Tukuitonga

Tutuli Heka is a Niuean civil servant, politician and Member of the Niue Assembly.

In November 2008, Hela was appointed director of Niue Telecom. He served on the Alofi North village council until he resigned in 2020 after he was sworn in as a land commissioner of the High Court of Niue.

Heka ran unsuccessfully for the Niue Assembly in the seat of Alofi North in the 2017 and 2020 elections. He was elected in the 2023 Niuean general election following the retirement of incumbent Va'aiga Tukuitonga.
