= Sione Sionetuato =

Niuean religious leader and politician

Member of the Niuean Parliament for Namukulu
- Incumbent
- Assumed office 29 April 2023
- Preceded by: Jack Willie Lipitoa

Sione Silapea Sionetuato is a Niuean religious leader, politician, and Member of the Niue Assembly.

Sionetuato is a church elder from the village of Namukulu. He was first elected to the Niue Assembly in the 2023 Niuean general election, being elected unopposed.
