= Makaseau Ioane =

Niuean politician

Member of the Niuean Parliament for Mutalau
- In office 30 May 2020 – 29 April 2023
- Preceded by: Maureen Melekitama
- Succeeded by: Maureen Melekitama

Makaseau Ioane is a Niuean politician and former Member of the Niue Assembly.

Ioane contested the 2017 Niuean general election in the seat of Mutalau, when she tied with rival candidate Maureen Melekitama but lost the seat on a hat-draw. She won the seat from Melekitama at the 2020 election, again on a hat-draw. She lost the seat at the 2023 election.
