= Rhonda Tiakia Tomailuga =

Niuean politician

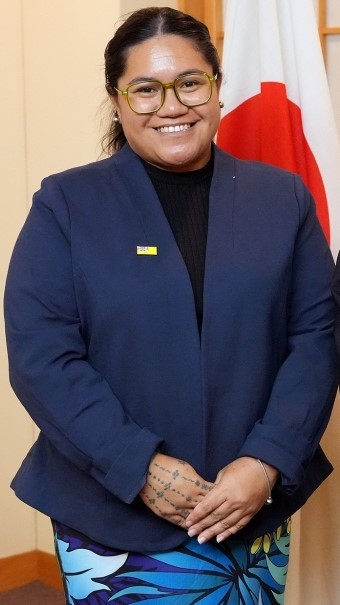
- in February 2026

Member of the Niuean Parliament for Lakepa
- Incumbent
- Assumed office 29 April 2023
- Preceded by: John Operator Tiakia

Personal details
- Born: 1988 or 1989 (age 37–38)

Rhonda Tiakia Tomailuga (born 1988 or 1989) is a Niuean politician and member of the Niue Assembly. She is the daughter of former MP John Operator Tiakia.

Tiakia-Tomailuga previously worked as a communications officer for the Niuean Government. She was first elected to the Niue Assembly in the 2023 Niuean general election, defeating Shield Utalo Palahetogia in her father's seat of Lakepa.
