= Logopati Seumanu =

Niuean politician

Member of the Niuean Parliament for Liku
- Incumbent
- Assumed office 29 April 2023
- Preceded by: Pokotoa Sipeli

Logopati Seumanu is a Niuean civil servant, politician and Member of the Niue Assembly.

Seumanu worked as a conservation officer for Niue's Department of the Environment. He was first elected to the Niue Assembly in the 2023 Niuean general election.
