= Sinahemana Hekau =

Niuean lawyer and politician

Member of the Niuean Parliament for Common roll
- Incumbent
- Assumed office 29 April 2023

Sinahemana Hekau is a Niuean lawyer and politician. In 2004 she was the winner of Miss South Pacific. She is the daughter of former MP Makamau Hekau.

Hekau trained as a lawyer at the University of the South Pacific. She later completed a master of Laws at Victoria University of Wellington. She worked as a lawyer for the Niuean government before entering private practice.

She was first elected to the Niue Assembly in the 2023 Niuean general election, coming third on the common roll. She was subsequently appointed Member Assisting the Minister to Premier Dalton Tagelagi.
