= Sonya Talagi =

Niuean politician

Minister for Education and Social Services
- Incumbent
- Assumed office 12 May 2023
- Prime Minister: Dalton Tagelagi
- Preceded by: Sauni Tongatule

Member of the Niuean Parliament for Common Roll
- Incumbent
- Assumed office 29 April 2023

Personal details
- Parent: Toke Talagi (father)
- Relatives: Dalton Tagelagi (half-brother)

Sonya Talagi is a Niuean politician and Cabinet Minister. She is the daughter of former Premier of Niue Toke Talagi.

Talagi was a public servant, working as Director of Transport for the Niuean Government. She was first elected to the Niue Assembly in the 2023 Niuean general election. While initial results showed her drawing with Richmond Lisimoni-Togahai for the last place on the common roll, final results gave her a two-vote lead.

On 12 May 2023 she was appointed to the Cabinet of Dalton Tagelagi, her half-brother, as Minister for Education and Social Services.
