= Ian Hipa =

Niuean politician

Member of the Niuean Parliament for Hikutavake
- Incumbent
- Assumed office 29 April 2023
- Preceded by: Opili Talafasi

Ian Hipa is a Niuean businessman, politician and Member of the Niue Assembly. He is the brother of former MP Richard Hipa.

Hipa worked as an electrician. In July 2012 he was prosecuted for arson over a series of fires in Hikutavake, one of which destroyed his home. The charges were dismissed due to inconsistencies in the evidence.

He was first elected to the Niue Assembly in the 2023 Niuean general election in the village of Hikutavake, defeating incumbent Opili Talafasi by a single vote.
