= Billy Talagi =

Niuean politician

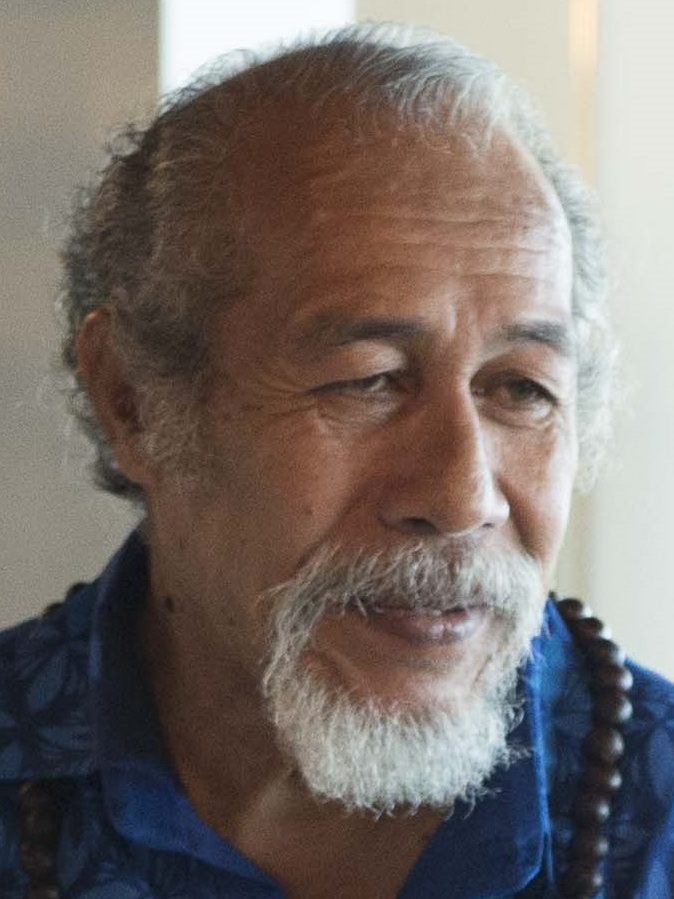
- Billy Talagi in 2017

Speaker of the Niue Assembly
- Incumbent
- Assumed office 13 May 2026
- Preceded by: Hima Douglas

Minister for Education and Social Services
- In office 6 May 2017 – 30 May 2020
- Prime Minister: Toke Talagi
- Preceded by: Pokotoa Sipeli
- Succeeded by: Sauni Tongatule

Minister of Natural Resources
- In office 30 April 2014 – 6 May 2017
- Succeeded by: Dalton Tagelagi

Member of the Niuean Parliament for Common Roll
- In office 29 April 2023 – 12 May 2026

Member of the Niuean Parliament for Avatele
- In office 19 March 1999 – 30 May 2020
- Preceded by: Aokuso Pavihi
- Succeeded by: Poimamao Vakanofisi

Member of the Niuean Parliament for Common Roll
- In office 15 February 1997 – 19 March 1999

Personal details
- Party: None

Billy Graham Talagi is a Niuean politician, former member of the Niue Assembly, and current speaker of the Niue Assembly. He is the brother of former Premier of Niue Toke Talagi.

== Career ==
Talagi was first elected to the Niue Assembly in a 1997 by-election. He has represented the village of Avatele in the Niue Assembly continuously since 1999. In 2005, 2008, and 2014 he was elected unopposed. In 2014 he was made Minister of Natural Resources in the Cabinet of Toke Talagi. In 2017 he was made Minister for Education and Social Services. In 2019 he served as Acting Prime Minister while Toke Talagi was receiving medical treatment in New Zealand.

In May 2018 Talagi was discharged without conviction after pleading guilty to assaulting MP Terry Coe outside the Niuean Assembly.

He contested the common roll in the 2020 Niuean general election but failed to win a seat. He was re-elected at the 2023 election. After Talagi lost his common roll seat in the 2026 election, he would be elected as speaker of the Niue Assembly in a 12–8 vote over Togia Sioneholo.
