= Ricky Makani =

Niuean politician

Member of the Niuean Parliament for Tamakautoga
- Incumbent
- Assumed office 30 May 2020
- Preceded by: Andrew Funaki

Ricky Muiaki Makani is a Niuean politician and Member of the Niue Assembly.

In 2019 he was elected to the Tamakautoga village Council. He was first elected to the Niue Assembly in the 2020 Niuean general election. In the Assembly he established and chaired an inquiry into the operations of the Broadcasting Corporation of Niue and Telecom Niue.

He was re-elected in the 2023 election. He was subsequently appointed Member Assisting the Minister to Crossley Tatui, Minister of Finance and Infrastructure.
