= Pokotoa Sipeli =

Niuean politician

Pokotoa Sipeli NDSC
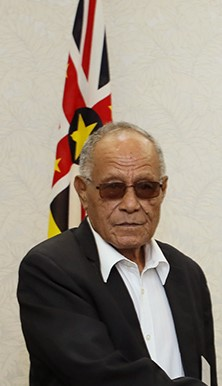
- Sipeli in 2018

Minister for Infrastructure
- In office May 2017 – June 2020
- Prime Minister: Toke Talagi
- Preceded by: Dalton Tagelagi
- Succeeded by: Crossley Tatui

Minister for Education and Social Services
- In office April 2014 – May 2017
- Preceded by: himself
- Succeeded by: Billy Talagi

Minister for Education
- In office May 2011 – April 2014
- Preceded by: Togia Sioneholo
- Succeeded by: himself

Minister for Agriculture, Forestry and Fishery
- In office June 2008 – April 2014
- Succeeded by: Billy Talagi

Member of the Niuean Parliament for Liku
- In office 27 February 1993 – 29 April 2023
- Succeeded by: Logopati Seumanu

Personal details
- Party: Independent

Pokotoa Ikiua Lalotoa Sipeli NDSC is a former Niuean politician and Cabinet Minister who served in the cabinet of Toke Talagi from 2008 to 2020.

== Career ==
Sipeli was first elected to the Niue Assembly in the seat of Liku at the 1993 Niuean general election. Following the 2008 election, he was appointed to premier Toke Talagi's cabinet, as minister of post and telecommunications, minister of agriculture, forestry and fisheries, and minister of administrative services.

He is also chairman of the Niue ICT Development Council (NiDC).

At the 2022 Niue National Awards he was awarded the Niue Distinguished Service Cross.

He retired at the 2023 election.
