= Emani Fakaotimanava-Lui =

Niuean politician

Member of the Niuean Parliament for Common Roll
- Incumbent
- Assumed office 29 April 2023

Emani Haile Fakaotimanava-Lui is a Niuean politician and member of the Niue Assembly. He is the son of former Premier of Niue Frank Lui.

Fakaotimanava-Lui was first elected to the Niue Assembly as a common roll MP in the 2023 Niuean general election. He was subsequently appointed Member Assisting the Minister to Mona Ainuu, the Minister for natural Resources.
