= Tamakautoga =

- Village
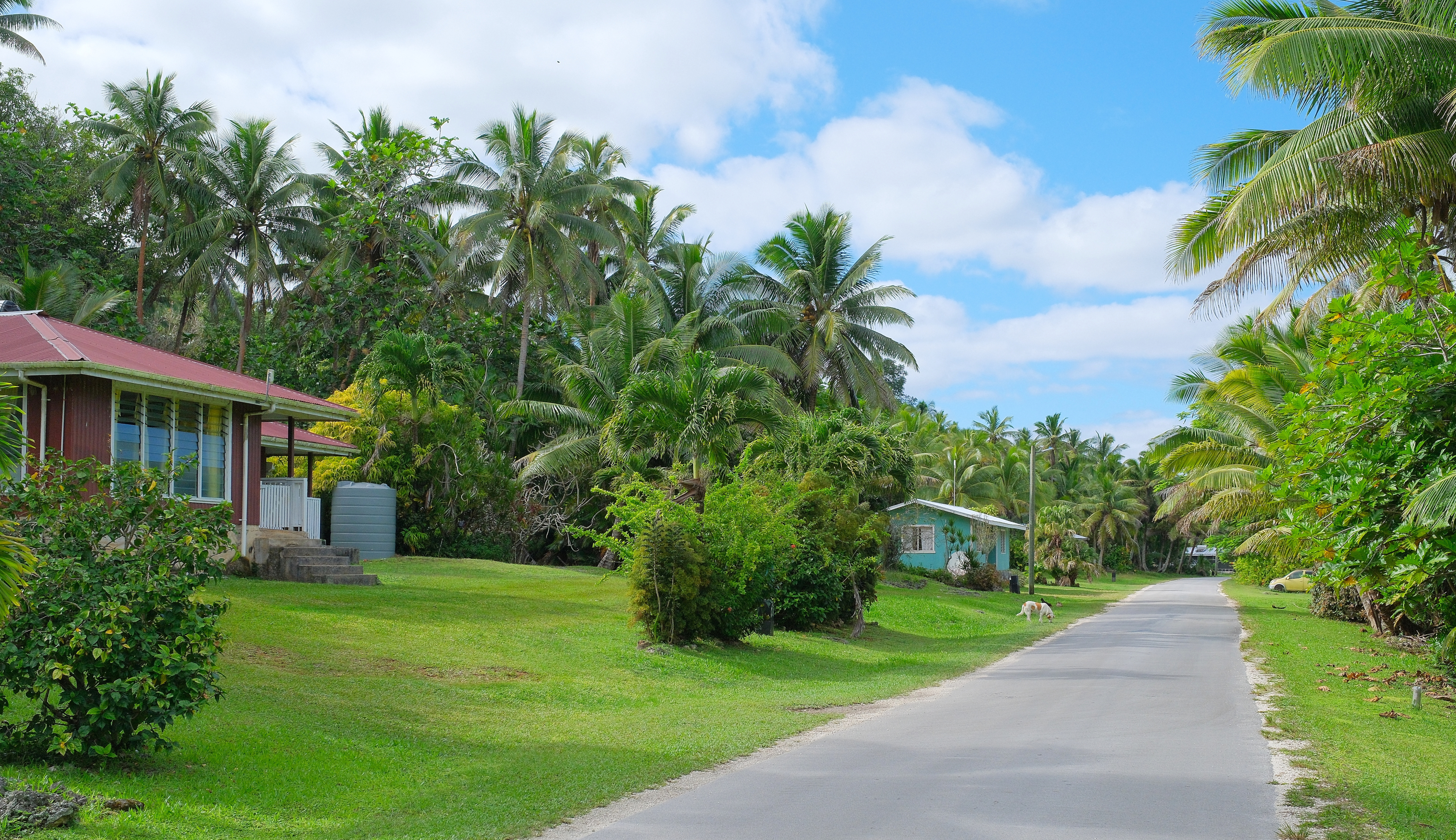

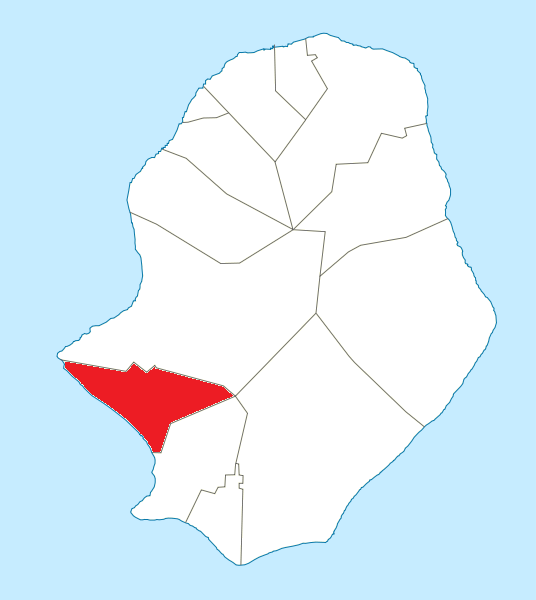
- Tamakautoga council within Niue

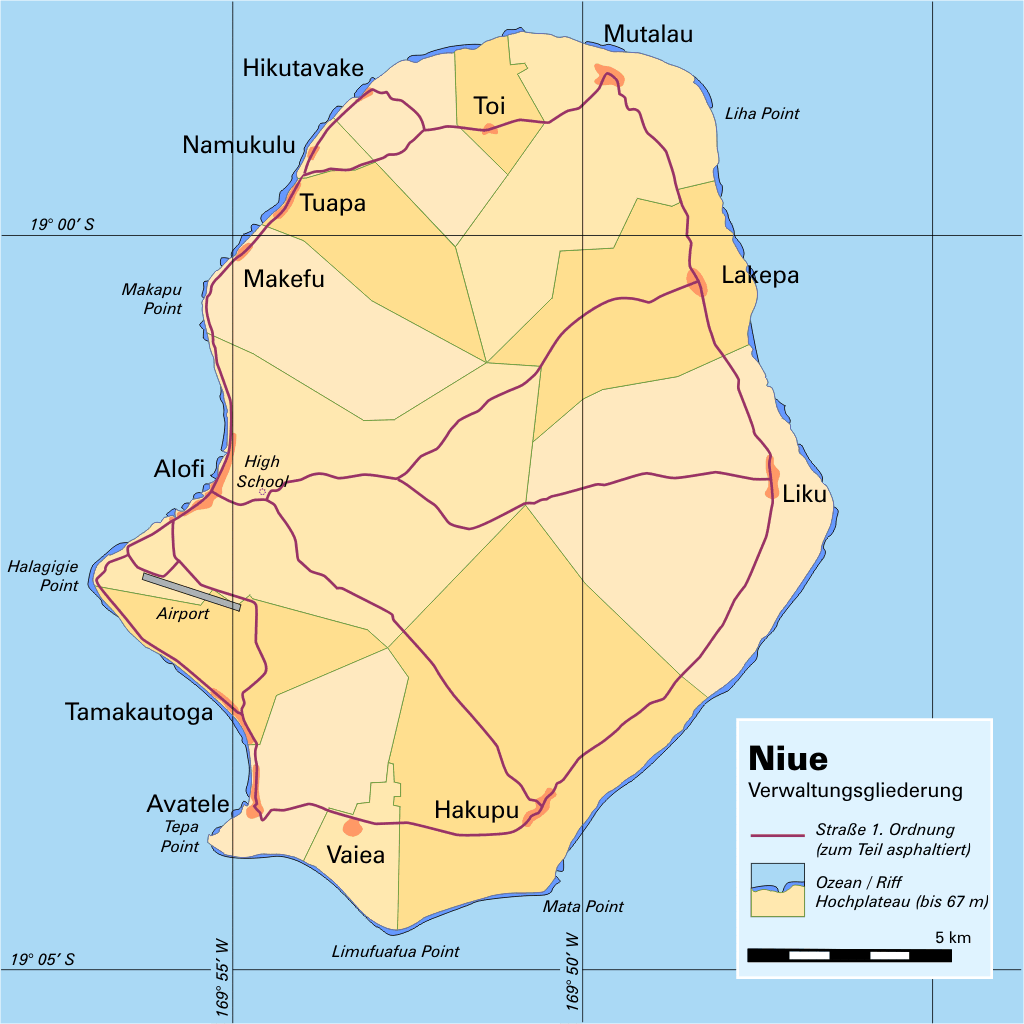
- Administrative map of Niue showing all the villages
- Coordinates: 19°06′14″S 169°55′01″W
- Country: Niue
- Tribal Area: Tafiti

Area
  - Total: 11.93 km^{2} (4.61 sq mi)

Population (2022)
  - Total: 180
  - Density: 15.09/km^{2} (39.1/sq mi)
- Time zone: UTC-11 (UTC-11)
- Area code: +683

Tamakautoga is one of the fourteen villages within the Pacific Ocean island nation of Niue. Tamakautoga is located in the southwestern portion of the island and borders the villages of Avatele, Hakupu, and Niue's capital, Alofi, meeting all three at a quadripoint. The village's population at the 2022 census was 180, down from 198 in 2017. This number has fallen significantly from the 19th century which was reported to be 275 in an 1899 mission census. Tamakautoga is represented by Andrew Funaki in the Niue Assembly.

The climate of Tamakautoga is classified as a tropical rainforest under the Köppen climate classification system. Temperatures in Tamakautoga vary from an average of 22.7 °C (72.9 °F) in July, the coolest month, to an average of 26.5 °C (79.7 °F) in February, the warmest month. Average precipitation in Tamakautoga ranges from a low of 88mm in June, the driest month, to 223mm in January, the wettest month.

The Tamakautoga War Memorial honours Niuean soldiers from Tamakautoga who fought in World War I alongside the New Zealand Expeditionary Force. Tamakautoga holds an annual show day involving performances, meals, and other activities. The 2017 show day was held on 26 August. Tamakautoga is home to the Scenic Matavai Resort Niue, a 55-room resort on the coast of Niue that is part of the Scenic Hotel Group. Tamakautoga is serviced by a number of local roads as well as the Niue International Airport, part of which is located within the boundaries of the village.

Australian writer Louis Becke documented a trip to Niue in his 1897 book Wild Life in Southern Seas in which his nurse took his infant daughter to Tamakautoga to meet members of the nurse's family.

The Area is a popular tourist destination for Scuba Diving
