= Richie Mautama =

Niuean politician

Member of the Niuean Parliament for Hakupu
- Incumbent
- Assumed office 30 May 2020
- Preceded by: Michael Jackson

Richie Mautama is a Niuean politician and Member of the Niue Assembly.

Mautama worked as a building contractor. He was first elected to the Niue Assembly in the 2020 Niuean general election. He was re-elected unopposed in the 2023 election.
