= Opili Talafasi =

Niuean politician

Member of the Niuean Parliament for Hikutavake
- In office 7 April 1990 – 29 April 2023
- Succeeded by: Ian Hipa

Opili Talafasi is a former Niuean politician who served as a Member of the Niue Assembly for 33 years, from 1990 to 2023.

Talafasi was first elected to the Assembly in the 1990 Niuean general election. At the 1996 election he tied with his opponent, Lagaloga Mitikose, but won the seat when his name was drawn from a hat.

He was narrowly re-elected at the 2011 election, but his re-election led to violence and his son's house was burned down in an arson attack. Continuing disputes over the violence saw Talafasi lock the village out of the local church for several months.

He was re-elected at the 2020 election, but lost his seat by a single vote at the 2023 election.
