= Andrew Funaki =

Niuean politician

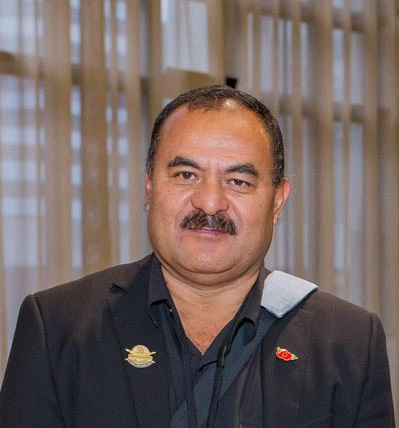
- Andrew Funaki in 2016

Member Assisting the Minister of Infrastructure
- Incumbent
- Assumed office May 2017
- Prime Minister: Toke Talagi
- Minister: Pokotoa Sipeli

Member of the Niue Assembly from Tamakautoga
- In office May 2014 – 20 May 2020
- Succeeded by: Ricky Makani

Personal details
- Party: Independent

Peter Andrew Funaki is a Niuean politician who served in the Niue Assembly, representing the Tamakautoga constituency. Funaki also served in the cabinet of Premier Toke Talagi as a member that assists the Minister of the Ministry of Infrastructure, Pokotoa Sipeli.

He lost his seat in the 2020 Niuean general election.
