= Crossley Tatui =

Niuean politician

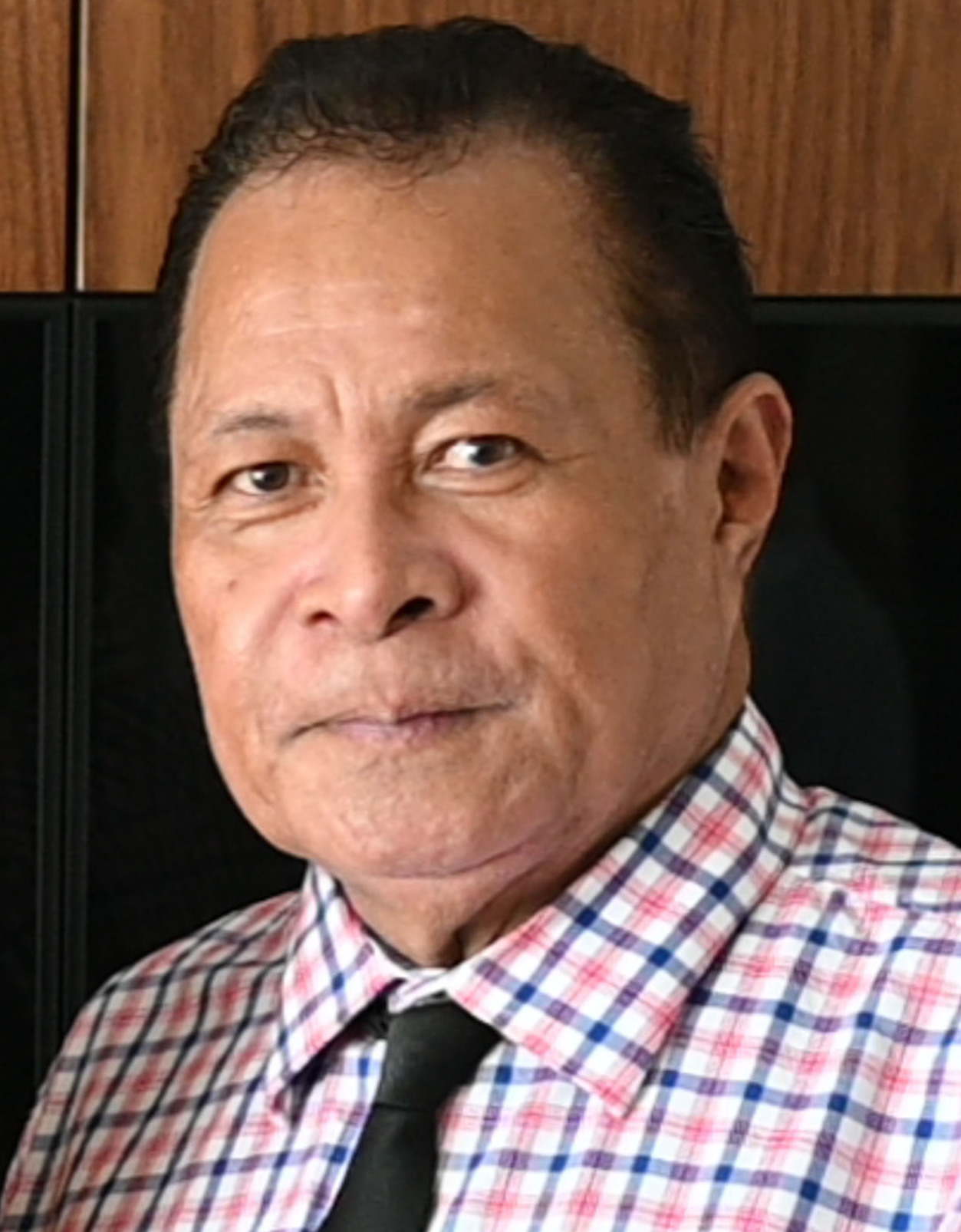
- Tatui in 2022

Minister of Finance and Infrastructure
- Incumbent
- Assumed office 11 June 2020
- Prime Minister: Dalton Tagelagi
- Preceded by: Toke Talagi (finance); Pokotoa Sipeli (infrastructure)

Member of Parliament for Common roll
- Incumbent
- Assumed office 7 May 2011

Personal details
- Party: None

Crossley Tatui is a Niuean politician and member of the Niue Assembly.

Tatui is a graduate of the University of the South Pacific, with a degree in Public Administration and Accounting. He worked as a public servant, initially as a clerk and then in a number of senior roles including Director of Parliamentary Services and Head of External Affairs. He is a lay preacher in the Ekalesia Niue Church.

Tatui was first elected to the Niue Assembly on the common roll in the 2011 Niuean general election. He was re-elected in 2014, 2017, and again in the 2020 election.

On June 11, 2020 Tatui was appointed Minister of Finance and Infrastructure in the Cabinet of Dalton Tagelagi. As Minister of Finance he oversaw Niue's ratification of the PACER Plus regional trade agreement.

He was re-elected at the 2023 election, topping the common roll. He was subsequently reappointed to Tagelagi's Cabinet, holding the same portfolios.
