= O'Love Jacobsen =

Niuean politician and diplomat

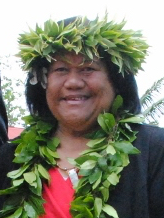
- Jacobsen in 2013

High Commissioner of Niue to New Zealand
- In office March 2011 – 17 March 2017
- Preceded by: Sisilia Talagi
- Succeeded by: Fisa Igilisi Pihigia

Cabinet Minister
- In office June 2008 – March 2011
- Ministry: Health, Public Works, Women’s Affairs, Niue Power Corporation
- Preceded by: ?
- Succeeded by: ?

Member of the Niuean Parliament for no constituency (common roll)
- In office 1989 – March 2011
- In office 6 May 2017 – incumbent

Personal details
- Party: none

Tauveve O’Love Jacobsen is a Niuean politician and diplomat. She served as Niue's High Commissioner to New Zealand from 2011 to 2017. Her predecessor was Sisilia Talagi, Niue's first female diplomat and High Commissioner. She had previously served as a member of the Niue Assembly (national Parliament) and a minister in Toke Talagi's government. She was previously a long-standing leading figure in the informal parliamentary Opposition to Young Vivian's government. She was, from 2008 to 2011, Minister of Health, Minister of Public Works, Minister of Women's Affairs, and Minister in charge of the Niue Power Corporation. She had previously been Minister of Education, Health, Environment, Training and Development. Additionally, Jacobsen is a member of the Commonwealth Parliamentary Association, and Patroness of the Niuean Volleyball Association.

Jacobsen was first elected to the Niue Assembly at a by-election in 1989. She was re-elected in the 1990 election.

Following the 1999 general election, she was a candidate for the post of Premier (head of government), who is selected by the national Assembly. She lost to Sani Lakatani, of the Niue People's Party, by six votes to fourteen.

Following the 2005 general election, Jacobsen was Young Vivian's only opponent contending for the position of Premier. She was defeated by three votes to seventeen. Vivian thanked her for competing against him:

"That the selection was contested, thanks to Ekepule [member of the Assembly] O’love Jacobsen, confirms our determination under the Westminster system of government to adhere and uphold one of the fundamental principles of democracy."

In February 2008, Jacobsen stated that landowners had been bullied into authorising the building of a hotel and golf course on their land, a project supported by the government and funded by Chinese investors. Premier Young Vivian rejected the allegation.

In the lead-up to the 2008 general election, which saw her successfully retain her seat in the Assembly (as a common roll representative), Jacobsen was critical of the fact that several members of the Assembly would be re-elected unopposed. She accused Vivian of discouraging people from taking part in the election as Opposition candidates, and argued that a democracy requires voters being able to choose between several candidates in each constituency.

"If the principle of democracy is going to be upheld, then it is very important that people do need to go to the polls and not have them unopposed and become duly elected."

Vivian rejected Jacobsen's criticism, and argued in return that candidates were chosen within the villages, in traditional ways. With such a practice, he said, "there is no conflict, there’s peace and togetherness."

Following the election, Jacobsen supported Toke Talagi's candidacy to prime ministership, against Vivian, and was appointed to Talagi's small Cabinet.

In March 2011, she resigned from government and from the Assembly to be appointed Niue's High Commissioner to New Zealand. She served in that capacity until early 2017, then stood in the Niuean general election in May, announcing her intention to lead the government as Prime Minister. She was elected to the Assembly, topping the poll in the common roll election, but lost the vote for the Premiership to Talagi by 15 votes to 5.

Jacobsen was re-elected at the 2020 election, and once again stood unsuccessfully for Premier, being defeated by 13 votes to 7 by Dalton Tagelagi. She was re-elected again at the 2023 election.
