= Talaititama Talaiti =

Niuean politician

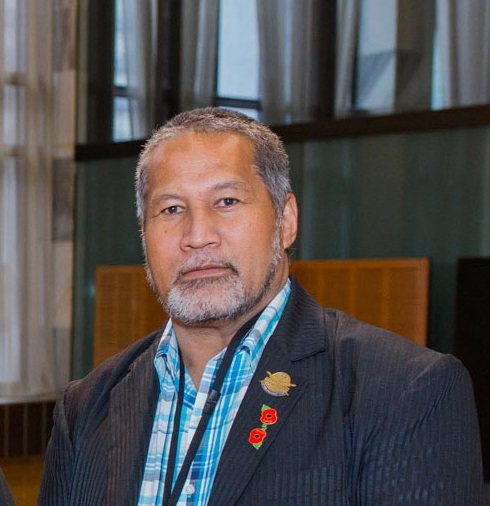
- Talaititama Talaiti 2016

Member of the Niuean Parliament for Vaiea
- Incumbent
- Assumed office 1992

Talaititama Talaiti is a Niuean politician and member of the Niue Assembly.

Talaiti is a long-serving member of the Assembly, and has represented the village of Vaiea since being elected unopposed in 1992. Since 2014 he has served as an Assistant Minister, first as Assistant Minister of Infrastructure from 2014 - 2017, then as Assistant Minister of Education from 2017 - 2020.

Talaiti represented Niue in shooting at the 2006 Commonwealth Games in Melbourne.

He was re-elected unopposed at the 2023 election.
