= Mona Ainuu =

Niuean politician

Mona Ainu'u
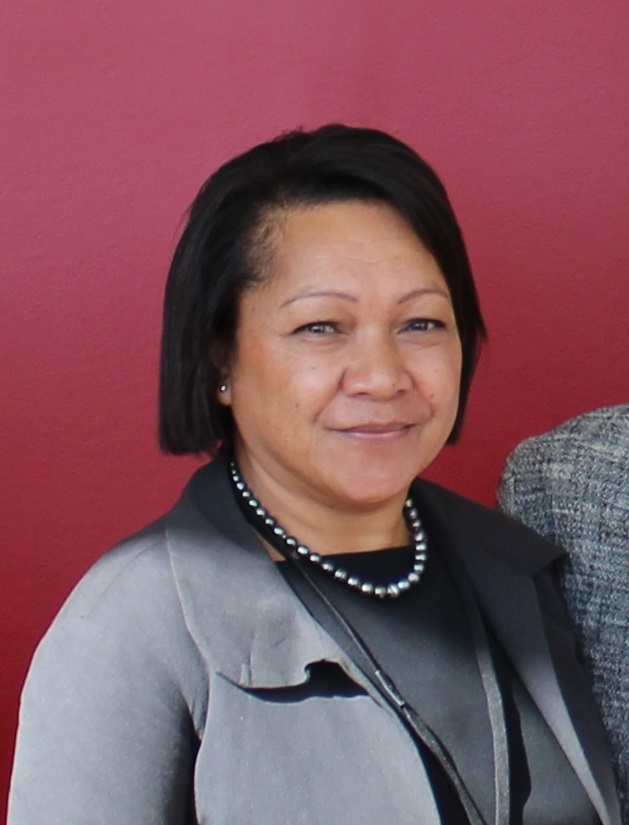
- Mona Ainu’u in 2017

Minister of Natural Resources
- Incumbent
- Assumed office 11 June 2020
- Prime Minister: Dalton Tagelagi
- Preceded by: Dalton Tagelagi

Member Assisting the Minister for Natural Resources
- In office May 2017 – 11 June 2020
- Prime Minister: Toke Talagi
- Minister: Dalton Tagelagi
- Preceded by: Halene Magatogia

Member of Parliament for Tuapa
- Incumbent
- Assumed office 6 May 2017
- Preceded by: Fisa Igilisi Pihigia

Personal details
- Party: None
- Occupation: Journalist; Politician

Mona Ainuu is a Niuean politician and Cabinet Minister.

Prior to entering politics, Ainuu was a journalist with the Broadcasting Corporation of Niue and a Public Relations and Media Officer with the Niuean government. She was also the president of the Niue Island Volleyball Association and a founding member of the Pacific Alliance of Development Journalists.

Ainu'u was first elected to the Niue Assembly in the 2017 Niuean general election, representing the Tuapa constituency. She was subsequently appointed Member Assisting the Minister for Natural Resources. On 11 June Ainu'u was appointed Minister of Natural Resources in the Cabinet of Dalton Tagelagi.

She was re-elected unopposed at the 2023 election, and reappointed to Tagelagi's cabinet holding the same portfolios.
