= Terry Coe =

Niuean politician

Member of the Niuean Parliament for Common Roll
- In office 27 February 1993 – 29 April 2023

Terry Donald Coe is a Niuean politician and former cabinet minister.

He was first elected to the Niue Assembly as a common roll member in the 1993 Niuean general election, and immediately made a Minister in the Cabinet of Premier Frank Lui.

Coe served as a minister in the Cabinet of Premier Frank Lui between 1993 and 1999, serving as Minister of Finance, Telecommunications, and Public Works, as well as other portfolios. He lost his place in Cabinet after Lui was defeated in the 1999 election and has since become a key member of the country's opposition.

After the 1999 election, Coe supported O'Love Jacobsen for premier.

In 2002, he was unsuccessfully prosecuted for criminal libel by the government. The charges were dismissed after police failed to produce any evidence.

In 2011, he criticised his fellow MPs for voting themselves a sizeable increase in salary. He said the pay rises for politicians were a waste of public money that “would be better spent on development”.

He was re-elected in the 2020 election. During the COVID-19 pandemic he opposed moves by the Niuean government to relax covid protections.

He lost his seat in the 2023 election.
