= Avatele =

Avatele (Oneonepata Matavaihala)
- Village
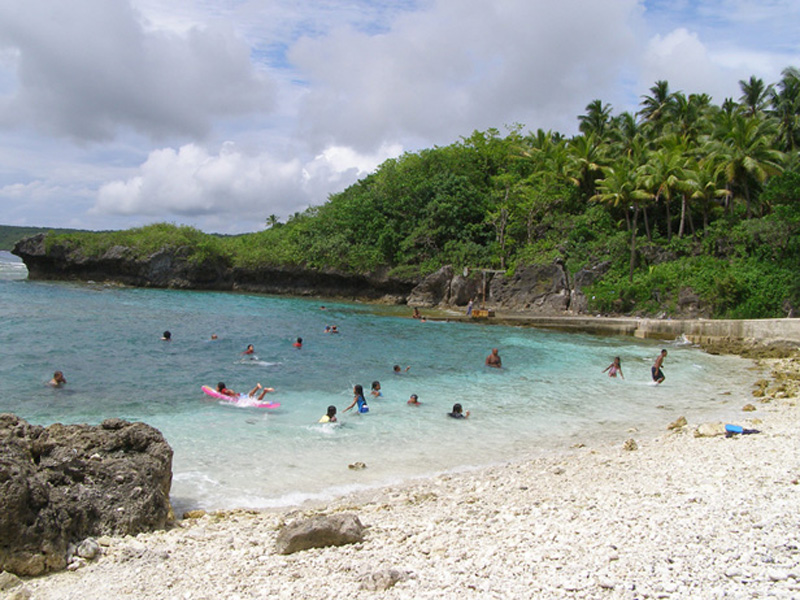
- Avatele Beach

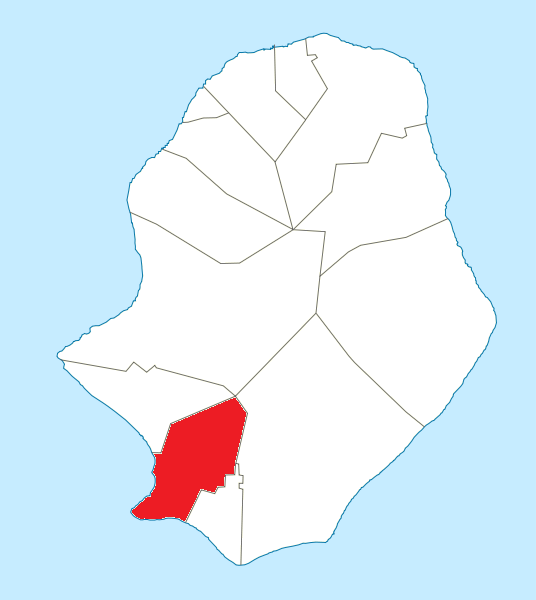
- Avatele council within Niue

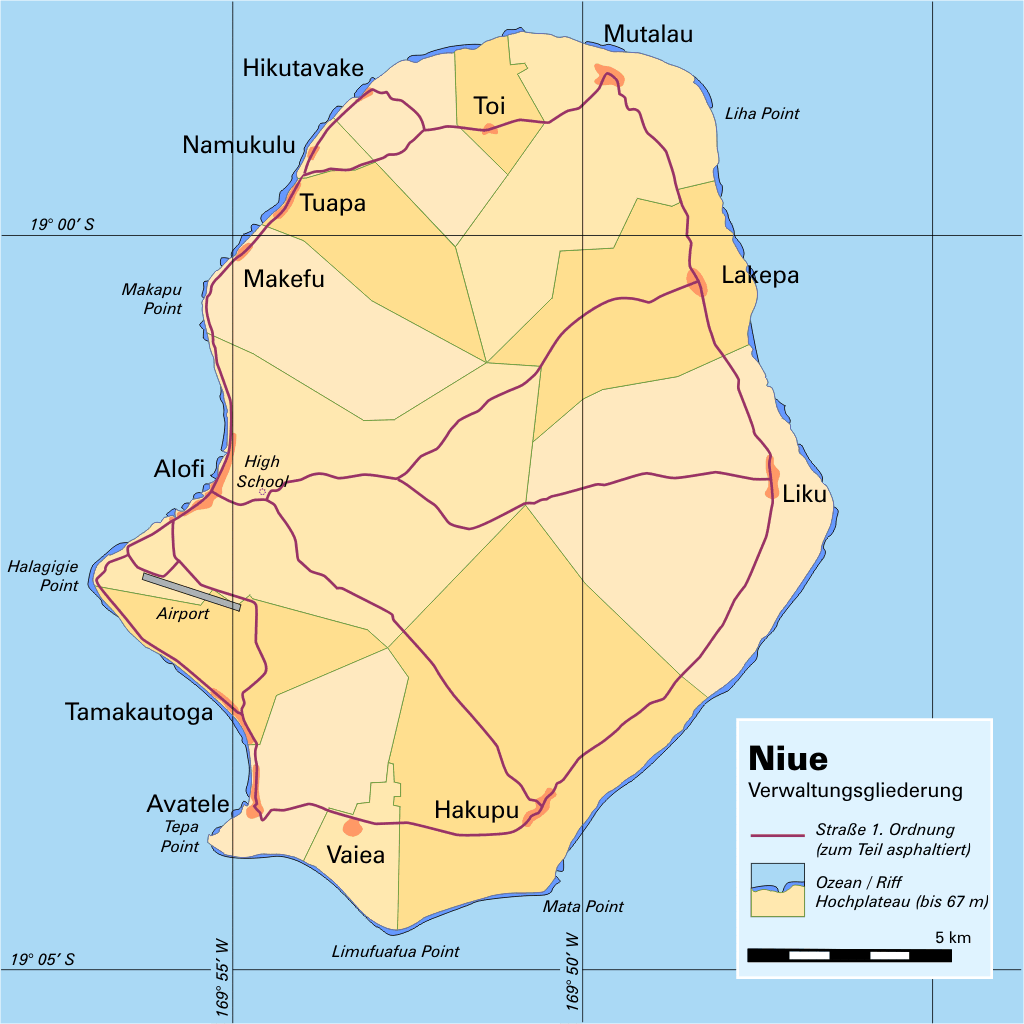
- Administrative map of Niue showing all the villages
- Coordinates: 19.05°S 169.9°W
- Country: Niue
- Tribal Area: Tafiti

Government
  - Assemblyman/MP: Hon. Billy Graham Talagi (1999 - )
  - Village Council Chairperson: Kanetoni Ikimotu (2009 - )

Area
  - Total: 13.99 km^{2} (5.40 sq mi)

Population (2022)
  - Total: 128
  - Density: 9.15/km^{2} (23.7/sq mi)
- Time zone: UTC-11 (UTC-11)
- Area code: +683

Avatele, formerly known as Oneonepata Matavaihala, is one of the fourteen villages of Niue. It is located on the southwest coast, with a population of 128 residents as of 2022.

== Geography ==
Avatele Beach, the village's main sea track, stretches along the coast of Avatele Bay and is the largest and most well-known beach on the island. Although the sand is mostly of the coarse kind it is an important swimming and picnic site for both tourists and residents. Prior to the construction of the Sir Robert Rex Wharf and Hannan International Airport in Alofi, Avatele Beach was the principal landing place for many visitors to the island.

== History ==
Avatele, along with the villages Mutalau, Tuapa, Alofi and Hakupu, were the first major village settlements of Niue following settlement by Polynesian voyagers from Samoa, Tonga and Pukapuka before the year 1300.

The beach was also the site of Captain James Cook's third and final landing attempt on the island before naming Niue "Savage Island" in 1774, since then it has been the landing and official welcoming site of many prominent figures from across the Pacific and the world such as missionaries Rev. George Lawes, his brother Dr. Frank Lawes and former Governor-Generals of Niue and New Zealand such as Sir Paul Reeves.

The village was first Christianized in early 1854 when a resident, Muatoga, asked Paulo, the Samoan missionary residing in Mutalau, to bring the gospel to his village in the far-south and Paulo agreed. The village received its first pastor that same year, a Rev. Samuela from Samoa who was sent by Paulo to care for the young church at Avatele, a village of over 1,000 residents at the time. Since 1854, 14 Pastors have been entrusted with the care of the Church in the village both from around Niue and overseas, including the current Rev Petesa Sionetuato. The village has also birthed its own share of missionaries over the years such as the respected ancestor or tupuna Rev. Sionepaea Kinimotu who played a major role in the Christianization of Tuvalu.

In 1888 the village was one of the main harbours of Niue and was the location of the mission training school. In 1889 the village church was destroyed by a tropical cyclone.

== People ==
Avatele has also produced its fair share of prominent Niueans past and present, including Niue's late inaugural Premier Sir Robert Rex, his late brother and long-serving Senior Advisor to Government Leslie Rex OBE, the late Rev. Ikiua Lupo, first President of the Ekalesia Kerisiano Niue, the late Takelesi Lagaluga, first Niuean Head of a Government Department, and his son Hon. Himalea Takelesi, Niue's first High Commissioner to New Zealand and former Member of Parliament. Renowned All Black Frank Bunce is also descended from the village and is the nephew of both Sir Robert Rex and Rev. Ikiua Lupo.

Current prominent and Avateleans of interest include:

- Hon. Billy Talagi - Avatele Representative MP (1999–2020)
- Rev. Matagi Jessop Vilitama - Ekalesia Avatele Pastor (1996 - 2007)
- Rev. Petesa Pokopokotau Sionetuato - Ekalesia Avatele Pastor (2008–present)
