= Dalton Tagelagi =

Prime Minister of Niue since 2020

The Honourable Dalton Tagelagi
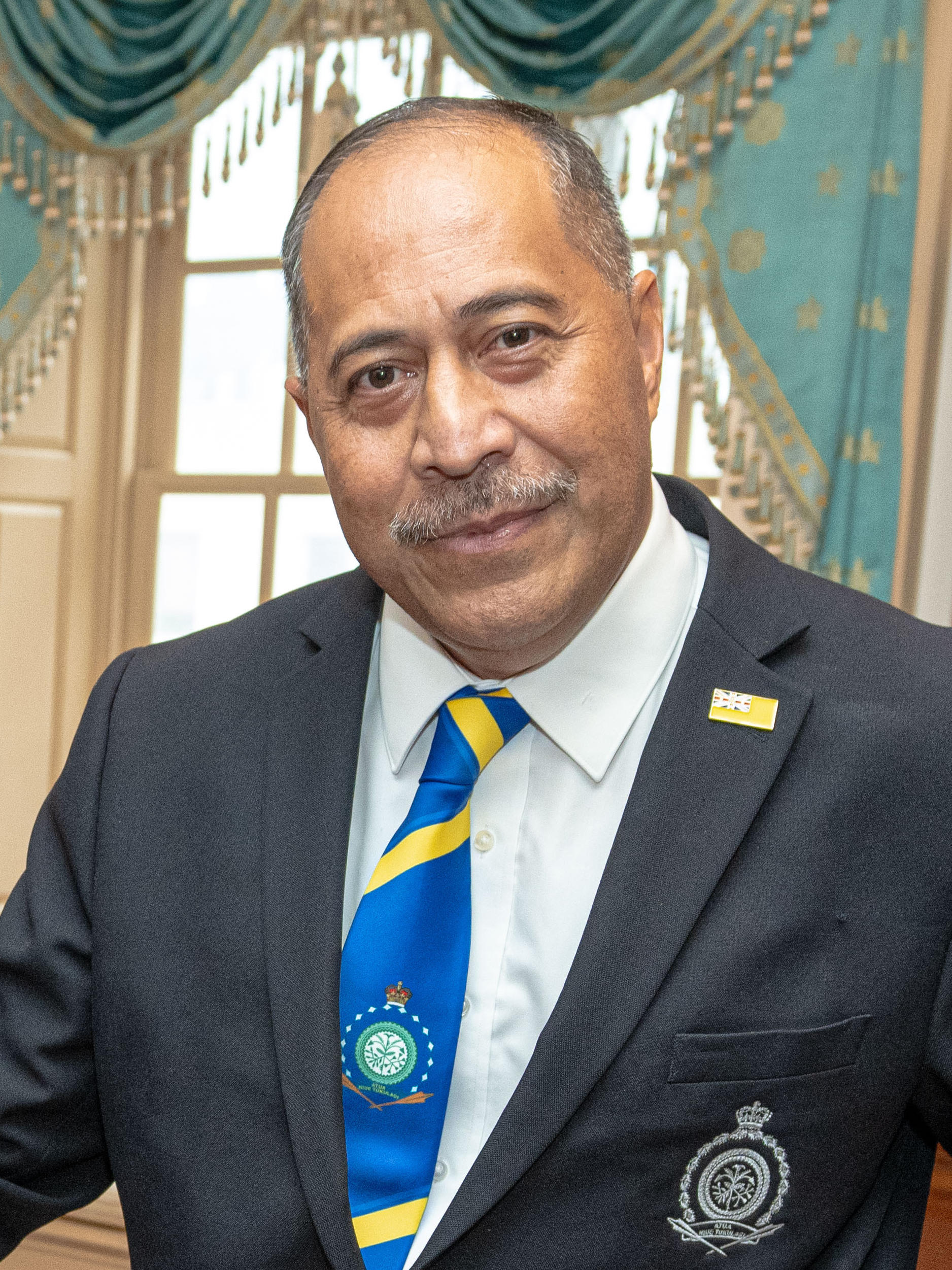
- Tagelagi in 2023

Prime Minister of Niue
- Incumbent
- Assumed office 11 June 2020
- Monarchs: Elizabeth II; Charles III
- Governor-General: Patsy Reddy; Cindy Kiro
- Preceded by: Toke Talagi

Minister for Natural Resources
- In office May 2017 – June 2020
- Premier: Toke Talagi
- Preceded by: Billy Talagi

Member of the Niue Assembly from Alofi South
- Incumbent
- Assumed office May 2008

Personal details
- Born: Dalton Emani Makamau Tagelagi; 5 June 1968 (age 58) Alofi, Niue
- Party: Independent
- Relatives: Sonya Talagi (half-sister)
- Occupation: Politician; bowler

Dalton Emani Makamau Tagelagi (born 5 June 1968) is a Niuean politician who has served as the sixth and current Prime Minister of Niue since June 2020. He was elected premier by the Niue Legislative Assembly on 11 June 2020, defeating O'Love Jacobsen by 13 votes to 7.

Tagelagi is the son of Sam Pata Emani Tagelagi, who served as Speaker of the Niue Legislative Assembly from 1972 to 1996.

== Early life ==
Dalton Tagelagi was born on 5 June 1968 in Alofi, Niue. His father, Sam Pata Emani Tagelagi, served as the Speaker of the Niue Legislative Assembly from 1972 until 1996. Growing up, he attended the Halamahaga Primary School, followed by Niue High School. He is the half-brother of Sonya Talagi.

== Political career ==
Tagelagi was first elected to the Niue Assembly at the 2008 Niuean general election. Following the 2014 Niuean general election he was appointed Minister of Infrastructure. He was re-elected at the 2017 Niuean general election, and subsequently served as Minister for the Environment, Natural Resources, Agriculture, Forestry and Fisheries. As Environment Minister he represented Niue at the 2019 United Nations Climate Change Conference, calling for rich nations to show greater ambition.

He was re-elected in the 2020 Niuean general election and subsequently elected premier. After being elected he announced that his first priority would be investigating government finances. As Premier his government ratified the PACER Plus regional trade agreement. During the COVID-19 pandemic he negotiated a one-way travel-bubble allowing Niueans to travel to New Zealand, and oversaw a vaccination program which saw Niue gain full herd immunity to the virus. In November 2021 he began a one-year term as Chancellor of the University of the South Pacific. His tenure concluded in June 2022, and he was succeeded by Tuimalealiʻifano Vaʻaletoʻa Sualauvi II.

He was re-elected unopposed to the Assembly at the 2023 election. He was subsequently re-elected as Premier, defeating O'Love Jacobsen 16 votes to 4. He appointed his cabinet on 12 May 2023, the first gender-balanced cabinet in Niuean history.

In the 2026 election, he narrowly retained his seat in Alofi South by one vote, defeating his challenger Alana Rex. He was also re-elected for a third term as prime minister after defeating Emani Fakaotimanava-Lui in a close vote of 11–9.

== Bowls career ==
Tagelagi has competed in bowls for Niue, at the 2014 Commonwealth Games in Glasgow and the 2018 Commonwealth Games on the Gold Coast. In 2022, he competed in the men's pairs and the men's fours at the 2022 Commonwealth Games in Birmingham.

Political offices
Preceded by Toke Talagi	Premier of Niue; 2020–present	Incumbent
Academic offices
Preceded by David Kabua	Chancellor of the University of the South Pacific; 2021–2022	Succeeded by Tuimalealiʻifano Vaʻaletoʻa Sualauvi II
