= 13th Niue Assembly =

The 13th Niue Assembly was a term of the Niue Assembly. Its composition was determined by the 2008 election, held on June 7, 2008.

The Speaker of the 13th Assembly was Atapana Siakimotu.

== Members ==
The members of the 13th Legislative Assembly were:

Name	Party	Electorate	Term
Terry Coe	Independent	Common roll	Sixth
Peter Eu Funaki	Independent	Tamakautoga	
Maihetoe Hekau	Independent	Common roll	First
O’Love Jacobsen	Independent	Common roll	Eighth
Jack Willie Lipitoa	Independent	Namukulu	Eighth
Kupa Magatogia	Independent	Lakepa	
Bill Motufoou	Independent	Mutalau	Fourth
Esther Pavihi	Independent	Common roll	First
Fisa Pihigia	Independent	Tuapa	
Tofua Puletama	Independent	Makefu	Fourth
Togia Sioneholo	Independent	Common roll	First
Pokotoa Sipeli	Independent	Liku	
Dalton Tagelagi	Independent	Alofi South	First
Opili Talafasi	Independent	Hikutavake	
Billy Graham Talagi	Independent	Avatele	Fourth
Toke Talagi	Independent	Common roll	Fourth
Talaititama Talaiti	Independent	Vaiea	Sixth
Dion Taufitu	Independent	Toi	
Va'aiga Tukuitonga	Independent	Alofi North	Fourth
Young Vivian	Independent	Hakupu	
