= 14th Niue Assembly =

The 14th Niue Assembly was a term of the Niue Assembly. Its composition was determined by the 2011 general election, held on 7 May 2011.

The Speaker of the 14th Assembly was Togiavalu Pihigia.

== Members ==
The members of the 14th Legislative Assembly were:

Name	Electorate
Terry Coe	Common Roll
Andrew Funaki	Tamakautoga
Stan Kalauni	Common Roll
Jack Willie Lipitoa	Namukulu
Halene Magatogia	Lakepa
Bill Vakaafi Motufoou	Mutalau
Fisa Igilisi Pihigia	Tuapa
Togia Sioneholo	Common Roll
Dalton Tagelagi	Alofi South
Opili Talafasi	Hikutavake
Toke Talagi	Common Roll
Billy Talagi	Avatele
Talaititama Talaiti	Vaiea
Crossley Tatui	Common Roll
Dion Taufitu	Toi
Salilo Tongia	Makefu
Va'aiga Tukuitonga	Alofi North
Joan Viliamu	Common Roll
Young Vivian	Hakupu
