= Dion Taufitu =

Niuean politician

Minister of Agriculture, Fisheries, Forestry
- In office 26 March 1999 – 1 May 2002
- Prime Minister: Sani Lakatani
- Succeeded by: Bill Vakaafi Motufoou

Minister of Public Works
- In office 26 March 1999 – 1 May 2002
- Prime Minister: Sani Lakatani
- Succeeded by: Bill Vakaafi Motufoou

Member of the Niuean Parliament for Toi
- Incumbent
- Assumed office 7 June 2008
- Preceded by: Lilivika Muimatagi

Member of the Niuean Parliament for Toi
- In office 7 April 1990 – 30 April 2005
- Succeeded by: Lilivika Muimatagi

Dion Paki Taufitu is a Niuean politician and Cabinet Minister.

Taufitu formerly served as clerk of the Niue Assembly. He was first elected to the Assembly at the 1990 Niuean general election. He was re-elected at the 1996 election. He was re-elected at the 1999 election and appointed Minister of Administrative Services, Public Works, Agriculture, Fisheries, Forestry, Employment, and Broadcasting in the government of Sani Lakatani. He was re-elected at the 2002 election, but lost his seat at the 2005 election on a hat-draw.

He was re-elected to the Assembly at the 2008 Niuean general election. He was re-elected in the 2011 election, but was in New Zealand for medical treatment when it was time to be sworn in. Speaker of the Assembly Ahohiva Levi travelled to Auckland and privately administered the oath of office there, but the validity of the process was challenged by common roll MP Togia Sioneholo. In March 2012 the High Court of Niue ruled that the oath was invalid, precipitating the 2012 Toi by-election. Taufitu won the by-election and was subsequently sworn in in April 2012.

At the 2014 election Taufitu tied with Mokaelalini Vaha, but was elected after his name was drawn from a hat. Vaha launched an unsuccessful election petition.

He was re-elected at the 2017 and 2020 elections. In July 2022 he served as an acting Minister while Premier Dalton Tagelagi was overseas. When the Assembly sat in 2023, he was elected interim Speaker for its first sitting, as Speaker Hima Douglas was overseas. At the 2023 election he was re-elected unopposed.
