= Queen Elizabeth II Silver Jubilee Medal =

- Obverse of the medal
- Type: Medal
- Awarded for: Community contribution
- Presented by: The monarch of Australia, Canada, New Zealand, and United Kingdom
- Eligibility: Commonwealth citizens
- Clasps: None
- Status: No longer awarded
- Established: 6 February 1977
- First award: 1977
- Final award: 1977

Highlights
- Total: 68,377
- Ribbon bar

Precedence
- Next (higher): Dependent on state
- Next (lower): Dependent on state
- Related: Coronation Medal, Golden Jubilee Medal, Diamond Jubilee Medal, Platinum Jubilee Medal

The Queen Elizabeth II Silver Jubilee Medal (French: Médaille du jubilé d'argent de la reine Elizabeth II) is a commemorative medal created in 1977 to mark the 25th anniversary of Queen Elizabeth II's accession in 1952. The medal is physically identical in all realms where it was awarded, save for Canada, where it contained unique elements. As an internationally distributed award, the Queen Elizabeth II Silver Jubilee Medal holds a different place in each country's order of precedence for honours.

== Basis of award and numbers awarded ==
The Queen Elizabeth II Silver Jubilee Medal was created by a Royal Warrant from the Queen.

Until 1977, the practice for coronation and jubilee medals was for the United Kingdom authorities to decide on a total number of medals to be produced and allocate how many were to be distributed by each Dominion and possession across the British Empire, and later, to each Commonwealth country. From 1977, the award of the medals was at the discretion of each national government. Thus, 30,000 were distributed in Britain, 1,507 in New Zealand, 6,870 in Australia, and 30,000 in Canada.

== Design ==
The Queen Elizabeth II Silver Jubilee Medal in the UK was designed by David Wynne. It is in the form of a 32 millimetres (1.3 in) diameter silver disc with, on the obverse, the words ELIZABETH II DEI GRA. REGINA FID. DEF. (Latin abbreviation for "Elizabeth II, by the Grace of God, Queen, Defender of the Faith") surrounding an effigy of Queen Elizabeth II, symbolising her role as fount of honour. On the reverse is a crown atop a wreath that contains the words THE 25th YEAR OF THE REIGN OF QUEEN ELIZABETH II 6 February 1977 in six lines.

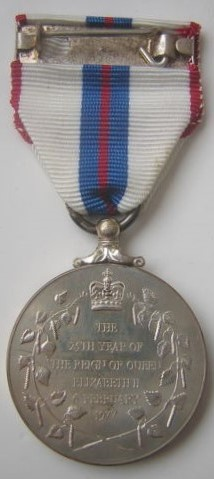
British version

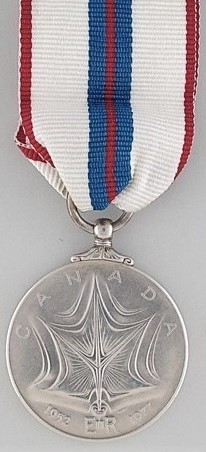
Canadian version

The Canadian version has a number of differences, with the medal slightly thicker and the crown on the Queen's effigy more upright. The reverse has a distinct design, and bears a stylised maple leaf with CANADA above and the Royal Cypher below, flanked with the dates 1952 and 1977.

Both versions of the medal are worn on the left chest, suspended from a brooch bar on a 31.8 millimetres (1.25 in) wide white ribbon with cardinal red bands along the edges, each 1mm wide, and a 7mm wide garter blue stripe down the centre, bisected by another 1mm wide line of cardinal red; the colours carried on the tradition for jubilee medals. Women may wear the medal near the left shoulder with the ribbon tied in a bow. Like the Police Long Service and Good Conduct Medal and Queen's Police Medal, ribbon bars are also available. The medal, which came with a certificate, was awarded unnamed.

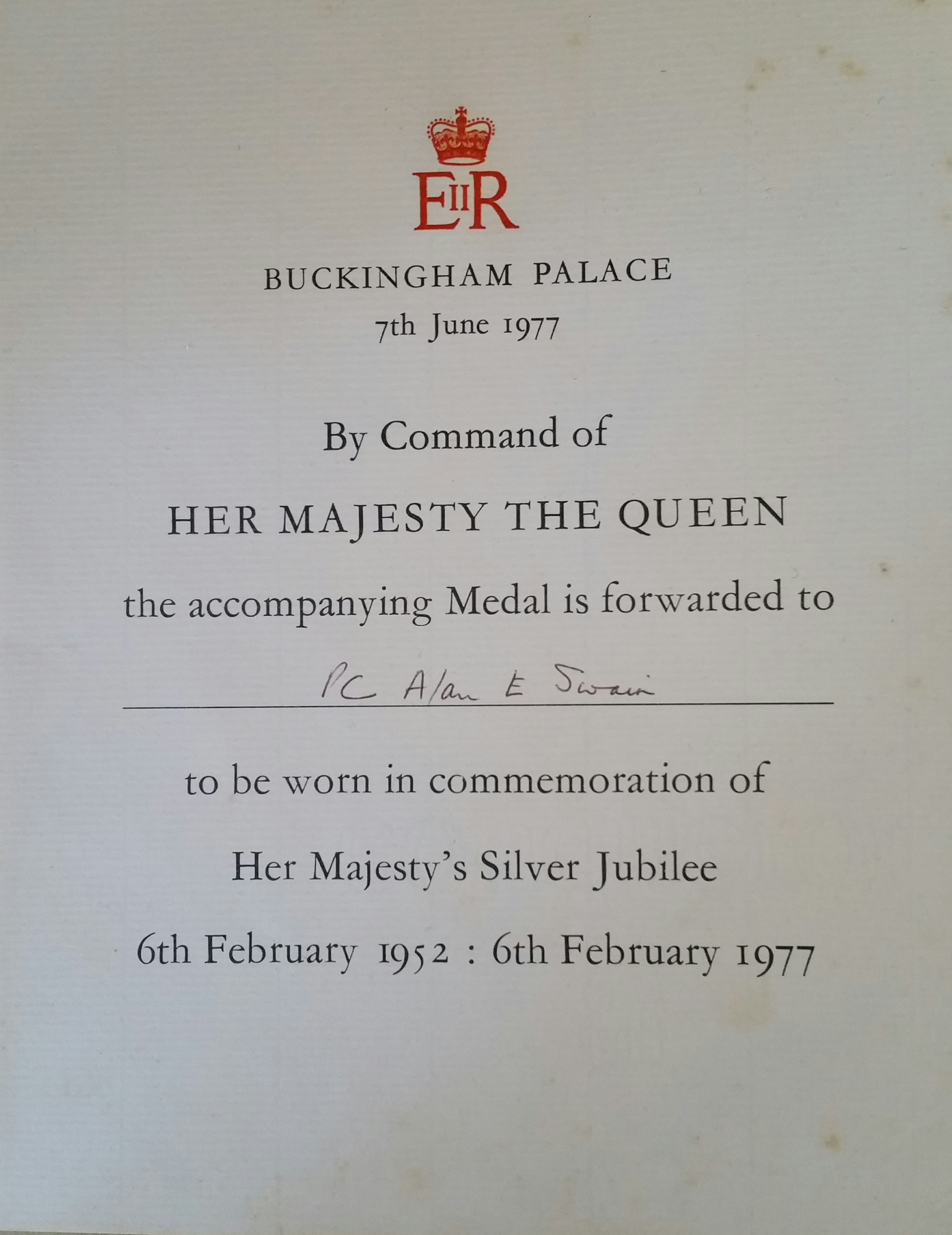
Queen's Silver Jubilee Medal certificate, awarded to PC Alan E Swain.

== Eligibility and allocation ==
The Canadian medal was intended to award individuals who had been deemed to have made a significant contribution to their fellow citizens, their community or to Canada. So that all regions of the country would be recognised equally, the federal, provincial, and civic governments all forwarded names to Rideau Hall, as did private organisations in the fields of the arts, sports, philanthropy, and charity. The full membership of the Order of Canada and Order of Military Merit, as well as all recipients of Canadian Bravery Decorations received the Queen Elizabeth II Silver Jubilee Medal automatically, while for members of the Canadian Forces, merit with length of service and prestige of current appointment was considered.

The 30,000 medals awarded within the United Kingdom included 9,000 to armed forces personnel, with others given to members of the Royal Household and to people engaged in a wide range of activities, including industry, trade, local services, voluntary work, the arts, entertainment and sport.

== Precedence ==
Some orders of precedence are as follows:

Country	Preceding	Following
(Australia) Australia; Order of precedence	Queen Elizabeth II Coronation Medal	Queen Elizabeth II Golden Jubilee Medal
(Canada) Canada; Order of precedence	Canadian Centennial Medal	125th Anniversary of the Confederation of Canada Medal
(New Zealand) New Zealand; Order of precedence	Queen Elizabeth II Coronation Medal	Queen Elizabeth II Golden Jubilee Medal
(United Kingdom) United Kingdom; Order of precedence	Queen Elizabeth II Coronation Medal	Queen Elizabeth II Golden Jubilee Medal

== Notable recipients ==
=== Australia ===
Around 6,780 Australians received the medal including:

- Roden Cutler
- David Yencken
- Keith Payne

=== Canada ===
The following list includes notable Canadians who received the Queen Elizabeth II Silver Jubilee Medal, and is not an exhaustive list of recipients.

- Hilda Hellaby
- Gerry Snyder
- Marvin Weintraub

=== Cook Islands ===
The following list includes notable Cook Islanders who received the Queen Elizabeth II Silver Jubilee Medal, and is not an exhaustive list of recipients.

- Inatio Akaruru
- Albert Henry
- Geoffrey Henry
- Margaret Makea Karika Ariki
- Ngatupuna Matepi
- Tiakana Numanga
- Pa Tepaeru Terito Ariki
- Raui Pokoati
- Ngereteina Puna
- Pupuke Robati
- Ada Rongomatane Ariki
- Marguerite Story
- Tangaroa Tangaroa
- Vainerere Tangatapoto
- Tararo Jane Ariki
- Joe Williams

=== New Zealand ===
The following list includes notable New Zealanders who received the Queen Elizabeth II Silver Jubilee Medal, and is not an exhaustive list of recipients.

==== A ====
- Lance Adams-Schneider
- Colin Aikman
- Neil Anderson
- Basil Arthur
- Brian Ashby
- Rex Austin

==== B ====
- Ron Bailey
- Harry Barker
- Jim Barnes
- Mary Batchelor
- David Beattie
- Bruce Beetham
- Bob Bell
- Manuhuia Bennett
- Bill Birch
- Philip Blakeley
- Paddy Blanchfield
- June Blundell
- Jim Bolger
- Ted Bollard
- Richard Bolt
- Ray Boord
- Betty Bourke
- Vivienne Boyd
- Whitford Brown
- Malcolm Burns

==== C ====
- Maurice Casey
- Lester Castle
- George Chapman
- Val Chapman
- Muir Chilwell
- Gordon Christie
- Fraser Colman
- Ken Comber
- Mick Connelly
- Robin Cooke
- Warren Cooper
- Assid Corban
- Frank Corner
- Merv Corner
- Anthony Cottrell
- Ben Couch

==== D ====
- Harry Dansey
- Ronald Davison
- Graham Davy
- Miriam Dell
- Richard Dell
- Colleen Dewe
- Gaven Donne
- Roger Douglas
- Pat Downey
- Gavin Downie
- Stewart Duff
- Eddie Durie

==== E ====
- John Elliott
- Keith Elliott
- Brian Elwood
- Jonathan Elworthy
- Dean Eyre

==== F ====
- Bob Fenton
- Dick Fickling
- Martyn Finlay
- Ray Forster
- Michael Fowler
- Laurie Francis
- Bill Fraser
- Dorothy Fraser
- Warren Freer
- Tony Friedlander

==== G ====
- George Gair
- Audrey Gale
- Bernie Galvin
- Les Gandar
- Frank Gill
- Peter Gordon
- Eric Gowing
- Laurence Greig

==== H ====
- Eric Halstead
- Sid Harling
- Richard Harrison
- Ken Haslett
- Ronald Hassett
- Trevor Hatherton
- Hamish Hay
- James Henare
- Trevor Henry
- Jean Herbison
- Russell Hervey
- Allan Highet
- Jack Hinton
- Patu Hohepa
- Eric Holland
- Grace Hollander
- Frank Holmes
- Keith Holyoake
- Norma Holyoake
- Judith Hornabrook
- Clive Hulme
- Jack Hunn
- Jonathan Hunt
- Te Reo Hura

==== I ====
- Trevor Inch
- Eddie Isbey

==== J ====
- Roy Jack
- Ossie Jackson
- Ewan Jamieson
- Clyde Jeffery
- John Jeffries
- Alan Johns
- Allen Johnston
- Dail Jones
- Norman Jones

==== K ====
- John Kavanagh
- John Keaney
- David Kear
- Reginald Keeling
- Hamish Keith
- Mervyn Kemp
- John Kennedy-Good
- Herb King
- Arthur Kinsella
- John Kirk
- Ruth Kirk
- John Kneebone
- Jim Knox

==== L ====
- George Laking
- Bill Lambert
- Harry Lapwood
- Tom Larkin
- Graham Latimer
- Ed Latter
- Harry Laurent
- Ray La Varis
- Ian Lawrence
- Kevan Lawrence
- Leonard Leary
- Graeme Lee
- Graham Lintott
- John Lithgow
- Charles Philip Littlejohn
- Don Llewellyn
- Tom Logan
- Noel Lough
- Jack Luxton

==== M ====
- Brian MacDonell
- John Mackey
- Peter Mahon
- Colin Maiden
- Aussie Malcolm
- Peter Mann
- Leo Manning
- Jack Marshall
- Russell Marshall
- Gordon Mason
- John Mathison
- Laurel McAlister
- John McAlpine
- Thaddeus McCarthy
- Terry McCombs
- Allan McCready
- Alan McCulloch
- David McGee
- Alister McIntosh
- Duncan MacIntyre
- Don McKay
- Colin McLachlan
- Jim McLay
- Roy McLennan
- Colin McLeod (engineer)
- Duncan McMullin
- Dot McNab
- Patrick Millen
- F. Russell Miller
- Holmes Miller
- Mike Minogue
- Rex Morpeth
- Ian Morrison
- Thea Muldoon
- Bill Mumm
- Lee Murdoch

==== N ====
- Gray Nelson
- Doris Nicholson
- Edward Norman
- Merv Norrish
- Alfred North

==== O ====
- Gerald O'Brien
- Patrick O'Dea
- Frank O'Flynn
- Joe Ongley
- John Ormond
- Elizabeth Orr
- Phillip O'Shea

==== P ====
- Denis Pain
- Whatumoana Paki
- Bruce Palmer
- Les Pearce
- Clifford Perry
- Brian Poananga
- Lindsay Poole
- Guy Powles
- Richard Prebble
- Alfred Preece
- Mervyn Probine
- Allan Pyatt

==== Q ====
- Derek Quigley
- Peter Quilliam

==== R ====
- Athol Rafter
- Matiu Rata
- Paul Reeves
- Bill Renwick
- Aroha Reriti-Crofts
- Paraone Reweti
- Winston Reynolds
- Clifford Richmond
- John Robertson
- Dove-Myer Robinson
- John Robson
- John Rodgers
- Frank Rogers
- Mary Ronnie
- Bill Rowling
- Glen Rowling
- Ron Russell
- Frank Ryan

==== S ====
- Laurie Salas
- Leo Schultz
- Ian Shearer
- Pat Sheehan
- Jack Shepherd
- Max Short
- Larry Siegert
- Cliff Skeggs
- Tom Skinner
- George Smith
- Edward Somers
- Jack Somerville
- Graham Speight
- Ron Spriggs
- Bert Stanley
- Marcel Stanley
- Brian Stevenson
- Alan Stewart
- Roy Stoneham
- Jack Sullivan
- Denis Sutherland
- Peter Sutton
- Mira Szászy

==== T ====
- Rob Talbot
- Brian Talboys
- Peter Tapsell
- Nicholas Tarling
- Danny Taylor
- Somerford Teagle
- Te Atairangikaahu
- Hugh Templeton
- Fred Thomas
- Ken Thomas
- David Thomson
- Robert Thomson
- Leonard Thornton
- Whetu Tirikatene-Sullivan
- Bob Tizard
- David Tompkins
- Peter Trapski
- Jim Traue
- Leonard Trent
- Ron Trotter
- Doug Truman
- Graham Turbott
- Alexander Turner
- Frederick Turnovsky

==== U ====
- Charles Upham

==== V ====
- Adrienne von Tunzelmann

==== W ====
- Bert Walker
- Ranginui Walker
- Gerry Wall
- Augusta Wallace
- John Wallace
- Richard Walls
- Bob Walton
- Arthur Ward
- Marilyn Waring
- David Watt
- Hugh Watt
- Jim Weir
- Merv Wellington
- Koro Wētere
- John White
- Bob White
- Lloyd White
- Richard White
- Richard Wild
- Peter Wilkinson
- David Williams
- Rob Williams
- Robin Williams
- Ormond Wilson
- Owen Woodhouse

==== Y ====
- Gavin Yates
- Bill Young
- Trevor Young
- Venn Young

=== Niue ===
The following list includes notable Niueans who received the Queen Elizabeth II Silver Jubilee Medal, and is not an exhaustive list of recipients.

- Enetama Lipitoa
- Frank Lui
- Lapati Paka
- Patricia Rex
- Robert Rex
- Sam Pata Emani Tagelagi
- Pope Talagi
- Young Vivian

== See also ==
- Queen Elizabeth II Coronation Medal
- Queen Elizabeth II Golden Jubilee Medal
- Queen Elizabeth II Diamond Jubilee Medal
- Queen Elizabeth II Platinum Jubilee Medal
