= 2026 in Niue =

- Decades: 2000s; 2010s; 2020s
- See also: Other events of 2026; Timeline of Niuean history

The following lists events that happened during 2026 in Niue.

== Incumbents ==
- Monarch: Charles III
- Premier – Dalton Tagelagi
- Speaker of the Assembly – Hima Douglas

== Events ==
=== January ===
- 7 January – Germany formally recognizes and establishes diplomatic relations with Niue, coordinating ties from the embassy in Wellington, New Zealand.

=== February ===
- 20 February – Fiji-based retail chain, CJS Supermarket, expands into Niue through the purchase of the country's largest supermarket, Swanson.

=== May ===
- 2 May – 2026 Niuean general election

=== August ===
- 28 August – A historic meeting of the leaders of the four constituent members of the Realm of New Zealand to discuss constitutional arrangements is held in Auckland. This meeting is attended by Prime Minister Tagelagi, New Zealand Prime Minister Christopher Luxon, Ulu-o-Tokelau Alapati Tavite, and Cook Islands Prime Minister Mark Brown.

== Sports ==
- A Niuean team competes at the 2026 Commonwealth Games, 23 July – 2 August.

== Deaths ==
- 17 January – Sani Lakatani, politician, premier of Niue (1999–2002), Minister of Finance (1993–1994) (born 1936).
