= 2025 in Niue =

- Decades: 2000s; 2010s; 2020s
- See also: Other events of 2025; Timeline of Niuean history

The following lists events that happened during 2025 in Niue.

== Incumbents ==
- Monarch: Charles III
- Premier – Dalton Tagelagi
- Speaker of the Assembly – Hima Douglas

== Events ==
=== February ===
- 4 February – Niue health authorities report a total of 71 COVID-19 cases in Niue; with 18 cases reported in the last 36 hours. 32 of these cases remained active.
- 7 February – Niue health authorities declare a COVID-19 outbreak, with a total of 99 cases. This is the second outbreak in the island state since November 2022.

== Deaths ==
- 20 January – Richard Hipa, public servant and politician, Secretary of Government (2008–2017), Member of the Niue Assembly (2020–2023) (born 1957).
