= 1975 Niuean general election =

- 26 April 1975

All 20 seats in the Assembly 11 seats needed for a majority
Premier before election
Robert Rex
Independent
Elected Premier
Robert Rex
Independent

General elections were held in Niue on 26 April 1975.

== Background ==
The new constitution approved in a 1974 referendum provided for a 21-member Assembly consisting of a Speaker and 20 elected members. Fourteen of the members were elected from single-member constituencies based on the 14 villages, and six from an island-wide constituency.

== Campaign ==
A total of 15 candidates contested the island-wide seats. Eleven of the fourteen village constituencies had only one candidate, who was returned unopposed.

== Results ==
Two women were elected, becoming the first female members of the Assembly. One was Patricia Rex, wife of Leader of Government Business Robert Rex. Two of Rex's other relatives running in the election (his son Robert and uncle Leslie) were unsuccessful.

Constituency	Elected members
Alofi North	
Alofi South	Robert Rex
Avatele	
Hakupu	Young Vivian
Hikutavake	
Island-wide	Lapati Paka
Island-wide	Patricia Rex
Island-wide	Tahafa Pope Talagi
Island-wide	Papani Tanu
Island-wide	Togakilo
Island-wide	Togia Viviani
Lakepa	
Liku	
Makefu	
Mutalau	Don Vilitama
Namukulu	
Tamakautoga	
Toi	
Tuapa	
Vaiea	
Source: Pacific Islands Monthly

== Aftermath ==
When the newly elected Assembly met five days after the election, Sam Pata Emani Tagelagi was reappointed as Speaker.

Robert Rex was elected Premier and reappointed the three incumbent ministers to the cabinet, Enetama Lipitoa, Frank Lui and Young Vivian.

Portfolio	Cabinet member
Premier, Customs, Emigration, Finance, Immigration, Information, Police, Prisons, Transport	Robert Rex
Agriculture, Economic Development, Education	Young Vivian
Health, Justice, Lands, Local Government Affairs, Radio	Enetama Lipitoa
Electricity, Fisheries, Forests, Tourism, Works	Frank Lui
Source: Pacific Islands Monthly
