= 2020 in Niue =

- Decades: 2000s; 2010s; 2020s
- See also: Other events of 2020; Timeline of Niuean history

The following lists events that happened during 2020 in Niue.

== Incumbents ==
- Monarch: Elizabeth II
- Premier: Toke Talagi (until 11 June) Dalton Tagelagi (from 11 June)
- Speakers of the Assembly: Togiavalu Pihigia (until 10 June) Hima Douglas (from 11 June)

== Events ==
Ongoing – COVID-19 pandemic in Oceania

- 3 April – Even though no cases were reported in the territory, the government banned visitors from countries highly affected by the COVID-19 pandemic.
- 30 May – Premier Toke Talagi, in office for twelve years, lost his seat in general elections were held in the country.

== Deaths ==
- 15 July – Toke Talagi, former Premier (born 1951)
