= 2024 in Niue =

- Decades: 2000s; 2010s; 2020s
- See also: Other events of 2024; Timeline of Niuean history

The following lists events that happened during 2024 in Niue.

== Incumbents ==
- Monarch: Charles III
- Premier – Dalton Tagelagi
- Speaker of the Assembly – Hima Douglas

== Events ==
- 5 June – Niuean Premier Dalton Tagelagi and New Zealand Prime Minister Christopher Luxon sign an agreement to enhance the free association relationship between the two countries. New Zealand also agrees to invest NZ$20.5 million into a new renewable energy project on Niue.
- 31 August:
  - 2024 Niuean constitutional referendum
  - 2024 Niuean village council elections
