= Aokuso Pavihi =

Niuean politician

Minister of Finance
- In office October 1997 – March 1999
- Prime Minister: Frank Lui
- Preceded by: Terry Coe
- Succeeded by: Sani Lakatani

Member of the Niue Assembly
- In office 1993–1999

Personal details
- Died: 10 January 2019
- Children: Esther Pavihi

Poumare Sasalu Aokuso Pavihi (died 10 January 2019) was a Niuean politician. He served as minister of finance from 1997 to 1999.

== Biography ==
After working in the upper echelons of the public administration, he later became an administrative director at the Ministry of Justice, then chairman of the board of directors of the Niue Development Bank. He also founded a small family motel in the village of Avatele, Esther's Motel.

As the representative for this village in the Niue Assembly, he was appointed Minister of National Planning and Economic Development in Frank Lui's government during the 1993-1996 term. The government pursued a policy of privatization and public spending cuts, notably reducing the number of civil servants and assisting some laid-off officials in retraining for agriculture. It counted on tourism development for the country's economy but faced a lack of connectivity with the outside world; Air Nauru provided the country's only air link, with weekly flights between Niue and Auckland.

He was re-elected as deputy for Avatele in the 1996 Niuean general election, he was made Minister of Justice, Lands, Economy and Private Sector Development in the government of Frank Lui. In October 1997, following disagreements between Prime Minister Lui and Finance Minister Terry Coe, Frank Lui appointed Aokuso Pavihi as Finance Minister and Minister of Tourism. Niue's economy remained in difficulty, as public money invested in tourism development in previous years had yielded no results, to the point that the government sought to sell the almost empty state-owned hotel.

In the 1999 Niuean general election, Aokuso Pavihi was defeated in his constituency of Avatele by candidate Billy Talagi, while Frank Lui lost his seat as MP for Alofi-North to Va'aiga Tukuitonga. His daughter Esther Pavihi became an MP in turn from 2008 to 2011.

Aokuso Pavihi became the coordinator of the Niue Island Organic Farmers Association (NIOFA), an association promoting organic agriculture focused particularly on export.

Through his Samoan grandmother Lilly Tuautu Peters, in 2013 he was invested with the title of matai (Samoan customary chief) "Poumare".

He died in hospital in Alofi on 10 January 2019, from a "ruptured abdominal aortic aneurysm due to hypertension resulting from diabetes", and was buried in his village of Avatele. His daughter Esther Pavihi sued the hospital, arguing that her father could have been saved if he had been evacuated to a hospital in New Zealand, but she unsuccessful in the High Court.
