= 2021 in Niue =

- Decades: 2000s; 2010s; 2020s
- See also: Other events of 2021; Timeline of Niuean history

The following lists events that happened during 2021 in Niue.

== Incumbents ==
- Monarch: Elizabeth II
- Premier – Dalton Tagelagi
- Speaker of the Assembly – Hima Douglas (from 11 June)

== Events ==
Ongoing – COVID-19 pandemic in Oceania

== Deaths ==
- 9 July – Frank Lui, politician, premier of Niue (1993–1993) (born 1935)
