= Lilivika Muimatagi =

Niuean politician

Member of the Niuean Parliament for Toi
- In office 30 April 2005 – 7 June 2008
- Preceded by: Dion Taufitu
- Succeeded by: Dion Taufitu

Lilivika Liumaihetau Muimatagi is a Niuean lawyer and politician.

As a candidate in the very small village of Toi in the 2002 general election, Muimatagi won the votes of eight of the eighteen voters, having lost to Dion Taufitu. In the 2005 elections, she won exactly the same number of votes as the incumbent MP, and was declared elected MP for Toi by a hat-draw. She did not run again in the 2008 elections, and won only three of the eighteen votes in the 2011 elections.
