= 2022 in Niue =

- Decades: 2000s; 2010s; 2020s
- See also: Other events of 2022; Timeline of Niuean history

The following lists events that happened during 2022 in Niue.

== Incumbents ==
- Monarch: Elizabeth II (until 8 September); Charles III onwards
- Premier – Dalton Tagelagi
- Speaker of the Assembly – Hima Douglas

== Events ==
Ongoing – COVID-19 pandemic in Oceania

- 16 January – 2022 Hunga Tonga–Hunga Ha'apai eruption and tsunami: Coastal areas are evacuated following the eruption of Hunga Tonga–Hunga Haʻapai, no tsunami is reported.
- 10 March – Niue reports its first COVID-19 case since the pandemic began in a person who traveled from New Zealand and who had tested negative prior to departing.
- 6 July – The New Zealand Defence Force says that, upon request by the government of Niue, it is sending a team of civilian doctors, nurses, and defense personnel to help the territory deal with an outbreak of COVID-19.
- 8 September – Elizabeth II dies at Balmoral Castle, Scotland, her son and heir Charles III becomes King of Niue.
- 19 September – Premier Dalton Tagelagi attends the funeral of Elizabeth II.

== Sports ==
- 28 July – 8 August: Niue at the 2022 Commonwealth Games
