= 2023 in Niue =

- Decades: 2000s; 2010s; 2020s
- See also: Other events of 2023; Timeline of Niuean history

The following lists events that happened during 2023 in Niue.

== Incumbents ==
- Monarch: Charles III
- Premier – Dalton Tagelagi
- Speaker of the Assembly – Hima Douglas

== Events ==
- 29 April – 2023 Niuean general election
- 19 October – 2023 Niue National Awards

== Sports ==
- 19 November – 2 December: Niue at the 2023 Pacific Games
