= 1990 Niuean general election =

- 7 April 1990

All 20 seats in the Assembly 11 seats needed for a majority
Premier before election
Robert Rex
Independent
Elected Premier
Robert Rex
Independent

General elections were held in Niue on 7 April 1990, seven months after Cyclone Ofa caused considerable damage to the island. While primarily contested by independents, the election was contested by Young Vivian's Niue People's Action Party (NPAP), which was opposed to premier Robert Rex. On election night the NPAP believed it had a majority, but a leadership dispute between Vivian and newly-elected MP Sani Lakatani saw a group of MP's led by the latter switch sides.

Following the election, Robert Rex was re-elected for a sixth term as Premier of Niue by a vote of 12 to 8. Sam Tagelagi was re-elected Speaker by the same margin.
