= 2012 Toi by-election =

A by-election was held in the village of Toi, in Niue, on 31 March 2012.

A general election was held in Niue on 7 May 2011. The island of Niue is one of the smallest self-governing nations in the world; it has an approximate population of 1,400, and a national Assembly of twenty members. Six of those are elected on an island-wide roll, while the other fourteen are elected from single-member village constituencies. There are no political parties. The electoral system in the constituencies is the first past the post system. In the 2011 election, eighteen voters cast a ballot for the constituency seat of Toi; incumbent candidate Dion Taufitu was reelected with an absolute majority of votes (11 votes; 61.1%). When the newly elected Assembly convened for members to take the oath of office, however, Taufitu was ill in Auckland. Assembly Speaker Ahohiva Levi travelled to Auckland and administered the oath to him there. Former Secretary for Justice and Common Roll Member of Parliament Togia Sioneholo challenged the validity of this procedure, arguing that an oath of office was only valid, under the Westminster system, if taken in public. The High Court, in early March 2012, ruled that the oath had not been administered properly, and found that Taufitu was therefore no longer legally the MP for Toi, precipitating a by-election.

== Candidates and result ==
There were two candidates: the incumbent Dion Taufitu, and Mokaelalini Vaha. Taufitu was reelected with eleven votes to six; there was one invalid vote. He was then sworn in successfully.

Candidate	Party	Votes	%	+/–
Dion Taufitu	Independent	11	64.71	+3.60
Mokaelalini Vaha	Independent	6	35.29	New
Total		17	100.00	–
Majority		5	29.42	–9.40
Dion Taufitu hold				

== 2011 result ==
Candidate	Party	Votes	%
Dion Taufitu	Independent	11	61.11
Hamouli Kaulima	Independent	4	22.22
Lilivaka Muimatagi	Independent	3	16.67
Total		18	100.00
Majority		7	38.89
Dion Taufitu hold			
