= 1984 Niuean general election =

- 1984

All 20 seats in the Assembly 11 seats needed for a majority
Premier before election
Robert Rex
Independent
Elected Premier
Robert Rex
Independent

General elections were held in 1984. Following the elections, Robert Rex remained Premier and appointed Enetama Lipitoa, Frank Lui and Robert Rex Jr. to the cabinet.
