= 2008 Niuean general election =

- 7 June 2008

All 20 seats in the Assembly 11 seats needed for a majority

General elections were held in Niue on 7 June 2008. They were initially expected to be held in April, but were delayed until June 2008. Niue has a 20-member legislative assembly, called the Niue Assembly, whose members are elected by approximately 600 registered voters. The assembly consists of 20 total members, 6 elected on a common roll and 14 representatives of the villages

== Election management ==
The election was managed and controlled by the Chief Electoral Officer, Togia Sioneholo, who is also the Secretary of the Niue Department of Justice, Lands and Survey. However, since Sioneholo was also a candidate, he had to go on leave as required by the Niue Public Service Regulations. Hubert Kalauni took over the control and management of the election as Sioneholo's replacement (Sioneholo won a seat in the Niue Legislative Assembly).

== Timetable ==
- 22 May 2008: Nominations close at noon.
- 30 May 2008: Withdrawal of nominations close at noon.
- 28 May 2008: Registration and objection of names in the Electoral Roll close.
- 7 June 2008: Polling day

== Results ==
Only three of the six sitting common assembly members retained their seats in the general election. O'Love Jacobsen, who has been a member of the Niue Legislative Assembly for twenty years and was re-elected, remarked that the election was a call for change by Niuean voters. Jacobsen believed that the election would lead to a new government and a new Premier of Niue. She openly supported Toke Talagi's candidacy for the incoming prime ministership against current Premier Young Vivian.

One of the three incumbent common assembly MPs who failed to be re-elected was Hima Douglas, former High Commissioner to New Zealand, who was unseated by Niue's Secretary of Justice Togia Sioneholo. Two female candidates, Mahetoi Hekau and Esther Pavihi, were elected as new members thereby unseating two incumbent MPs, Michael Jackson and Krypton Okesene.

In the capital and main village of Alofi, challenger Dalton Tagelagi easily defeated the incumbent member in the Alofi South constituency.

=== Common roll ===
Final results according to Acting Chief Electoral Officer Mr Hubert Kalauni:

Candidate	Votes	%	Notes
Toke Talagi	493	10.71	Elected
Terry Coe	464	10.08	Elected
Togia Sioneholo	355	7.71	Elected
Esther Pavihi	337	7.32	Elected
Maihetoe Hekau	332	7.21	Elected
O'Love Jacobsen	327	7.10	Elected
Hima Douglas	317	6.88	
Joan Viliamu	303	6.58	
Krypton Okesene	258	5.60	
Sifaole Ioane	250	5.43	
Taumafai Fuhiniu	194	4.21	
Stan Atuvaha Kalauni	185	4.02	
Michael Jackson	184	4.00	
Robert Matua Rex	145	3.15	
Harkai Pihigia	140	3.04	
Eneletama Kaiuha	116	2.52	
Taso Tukuniu	114	2.48	
Togiavalu Pihigia	91	1.98	
Total	4,605	100.00	

=== Constituencies ===
Constituency	Candidate	Votes	%	Notes
Alofi North	Va'aiga Tukuitonga	—	—	Elected unopposed
Alofi South	Dalton Tagelagi	60	34.29	Elected
Alofi South	Fakahoa Organ Viliko	48	27.43	
Alofi South	Charlie Fuku Tongahai	41	23.43	
Alofi South	Puleikitama Tasmania	26	14.86	
Avatele	Billy Talagi	—	—	Elected unopposed
Hakupu	Young Vivian	—	—	Elected unopposed
Hikutavake	Opili Talafasi	15	51.72	Elected
Hikutavake	Pamela Anne Tokiakona	14	48.28	
Lakepa	Halene Kupa Magatogia	—	—	Elected unopposed
Liku	Pokotoa Sipeli	—	—	Elected unopposed
Makefu	Tofua Puletama	24	60.00	Elected
Makefu	Vivaliatama Elesoni Talagi	16	40.00	
Mutalau	Bill Vakaafi Motufoou	—	—	Elected unopposed
Namukulu	Jack Willie Lipitoa	—	—	Elected unopposed
Tamakautoga	Andrew Funaki	52	63.41	Elected
Tamakautoga	Muiakituki Makani	30	36.59	
Toi	Dion Taufitu	10	62.50	Elected
Toi	Mokaelalini Vaha	6	37.50	
Tuapa	Fisa Igilisi Pihigia	—	—	Elected unopposed
Vaiea	Talaititama Talaiti	—	—	Elected unopposed

== Aftermath ==
Despite the fact that new members, including Togia Sioneholo, Mahetoi Hekau and Esther Pavihi, were elected to the legislative assembly, no single candidate for the premiership had a clear majority.

The highest polling candidate in the election, incumbent MP Toke Talagi, stated he was considering to challenge Young Vivian for the premier's post; caretaker Deputy Premier Fisa Pihigia stated he would also stand if Talagi decided to stand, as Pihigia considered himself to be better suited to fend off a challenge from Talagi than Vivian.

Eventually, Talagi and Vivian stood for premier. Talagi was elected on Thursday, June 26, 2008, with fourteen votes to Vivian's five, with one abstaining.

Atapana Siakimotu was returned unopposed as Speaker of the House.

On Thursday 20 June 2008, Hon Premier Toke Talagi announced through TV Niue the other three members of his Cabinet of Ministers, Hon Pokotoa Sipeli, Hon Togia Sioneholo and Hon O'love Tauveve Jacobsen.
