= 1972 Niuean general election =

South Pacific Island election

- 18 March 1972

All 20 seats in the Assembly 11 seats needed for a majority

General elections were held in Niue on 18 March 1972. Only five of the eleven constituencies were contested, with the candidates in the other six constituencies elected unopposed.

== Aftermath ==
Following the elections, Robert Rex was re-elected as Leader of Government Business and formed an Executive Council of four members.

Member	Portfolios
Robert Rex	Leader of Government Business, Finance and Government Administration
Enetama Lipitoa	Health, Justice, Radio and Post Office
Frank Lui	Works and Police
Young Vivian	Agriculture, Economic Development and Marketing, Education

Shortly after the elections concluded, a Select Committee for Constitutional Development was established to look at issues including land laws and the future relationship with New Zealand. This led to a referendum on self-governance in 1974.
