= 1960 Niuean general election =

- 23 March 1960

All 20 seats in the Assembly 11 seats needed for a majority

General elections were held in Niue for the first time on 23 March 1960. A total of 39 candidates contested the 14 seats in the Assembly, with 2,118 voters registered. Voter turnout was 97%.

== Background ==
As part of the 1915 Cook Islands Act, Niue was granted a 12-member Island Council with a representative appointed from each village by the Governor-General of New Zealand from candidates nominated by the Minister for the Cook Islands. The members were de facto chosen by the fono of each village, which was attended by the heads of each family.

The Cook Islands Act 1957 resulted in the legislature being renamed the Niue Island Assembly, as well as increasing its membership to 14 elected members and the Resident Commissioner as president, and providing for election by secret ballot for all Niueans aged 18 or over.

== Results ==
Constitutency	Elected member
Alofi North	Arumaki Strickland
Alofi South	Robert Rex
Avatele	Tauehetagaloa
Hakupu	Ahetoa Aue
Hikutavate	Limatau Poepata
Lakepa	Kaliatama
Liku	Farani Nogotau
Makefu	Togia Pahiva
Mutalau	Pulefolau Talipule
Namukulu	Feleti
Tamakautoga	Peika Taiea
Toi	Liumaihetau
Tuapa	Tamatoa Tom
Vaiea	Talaiti
Source: Pacific Islands Monthly, New Zealand Gazette
