= 19th Niue Assembly =

The 19th Niue Assembly is the current term of the Niue Assembly. The term was determined by the results of the 2026 Niuean general election. After elected members were sworn in on 13 May 2026, the 19th Niue Assembly proceeded to elect a speaker and a prime minister. Billy Talagi, who had lost his common roll seat, became the new speaker of the Assembly after defeating Togia Sioneholo in a 12–8 vote. Dalton Tagelagi was also re-elected for a third term as prime minister after defeating Emani Fakaotimanava-Lui in a close vote of 11–9.
