= Pavihi =

Pavihi is a surname of Oceanian origin.

== People with the surname ==
- Aokuso Pavihi, Niuean politician
- Esther Pavihi, Niuean journalist and politician
- Penei Pavihi (born 1999), American Samoan gridiron football player

== See also ==
- Pavia
