= Tofua Puletama =

Niuean politician from 1999 to 2011

Member of the Niuean Parliament for Makefu
- Incumbent
- Assumed office 12 April 2014
- Preceded by: Salilo Tongia

Member of the Niuean Parliament for Makefu
- In office 19 March 1999 – 7 May 2011
- Preceded by: Ataloma Misihepi
- Succeeded by: Salilo Tongia

Tofua Puletama is a Niuean politician and Member of the Niue Assembly.

Puletama is a long-serving member of the Assembly who was first elected at the 1999 Niuean general election. He was re-elected unopposed at the 2002 election. He lost his seat at the 2011 election by a single vote. An election petition challenging the result was dismissed. He regained his seat in the 2014 election. He was re-elected in the 2017 and 2020 elections. He was re-elected again in the 2023 election.
