= Patricia Rex =

Niuean politician (1918–2004)

Patricia Rex QSO

Member of the Niue Assembly
- In office 1975–1993
- Constituency: Island-wide

Personal details
- Born: 1918 Niue
- Died: 21 January 2004 (aged 85–86) Niue
- Spouse: Robert Rex (m. 1941; died 1992)
- Children: 4

The flag of Niue as designed by Rex

Tuagatagaloa Patricia Rex, Lady Rex QSO (née Vatolo; 1918 – 21 January 2004) was a Niuean politician. The wife of Niue's first Premier Robert Rex, she was jointly one of the first women elected to the Niue Assembly. She also designed the flag of Niue.

== Biography ==
Born Patricia Tuagatagaloa Vatolo, Rex was from the village of Alofi. In 1941 she married Robert Rex and the couple had four children. Her husband went on to become the Leader of Government Business, and in 1974 was appointed as the first Premier of Niue.

Rex contested the island-wide constituency in the April 1975 elections and was elected to the Niue Assembly, becoming one of the first women elected to the legislature alongside Lapati Paka. She remained a member of the Assembly until losing her seat in the 1993 elections. Rex also designed the flag of Niue, which was adopted in 1975.

In the 1991 Queen's Birthday Honours, Rex was appointed a Companion of the Queen's Service Order for community service.

Rex died in Niue in January 2004.
