= Richard Hipa =

Niuean politician (1957–2025)

Richard Starkie Hipa (19 January 1957 – 20 January 2025) was a Niuean politician who was a member of the Niue Assembly, and was first elected at the 2020 elections. While he initially planned to run in the constituency of Alofi north, he ultimately ran as a candidate on the common roll. Hipa received 440 votes in the election, which gave him the most votes in the election. This led to speculation that he would put his name forward as a contender for Premier, something Hipa confirmed, but ultimately he did not put his name forward and the election was contested between Dalton Tagelagi and O'Love Jacobsen.

Prior to his election, Hipa held the role of Secretary of Government, the senior civil servant role on the island. He left the role early and it ended in court action taken by the government against him. The case was eventually settled out of court.

In August 2021 he was medevaced to Auckland, New Zealand, in a critical condition.

Hipa retired due to ill-health at the 2023 election. He died in Auckland on 20 January 2025, at the age of 67.
