= Va'aiga =

Va'aiga is a given name. Notable people with the given name include:

- Va'aiga Tuigamala (1969–2022), Samoan rugby league player
- Va'aiga Tukuitonga, Niuean politician
