= Tagelagi =

Tagelagi is a surname. Notable people with the surname include:

- Dalton Tagelagi (born 1968), prime minister of Niue

- Sam Pata Emani Tagelagi (1935–2011), Niuean politician, father of Dalton

- Matthew Faleuka Tagelagi (born 1979), Niuean rugby union football wing and fullback
