= Bill Vakaafi Motufoou =

Niuean politician

Bill Vakaafi Motufoou is a Niuean politician and former Cabinet Minister.

Motufoou was the General Secretary for the Mutalau Village Council and Committee Member of the Niue Island Organic Farming Association (NIOFA) before entering politics.

He was first elected into the Niue Assembly as Assemblyman for the Village of Mutalau in the 1999 Niuean general election. He was re-elected at the 2002 election and appointed Minister of Works, Agriculture and Fisheries in the government of Young Vivian. In 2004 he was the Niuean delegate at the senior officers meeting of the Food and Agriculture Organization of the United Nations. He was re-elected in 2005 and reappointed to Cabinet. He was re-elected unopposed at the 2008 election, but not appointed to Toke Talagi's cabinet. He finally lost his seat on a coin toss to Maureen Melekitama at the 2017 election.
