= Tahafa Pope Talagi =

Niuean politician

Member of the Assembly
- In office 1975–1984
- Constituency: Common roll

Personal details
- Died: July 1984 (aged 46); New Zealand

Tahafa Pope Talagi (died July 1984) was a Niuean politician. He served as a member of the Assembly from 1975 until his death.

== Biography ==
After training at the LMS Training School in Western Samoa, Talagi began a career as a teacher. In 1950 he joined the new London Missionary Society school as assistant to the headteacher. He later joined the civil service to work for the broadcasting department, becoming editor of Tohi Tala Niue weekly paper and a government information officer. He was also president of the Public Service Association.

He returned to education, becoming headmaster of Matalave Primary School, and was also elected chairman of Tuapa village council. In 1975 he resigned to contest the common roll seats in the elections that year and was elected to the Assembly with the highest number of votes on the roll. Prior to the 1984 elections, he travelled to New Zealand for medical treatment. Despite being away from the island, he received the highest number of votes on the common roll. However, he died a few months later while still in New Zealand at the age of 46.
