= Aokuso =

Aokuso is a name of Oceanian origin.

== People with the given name ==
- Aokuso Pavihi, Niuean politician

== People with the surname ==
- Zitina Aokuso (born 1998), Australian professional basketball player
- Paulo Aokuso (born 1997), Australian boxer

== See also ==
- Kuso
