= John Tofo Funaki =

Niuean politician

Speaker of the Niue Assembly
- In office 1993–1999
- Preceded by: Sam Pata Emani Tagelagi
- Succeeded by: Tama Lati Posimani

Personal details
- Born: 28 May 1933
- Died: 19 November 2023 (aged 90) Niue

John Tofo Funaki (28 May 1933 – 19 November 2023) was a Niuean politician and government official who served as the Speaker of the Niue Assembly from 1993 to 1999.

== Biography ==
Funaki was born on 28 May 1933. He received a scholarship and received education in New Zealand, attending King's College in Christchurch. In 1953, he started working for the New Zealand Resident Commissioners Office, and he then worked for multiple government departments in the subsequent years, including the education, health, justice and treasury departments. He was one of the "leading public servants" in Niue as the country became self-governing and adopted their constitution in 1974. In 1975, he was given the position of Public Defender, remaining in that role for 10 years.

Funaki served as Secretary to Justice starting in 1985 and then land titling manager from 1989 until his retirement from public service in 1990. He was named a land commissioner for the land division of the Niue High Court in 1991. In 1993, he was elected the speaker of the Niue Assembly, succeeding Sam Pata Emani Tagelagi and being the second person to hold the position. He remained in that role until being succeeded by Tama Lati Posimani in 1999. He was later nominated again to be speaker in 2002, although he was not elected.

Funaki was married and had several children. In 2020, he was honored at the inaugural 2020 Niue National Awards as the first recipient of the Niue Public Service Medal, "for his more than 36 years of dedication and commitment to serving the government and the people of Niue." He died on 19 November 2023, at the age of 90.
