= 1966 Niuean general election =

- 9 April 1966

All 20 seats in the Assembly 11 seats needed for a majority

General elections were held in Niue on 9 April 1966.

== Campaign ==
Five of the fourteen seats in the Legislative Assembly had only a single candidate, with the other nine constituencies seeing a contest between two and four candidates.

== Results ==
Constitutency	Elected member
Alofi North	Arumaki Strickland
Alofi South	Robert Rex
Avatele	Ikimotu Paelo
Hakupu	Siakisoni
Hikutavate	Limatau Poepata
Lakepa	Kaliatama
Liku	Falani Nototau
Makefu	Togiatule Elesoni
Mutalau	Pulefolau Talipule
Namukulu	Felesi
Tamakautoga	Peika Taiea
Toi	Liumaihetau
Tuapa	Phigia
Vaiea	Talaiti
Source: Pacific Islands Monthly

== Aftermath ==
Following the elections, Robert Rex was elected as Leader of Government Business on 26 April. Siakisoni, Strickland and Talipule were also elected onto the Executive Council. A Member System was introduced later in the year, with Rex becoming responsible for Public Works and Electricity, Siakisoni for Police and Prison Affairs, Strickland for Radio and Telephone Services and Talipule for the Post Office.
