= Sisilia Talagi =

Niuean politician (born 1952)

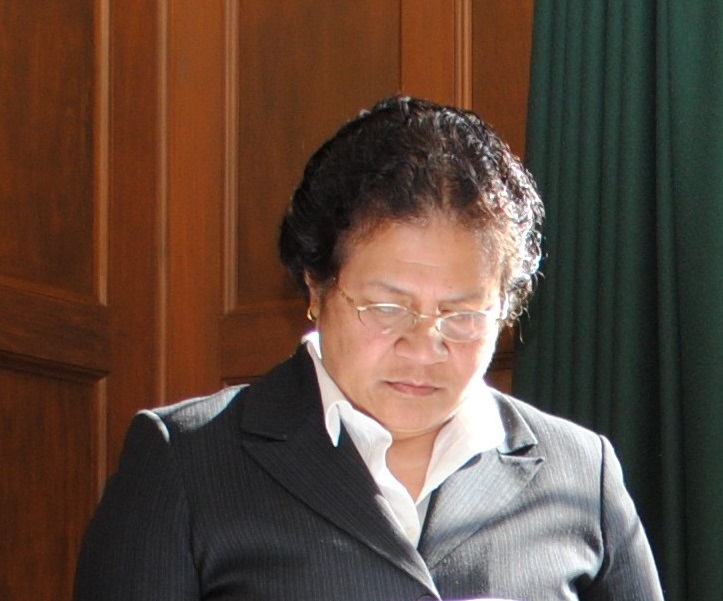
- Sisilia Talagi in 2010

High Commissioner of Niue to New Zealand
- In office 2005 – March 2011
- Preceded by: Hima Douglas
- Succeeded by: O'Love Jacobsen

Personal details
- Born: 27 February 1952 (age 74)

Grace Sisilia Tupou Talagi (born February 27, 1952) is a Niuean diplomat and former High Commissioner of Niue to New Zealand (2005-2011). She earned a Bachelor of Science degree in chemistry and a Certificate of Law from the University of Otago in New Zealand. During the early 1980s, she was a Research Fellow with the Institute of Research, Extension and Training in Agriculture (IRETA) of the University of the South Pacific, Alafua, Western Samoa.

She served as the Director of the Department of Agriculture, Forestry and Fisheries for Niue (1988-1994) and as the Head of External Affairs (1994-1999) before becoming the Secretary for the Government of Niue (1999-2005). She was first appointed High Commissioner to New Zealand (based in Wellington, New Zealand) in 2005, and the Niue Public Service Commission confirmed her reappointment to a second term in November 2008. During the 2008 election, she reportedly competed against six other candidates from New Zealand and Niue for the position. New Zealand is the only country in the world in which Niue exchanges diplomatic representatives. Talagi was succeeded as High Commissioner to New Zealand in March 2011 by former Cabinet minister O'Love Jacobsen.

Talagi is Niue's first female diplomat and the first woman to hold the post of High Commissioner.
