= 2024 Niuean village council elections =

Local elections in Niue

- 31 August 2024

Village council elections were held in Niue on 31 August 2024 to elect members of the village councils of all fourteen villages. However, in only four villages were there more candidates than seats to fill, so all other candidates were elected unopposed. The elections were held alongside four nationwide referendums.

== Electoral system ==
Niue uses a multiple non-transferable vote system to elect members to the Village Council. Voters will select five candidates, and whichever five candidates receives the most votes, will be elected.

== Background ==
The public notice of the election was announced on 8 August. Electoral rolls were opened on 14 August, and closed on 20 August. Voters could only register during that time. The candidate list was announced on 23 August. Only villages that nominated more than five candidates would vote on candidates.

== Results ==
=== Alofi Tokelau (North) ===
Candidate	Notes
Sione Kaulima	Elected unopposed
Ngiar Estalui Tibora Pearson	Elected unopposed
Haven Siosikefu	Elected unopposed
Margaret Siosikefu	Elected unopposed
Ane Strickland	Elected unopposed

=== Alofi Toga (South) ===
Candidate	Notes
Robin Hekau	Elected unopposed
Anthea Hekau-Harding	Elected unopposed
Ettie Lotomaanu Pasene-Mizziebo	Elected unopposed
Alana Fiafia Richmond Rex	Elected unopposed
Narita Viliamu	Elected unopposed

=== Avatele ===
Candidate	Notes
Hetututama Speedo Hetutu	Elected unopposed
Taihia Hetutu	Elected unopposed
Emeline Laufoli	Elected unopposed
Jodi Laufoli	Elected unopposed
Tifaga Tupuiliu	Elected unopposed

=== Hakupu ===
Candidate	Notes
Pacific Enterprise Mautama	Elected unopposed
Patlin Siligi	Elected unopposed
Andre Maurice Siohane	Elected unopposed
Dempster J S Tomailuga	Elected unopposed
Itzy Viviani Tukuitoga	Elected unopposed

=== Hikutavake ===
Candidate	Notes
Emi Hipa	Elected unopposed
Olevai Pipitolu	Elected unopposed
Felicity lulioonta Pulehetoa	Elected unopposed
Antony Guz Tohovaka	Elected unopposed
Peter Vatanofiki	Elected unopposed

=== Lakepa ===
Candidate	Votes	%	Notes
Trevor Tiaka	43	87.76%	Elected
Luandor Meteor Tiaka	39	79.59%	Elected
Ezra Kenneth Togiamana	38	77.55%	Elected
David Togiavalu	38	77.55%	Elected
Myrtle Hanisi Magatogia	32	65.31%	Elected
Tongariro Reekie Konelio	24	48.98%	
Total	49	100.00%	—N/a

=== Liku ===
Candidate	Votes	%	Notes
Trina Kaiuha	32	74.42%	Elected
Christian Poumale	31	72.09%	Elected
Simi Tominiko	30	69.77%	Elected
Sionetasi Pulehetoa	29	67.44%	Elected
Newland T Poumale	21	48.84%	Elected
Sifakalipa M Pulehetoa	20	46.51%	
Total	43	100.00%	—N/a

=== Makefu ===
Candidate	Votes	%	Notes
Etaena Poihega	32	91.43%	Elected
Marcus Puletama	26	74.29%	Elected
Ernie Judy Tohovaka	22	62.86%	Elected
Tioneatali Kemusiaki Lolani	19	54.29%	Elected
Charles Tohovaka	14	40.00%	Elected
Mary Anne Talagi	13	37.14%	
Total	35	100.00%	—N/a

=== Mutalau ===
Candidate	Votes	%	Notes
Harry Seddon T Paka	40	97.56%	Elected
Emeline Matagiaga	39	95.12%	Elected
Dave Belakula Togakilo	30	73.17%	Elected
Moka Heleena Togakilo	30	73.17%	Elected
Pelenato Bourne	28	68.29%	Elected
Meleki Tauefasi	22	53.66%	
Jean Elota Pulefolau	10	24.39%	
Total	41	100.00%	—N/a

=== Namukulu ===
Darren Tohovaka, the Chief Electoral Officer, confirmed that Namukulu would only be able to nominate two candidates.

Candidate	Notes
Kilimana Hiligutu	Elected unopposed
Fenogalaia Sionetuato	Elected unopposed

=== Tamakautoga ===
Candidate	Notes
Tafakato Huipunu Paola	Elected unopposed
Hiki Togia Puheke	Elected unopposed
Lavea Amanaki Puheke	Elected unopposed
John Divine Paola Talagi	Elected unopposed
Matakai Tina Tavita	Elected unopposed

=== Toi ===
Candidate	Notes
Lilivika Muimatagi	Elected unopposed
Pualino Tokimua	Elected unopposed
Winnie Taleni Seu Woods	Elected unopposed

=== Tuapa ===
Candidate	Notes
Kulupatau Ikihele	Elected unopposed
Harris Ikitule	Elected unopposed
Halafoou Mokalei	Elected unopposed
Priscilla Iloilo	Elected unopposed
Sione Pokau	Elected unopposed

=== Vaiea ===
Candidate	Notes
Merry Madaniel Talaiti	Elected unopposed
Takala Talaiti	Elected unopposed
Tuaitama Talaiti	Elected unopposed
