= 2020 Niue National Awards =

The 2020 Niue National Awards were the first awards made under the Niue National Awards system to recognise achievement and service by Niueans. They were announced in October 2022.

The recipients of honours are displayed here as they were styled before their new honour.

== Niue Distinguished Service Cross (NDSC) ==
- Young Vivian
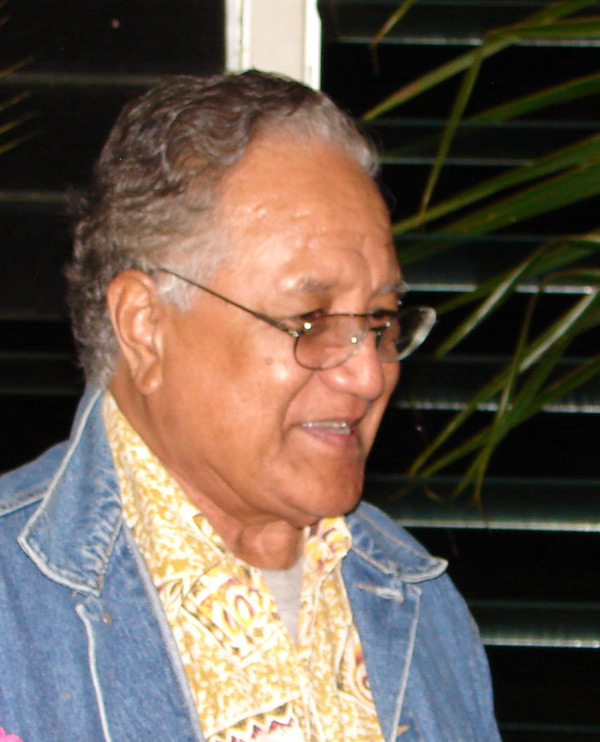
Young Vivian

== Niue Public Service Medal (NPSM) ==
- John Tofo Funaki

== Niue Community Service Star (NCSS) ==
- Narita Viliamu Tahega
