= Flag of Niue =

Niue
- Flag of Niue
- Use: Civil and state flag
- Proportion: 1:2
- Adopted: 15 October 1975
- Design: A golden yellow flag with the Union Flag in the upper left (canton) quarter. On the Union Flag, the Saint George's Cross is charged with a yellow five-pointed star on each arm and a blue disc with another, slightly larger, yellow five-pointed star in the centre.
- Designed by: Patricia Rex

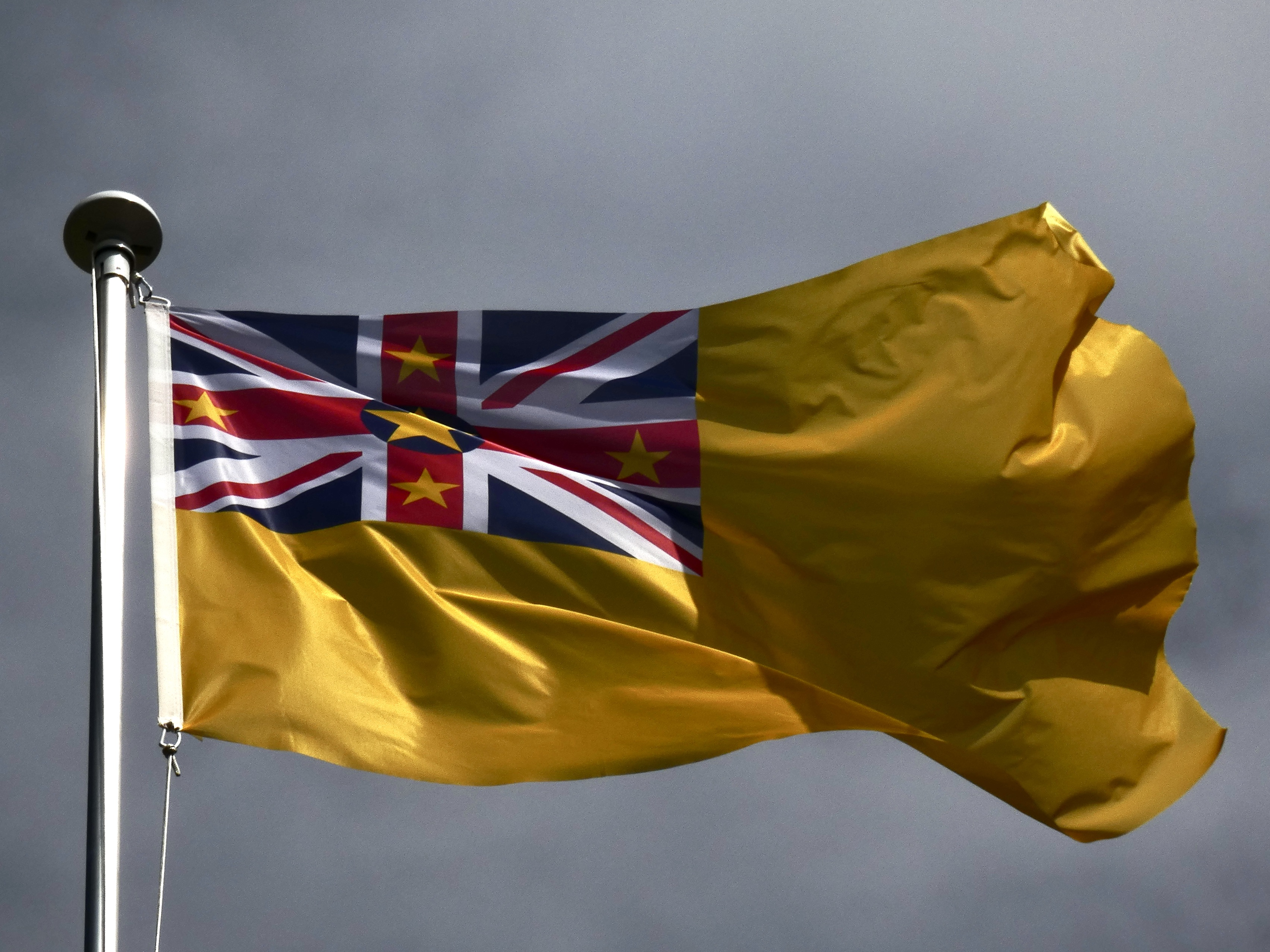
Flag of Niue at the Commonwealth Games, Birmingham, 2022

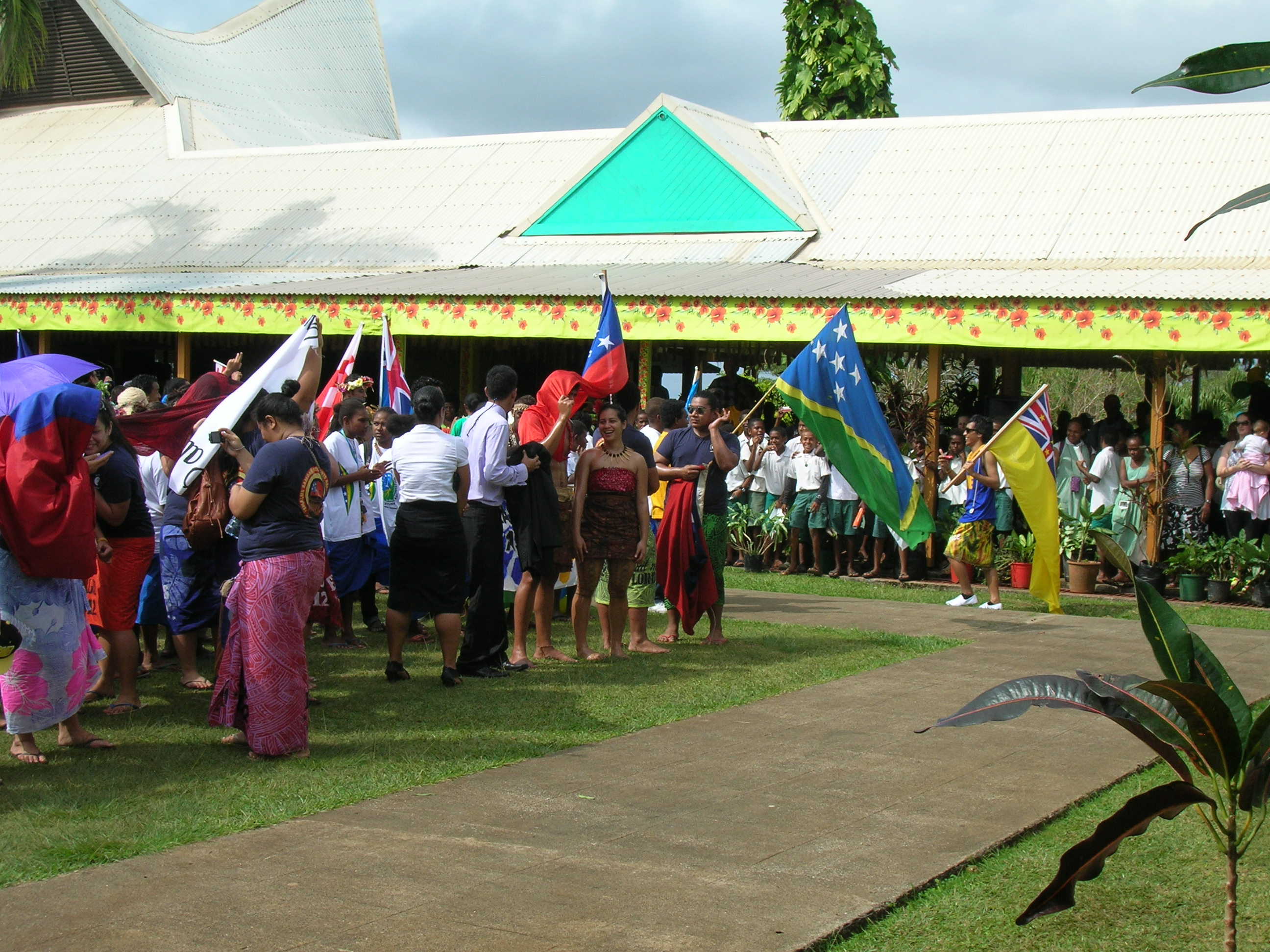
Niue flag visible at right.

The flag of Niue was adopted on 15 October 1975. It consists of the Union Jack in the upper left corner with a star in the middle of the Union Jack and four stars forming a diamond around it. It is very unusual for a flag based on a British ensign design, in having not only a yellow background, but also a defaced Union Jack in the canton. It was designed by Patricia Rex, the wife of the then-Premier Robert Rex.

== Definition ==
From the Niue Flag Act 1975: "The Niue National Flag shall be a golden yellow flag, bearing on the upper canton of the hoist there of the Union Flag, commonly known as the Union Jack, displaying two five-pointed yellow stars on the vertical line and on the horizontal line thereof separated by a blue disc containing a larger five-pointed yellow star." In 2023, it was noted that a number of funerals for former Members of Parliament were using flags that did not follow the prescribed colours in the Niue Flag Act. The government of Niue responded to state that they were going to address the issue.

== Symbolism ==
The symbolism represented by the flag is described in the Act. The Union Jack symbolises the protection granted by the United Kingdom in 1900 after petitioning by the Kings and Chiefs of Niue. The yellow field symbolises "the bright sunshine of Niue and the warm feelings of the Niuean people towards New Zealand and her people." The association with New Zealand, which took over responsibility and administration of Niue in 1901, is also represented by the four small stars that depict the Southern Cross. Finally, the blue disc containing a larger star represents the deep blue sea surrounding the self-governing island of Niue.

== See also ==
- Seal of Niue
- List of New Zealand flags
