= Sani Lakatani =

Premier of Niue from 1999 to 2002

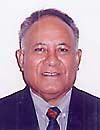
- Lakatani in 2000

Premier of Niue
- In office 26 March 1999 – 1 May 2002
- Governor-General: Michael Hardie Boys; Silvia Cartwright
- Preceded by: Frank Lui
- Succeeded by: Young Vivian

Minister of Finance
- In office 27 February 1993 – October 1994
- Premier: Frank Lui
- Preceded by: Young Vivian
- Succeeded by: Terry Coe
- In office 7 April 1990 – September 1990
- Premier: Robert Rex
- Succeeded by: Young Vivian

Member of Parliament for Common roll
- In office 7 April 1990 – November 2004

Personal details
- Born: 4 June 1936 Niue
- Died: 17 January 2026 (aged 89) Wellington, New Zealand
- Party: Niue People's Party

Sani Elia Lagigietama Lakatani (4 June 1936 – 17 January 2026) was a Premier of Niue. He was a member of the Niue People's Party.

== Early life ==
Lakatani served in the New Zealand Army as a corporal. He was deployed to Vietnam as part of the Whiskey2 deployment.

== Political career ==
=== Early career ===
Lakatani was first elected to the Niue Assembly in the 1990 election as a candidate for Young Vivian's Niue People's Action Party (NPAP). On election night the NPAP believed it had a majority, but a leadership dispute between Vivian and Lakatani saw a group of MP's led by the latter switch sides to support Premier Robert Rex, who was elected on a 12–8 vote. Lakatani was appointed to Rex's Cabinet as Minister of Finance, but was sacked just five months later after circulating a petition calling for a change of leadership.

He was re-elected in 1993 and reappointed Finance Minister by Frank Lui. He resigned in March 1994, but was reinstated by Lui in the leadup to a confidence vote. He subsequently lost his finance portfolio in a cabinet reshuffle in October 1994 and resigned from Cabinet on 8 November. Lakatani joined the opposition, which organised itself into the Niue People's Party and effectively deadlocked the assembly. With other members of the opposition, Lakatani boycotted meetings of the Public Expenditure Committee, and as a result his seat was declared vacant in August 1995. He was reinstated after a successful challenge before the High Court and the new Niue Court of Appeal, but in the interim was re-elected, coming sixth on the common roll in the 1996 election.

In October 1995 Lakatani was charged with 22 counts of bribery and two of official corruption. Most of the charges were dismissed after the Niue Court of Appeal found that the law against corruption did not apply to Members of the Assembly, and the remaining charges were later dropped.

=== Premiership ===
Lakatani was re-elected at the 1999 Niuean general election, placing third on the common roll with 474 votes. He was subsequently elected leader of the Niue People's Party, and was elected Premier, defeating O'Love Jacobsen by 14 votes to 6. As Premier, he cut the pay of MPs, unsuccessfully attempted to obtain a loan from the Asian Development Bank to counteract declining assistance from New Zealand, and attempted to establish an airline. In July 1999 he was hospitalised in Auckland and underwent a double bypass heart operation. In his absence, the growing unpopularity of his government saw it lose its majority. A no-confidence vote in December resulted in a 10–10 tie, a judicial challenge, and an opposition walkout. In 2000, he narrowly avoided bankruptcy over a personal guarantee given for the debt of a Niue business, and this resulted in a further confidence vote which was again tied, 9-9. Lakatani faced a further confidence vote in November 2000. While Prime Minister he served as Chancellor of the University of the South Pacific.

=== Later career ===
Lakatani was re-elected in 2002 Niuean general election, but his dictatorial leadership style saw him lose the leadership of the People's Party to Young Vivian, who subsequently became Premier, with Lakatani as his Deputy. In August 2002 he was sacked from Cabinet after voting against the budget.

In 2003 he took an extended leave from the Assembly to look after his wife in Auckland. He resigned from the Assembly in June 2004.

== Death ==
Lakatani died in Wellington on 17 January 2026, at the age of 89.

Government offices
Preceded by Frank Lui	Premier of Niue; 1999–2002	Succeeded by Young Vivian
