= Salilo Tongia =

Niuean politician

Member of the Niuean Parliament for Makefu
- In office 7 May 2011 – 12 April 2014
- Preceded by: Tofua Puletama
- Succeeded by: Tofua Puletama

Taulelehemaama Salilo Tongia is a Niuean politician.

Tongia was first elected to the Niue Assembly in the 2011 election, ousting Tofua Puletama from Makefu in a close result. The result was unsuccessfully challenged in an election petition.
