= Lapati Paka =

Niuean politician

Member of the Niue Assembly
- In office 1975–
- Constituency: Island-wide

Lapati Paka was a Niuean politician. She was jointly one of the first women elected to the Niue Assembly.

== Biography ==
Originally from Mutalau, Paka was the daughter of Togakilo, a member of the Legislative Assembly, and began her career as a nurse. After taking a home economics course in Suva, she joined the civil service as a Women's Interest Officer in 1965. She also became secretary of the Women's Club.

She contested the island-wide constituency in the April 1975 elections and was elected to the Niue Assembly, becoming one of the first women elected to the legislature alongside Patricia Rex. Her father was also re-elected in the same election.

She later became president of the Niue Council of Women.
