= 2022 Niue National Awards =

The 2022 Niue National Awards were awards made under the Niue National Awards system to recognise achievement and service by Niueans. They were announced on 19 October 2022.

The recipients of honours are displayed here as they were styled before their new honour.

== Niue Distinguished Service Cross (NDSC) ==
- Pokotoa Ikiua Lalotoa Sipeli

== Niue Public Service Medal (NPSM) ==
- Fakahulahetoa Funaki
- Atapana Siakimotu

== Niue Community Service Star (NCSS) ==
- Sergeant Albert Tasmania
- Launoa Gataua
- Robert (BJ) Rex
- Pitasoni Mahalo Tanaki
