= Fisa Igilisi Pihigia =

Niuean politician and diplomat

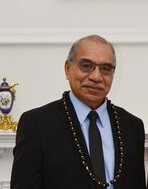
- Fisa Igilisi Pihigia in April 2017

High Commissioner of Niue to New Zealand
- Incumbent
- Assumed office 13 March 2017
- Preceded by: O'Love Jacobsen

Fisa Igilisi Pihigia is a Niuean politician and diplomat. Since 2017 he has been High Commissioner of Niue to New Zealand.

Pihigia worked as a public servant and was appointed Collector of Customs before entering politics. He was a long-serving member of the Niue Assembly for Tuapa, being elected continuously from 1990 to 2014. He served in the Cabinet of Frank Lui between 1993 and 1999, and that of Young Vivian from 2002 to 2008, filling a variety of portfolios including broadcasting, police, finance and health. In March 2017 he was appointed Niue's High Commissioner to New Zealand, replacing O'Love Jacobsen.

He stood on the common roll in the 2023 Niuean general election, but was unsuccessful.
