= 1993 Niuean general election =

- 27 February 1993

All 20 seats in the Assembly 11 seats needed for a majority
Premier before election
Young Vivian
Independent
Elected Premier
Frank Lui
Independent

General elections were held in Niue on 27 February 1993. Voter turnout was 91%.

Following the election Frank Lui was elected Premier of Niue, defeating incumbent Young Vivian 11–9. John Tofo Funaki was elected Speaker.
