= Niue National Awards =

Honors system of pacific island Niue

The Niue National Awards is a system of orders, decorations and medals to recognise the achievements of, or service by, Niueans. It was established in 2020. Previously Niue had fallen under the New Zealand royal honours system. The awards are decided by the National Awards Committee and announced each year on Constitution Day, 19 October.

There are three levels of awards:

- The Niue Distinguished Service Cross (NDSC) for distinguished service, for those who have "contributed many years of outstanding service to the people and nation of Niue";
- The Niue Public Service Medal (NPSM) for those who have contributed significantly as members of the Niue Public Service; and
- The Niue Community Service Star (NCSS) for community service.

The first awards were made in October 2020. Successive awards have been made in 2021, 2022, and 2023.

== Notable Recipients ==
- Niue Distinguished Service Cross
  - Jack Willie Lipitoa
  - Pokotoa Sipeli
  - Young Vivian
- Niue Public Service Medal
  - Atapana Siakimotu
- Niue Community Service Star
  - Michael Jackson (journalist)
  - Narita Viliamu Tahega

== See also ==
- civil awards and decorations
- order (distinction)
