= Va'aiga Tukuitonga =

Niuean politician

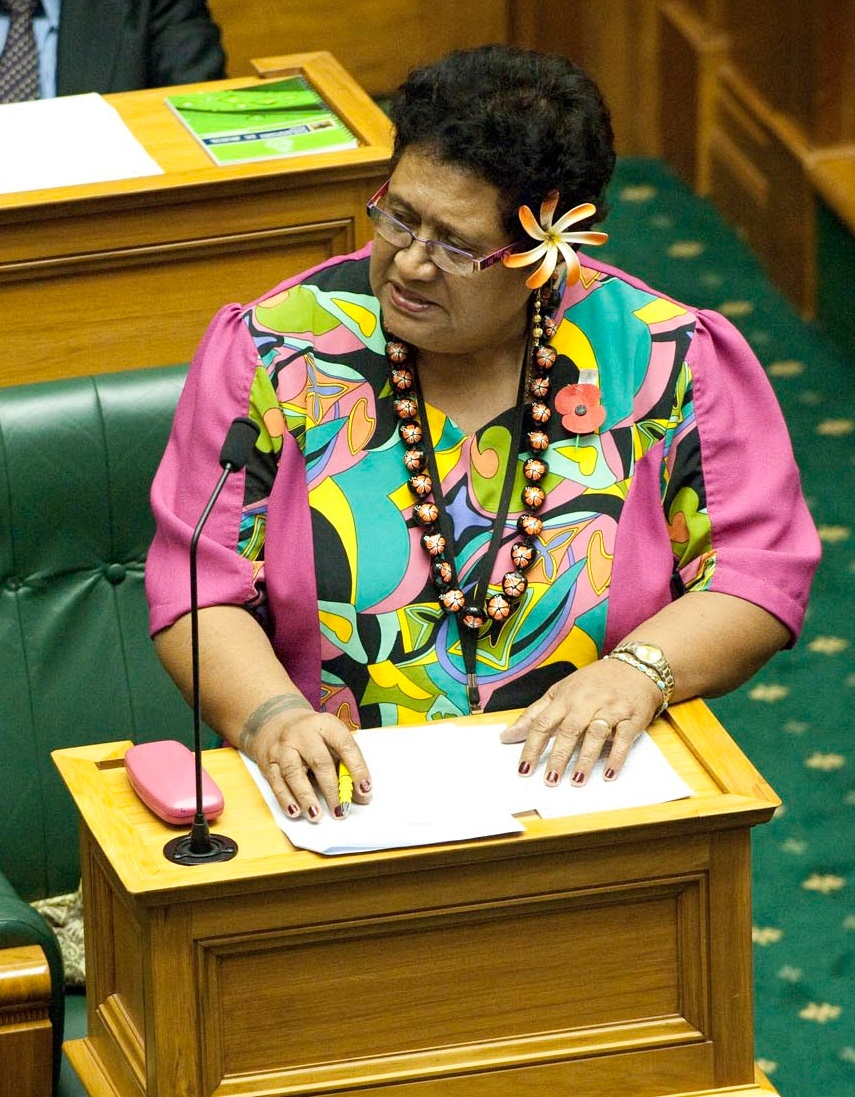
Va'iga Tukiitonga speaking in the NZ Parliament in 2013

Va'aiga Paotama Tukuitonga is a Niuean politician and former Cabinet Minister. She is a member of the Niue Assembly for the village of Alofi North.

Tukuitonga was educated at Victoria University of Wellington. She has previously worked as a Justice of the Peace, public servant, and schoolteacher. She was first elected to the Assembly in the 1999 elections, defeating sitting Premier Frank Lui in his own seat. She was re-elected in the 2002 and 2005 elections, and appointed to the Cabinet of Young Vivian as Minister of Education after the latter. She was elected unopposed in the 2008 election.

In 2013, Tukuitonga blamed Niue's falling population on the use of contraception.

Tukuitonga retired from politics in the 2023 Niuean general election.
