= 2021 Niue National Awards =

The 2021 Niue National Awards were awards made under the Niue National Awards system to recognise achievement and service by Niueans. They were announced on 19 October 2021.

The recipients of honours are displayed here as they were styled before their new honour.

== Niue Distinguished Service Cross (NDSC) ==
- Jack Willie Lipitoa QSM

== Niue Public Service Medal (NPSM) ==
- Sabina Aue Fakanaiki
- Janet Sipeli-Tasmania

== Niue Community Service Star (NCSS) ==
- Manasofai Sifahoi Viliamu Talagi
- Alan Tano Puleoti
