= Arumaki Strickland =

Niuean politician

Member for Radio and Telephone Services
- In office 1966–1969

Member of the Niue Assembly
- In office 1960–1969
- Constituency: Alofi North

Personal details
- Born: Cook Islands
- Died: 9 September 1971 (aged 69) Alofi, Niue

Arumaki Strickland (died 9 September 1971) was a Cook Islands-born businessman and politician in Niue. He served as a member of the Niue Assembly for several years, and was a member of the Executive Council, serving as Member for Radio and Telephone Services.

== Biography ==
Born in the Cook Islands, Strickland ran a bakery in Rarotonga. He became Secretary of the Cook Islands Workers' Union and managed the Cook Islands Native Association. He moved to Niue in 1947 to open a bakery, and subsequently became involved in several other business ventures, including a trading firm and bus operator, as well as opening the island's first cinema in 1949 and a garage in 1970.

In the first elections to the Niue Island Assembly in 1960, Stickland was elected from the Alofi North constituency. After being re-elected in 1966, he was elected onto the Executive Council. Later in the same year, a Member System was introduced, with Stickland appointed Member for Radio and Telephone Services. However, he retired from his political roles in 1969 due to ill health.

Strickland died in hospital in Alofi in September 1971 at the age of 69. He was survived by his wife and twelve children.
