= High Commissioner of Niue to New Zealand =

Niue diplomatic representative

The high commissioner of Niue to New Zealand is the top-ranking diplomatic representative of Niue to New Zealand. Niue is in free association with New Zealand and lacks full sovereignty. New Zealand is the only country in the world in which Niue exchanges diplomatic representation.

This office was established in 2001; Hima Takelesi was appointed the first Niue High Commissioner to New Zealand, after resigning from the Niue Assembly in August 2001.

== List ==
Person	Period in office	Refs
Hima Takelesi	2001-2005	
Sisilia Talagi	2005-2011	
O'Love Jacobsen	2011-2017	
Fisa Igilisi Pihigia	2017-currently	
