= Ahohiva Levi =

Niuean politician

Ahohiva Levi is a Niuean politician. He served as Speaker of the Niuean Assembly from 2011 to 2014.

Between 2005 and 2010 he served on the board of the Pacific Islands Association of Non Governmental Organisations.

Levi was elected Speaker following the 2011 election. He was succeeded by Togiavalu Pihigia following the 2014 election.
