= Frank Lui =

Premier of Niue from 1993 to 1999

The Honourable Frank Lui CNZM

Premier of Niue
- In office 12 March 1993 – 26 March 1999
- Governor-General: Catherine Tizard; Michael Hardie Boys
- Preceded by: Vivian Young
- Succeeded by: Sani Lakatani

Member of the Niue Assembly for Alofi North
- In office 1969 – 19 March 1999
- Preceded by: Arumaki Strickland
- Succeeded by: Va'aiga Tukuitonga
- In office 1963 – 9 April 1966
- Preceded by: Arumaki Strickland
- Succeeded by: Arumaki Strickland

Personal details
- Born: 19 November 1935 Alofi, Niue
- Died: 8 July 2021 (aged 85) Alofi North, Niue
- Party: Independent
- Spouse: Iris Lui

Frank Fakaotimanava Lui CNZM (19 November 1935 – 8 July 2021) was a Niuean politician, who served as the premier of the Pacific Island state of Niue from 1993 to 1999.

== Early life ==
Lui was raised by his grandparents on Niue after his parents and older siblings migrated to Wellington, New Zealand. His parents sent for him when he was nine years old and he attended Newtown School. Soon afterwards, he transferred to Naenae School in Lower Hutt when his parents took the tenancy of a State house there. Lui left Naenae school in 1950 to attend Wellington High School (then Wellington Technical College).

On leaving school, he joined the New Zealand merchant navy, and was immediately caught up in the prolonged and acrimonious waterfront dispute of 1951. He returned to Niue in 1956 to care for his grandparents and has lived there since. There, he was subjected to colonial discrimination which motivated him to political activity to change an oppressive, paternalistic system run by the New Zealand Government (e.g., "natives" of Niue were not permitted to buy liquor, and were paid wages lower than expatriate New Zealanders). He organised the first ever strike on Niue.

== Political career ==
Lui was elected at the 1963 Niuean general election at the age of only 28, becoming the youngest ever person elected to the Niue Assembly. He lost his seat at the 1966 election, but was re-elected in 1969. He was re-elected again in 1972 and appointed Minister of Works and Police in the Cabinet of Robert Rex. He was re-elected unopposed in the 1975 election and was appointed Minister of Electricity, Fisheries, Forests, Tourism, and Works. He served in a variety of other Cabinet positions over the next fifteen years. In September 1990, he was sacked from Cabinet after an attempt to oust Rex.

== Premier ==
Following the death of Robert Rex in December 1992, Young Vivian was elected Premier. Lui was re-elected to the Assembly at the following 1993 election, and on 12 March was elected Premier, defeating Vivian 11 votes to 9. In March 1994, Finance Minister Sani Lakatani resigned from Cabinet, but was reinstated by Lui in the leadup to a confidence vote. Lakatani subsequently resigned from Cabinet on 8 November after losing the finance portfolio in a cabinet reshuffle. He joined the opposition, which organised itself into the Niue People's Party and effectively deadlocked the assembly. A series of tied confidence votes followed, and the government was effectively unable to pass legislation through the Assembly for the rest of its term. An attempt to break the deadlock by declaring the seats of opposition MPs vacant was ultimately declared illegal by the Niue Court of Appeal.

In the 1996 election, Lui was re-elected to his seat, and he was narrowly re-elected as Premier, defeating Robert Rex Jr., by 11 votes to 9. Lui's second-term was more stable, and the government was able to pass anti-corruption laws and a ban on drift-net fishing in its Exclusive Economic Zone. It also partnered with Panamanian law firm Mossack Fonseca to set up an "international business centre" providing shell companies to international clients, and established a free internet service with the Niue Internet Users Society.

Lui lost his seat in the 1999 election, and announced his retirement. He was replaced as premier by Sani Lakatani.

== After politics ==
Following his retirement, Lui ran a video rental business.

In 2010, he became chair of the IUSN Foundation, a charitable foundation which provides Niueans with free internet access.

He died on 8 July 2021 at the age of 85.

== Recognition ==
Lui was appointed a Companion of the New Zealand Order of Merit in the 1999 Queen's Birthday Honours.

Government offices
| Preceded by Young Vivian | Premier of Niue; 1993–1999 | Succeeded by Sani Lakatani |
