= 2024 Niuean constitutional referendum =

- 31 August 2024

A constitutional referendum was held in Niue on 31 August 2024. Four amendments to the constitution were proposed, which were voted on separately. Two of the proposals – to rename the post of premier to prime minister and to identify the Auditor-General of New Zealand as the country's official auditor – were approved. The other two – to increase the number of ministers and extend the term length of the Niue Assembly – were rejected.

== Background ==
The first reading of the constitutional amendment bills took place in March 2024, with the Assembly voting in favour of all four. Although Premier Dalton Tagelagi had proposed proceeding directly to a second reading, the Assembly referred the bills to the Constitution Review Committee. The second reading was approved in May. This was followed by a mandatory 13-week period during which public consultations took place.

Following consultations in 13 of the 14 villages, the bills passed their third reading in early August.

== Proposed amendments ==
The four proposed amendments were (in their order on the ballot):

1. Changing the title of the head of government from premier to prime minister
2. Increasing the size of the cabinet from four to six members
3. Extending the term length of the Assembly from three to four years
4. Identifying the Auditor-General of New Zealand as the country's official auditor rather than a generic reference to the Audit Office of New Zealand.

== Results ==
Question	For		Against		Invalid/ blank	Total votes	Registered voters	Turnout	Outcome
Question	Votes	%	Votes	%	Invalid/ blank	Total votes	Registered voters	Turnout	Outcome
Changing the title of the head of government from premier to prime minister	369	51.46	348	48.54	2	719	1,156	62.20	Approved
Increasing the size of the cabinet from four to six members	221	30.95	493	69.05	5	719	1,156	62.20	Rejected
Extending the term length of the Assembly from three to four years	205	28.59	512	71.41	2	719	1,156	62.20	Rejected
Identifying the Auditor-General of New Zealand as the country's official auditor	413	57.68	303	42.32	3	719	1,156	62.20	Approved
Source: Government of Niue, Broadcasting Corporation of Niue

== Aftermath ==
Hima Douglas, Speaker of the Niue Assembly, officially signed the two approved bills into law on 3 September.
