= 1996 Niuean general election =

- 26 February 1996

All 20 seats in the Assembly 11 seats needed for a majority
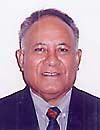
	First party	Second party
	IND
Leader	–	Sani Lakatani
Party	Independents	Niue People's
Last election	1,150	0
Seats won	11	11
Seat change	▼9	▲11
Premier before election
Frank Lui
Independent
Elected Premier
Frank Lui
Independent

General elections were held in Niue on 23 February 1996. Members of the Niue People's Party won nine seats, with independents taking the other eleven. Premier Frank Lui retained his seat and position.
