= Esther Pavihi =

Niuean journalist and politician

Member of the Niue Assembly
- In office 7 June 2008 – 7 May 2011

Personal details
- Born: Gustava Esther Pavihi; 20th century Niue
- Parent: Aokuso Pavihi (father)

Gustava Esther Pavihi is a Niuean journalist and politician.

== Biography ==
She is the daughter of Aokuso Pavihi, the Minister of Finance from 1997 to 1999.

She was once co-manager of the Esther's Village Motel, founded by her father in the village of Avatele. She ran in the 2008 Niuean general election and was elected to the Niue Assembly. A member of Prime Minister Toke Talagi's parliamentary majority, she served several times as Acting Minister of Agriculture, Forestry and Fisheries, replacing Pokotoa Sipeli when he was abroad or indisposed during the 2008-2011 parliamentary term. In this capacity, she chaired, in April 2011, a summit of the Food and Agriculture Organization of the United Nations for the Ministers of Agriculture of the Pacific Oceanian States of the Southwest Pacific (Australia, Cook Islands, Fiji, Kiribati, Micronesia, Nauru, Niue, New Zealand, Papua New Guinea, Samoa, Solomon Islands, Tonga and Vanuatu) in Vavaʻu. In October 2010, she also served as Acting Prime Minister for a few days when Toke Talagi was in China for the 2010 World Expo in Shanghai.

She was unseated in the 2011 Niuean general election, she was also an unsuccessful candidate in 2014, and then in those of 2026.

A journalist for the Broadcasting Corporation of Niue (BCN), company, she became (a senior reporter) head of the BCN news department. In September 2024, she became a member of the board of directors of the Pacific Islands News Association, a regional association for cooperation between media outlets in small Pacific island states, chaired by Tongan journalist Kalafi Moala. She was the representative of television media there.

== See also ==
- Media in Niue
