= Joan Viliamu =

Niuean politician

Joan Sisiati Tahafa Viliamu
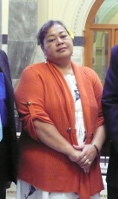

Minister of Health, Minister of Community Affairs, Minister for the Niue Broadcasting Corporation
- In office May 2011 – April 2014
- Succeeded by: Pokotoa Sipeli

Member of the Niuean Parliament for Common roll
- In office May 2011 – June 2020

Personal details
- Born: 22 March 1966 Tuapa, Niue
- Died: 25 November 2022 (aged 56)
- Party: None

Joan Sisiati Tahafa Viliamu (22 March 1966 – 25 November 2022) was a Niuean politician and Cabinet minister.

Viliamu was born in Tuapa and educated at Matalave Primary School and Niue High School Intermediate. She worked as a public servant and businesswoman before being elected to the Niue Assembly on the common roll at the 2011 election. Following the election she was appointed to Cabinet as Minister of Health, the Community Sector, and Minister for the Niue Broadcasting Corporation. She was re-elected in the 2014 Niuean general election but downgraded to an Assistant Minister. She was again re-elected at the 2017 election, but lost her seat at the 2020 election.
