= Atapana Siakimotu =

Niuean politician

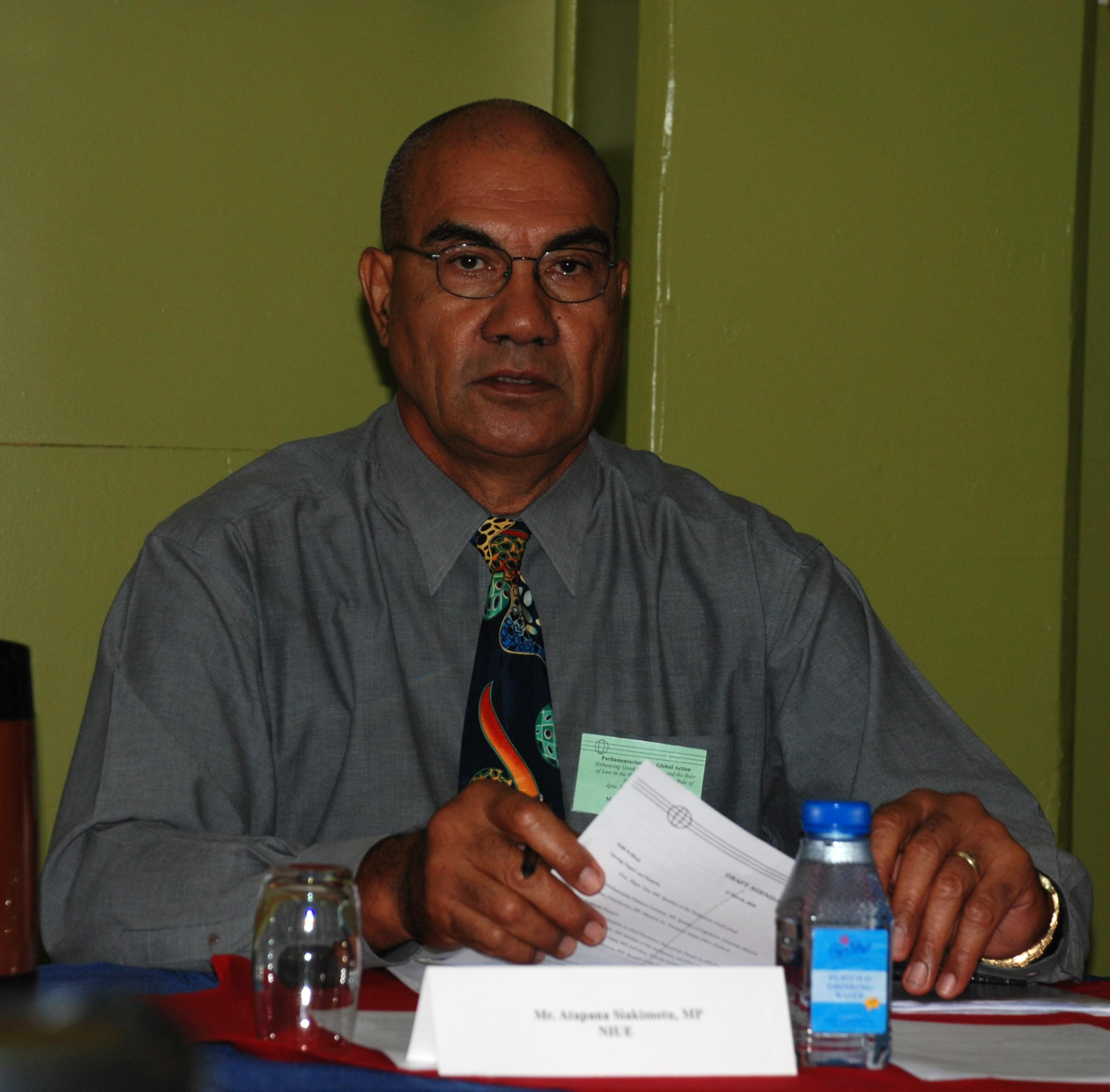
Hon. Atapana Siakimotu in March 2008

Atapana Siakimotu NPSM (c. 1948 – 2022) was a Niuean politician, diplomat, and public servant. He served as the speaker of the Niuean Assembly between 2002 and 2011.

== Biography ==
Siakimotu was educated at Niue High School and Avele College (Apia, Samoa) where he was awarded Dux in his final year. Post-secondary school education includes Lincoln College in New Zealand, graduating with a diploma in horticulture. Atapana's work includes teacher and principal of Niue High School, director of education, and as consul-general to New Zealand. He served in many leadership roles including leading the Niue National Dance Group for the 1984 10 year self-government celebrations and leading the Niue bilingual dictionary which was published in 1997.

In the late 1990's he was appointed as Niue consul-general to New Zealand which was based in Auckland. He worked extensively with Niue communities across New Zealand which included promoting the revitalization of Niue language and strengthening both cultural and economic relationships between New Zealand and Niue. Following this post Siakimotu and his family returned to Avatele Niue. He was appointed speaker of the assembly after the 2002 election, and was re-appointed in 2005 and 2008.

In April 2011, he announced that he would retire at the 2011 election, after serving nine years as speaker. He later served as chair of the Niue Public Service Commission.

Siakimotu contested the seat of Avatele in the 2020 Niuean general election, but was unsuccessful, losing to Poimamao Vakanofiti.

Siakimotu dedicated his life to Niue and the promotion of the vagahau Niue and the aga fakamotu, a composer of Niuean songs and chants, and will be remembered for his commanding voice.

Siakimotu accepted the Niue Public Service Medal as part of the 2022 Niue National Awards but died before he could be presented with the award, which was then presented to his family.
