= Jack Willie Lipitoa =

Niuean politician

Jack Willie Lipitoa QSM NDSC

Member of the Niuean Parliament for Namukulu
- In office 1987 – 29 April 2023
- Preceded by: Enetama Lipitoa
- Succeeded by: Sione Sionetuato

Personal details
- Party: None

Jack Willie Lipitoa QSM NDSC (born c. 1933) is a Niuean politician and former Member of the Niue Assembly. He is the older brother of former Cabinet Minister Enetama Lipitoa.

Lipitoa worked as a teacher, first at Matalave and then at Niue High School. He was first elected to the Niuean Assembly at the 1987 Niuean general election, replacing his brother who had moved to a seat on the common roll. He has been re-elected at every election since. He retired at the 2023 election.

== Honours and awards ==
In 1990, Lipitoa received the New Zealand 1990 Commemoration Medal. He was awarded the Queen's Service Medal in the 1999 Queen's Birthday Honours. At the 2021 Niue National Awards, he was awarded the Niue Distinguished Service Cross.
