= Sam Pata Emani Tagelagi =

Niuean politician (1935–2011)

Sam Pata Emani Tagelagi (29 December 1935 – 10 September 2011) was a Niuean politician and elder. Tagelagi served as the first Speaker of the Niue Assembly from 1976 to 1993.

== Biography ==
From 1958 until 1963, Tagelagi worked as an employee of the New Zealand Internal Affairs and Island Territories Department. He later served as the head of inland revenue, Niuean customs comptroller, and treasurer. Aside from his long tenure as Niue's first Speaker, Tagelagi was also a member of many Niuean government committees. He served actively on the Alofi village council until his death in 2011.

Within business, he served as the Niue Development Bank's general manager and owned an accounting firm.

Sam Pata Emani Tagelagi died from a long illness at his home in Alofi, Niue, on 10 September 2011, at the age of 76. He was survived by his wife Etena Elovi (née Hekau) Tagelagi, his daughter and four sons. In 2020 his son Dalton Tagelagi was elected Premier of Niue.
