= 2002 Niuean general election =

- 21 March 2002

All 20 seats in the Assembly 11 seats needed for a majority
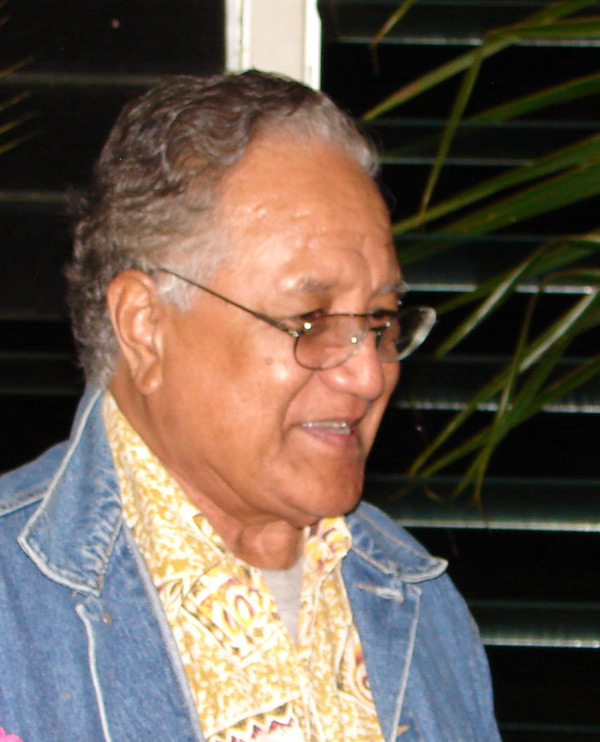
	First party
Candidate	Young Vivian
Party	Niue People's
Premier before election
Sani Lakatani
Niue People's
Elected Premier
Young Vivian
Niue People's

General elections were held in Niue on 21 March 2002 to determine the composition of the twenty member Assembly.

All twenty outgoing members were re-elected, of which eight (all of them village representatives) were running unopposed. Voter turnout was close to 100%. The Niue People's Party obtained six seats, and was able to form a government with the support of eight independent members. The remaining six seats were also held by independents.

Young Vivian (NPP) became Premier. Sani Lakatani was his deputy. Atapana Siakimotu was elected Speaker.

== Results ==
Party	Seats
Niue People's Party	6
Independents	14
Total	20
Source: The Commonwealth
