= Enetama Lipitoa =

Niuean politician

Enetama Lipi is a former politician from Niue. He was an Assemblyman for Namukulu when he was elected into the Niue Legislative Assembly and was appointed to the Executive Council following the 1972 election. In 1973 he served as part of the negotiating team which negotiated the terms of Niue's self-government. He became a Cabinet Minister in Robert Rex's first Government following the attainment of self-government status by Niue on 19 October 1974.

The son of Nogihau and Lipitoa of Namukulu, Lipitoa graduated in 1957 from Fiji School of Medicine. He moved residence to his wife's home village of Lakepa while still holding his MP seat for Namukulu. He was elected MP for Lakepa before retiring.

The Assemblyman post made vacant by Lipitoa was taken over by his older brother, Jack Willie Lipitoa, a retired technical drawing and woodwork teacher of Niue High School.
