= Togiavalu Pihigia =

Niuean politician

Togiavalu Pihigia is a Niuean politician and former Speaker of the Niue Assembly.

He was elected Speaker of the House by the Niue Assembly on 12 April 2014 by a 12–8 vote. In 2020 he lost the position to Hima Douglas.
