= Young Vivian =

Premier of Niue (1992–1993; 2002–2008)

The Honourable Young Vivian CNZM NDSC
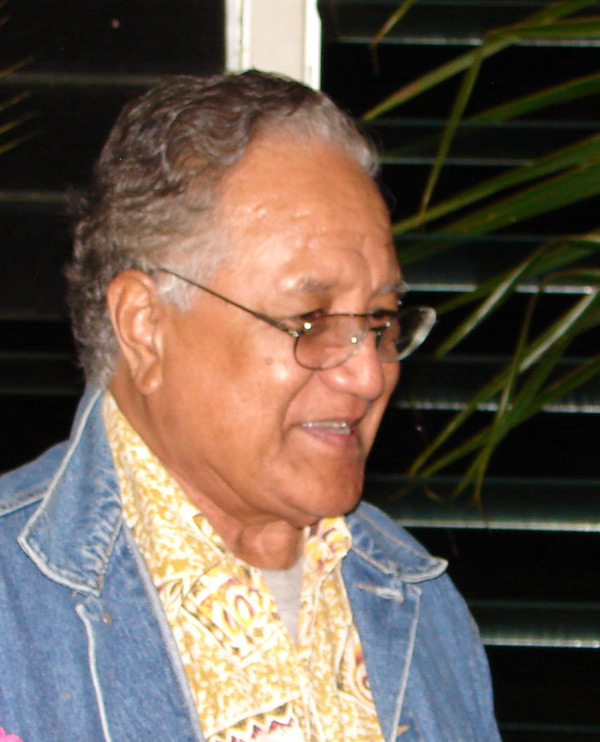
- Vivian at a fiafia in Hakupu, 2006

Premier of Niue
- In office 1 May 2002 – 19 June 2008
- Deputy: Fisa Igilisi Pihigia
- Preceded by: Sani Lakatani
- Succeeded by: Toke Talagi
- In office 12 December 1992 – 9 March 1993
- Preceded by: Sir Robert Rex
- Succeeded by: Frank Lui

Minister of Finance
- In office 1990–1993
- Premier: Robert Rex
- Preceded by: Sani Lakatani
- Succeeded by: Sani Lakatani

Minister of Education, Agriculture, and Economic Development
- In office 1969–1979

Minister of Tourism
- In office 1969–1975
- Succeeded by: Frank Lui

Member of the Niue Parliament for Hakupu
- In office 1969 – 6 May 2017
- Preceded by: Siakisoni
- Succeeded by: Michael Jackson

Personal details
- Born: 12 November 1935 (age 90) Alofi, Niue
- Party: Niue People's Action Party (until 2003); Independent (from 2003)
- Spouse: Vaitofuola (nee Ikiua-Lupo)

Mititaiagimene Young Vivian CNZM NDSC (born 12 November 1935) is a Niuean politician and diplomat, who served as Premier of Niue twice, the first time from December 1992 to March 1993 following the death of Sir Robert Rex, and the second from 2002 to 2008. He also served as a Cabinet Minister multiple times, first as Minister of Education, Economic Development and Agriculture and later as Minister of Finance under Robert Rex, and in the Cabinet of Sani Lakatani. From 1979 to 1982 he served as Secretary-General of the South Pacific Commission.

== Early life ==
Vivian attended primary school on Niue, before going to New Zealand for his secondary education. He was educated at St George's Preparatory School in Wanganui from 1949, and then Wanganui Collegiate School as a boarder between 1951 and 1954. After completing teacher training at Ardmore Teachers' College, Vivian returned to Niue and worked as a teacher for almost 10 years. He then took a course on the teaching of English as a second language at Victoria University of Wellington, and returned again to Niue in 1969.

== Early political career ==
Vivian was first elected to the Niue Assembly in the 1969 general election and appointed to the Executive Council, serving as Member of Education in Robert Rex's pre-independence government. Vivian was re-elected at the 1972 election, and was part of the team which negotiated Niue's independence. He was re-elected at the 1975 election and reappointed Minister for Education, Agriculture, and Economic Development, but lost the Tourism portfolio to Frank Lui.

In 1978, Vivian was elected Secretary-General of the South Pacific Commission, giving up his position as a Minister to take the job. He served in the role from 1979 to 1982, after which he worked as a cultural officer for the Niuean Government. In 1984 he was back in the Legislative Assembly, but was not reappointed to Cabinet. In an early speech, he denounced the decolonisation process as being forced on Niue, and attacked New Zealand for its lack of assistance following independence. In 1985, when Premier Robert Rex talked of retirement, he was seen as a likely successor.

== Leader of the opposition and first Premiership ==
Vivian was re-elected in the 1987 election, and became leader of the new Niue People's Action Party (NPAP). As leader of the opposition, he led a confidence vote against Rex in 1989, which while unsuccessful, saw three government MP's cross the floor. At the 1990 election the NPAP gained 12 of 20 seats, giving it a majority, but a dispute over the leadership between Vivian and newly elected MP Sani Lakatani saw Rex lure a group of MPs led by the latter switch sides, and Rex won the premiership on a 12–8 vote. Less than six months later Lakatani was sacked from Cabinet after attempting to oust Rex, and Vivian was appointed Minister of Finance, Education, and Administration in his place. He later served as acting Premier during Rex's illness, and following his death in December 1992, was elected Premier. He was re-elected to the Assembly at the 1993 election, but lost the Premiership to Frank Lui 11 votes to 9.

== Second opposition period ==
After losing the Premiership, Vivian became leader of the Opposition again. In 1995 he allied with Sani Lakatani, who had once again been dismissed from Cabinet, to effectively deadlock Parliament, preventing any legislation from being passed. An attempt by the government to break the deadlock by declaring the seats of opposition MPs vacant was ultimately declared illegal by the Niue Court of Appeal. The deadlock was finally broken when Vivian agreed that the NPP would support the government's budget in an effort to avoid an early election.

Vivian was re-elected unopposed at the 1996 election, but did not stand for Premier.

== Cabinet and second Premiership ==
The renamed Niue People's Party won a majority at the 1999 election, and Sani Lakatani was elected Premier. Vivian was appointed to Cabinet as Deputy Prime Minister and Minister of Education.

Vivian was returned unopposed at the 2002 election and elected leader of the NPP in place of Lakatani. He was subsequently elected premier, defeating Hunukitama Hunuki by 14 votes to 6. He appointed Lakatani as his Deputy, but fired him just three months later after he voted against the budget. As premier he arranged direct flights to Niue by Polynesian Airlines to boost tourism, negotiated for European Union funding for renewable energy, and negotiated for greater New Zealand assistance. A proposal to allow immigration from Tonga and Samoa if Niueans did not return from New Zealand proved unpopular.

In January 2004 Vivian's wife, Leone Tofuola Vivian, died after a long illness in New Zealand. While Vivian was still in Auckland, Niue was struck by Cyclone Heta which destroyed the capital Alofi and the island's only hospital. The government was heavily criticised over its reconstruction efforts, particularly the distribution of aid and allocation of new houses.

He was again re-elected unopposed in the 2005 election and re-elected Premier, defeating O'Love Jacobsen 17 votes to 3. His 2005 budget cut spending, and in December 2005 a leaked government report revealed that Niue was virtually bankrupt. A further report in 2006 revealed further financial difficulties and that cyclone aid had been used to prop up the government's accounts. New Zealand provided funds for a bailout, but Vivian's government cut public services and imposed user-pays charges to balance the books. Vivian was accused of economic mismanagement, but survived a confidence vote. The financial problems were temporarily solved with $750,000 obtained on an official visit to China. A proposal to introduce a goods and services tax was rejected by the Assembly.

He was again re-elected unopposed to Parliament in the 2008 elections, but lost the Premiership to Toke Talagi, who won fourteen votes to Vivian's five, and one abstaining.

== Later life ==
In the 2017 general election, Vivian lost the Hakupu seat to Michael Jackson. At the 2020 general election, Vivian stood for election to one of the six common roll seats, but was unsuccessful.

In December 2021, Vivian was evacuated by air ambulance from Niue to New Zealand for medical treatment.

== Honours and awards ==
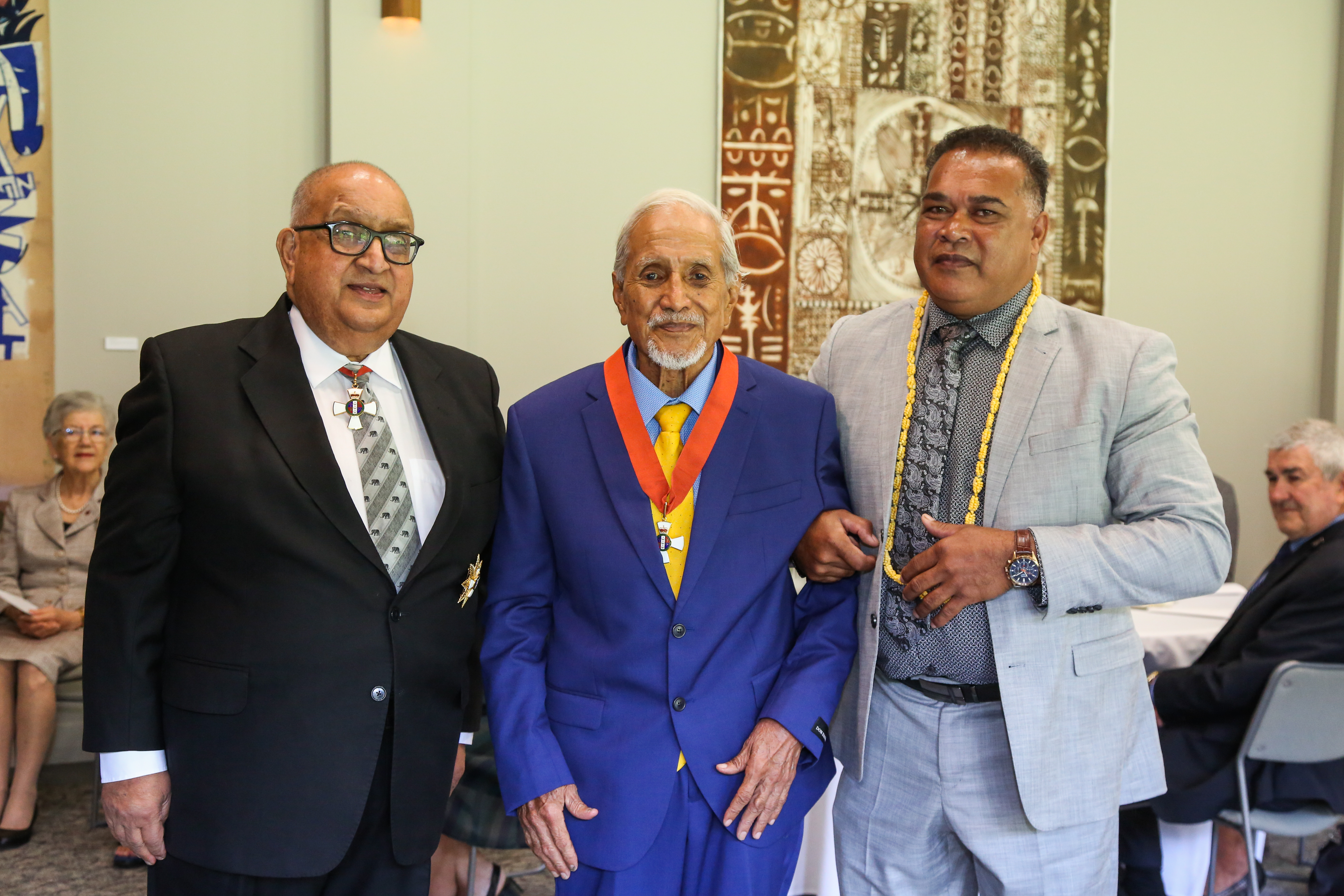
Vivian (centre), after his investiture as a Companion of the New Zealand Order of Merit by the former governor-general, Sir Anand Satyanand (left), at Government House, Auckland, on 13 April 2023

At the inaugural Niue National Awards in 2020, Vivian was awarded the Niue Distinguished Service Cross. He was appointed a Companion of the New Zealand Order of Merit in the 2023 New Year Honours, for services to Niue.

Assembly seats
| Preceded by Siakisoni | Member of the Niuean Parliament for Hakupu; 1969–2017 | Succeeded by Michael Jackson |
Political offices
| Preceded by Sani Lakatani | Minister of Finance; 1990–1993 | Succeeded by Sani Lakatani |
| Preceded by Robert Rex | Premier of Niue; 1992–1993; 2002–2008 | Succeeded by Frank Lui |
| Preceded by Sani Lakatani | Premier of Niue; 1992–1993; 2002–2008 | Succeeded by Toke Talagi |
