= Togia Sioneholo =

Niuean politician

Togia Likalika Sioneholo is a Niuean politician who was a cabinet minister of Toke Talagi's government from June 2008 to May 2011 after being elected to the Niue Assembly in the June 2008 general election. He was minister for community affairs, education, justice, shipping and bulk fuels. He was formerly chief electoral officer.

== Early life ==
Sioneholo is from the village of Mutalau, but now resides in the village of Alofi South. He first graduated from the University of the South Pacific with a bachelor's of arts in history and politics.

He is also a qualified lawyer graduated from the University of Tasmania and did post-graduated studies at the Australian National University.

Previously, Togia was head of the Niue justice department. He is also the secretary and treasurer of the Ekalesia Niue church in Mutalau.

He stood on the common roll in the 2023 Niuean general election, but was unsuccessful.
