= Niue People's Party =

Niuean political party

The Niue People's Party (also known as the Niue People's Action Party) was a political party in Niue. Founded in 1987 by Niueans living in New Zealand, it was disbanded in 2003. It was, during that time, the country's only political party.

The party won four seats at the 1987 Niuean general election.

The Niue People's Party (NPP) first entered parliament in 1996. The party won the elections of 1999 and Sani Lakatani became Premier (Chief Minister). Lakatani was succeeded in 2002 by Mititaiagimene Young Vivian, also a member of the NPP. During the legislative elections held on 21 April 2002, the party won six seats and supported 14 out of the 20 elected members, enabling it to take part in government.

The party dissolved itself in 2003, following internal dissent. Since then, there haven't been any political parties in Niue.

== Officeholders ==
=== List of leaders ===
No.	Name	Term of office	
1	Young Vivian	1987	March 1999
2	Sani Lakatani	March 1999	April 2002
(1)	Young Vivian	April 2002	c. July 2003

=== List of deputy leaders ===
Name	Term of office	
Young Vivian	March 1999	?
