= 1999 Niuean general election =

- 19 March 1999

All 20 seats in the Assembly 11 seats needed for a majority

General elections were held in Niue on 19 March 1999 to determine the composition of the twenty member national Assembly. Fourteen incumbents retained their seats, with Premier Frank Lui a notable exception. Following the election, the Niue People's Party was able to form a government, and its leader Sani Lakatani was elected premier, defeating O'Love Jacobsen 14–6. Former Assembly member Tama Posimani was elected Speaker by an identical margin.
