= Hima Douglas =

Niuean politician and diplomat

Speaker of the Niue Assembly
- In office 11 June 2020 – 13 May 2026
- Preceded by: Togiavalu Pihigia
- Succeeded by: Billy Talagi

1st High Commissioner of Niue to New Zealand
- In office 2001–2004
- Preceded by: Office established
- Succeeded by: Sisilia Talagi

Member of the Niue Assembly
- In office 1999–2001
- In office 2005–2008
- Succeeded by: Togia Sioneholo

Hima Ikimotu Douglas or Hima Takelesi is a Niuean broadcaster, diplomat, and politician who served as the Speaker of the Niue Assembly from 2020 to 2026. Douglas was High Commissioner of Niue to New Zealand from 2001 to 2004.

== Early life and education ==
Hima Ikimotu Douglas graduated from a university in New Zealand with a degree in accounting and was only a few flying hours away from receiving a pilot's license. He was the owner of Matavai Resort, the only hotel in Niue.

== Career ==
The government of Niue first employed Douglas in 1968, and was appointed assistant treasurer in the Treasury Department in 1975. He contributed to Tohi Tala Niue, a weekly newsletter, in the 1970s. Douglas worked as a radio broadcaster and led the Broadcasting Corporation of Niue. In 1975, he joined the South Pacific Commission as an Educational Broadcasts Officer and was based in Suva. He was the director of the University of the South Pacific's branch in Niue.

In the 1999 election Douglas was elected to the Niue Assembly. He resigned from the assembly in order to become High Commissioner of Niue to New Zealand, which he served as from 2001 to 2004. After Cyclone Heta damaged Niue, Douglas called for the 20,000 Niueans in New Zealand to return to Niue to help rebuild and noted that they could still receive their pensions if they moved.

Douglas returned to the assembly in the 2005 election, but lost reelection to the assembly to Togia Sioneholo in 2008. During Douglas' tenure in the assembly he served as chair of the Public Accounts committee. In 2020, he became speaker of the assembly after defeating incumbent Togiavalu Pihigia by a vote of 11 to 9 in the third round of voting. He was nominated unopposed to retain the speakership in 2023 following elections. Following the 2024 referendum, he would sign two amendments renaming the Premier to Prime Minister and the Audit Office to the Auditor General into law. He would remark that the approval of the Auditor-General amendment would assist in helping parliamentary committees focus attention on dealing with domestic issues. In 2026, Douglas confirmed that he will leave politics following the 2026 elections, retiring after a six-year tenure of modernising parliamentary processes.

== Works cited ==
=== News ===
- "Dalton Tagelagi voted in as new Premier of Niue". Radio New Zealand. 11 June 2020. Archived from the original on 26 June 2025.
- "New Educational Broadcasts Officer Appointed to SPC". South Pacific Bulletin. 1975.
- "New Niue Speaker wants to reestablish neutrality of position". Radio New Zealand. 16 June 2020. Archived from the original on 22 June 2021.
- "Surprise changes in Niue's elections". Radio New Zealand. 9 June 2008. Archived from the original on 26 June 2025.
- Gregory, Angela (2 June 2004). "Island people urged to return to Niue". The New Zealand Herald. Archived from the original on 26 June 2025.

=== Web ===
- "About Us". Talaniue. Archived from the original on 22 August 2020.
- "CPA Small Branches Workshop C: Balancing Tradition and Innovation: Modernising the Westminster System in Small Jurisdictions". Commonwealth Parliamentary Association. Archived from the original on 28 June 2020.
- "High Commissioner Hima Douglas Takelesi Leaves for New Zealand". Pacific Island Report. 14 February 2001. Archived from the original on 11 June 2020.
- "Niue Premier Frank Lui Loses Assembly Seat". Pacific Island Report. 22 March 1999. Archived from the original on 28 June 2020.
