= Prime Minister of Niue =

Head of government

- Coat of arms of Niue

- Flag of Niue

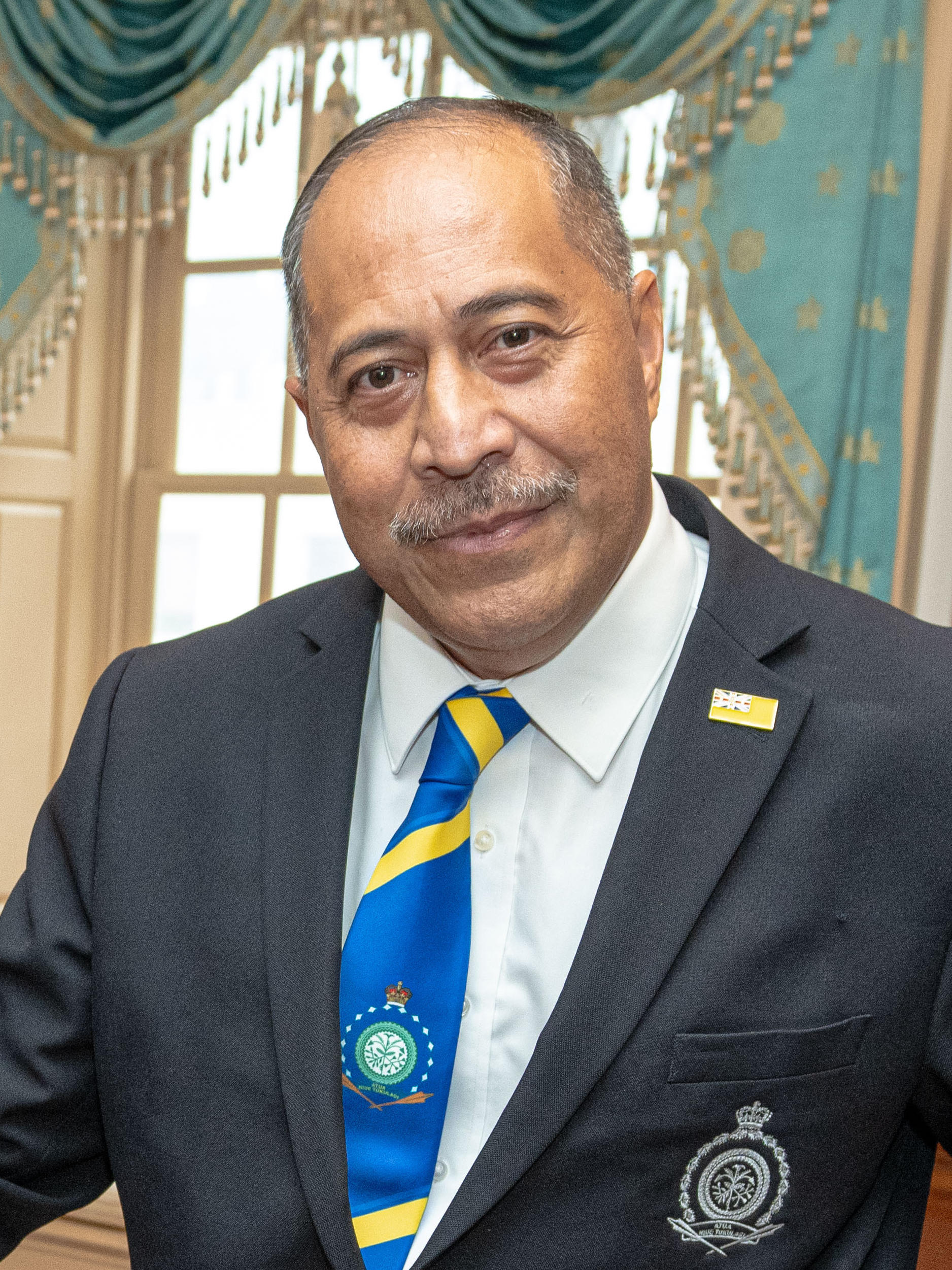
- Incumbent; Dalton Tagelagi since 11 June 2020
- Type: Head of government
- Member of: Cabinet of Niue, Assembly
- Seat: Alofi
- Appointer: King's Representative to Niue
- Term length: At His Majesty's pleasure
- Constituting instrument: Niue Constitution Act
- Precursor: Leader of Government Business
- Formation: 19 October 1974
- First holder: Sir Robert Rex
- Deputy: Member Assisting the Prime Minister

The prime minister of Niue (officially the premier of Niue prior to 3 September 2024) (Note: The prime minister is still referred to as the premier in most governmental pages and entities, and retains the title as an alternate, transitional, or quasi-official name despite the recent referendum.) is Niue's head of government. They are elected by the Niue Assembly, and form a Cabinet consisting of themselves and three other members of the Assembly.

Sir Robert Rex was continuously re-elected every three years from Niue's associated statehood in 1974 until his death in 1992.

== List of officeholders ==
Political parties and other affiliations

Niue People's Party
Independent

No.	Portrait	Name (Birth–Death)	Term of office			Political party	Elected	Cabinet(s)	Ref.
No.	Portrait	Name (Birth–Death)	Took office	Left office	Time in office	Political party	Elected	Cabinet(s)	Ref.
1		Sir Robert Rex (1909–1992)	19 October 1974	12 December 1992 #	18 years, 54 days	Independent (1974–1987)	1975	Rex	
1		Sir Robert Rex (1909–1992)	19 October 1974	12 December 1992 #	18 years, 54 days	Independent (1974–1987)	1978	Rex	
1		Sir Robert Rex (1909–1992)	19 October 1974	12 December 1992 #	18 years, 54 days	Independent (1974–1987)	1981	Rex	
1		Sir Robert Rex (1909–1992)	19 October 1974	12 December 1992 #	18 years, 54 days	Independent (1974–1987)	1984	Rex	
1		Sir Robert Rex (1909–1992)	19 October 1974	12 December 1992 #	18 years, 54 days	Niue People's Party (1987–1992)	1987	Rex	
1		Sir Robert Rex (1909–1992)	19 October 1974	12 December 1992 #	18 years, 54 days	Niue People's Party (1987–1992)	1990	Rex	
2		Young Vivian (born 1935)	12 December 1992	9 March 1993	87 days	Niue People's Party	–	Vivian I	
3		Frank Lui (1935–2021)	9 March 1993	26 March 1999	6 years, 17 days	Independent	1993	Lui	
3		Frank Lui (1935–2021)	9 March 1993	26 March 1999	6 years, 17 days	Independent	1996	Lui	
4		Sani Lakatani (1936–2026)	26 March 1999	1 May 2002	3 years, 36 days	Niue People's Party	1999	Lakatani	
(2)		Young Vivian (born 1935)	1 May 2002	19 June 2008	6 years, 49 days	Niue People's Party (2002–2003)	2002	Vivian II	
(2)		Young Vivian (born 1935)	1 May 2002	19 June 2008	6 years, 49 days	Independent (2003–2008)	2005	Vivian III	
5		Sir Toke Talagi (1951–2020)	19 June 2008	11 June 2020	11 years, 358 days	Independent	2008	Talagi I	
5		Sir Toke Talagi (1951–2020)	19 June 2008	11 June 2020	11 years, 358 days	Independent	2011	Talagi II	
5		Sir Toke Talagi (1951–2020)	19 June 2008	11 June 2020	11 years, 358 days	Independent	2014	Talagi III	
5		Sir Toke Talagi (1951–2020)	19 June 2008	11 June 2020	11 years, 358 days	Independent	2017	Talagi IV	
6		Dalton Tagelagi (born 1968)	11 June 2020	Incumbent	6 years, 88 days	Independent	2020	Tagelagi I	
6		Dalton Tagelagi (born 1968)	11 June 2020	Incumbent	6 years, 88 days	Independent	2023	Tagelagi II	
6		Dalton Tagelagi (born 1968)	11 June 2020	Incumbent	6 years, 88 days	Independent	2026	Tagelagi III	

== Timeline ==
This is a graphical lifespan timeline of the prime ministers of Niue. They are listed in order of first assuming office.

The following chart lists prime ministers by lifespan (living prime ministers on the green line), with the years outside of their tenure in beige.

== See also ==
- Politics of Niue
- Patu-iki
- List of Niuean monarchs
- List of resident commissioners of Niue
