= Robert Rex =

Premier of Niue from 1974 to 1992

The Honourable Sir Robert Rex KBE CMG

1st Premier of Niue
- In office 19 October 1974 – 12 December 1992
- Governor-General: Dennis Blundell; Keith Holyoake; David Beattie; Paul Reeves
- Preceded by: Office established
- Succeeded by: Young Vivian (Interim)
- Constituency: Alofi South

Personal details
- Born: 25 January 1909 Anafonua, Avatele, Niue
- Died: 12 December 1992 (aged 83) Halamahaga, Alofi South, Niue
- Party: Niue People's Action Party
- Spouse: Tuagatagaloa Patricia, Lady Rex

Sir Robert Richmond Rex KBE CMG (25 January 1909 – 12 December 1992) was the first Premier of the Pacific island state of Niue.

== Early life and family ==
Rex was born in Alofi on 25 January 1909 to parents Leslie Lucas Richmond Rex, a European trader on Niue, and Fisimonomono Tufaina of Avatele Village in the south of Niue. He later settled down in Alofi, the capital of Niue, with his wife of that village, Patricia Rex, QSM (1918–2004).

Rex was the great-uncle of the rugby player Frank Bunce.

== Political career ==
Rex was Premier of Niue from its establishment as a self-governing territory on 19 October 1974 until his death in 1992. Upon his death in office, he was succeeded by Mititaiagimene Young Vivian, until General Elections the following year resulted in the election of Frank Fakaotimanava Lui into office. Having served 18 years in office, he is Niue's longest serving Premier.

Although Rex was opposed to party politics on Niue, he was supported by the Niue People's Action Party after its formation in 1987. During his almost two decades in office, Rex held virtually all Government ministerial portfolios from time to time. His Cabinet of Ministers included prominent Niuean figures such as Dr Enetama Lipitoa, Mititaiagimene Young Vivian and Frank Fakaotimanava Lui, the latter two also going on to become Premiers of Niue.

== Honours ==
In the 1973 New Year Honours, Rex was made an Officer of the Order of the British Empire, for valuable services to the people of Niue. He was appointed a Companion of the Order of St Michael and St George in the 1977 Queen's Silver Jubilee and Birthday Honours.

Rex was the first Niuean to receive a knighthood, being appointed a Knight Commander of the Order of the British Empire in the 1984 New Year Honours.

Government offices
New office	Premier of Niue; 1974–1992	Succeeded by Young Vivian
