= History of Niue =

The history of Niue is the history of the area and people of Niue, including its indigenous Polynesian societies. Niue was first settled by Polynesian sailors from Samoa in around 900 AD. Further settlers (or possibly invaders) arrived from Tonga in the 16th century.

The first known sighting of the island by a European was by Captain James Cook in 1774 during his second Pacific voyage. The pioneering missionary John Williams was the first European to land on the island in 1830. After years of British missionary activity, negotiations with the local kings for British protection of the island began in 1879. Lord Ranfurly, Governor of New Zealand proclaimed British Sovereignty over Niue in 1900, therefore laid the island under the patronage of New Zealand.

Niue lost around 4% of its population in World War I as 150 Niuean men were sent to France under the New Zealand army, of which nearly none returned. World War II however did not directly affect the island.

Niue became self-governing in 1974. Since then, the island has been shrinking in population from emigration due to frequent devastating natural disasters and lack of economic opportunities.

== Early history ==
Until the beginning of the 18th century, there appears to have been no national government or national leader in Niue. Before that time, chiefs and heads of family exercised authority over segments of the population. Around 1700, the concept and practice of kingship appears to have been introduced through contact with Samoa or Tonga. From then on, a succession of patu-iki (kings) ruled the island, the first of whom was Puni-mata.

== European contact ==
Captain James Cook was the first European to sight the island, but he was unable to land there due to fierce opposition by the local population. The 1911 Encyclopædia Britannica claimed this was due to native fear of foreign disease. In response, Cook named Niue the Savage Island.

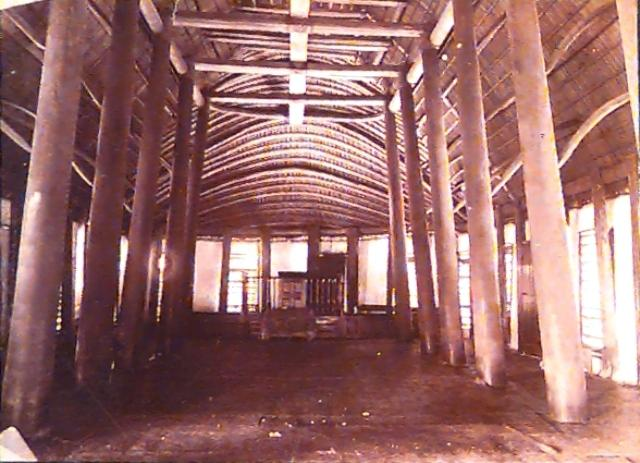
Photo by Thomas Andrew of the interior of church building in Alofi, 1896.

Christian missionaries from the London Missionary Society converted most of the population circa 1846. Tui-toga, who reigned from 1875 to 1887, was the first Christian king of Niue.

The island was visited by Captain John Erskine in H.M.S. Havannah in July 1849.

== British protectorate ==
In 1887, King Fataaiki wrote to Queen Victoria of the United Kingdom, requesting that Niue be placed under British protection, but his request was turned down. In 1900, in response to renewed requests, the island became a British protectorate, and the following year it was annexed by New Zealand. Niue's remoteness, as well as cultural and linguistic differences between its Polynesian inhabitants and those of the Cook Islands, caused it to be separately administered.

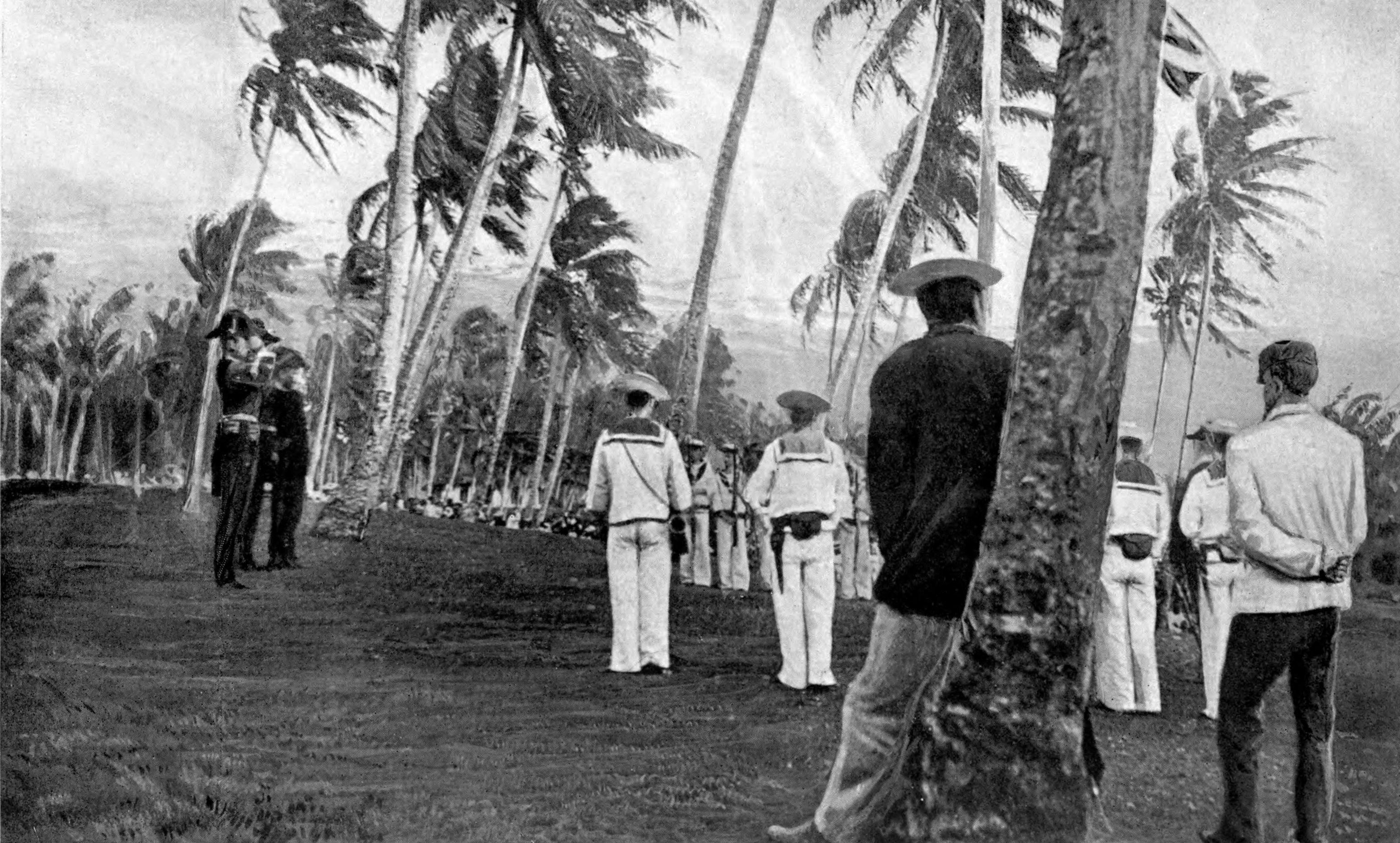
Hoisting the Union Jack flag over Niue, 1900

== World War I ==
During World War I, 148 Niuean men (4% of the island's population) served as soldiers in the New Zealand armed forces. They were initially sent to Egypt, in February 1916, however, illness was common, and by April over half of them had been hospitalized. They were transferred to Northern France in April 1916, where illness was also common. At the end of May it was decided the Niuean soldiers would be withdrawn from the front, being sent to Hornchurch, in England, before leaving for New Zealand by the end of June.

== Autonomy ==
Niue gained its autonomy in 1974 in free association with New Zealand, which handles the island's military and foreign affairs. Niue had been offered autonomy in 1965 (along with the Cook Islands, which accepted), but had asked for its autonomy to be deferred another decade.

Niueans continue to be New Zealand citizens, and use standard New Zealand passports. Niueans who meet normal residence criteria in either country may vote or stand in that country's elections. Niue continues to use New Zealand currency, but issues its own postage stamps (New Zealand stamps are not valid for postage in Niue, nor Niuean stamps in New Zealand).

== Recent history ==
In January 2004, Niue was struck by a devastating cyclone (Cyclone Heta) which left 200 of the islands' 1600 inhabitants homeless. As a number of local residents chose afterwards not to rebuild, New Zealand's Foreign Affairs Minister Phil Goff speculated that Niue's status as a self-governing nation in free association with New Zealand might come into question if too many residents departed the island to maintain basic services. Soon afterwards, Niue Premier Young Vivian categorically rejected the possibility of altering the existing relationship with New Zealand.

The population of the island continues to drop (from a peak of 5,200 in 1966 to 2,100 in 2000), with substantial emigration to New Zealand.

== See also ==
- Postage stamps and postal history of Niue
- List of resident commissioners of Niue
