= List of speakers of the Niue Assembly =

Speaker of the Niue Assembly
- Flag of Niue

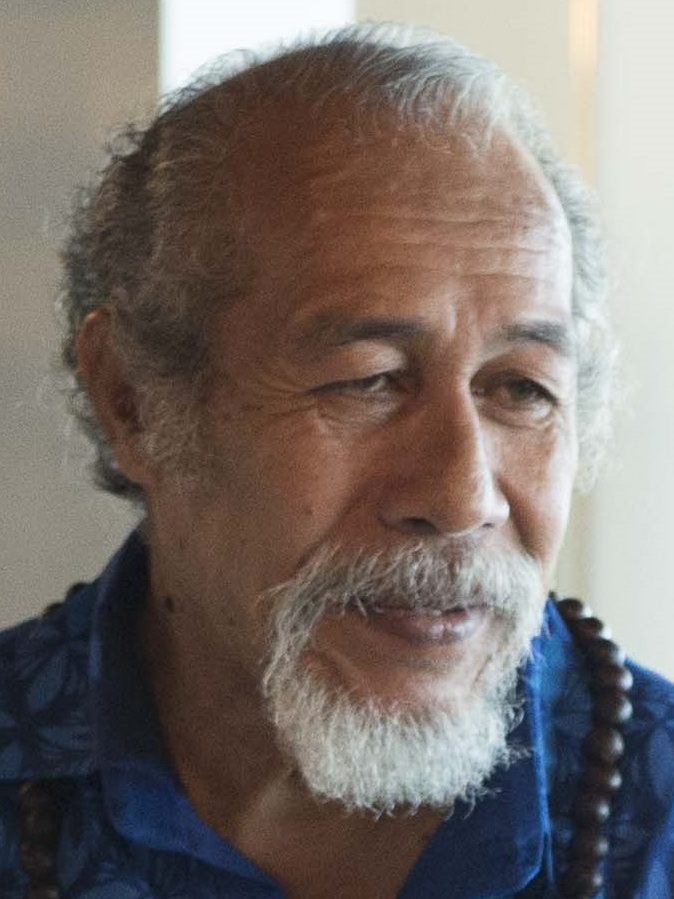
- Incumbent; Billy Talagi since 13 May 2026
- Appointer: Niue Assembly
- Inaugural holder: Sam Pata Emani Tagelagi
- Formation: 1976

The Speaker of the Niue Assembly is the presiding officer of the Legislative Assembly of Niue.

As of 13 May 2026, the speaker is Billy Talagi.

== List of speakers ==
This is a list of speakers of the Niue Assembly:

Name	Entered office	Left office
Hon. Sam Pata Emani Tagelagi	1976	1993
Hon. John Tofo Funaki	1993	1999
Hon. Tama Lati Posimani	1999	1 May 2002
Hon. Atapana Siakimotu	1 May 2002	2011
Hon. Ahohiva Levi	17 May 2011	11 April 2014
Hon. Togiavalu Pihigia	12 April 2014	10 June 2020
Hon. Hima Douglas	11 June 2020	12 May 2026
Hon. Billy Talagi	13 May 2026	Incumbent
