= Niue Assembly =

Legislature of Niue

Niue Assembly Niue Fono Ekepule
- Coat of arms of Niue

Type
- Type: Unicameral

Leadership
- Speaker: Billy Talagi since 13 May 2026

Structure
- Seats: 20
- Political groups: Common roll (6); Village representatives (14)

Elections
- Last election: 2 May 2026
- Next election: 2029

Meeting place
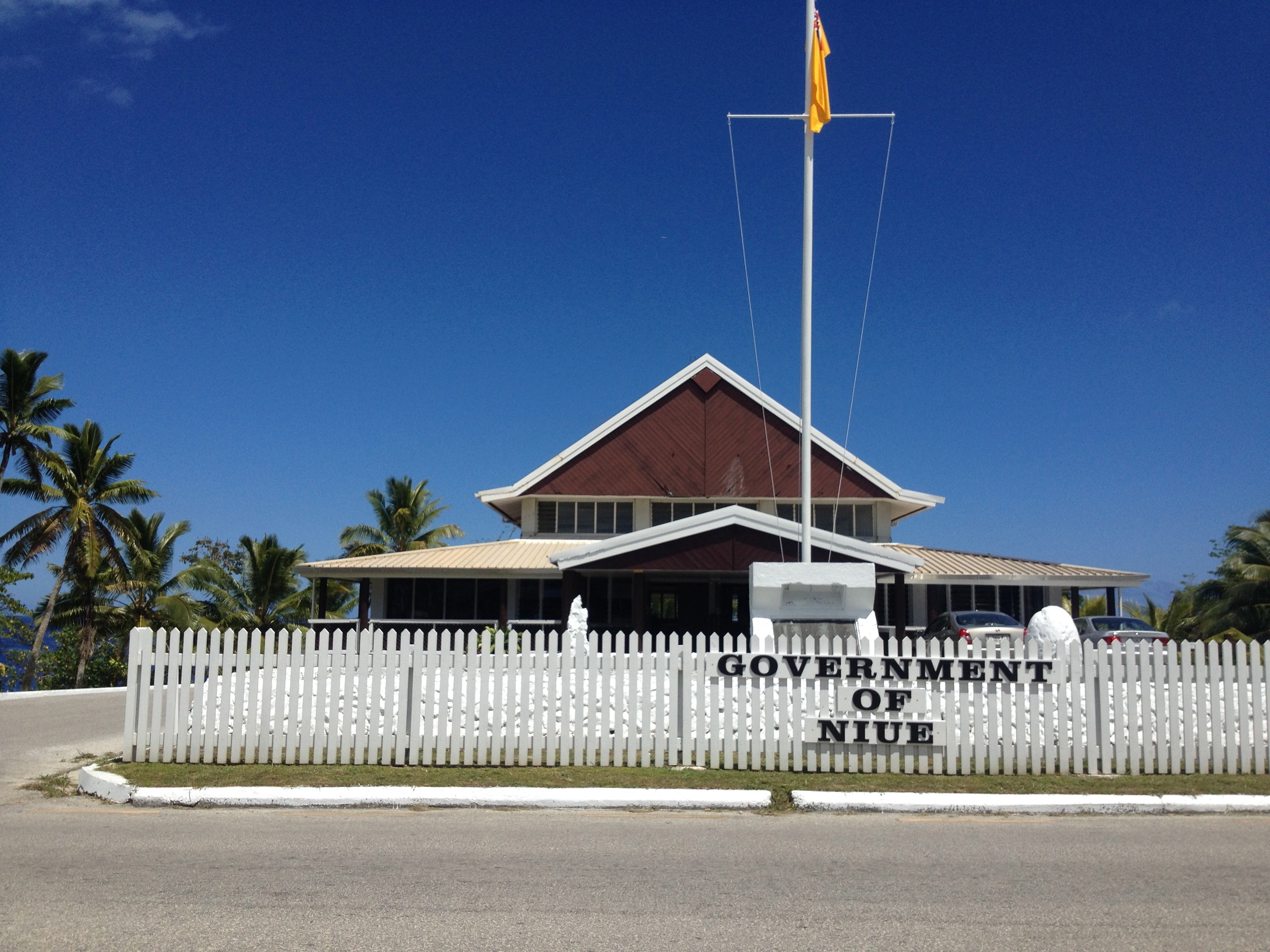
- Alofi

Website
- www.gov.nu/parliament

The Niue Assembly or Niue Parliament (Niuean: Niue Fono Ekepule) is the legislature of Niue. It consists of 20 members; 14 representatives of the villages and 6 elected on a common island-wide roll. Members are directly elected by universal suffrage, and serve a three-year term. Niue follows the Westminster system of government, with the prime minister elected by the Assembly and the Cabinet drawn from it.

== History ==
The Assembly is descended from the Island Council established under the Cook Islands Act 1915. This was disbanded in 1959 and reconstituted as the Assembly, which was successively granted greater control. The Assembly assumed full law-making power within the constitution upon self-government in 1974.

The Assembly is physically located in Alofi.

== Speaker of the Assembly ==
The Assembly is presided over by a Speaker, elected by its members from outside their ranks. If a member of the Assembly is elected Speaker, they must resign their seat. A majority of 11 is required to elect a speaker. The Speaker does not vote in proceedings, and does not enjoy a casting vote.

The current speaker as of 2026 is Billy Talagi.

== Elections ==
Elections are held under a simple plurality system, with electors in the fourteen villages electing one member per village by majority vote, and six members from a common roll. Electors and candidates must be either New Zealand citizens or permanent residents of Niue, continually resident for at least three years at some point, and ordinarily resident for twelve months prior to enrolment as an elector or, as the case may be, nomination as a candidate.

== Terms of the Niue Assembly ==
Term	Elected in	Government
13th Assembly	2008 election	Non-partisan
14th Assembly	2011 election	Non-partisan
15th Assembly	2014 election	
16th Assembly	2017 election	
17th Assembly	2020 election	
18th Assembly	2023 election	
19th Assembly	2026 election	

== Legislative procedures ==
The power of the Assembly to pass legislation is circumscribed by the constitution. Any member may introduce a bill, but the Assembly may not proceed on bills dealing with financial matters without the consent of the Prime Minister. Bills affecting the criminal law or personal status, the public service or Niuean land may not proceed without a report from the Chief Justice, the Niue Public Service Commission, or an appropriate Commission of Inquiry respectively.

A bill becomes law when passed by the Assembly and certified by the Speaker. There is no Royal Assent.

== See also ==
- List of speakers of the Niue Assembly
