= Outline of Niue =

Overview of and topical guide to Niue

The Flag of Niue

The coat of arms of Niue

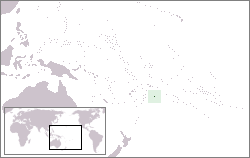
The location of Niue

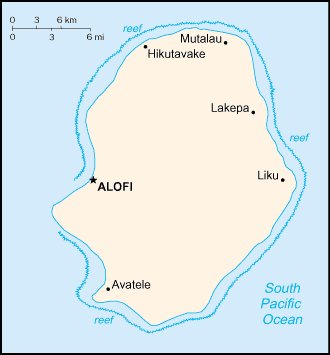
An enlargeable map of Niue

The following outline is provided as an overview of and topical guide to Niue:

Niue – an island nation in free association with New Zealand located in the South Pacific Ocean. It is commonly known as the "Rock of Polynesia". Natives of the island call it merely "The Rock". Although self-governing, Niue is in free association with New Zealand, meaning that the Sovereign in Right of New Zealand is also Niue's head of state. Most diplomatic relations are conducted by New Zealand on Niue's behalf. Niue is located 2,400 kilometres northeast of New Zealand in a triangle between Tonga, Samoa, and the Cook Islands. The Niuean language and the English language are both taught in schools and used in day-to-day business and communications. The people are predominantly Polynesian.

== General reference ==
- Pronunciation:
- Common English country name: Niue
- Official English country name: Niue
- Common endonym(s): List of countries and capitals in native languages
- Official endonym(s): List of official endonyms of present-day nations and states
- Adjectival(s): Niuean
- Demonym(s):
- Etymology: Name of Niue
- ISO country codes: NU, NIU, 570
- ISO region codes: See ISO 3166-2:NU
- Internet country code top-level domain: .nu

== Geography of Niue ==
Geography of Niue

- Niue is: An island country.
- Location:
  - Western Hemisphere and Southern Hemisphere
  - Pacific Ocean
    - South Pacific Ocean
      - Oceania
        - Polynesia
  - Time zone: UTC-11
  - Extreme points of Niue
    - High: unnamed location near Mutalau settlement 68 m (223 ft)
    - Low: South Pacific Ocean 0 m
  - Land boundaries: none
  - Coastline: South Pacific Ocean 64 km
- Population of Niue: 1,600 - 218th most populous country
- Area of Niue: 260 km^{2}
- Atlas of Niue

=== Environment of Niue ===
- Climate of Niue
- Renewable energy in Niue
- Wildlife of Niue
  - Fauna of Niue
    - Birds of Niue
    - Butterflies of Niue
    - Mammals of Niue

==== Natural geographic features of Niue ====
- Islands of Niue
- Rivers of Niue
- Valleys of Niue
- World Heritage Sites in Niue: None

=== Regions of Niue ===
Regions of Niue

==== Ecoregions of Niue ====
List of ecoregions in Niue

- Tongan tropical moist forests

==== Administrative divisions of Niue ====
None

===== Municipalities of Niue =====
- Capital of Niue: Alofi
- Cities of Niue

=== Demography of Niue ===
Demographics of Niue

== Government and politics of Niue ==
Politics of Niue

- Form of government:
- Capital of Niue: Alofi
- Elections in Niue
- Political parties in Niue

=== Branches of the government of Niue ===
Government of Niue

==== Executive branch of the government of Niue ====
- Head of state: King of New Zealand, Charles III
  - Governor-General of New Zealand, Dame Cindy Kiro
- Head of government: Premier of Niue, Dalton Tagelagi
- Cabinet of Niue

==== Legislative branch of the government of Niue ====
- Parliament of Niue (unicameral)

==== Judicial branch of the government of Niue ====
Court system of Niue

=== Foreign relations of Niue ===
Foreign relations of Niue

- Diplomatic missions in Niue
- Diplomatic missions of Niue

==== International organization membership ====
Niue is a member of:

- African, Caribbean, and Pacific Group of States (ACP)
- Food and Agriculture Organization (FAO)
- International Fund for Agricultural Development (IFAD)
- Organisation for the Prohibition of Chemical Weapons (OPCW)
- Pacific Islands Forum (PIF)
- Secretariat of the Pacific Community (SPC)
- South Pacific Regional Trade and Economic Cooperation Agreement (Sparteca)
- United Nations Educational, Scientific, and Cultural Organization (UNESCO)
- Universal Postal Union (UPU)
- World Health Organization (WHO)
- World Meteorological Organization (WMO)

=== Law and order in Niue ===
Law of Niue

- Constitution of Niue
- Human rights in Niue
  - LGBT rights in Niue

=== Military of Niue ===
- Command
  - Commander-in-chief:
- Forces

=== Local government in Niue ===
Local government in Niue

== History of Niue ==
History of Niue

- Niue in World War I

== Culture of Niue ==
Culture of Niue

- Cuisine of Niue
- Festivals in Niue
- Languages of Niue: Niuean language, English language
- Mass media in Niue
- National symbols of Niue
  - Flag of Niue
  - National anthem of Niue: Ko e Iki he Lagi
  - Seal of Niue
- People of Niue
  - Women in Niue
- Public holidays in Niue
- Religion in Niue
  - Sikhism in Niue
- World Heritage Sites: None

=== Art in Niue ===
- Literature of Niue
- Music of Niue

=== Sport in Niue ===
Sport in Niue

- Rugby union in Niue
- Soccer (football) in Niue
- Niue at the Olympics

== Economy and infrastructure of Niue ==
Economy of Niue

- Economic rank, by nominal GDP (2007): 190th (one hundred and ninetieth)
- Agriculture in Niue
- Communications in Niue
  - Internet in Niue
- Companies of Niue
- Currency of Niue: Dollar
  - ISO 4217: NZD
- Tourism in Niue
- Transport in Niue

== Education in Niue ==
Education in Niue

== Infrastructure of Niue ==
- Transportation in Niue
  - Niue International Airport

== See also ==
Niue

- List of resident commissioners of Niue
- List of international rankings
- Niuean language
- Outline of geography
- Outline of New Zealand
- Outline of Oceania
