= Coronations in Oceania =

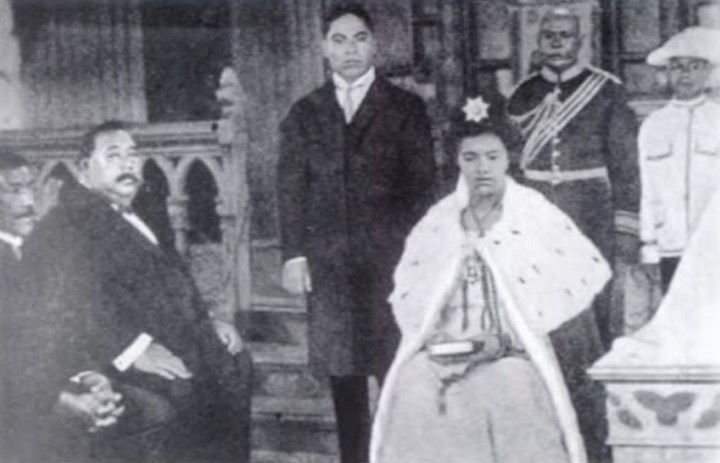
European-style coronation of Queen Sālote Tupou III, 11 October 1918.

Coronations in Oceania are, or were, held in the following countries:

== By country ==
=== Fiji ===
Bau island chief Seru Epenisa Cakobau used Western cannons and muskets to subdue most of Fiji. He was crowned as Fiji's sovereign by European traders and residents, who desired a stable government in Fiji in order to safeguard their investments. Cakobau was crowned in May 1867 as King of Bau, and recognized as King of Fiji in 1871. Later, sovereign authority over Fiji passed to the British crown, until Fiji regained its independence in 1970. Fiji is now a republic, though it recognizes Charles III as Paramount Chief.

=== Hawaii ===
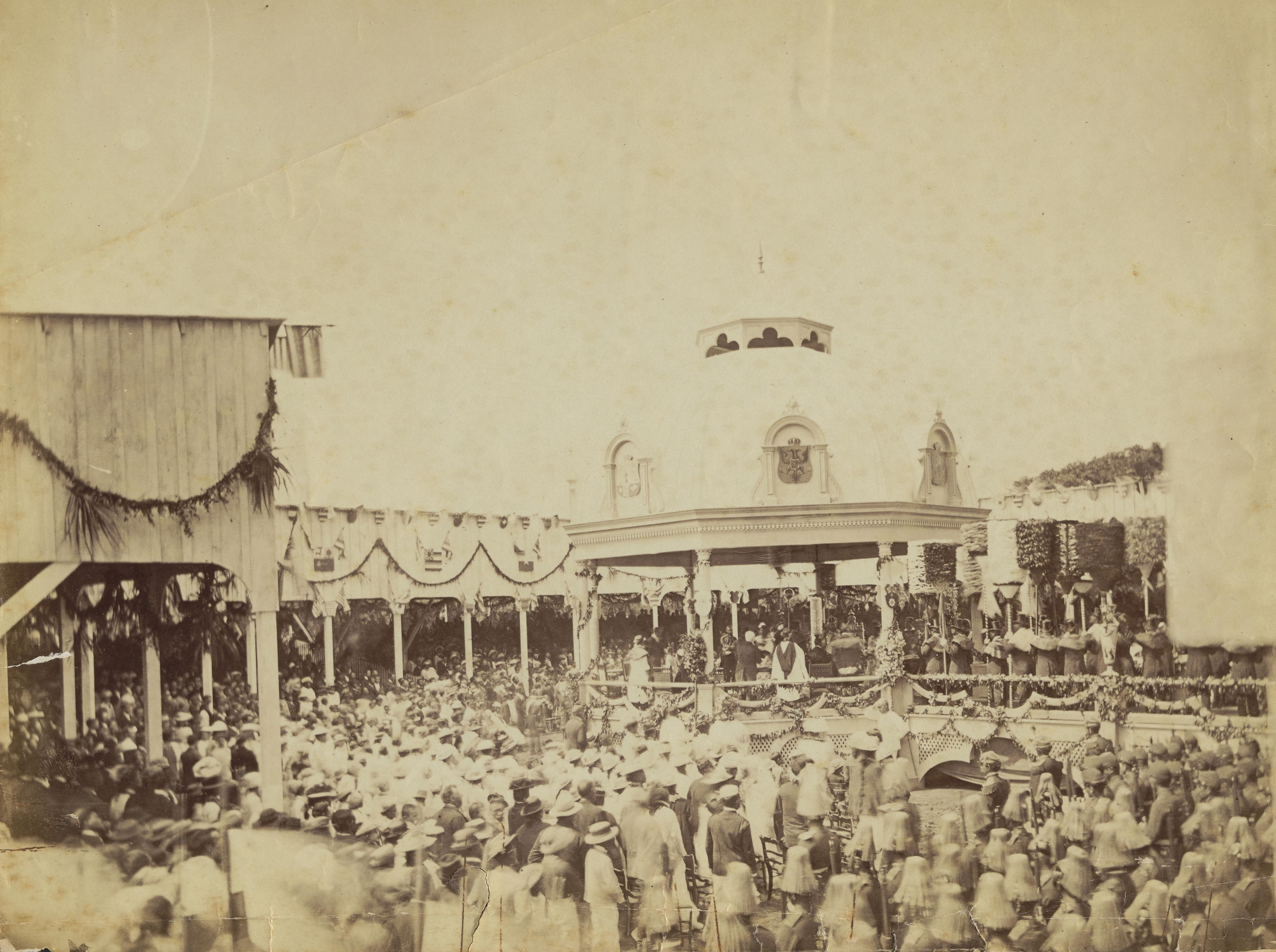
Coronation of King Kalākaua and Queen Kapiʻolani of Hawaii.

The Kingdom of Hawaii held a coronation ritual for King Kalākaua and Queen Kapiʻolani on February 12, 1883, nine years after his accession. Kalākaua's accession in 1874 saw no ceremony due to the political unrest at the time and his unpopularity with the Emmaites, supporters of Queen Emma. He was speedily sworn in as monarch at Kīnaʻu Hale, the chamberlain's quarter next to the Iolani Palace. Prior to this, the three previous monarchs were inaugurated at Kawaiahaʻo Church, where the feather cloak of Kamehameha was placed upon their shoulder.

Two golden crowns were manufactured in England for Kalākaua's subsequent crowning ceremony, and a large pavilion was erected in front of the newly completed ʻIolani Palace, into which the royals proceeded accompanied by bearers carrying the kahili, the ancient symbols of Hawaiian royalty. Given the diadem by a Reverend McIntosh, Kalākaua crowned himself, since no one was deemed sacred enough to crown an aliʻi. He then crowned his queen. When the crown was unable to sit on Kapiʻolan's elaborate hair, it was forced on, bringing the queen to tears. Kalākaua's sister Liliʻuokalani reported that at the moment of his crowning, the sun was obscured by a cloud which gave way to reveal a single bright star. Since this incident occurred during daylight, it caused a sensation among the assembled witnesses.

Liliʻuokalani, who succeeded Kalākaua in 1891, did not have a coronation prior to her overthrow in 1893 and the abolition of the Hawaiian monarchy.

=== Niue ===
Unlike the other islands of Polynesia, Niue had no nationally organized government or single ruling chief until the beginning of the 18th century. Before then, chiefs and heads of families exercised authority over different segments of the population. Around 1700 the concept of kingship appear to have been introduced through contact with Samoa or Tonga, and from then a succession of patu-iki (kings) ruled the island, the first of whom was Puni-mata who bathed in Papatea, near Hakupu. The island was ceded to the British Crown by the eighth Patu-iki, Togia-Pulu-toaki in 1900.

Niue's kingship system was non-hereditary, leaders being elected by the population from among the heads of influential families. Following their election they were ceremonially anointed using traditional rituals, rather than European-style coronations. The new king was required to bathe or ceremonially cleanse himself by washing his body with scented (manogi) oils. A senior chief would then anoint (fakauku) the new ruler by dipping a lau-mamālu leaf in a cup of coconut oil, then striking the king's head three times. Songs (lologo) were composed and sung at the feast (katoaga) held to honor the king after his anointment; many examples survive through oral traditions to this today.

Each village would send representatives to attend the ceremony; others performed various services, such as providing the stone against which the king sat to be anointed, called a pepe. Two stones are in the village of Alofi where Tui-toga and Fata-a-iki were anointed. They are rough flat coral rocks, about four feet high and two feet wide. One other pillar-like stone lies at Tuapa; it was twelve feet high, sixty feet long, and fifty feet wide, although history does not record which kings were anointed there. Seventy or eighty yards away were stone seats reserved for the council of chiefs. Only the last three Niuean monarchs' anointment were recorded by Westerners: Tui-toga, the first Christian king, was anointed on March 2, 1875, Fata-a-iki was anointed on November 21, 1888, and Togia-Pulu-toaki, the last king, was anointed on June 30, 1898.

=== Rarotonga ===
The Kingdom of Rarotonga in reality had many Arikis or kings ruling at once. The Ariki of Rarotonga was ceremonially anointed upon pillar stones similar to the Niuean kings, although their traditions were much older. In Arai Te Tonga, a marae, the spiritual center of the island, the pillar called Tau-Makeva was the location of many anointments in the island's history.

=== Samoa ===
Chiefs of Samoa were anointed in traditional ceremonies. Malietoa Talavou Tonumaipe’a was anointed at Mulinuʻu, the royal seat, on May 24, 1879. Malietoa Laupepa was anointed on March 19, 1880, according to the Samoan custom, and installed at Mulinuʻu. Malietoa Mataafa was anointed on September 9, 1888, at Faleula, Upolu. The Malietoas were recognized as Kings of Samoa by the Europeans during the 19th centuries even though they were not the only chiefs of the island.

=== Tahiti ===
Crown of Tahiti. The crown was a gift from the London Missionary Society to King Pōmare III for his coronation in 1824. The original is housed in the Museum of Tahiti and the Islands in Punaauia.

Tahiti was ruled by native kings (and one queen) of the Pōmare dynasty from 1788 to 1880, when the last monarch, Pōmare V, ceded his country to France. Details from the coronation ritual of Pōmare II, second King of Tahiti (1791), have been preserved. The rite centered upon the maro ura, a sacred girdle symbolizing Pōmare's status and power, composed of yellow and red feathers, five yards long by fifteen inches wide. Black feathers bordered the garment's top and bottom. This robe also contained the auburn hair of Richard Skinner, one of the mutineers from the H.M.S. Bounty who had elected to stay in Tahiti when Fletcher Christian set out for Pitcairn Island. As the ship's barber, Skinner commanded special prestige among Tahitians, who valued his red hair and wove some of it into their maro ura. Also incorporated into the girdle was a red British pennant, which Samuel Wallis of the H.M.S. Dolphin had raised on Tahiti when he took possession of it for the British crown in 1767. The Tahitians had torn down this flag, and woven it into their royal robe as a symbol of their own sovereignty over their island.

To receive this cloak, Pōmare went to his sacred marae, donned the cloak, then took the left eyes of certain sacrificial victims and acted as if he were going to eat them. He also listened to the cries of sacred birds and to a volley of musketry fired in his honor by certain Bounty mutineers who were on the scene. Following this, the new king was treated to a dance, with Tahitian men pretending to cover him with excrement and semen as a kind of honor.

By 1824, when his son Pōmare III was crowned, the Tahitian coronation ritual had changed significantly, under the influence of foreign Christian missionaries. This time, a European-style rite was enacted, with the new king escorted to the Royal Chapel in Papeete behind a procession of flower-strewing girls accompanied by governors, judges and other civil servants. After being anointed and crowned, Pōmare was given a Bible and had a sermon preached to him. The festivities concluded with the proclamation of an amnesty and a coronation banquet.

Similar coronation ceremonies were performed by Prostestant missionaries, not just in Tahiti, but in the other French Polynesian islands, including the Leeward kingdoms of Huahine, Raiatea, and Bora Bora, and even the Austral Island of Rurutu.

=== Tonga ===
The ancient kings of Tonga were always crowned at Kanakubolu, near Hihifo, where they took the title of Tui Kanakubolu. The tree under which they sat was torn down in a gale in the 1890s; George Tupou II had pieces of wood from the fallen tree inlaid into the throne of Tonga. George and his successor, Sālote Tupou III, were crowned on 17 March 1893 and 11 October 1918, respectively. A European coronation ceremony had been introduced to the islands by Western missionaries, where it followed a centuries-old traditional Tongan rite involving the ritual drinking of kava by the new king, together with the receipt of dozens of cooked pigs and baskets of food.

In 1967 Tonga crowned king Tāufaʻāhau Tupou IV, while George Tupou V was crowned in 2008 and Tupou VI in 2015. All rulers participated in elaborate ceremonies complete with a large gold crown, sceptre, and throne. The Christian character of Tonga's monarchy was reiterated in the 2008 event—together with Tonga's former ties to Great Britain—as Anglican Archbishop of Polynesia Jabez Brice anointed King George Topou V with sacred chrism, just as in the British rite. However, the Master of the Royal Household, the Honourable Tu'ivauavou, described the kava ritual (as opposed to the Western-style ceremony) as "the true coronation", a sentiment echoed by royal spokesman Ma'u Kakala.

== See also ==
- Monarchies in Oceania
