= King of Niue =

The term King of Niue may refer to:

- Patu-iki
- List of Niuean monarchs
