= Monarchies in Oceania =

There are six monarchies in Oceania with an individual hereditary monarch, who is recognised as the head of state. Each is a constitutional monarchy: the sovereign inherits his or her office, usually keeps it until death or abdication, but is bound by laws and customs in the exercise of their powers. Five of these independent states share King Charles III as their head of state, making them part of a global grouping known as the Commonwealth realms; in addition, all monarchies of Oceania are members of the Commonwealth of Nations. The only sovereign monarchy in Oceania that does not share a monarch with another state is Tonga. Australia and New Zealand have dependencies within the region and outside it, although five non-sovereign constituent monarchs are recognised by New Zealand, Papua New Guinea and France.

== Current monarchies ==
State	Type	Succession	Dynasty	Title	Monarch	Reigning since	First in line
Commonwealth of Australia	Constitutional	Hereditary (absolute primogeniture)	Windsor	King	Charles III	8 September 2022	William, Prince of Wales
Realm of New Zealand	Constitutional	Hereditary (absolute primogeniture)	Windsor	King	Charles III	8 September 2022	William, Prince of Wales
Independent State of Papua New Guinea	Constitutional	Hereditary (absolute primogeniture)	Windsor	King	Charles III	8 September 2022	William, Prince of Wales
Solomon Islands	Constitutional	Hereditary (absolute primogeniture)	Windsor	King	Charles III	8 September 2022	William, Prince of Wales
Tuvalu	Constitutional	Hereditary (absolute primogeniture)	Windsor	King	Charles III	8 September 2022	William, Prince of Wales
Pitcairn, Henderson, Ducie and Oeno Islands	Constitutional	Hereditary (absolute primogeniture)	Windsor	King	Charles III	8 September 2022	William, Prince of Wales
Kingdom of Tonga	Constitutional	Hereditary (male-preference cognatic primogeniture)	Tupou	King	Tupou VI	18 March 2012	Tupoutoʻa ʻUlukalala

Traditional monarchies
State		Type	Succession	Monarch	Title	Reigning since	First in line
Māori King movement (New Zealand)		Traditional	Elective	Nga wai hono i te po	Te Arikinui	5 September 2024	Elected by tribal elders on monarch's death
Wallis and Futuna (France)	Uvea	Traditional	Elective	Patalione Kanimoa	Lavelua	3 June 2016	Elected by the Council of Chiefs
Wallis and Futuna (France)	Alo	Traditional	Elective	Lino Leleivai	Tu`i Agaifo	29 November 2018	Elected by the Council of Chiefs
Wallis and Futuna (France)	Sigave	Traditional	Elective	Eufenio Takala	Tu`i Sigave	5 March 2016	Elected by the Council of Chiefs

=== Commonwealth Realms ===
==== Australia ====

The Australian monarchy goes back a few hundred years. European explorers started encountering the continent of Australia from the early 17th century, and the Kingdom of Great Britain founded and peopled colonial settlement from 1788. Before the European settlement an estimated half-million Australian Aborigines formed hundreds of different social groupings. Eventually the British government granted Australians more and more powers to govern themselves. On 9 July 1900, in one of her last acts before she died on 22 January 1901, Queen Victoria gave the royal assent to the Commonwealth of Australia Act which would give Australia its own federal constitution and government. On 1 January 1901 the Governor General, Lord Hopetoun declared the federation of six Australian states and several territories in Centennial Park, Sydney. 30 years following that the Statute of Westminster granted equality to the realms and finally on 3 March 1986 Australia Act (in the United Kingdom and Australia) gave full independence to Australia in theory, although in practice it was already operating mostly independently.

In 1999 Australia held a referendum on whether to become a republic or not; the referendum resulted in the retention of the Australian monarchy. The majority of all voters and all states rejected the proposal.

The realm of Australia comprises six federated states and three federal territories (including the Jervis Bay Territory). It also includes a number of external territories administered by the federal government: Ashmore and Cartier Islands, Christmas Island, Cocos (Keeling) Islands, Coral Sea Islands, Heard Island and McDonald Islands, Norfolk Island, and the Australian Antarctic Territory.

==== New Zealand ====

New Zealand also had a native people before the arrival of European colonisers; the Māori, a Polynesian people, settled the islands around AD 1300. The Treaty of Waitangi, signed on 6 February 1840, was an agreement between Māori chiefs in the North Island and representatives of the then British Crown; roughly 500 other Māori chiefs throughout New Zealand later signed. Following the Treaty, the islands of New Zealand became a British Crown colony and Queen Victoria became the monarch over New Zealand.

The New Zealand monarchy has evolved to become a distinctly New Zealand institution, represented by unique symbols. The King of New Zealand is legally considered a distinct monarch from the monarch of the United Kingdom. This has been the case since the passage of the Statute of Westminster, which introduced the concept that though Britain and the dominions have sovereigns who are legally and constitutionally distinct even though they are shared in body. The Constitution Act 1986 declares that "The Sovereign in right of New Zealand is the head of State of New Zealand, and shall be known by the royal style and titles proclaimed from time to time". The King's constitutional roles have been almost entirely delegated to a governor-general, whom he appoints on the advice of the prime minister of the day. When Queen Elizabeth II visited New Zealand she had presided over the opening of Parliament, and had performed other acts normally delegated to the governor-general. The role of the monarchy in New Zealand is a recurring topic of public discussion.

The Realm of New Zealand is the entire area over which the King of New Zealand is sovereign, and comprises two associated states, Niue and the Cook Islands, and the territories of Tokelau and the Ross Dependency (New Zealand's territorial claim in Antarctica).

The Māori King movement, called the Kīngitanga (Note: Also spelled Kiingitanga. The preferred orthography of the Waikato-Tainui iwi is to use doubled vowels rather than macrons to indicate long vowels.) in Māori, is a movement that arose among some of the Māori iwi (tribes) of New Zealand in the central North Island in the 1850s, to establish a role similar in status to that of the monarch of the British colonists, as a way of halting the alienation of Māori land. The Māori monarch operates in a non-constitutional capacity with no legal or judicial power within the New Zealand government. Reigning monarchs retain the position of paramount chief of several iwi and wield some power over these, especially within the Tainui iwi.

==== Papua New Guinea ====

The monarchy of Papua New Guinea (the Papua New Guinean Monarchy) is a system of government in which a hereditary monarch is the head of state. The present monarch of Papua New Guinea is King Charles III. The monarch is constitutionally represented by the Governor-General of Papua New Guinea, whose roles and powers are laid out by the Constitution of the Independent State of Papua New Guinea.

After being ruled by three external powers since 1884, Papua New Guinea gained its independence from Australia in 1975. It chose to become a kingdom with its own monarch.

==== Solomon Islands ====

The Head of State of the Solomon Islands is King Charles III. The Solomon Islands share the Sovereign with a number of Commonwealth realms. The King's constitutional roles have been almost entirely delegated to the Governor-General of the Solomon Islands. Royal succession is governed by the English Act of Settlement of 1701, which is part of constitutional law.

On all matters of the Solomon Island State, the Monarch is advised solely by Solomon Island ministers, not British or otherwise.

==== Tuvalu ====

The first inhabitants of Tuvalu were Polynesian people. The islands came under the UK's sphere of influence in the late 19th century. The Ellice Islands were administered by Britain as part of a protectorate from 1892 to 1916 and as part of the Gilbert and Ellice Islands Colony from 1916 to 1974. In 1974 the Ellice Islanders voted for separate British dependency status as Tuvalu, separating from the Gilbert Islands which became Kiribati upon independence. Tuvalu became fully independent within The Commonwealth in 1978.

A constitutional referendum held on 30 April 2008 turned out 1,260 to 679 votes in favour of retaining the monarchy.

=== Tonga ===

The House of Tupou was formed in 1875 when the monarch's constitutional role was put forth.

In July 2008, three days before his coronation, King George Tupou V announced that he would relinquish most of his power and be guided by his Prime Minister's recommendations on most matters.

The current monarch is Tupou VI.

=== Wallis and Futuna ===
The islands that make up Wallis and Futuna

Wallis and Futuna is an overseas collectivity of the French Republic in Polynesia consisting of three main islands (Wallis, Futuna, and the mostly uninhabited Alofi) and a number of tiny islets. The collectivity is made up of three traditional kingdoms: `Uvea, on the island of Wallis, Sigave, on the western part of the island of Futuna, and Alo, on the island of Alofi and on the eastern part of the island of Futuna. The King of Uvea is Patalione Kanimoa, the King of Sigave is Eufenio Takala and the King of Alo is Lino Leleivai. The territory was annexed by the French Republic in 1888, and was placed under the authority of another French colony, New Caledonia. The inhabitants of the islands voted in a 1959 referendum to become an overseas collectivity of France, effective in 1961. The collectivity is governed as a parliamentary republic, the citizens elect a Territorial Assembly, the President of which becomes head of government. His cabinet, the Council of the Territory, is made up of the three Kings and three appointed ministers. In addition to this limited parliamentary role the Kings play, the individual kingdoms' customary legal systems have some jurisdiction in areas of civil law.

== Former monarchies ==
Note: the dates of abolition are from the moment the kingdoms lost their sovereignty; sometimes the kingship were still retained under colonial rule

- Marquesas Islands: Abolished (Sovereignty in 1842)
  - Taiohae (Nuku Hiva): Abolished (1901)
  - Tahuata: Abolished (1889)
- Kingdom of Tahiti: Abolished (1880)
- Huahine: Abolished (1895)
- Kingdom of Raiatea: Abolished (1888)
- Kingdom of Bora Bora: Abolished (1895)
- Mangareva: Abolished (1881)
- Rurutu: Abolished (1900)
- Rimatara: Abolished (1901)
- Rapa Iti: Abolished (1881)
- Kingdom of Hawaii: Abolished (1893)
- Samoa: Status change (2007)
- Tokelau Abolished (Unknown Date)
- Niuē-Fekai: Abolished (1917)
- Kingdom of Rarotonga: Abolished (1893)
- Kingdom of Rapa Nui: Abolished (1888)
- Kingdom of Fiji: Abolished (1874 native)
- Abemama: Abolished (1979)
- Ralik: Abolished (1910)
- Yapese Empire: Abolished (c. 1945)
- Saudeleur dynasty: Abolished (c. 1628)
- Kosrae: Abolished (c. 1870)

== See also ==
- Coronations in Oceania
- Monarchism
- Monarchies in the Americas
- Monarchies in Europe
- Monarchies in Africa
- Monarchies in Asia
- Māori King Movement (the position of Māori monarch is a non-constitutional role with no legal power in New Zealand).
- Customary kingdoms of Wallis and Futuna
