= Economy of Niue =

Statistics
- GDP: $28.9 million
- All values, unless otherwise stated, are in US dollars.

The economy of Niue is heavily dependent upon aid from New Zealand. Government expenditures regularly exceed revenues, and grants from New Zealand make up the shortfall and are used to pay wages to public employees. Niue has cut government expenditures by reducing the public service by almost half.

== Local economic activity ==
The agricultural sector consists mainly of subsistence gardening, although some cash crops are grown for export. Industry consists primarily of small factories to process passion fruit, lime oil, honey, and coconut cream. The sale of postage stamps to foreign collectors has historically been an important source of revenue.

The island in recent years has suffered a serious loss of population because of migration of Niueans to New Zealand. Efforts to increase GDP include the promotion of tourism. An initiative into the financial services industry was dropped under pressure from the US Treasury. More recently the sale of Internet domain names under the NU top level domain has brought in some income. These domains are particularly popular in Scandinavia, Belgium and the Netherlands, since nu means "now" in Dutch and the Scandinavian languages.

== Agriculture ==
=== Coconut production ===
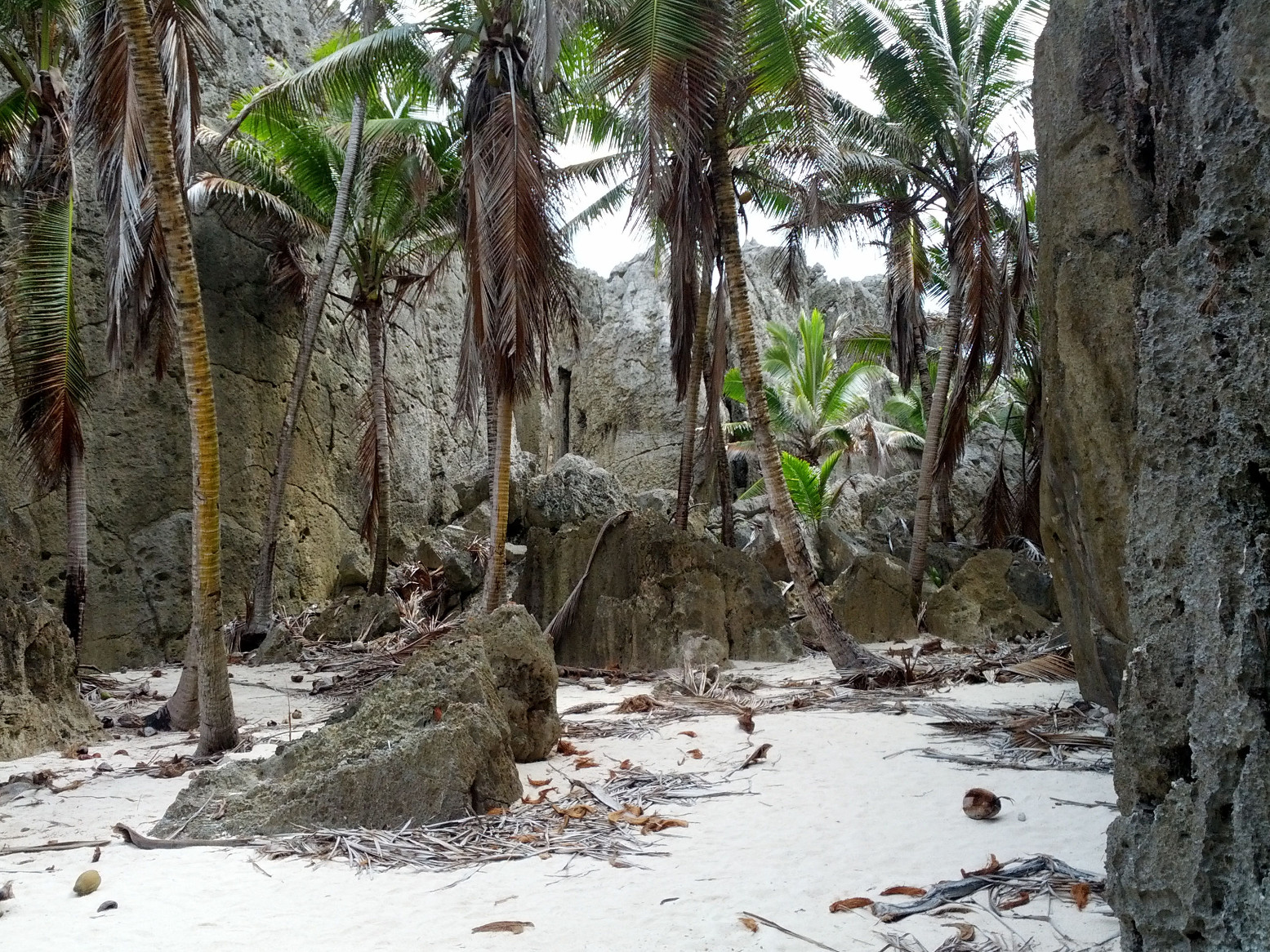
Niue landscape with coconut trees

In 2013, the island country Niue produced 3,200 tonnes of coconuts valued at INT$385,830. Coconut is a cash crop on the island, which is converted to derivatives such as copra and coconut cream in tinned form, and also exported. Originally, the island had a profusion of coconut trees reflected in the country's name, Niue, in the local language. The Niue Development Board is responsible for planning and execution of schemes of agricultural produce, including coconut and related products.

Niue also exports organic items such as taro, vanilla, and honey. This is particularly targetted towards New Zealand and the earnings from this practice are very low.

=== Fishing industry ===
The Fishing industry in Niue contributes to the local economy and is popular with visitors. It has been described in fishing media as the "fisherman’s secret paradise". The island is rich in resources of Black, blue and striped Marlin, Skipjack, Yellowfin Tuna, Red Bass, Mahimahi, Sailfish, Wahoo and Giant Trevally. One of the notable charter boats operating is the Wahoo Fishing Charters, operated by Graham Marsh since 1983. The largest charter vessel on the island is the 7.5 metres (25 ft) Horizon. Fishing on the island is considered a taboo on Sunday. Fresh fish caught is sold to restaurants such as Kaiika Restaurant in Alofi.

== Infrastructure ==
=== Transport ===
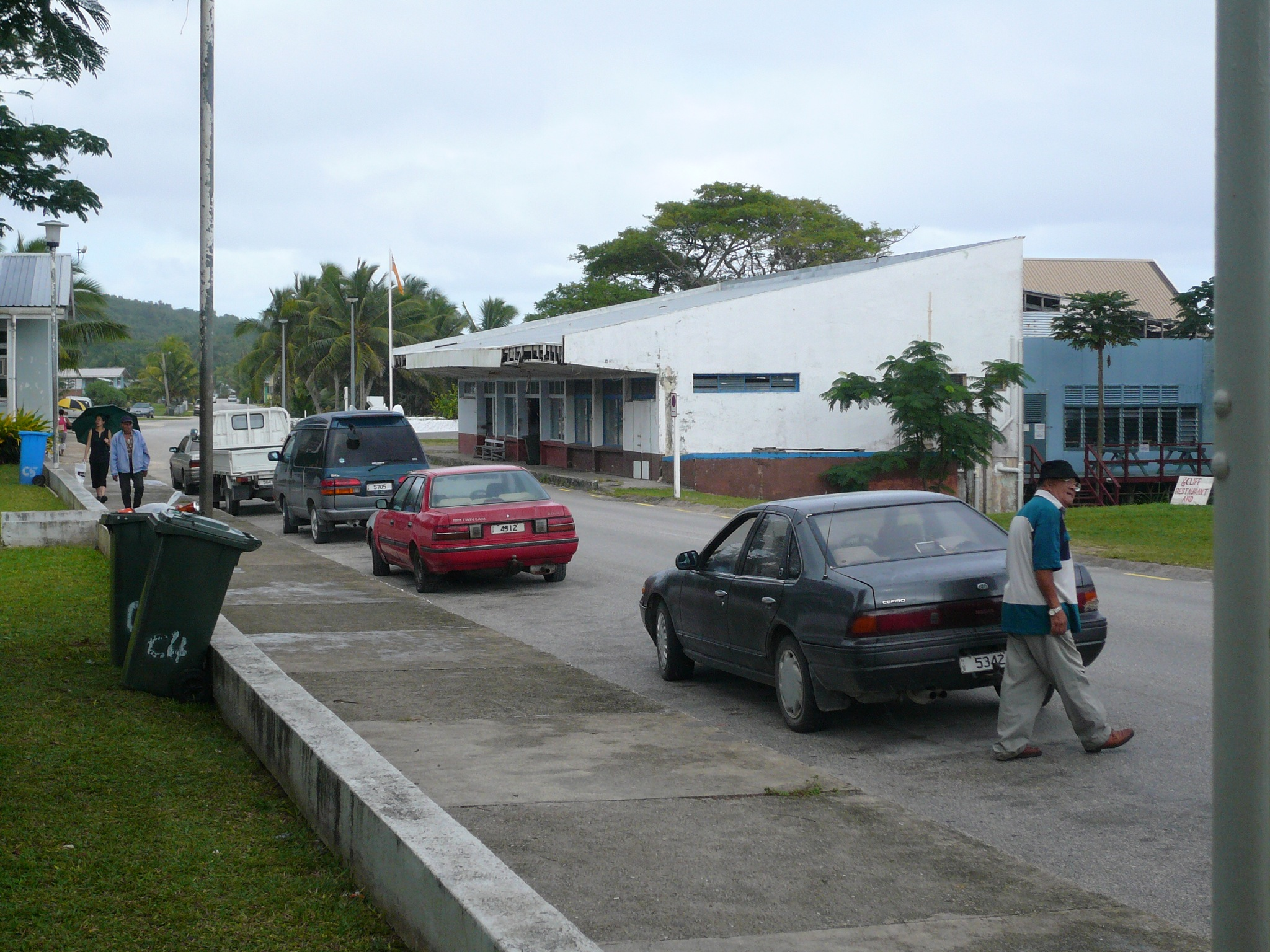
With a relatively substantial road network, car travel is common in Niue.

Transport in Niue takes place on a road network, and via an (international) airport and a sea port.

A ring road around the island's coast is the major route, and roads cross the central plateau linking Alofi to the villages of Lakepa, Liku and Hakupu on the opposite coast. All villages in Niue are connected by roads. There are utility roads to the inland and some coastal areas, unsealed, used mainly for accessing taro plantations, coconut areas and walking access to the sea.

Niue International Airport in the west, south of Alofi, is the only airfield. It was extended in 1995 to allow Boeing 737 aircraft to take off with maximum weight. Boeing 737-300, 737-800 and Boeing 757 aircraft have used the airport. Air New Zealand is the only airline serving Niue, with a weekly flight from Auckland. The flight is operated with an A320 departing Auckland on Saturday and arriving the previous day due to the International Date Line. The flight from Niue departs on Friday.

Niue has a sea port, Sir Roberts Wharf in Alofi, which can be used only by flat-bottomed smaller vessels. The cargo ship Forum Pacific from Reef Shipping uses the wharf when the sea is calm. Otherwise cargo vessels and fishing boats use moorings about 100 metres from the reef, and barges are used to offload their cargo.

Most Niuean households own a vehicle. There are four car-rental companies, which also hire bicycles, motorbikes and minibuses.

=== Communications ===
Communications in Niue include postal, telephone, internet, press and radio.

== Currency ==
Niue, a country in free association with New Zealand, uses only one official legal tender currency, which is the New Zealand dollar.

Before the creation of the New Zealand dollar in 1967, Niue was a user of the New Zealand pound and its very early commemorative coins of Niue were in pound or shilling increments.

Niue first began issuing coins in 1966. These have been mostly bullion and non-circulating base metal commemorative issues. They are acceptable as legal tender within Niue, though unlikely to be found anywhere on the island.

== Economic statistics ==
GDP: USD31 million (2026)

GDP: purchasing power parity – $10 million (2003),

GDP – real growth rate: 6.2% (2003 est.)

GDP – per capita: nominal - USD17,004 (2026)

purchasing power parity – $5,800 (2003), $15,066 (2011)

GDP – composition by sector:
agriculture: 23% (2003)
industry: 27% (2003)
services: 50% (2003)

Population below poverty line: 13%

Household income or consumption by percentage share:
lowest 10%: NA%
highest 10%: NA%

Inflation rate (consumer prices): 1% (1995)

Labor force: 450 (1992 est.) 663 (2001 est.)

Labor force – by occupation: Most people work on family plantations; paid work exists only in government service, small industry, and on the Niue Development Board

Unemployment rate: 12% (2001)

Budget:
revenues: $15.07 million (FY 04-05) $26 million (FY 18-19)
expenditures: $16.33 million

Industries: tourism, handicrafts, food processing

Industrial production growth rate: NA%

Electricity – production: 3 GWh (1998)

Electricity – production by source:
fossil fuel: 100%
hydro: 0% (2010)
nuclear: 0% (2010)
other: 0% (1998)

Electricity – consumption: 3 GWh (1998)

Electricity – exports: 0 kWh (1998)

Electricity – imports: 0 kWh (1998)

Agriculture – products: coconuts, passion fruit, honey, limes, taro, yams, cassava (tapioca), sweet potatoes; pigs, poultry, beef cattle

Exports: $3.52 million 2014, USD1.391 million (2016)

Exports – commodities: canned coconut cream, copra, honey, passion fruit products, pawpaws, root crops, limes, footballs, stamps, handicrafts

In 2014:

- Iron Structures ($576k)
- Refined petroleum ($456k)
- Cement ($277k)
- Fruit Juice ($224k)
- Delivery Trucks ($143k)

Exports – partners: New Zealand 89%, Fiji, Cook Islands, Australia.

In 2014:

- Senegal 44% ($1.55M)
- Czech Republic 12% ($413k)
- New Zealand 10% ($334k)
- Gambia 8% ($277k)
- United States 5% ($169k)

Imports: $9 million (2003), $19 million (2014), USD14.95 million (2016), NZD$21.5 million (2018)

Imports – commodities: food, live animals, manufactured goods, machinery, fuels, lubricants, chemicals, drugs

In 2014: Special Purpose Ships ($5.48M), Refined Petroleum ($2.93M), Large Construction Vehicles ($403k), Prefabricated Buildings ($402k) and Cars ($312k).

Imports – partners: New Zealand 59%, Fiji 20%, Japan 13%, Samoa, Australia, United States

In 2014:

- New Zealand ($12.4M)
- Japan ($5.58M)
- Canada ($232k)
- Fiji ($211k)
- Australia ($147k)

Debt – external: $NA

Economic aid – recipient: $8.3 million (1995), $5.7 million (FY 08-09)

Currency: 1 New Zealand dollar (NZ$) = 100 cents

Exchange rates: New Zealand dollars (NZ$) per US$1 – 1.9451 (January 2000), 1.8889 (1999), 1.8629 (1998), 1.5082 (1997), 1.4543 (1996), 1.5235 (1995)

Fiscal year: 1 April – 31 March
