= Niue in World War I =

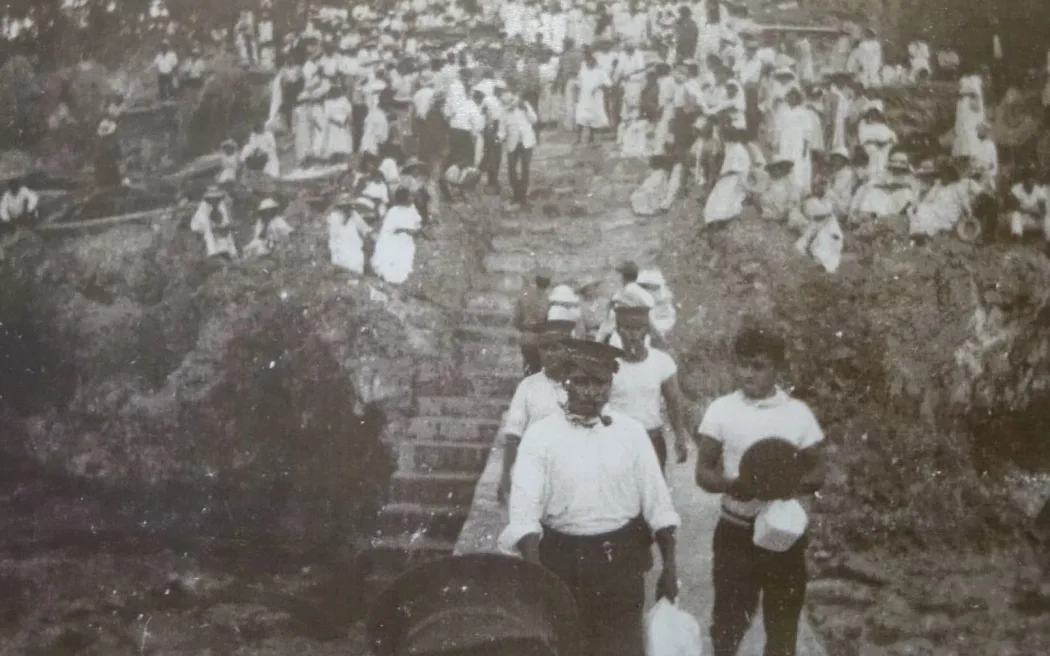
Niueans preparing to leave their island, 1915

The Kingdom of Niue-Fekai (at the time of the war a British Protectorate) sided with the Entente powers during the First World War. Due to Niue's isolation and lack of communication with the outside world, it took five weeks for the news of the war to reach the island. Within two days of the news of the war, Niuean citizens raised £165 for the New Zealand Red Cross and as many as 150 Niueans volunteered to fight for New Zealand.

== Background ==
Niue was ruled by the Tongan empire until it broke off after the empire collapsed under the weight of separatist movements. The newly founded kingdom was an elective monarchy, with the chiefs of Niue electing a king who would hold the title "King of Niue" until their death.

In the 19th century, the colonial powers of Europe began to expand their influence into the Pacific. This raised concern amongst the Niuean population, who had no means of protecting themselves from foreign invaders. During the reign of Fata-a-iki, Niue appealed to the British Empire to become a British Protectorate. Many of Fata-a-iki's appeals were rejected until 1899, when Queen Victoria accepted his appeal. Niue became a British Protectorate in 1900. A year later, it was formally annexed into New Zealand.

== Course of the war ==
Niue was "possibly as far away from the conflict as could be imagined". Due to its remote isolation, and with no shipping routes going to the island, Niue’s residents only learnt of the war five weeks after it had already begun. Despite this, they were quick to act in supporting their allies by raising over £165 for the New Zealand Red Cross.

At the beginning of the war, the British Empire was not willing to accept native recruits, but after the Gallipoli campaign in 1915, natives were allowed to enlist and serve in the army. In Niue, whilst there was opposition to recruiting Niueans for the war effort from figures such as Ikimatatoa (a missionary teacher) many volunteered to enlist, as they had felt close to the crown from the teachings of the London Missionary Society. Despite this, New Zealand only accepted the required number of 150. The first Niuean to enlist was Hekataha Uea, a 40-year-old pastor and independence advocate who was appointed as Chaplain of the small volunteer force which would later be called the Niue Contingent. He was the oldest amongst the Niuean volunteers, and was seen as "a father figure, a role model, and a matua ('father' in Niuean)". He would later be promoted to Sergeant major of the Niue Contingent. The Niuean volunteers started their training in Alofi, and were eventually sent to the Narrow Neck (Nalo Neke in Niuean) military training camp in Auckland, where they would be trained with handling weapons and constructing trenches.

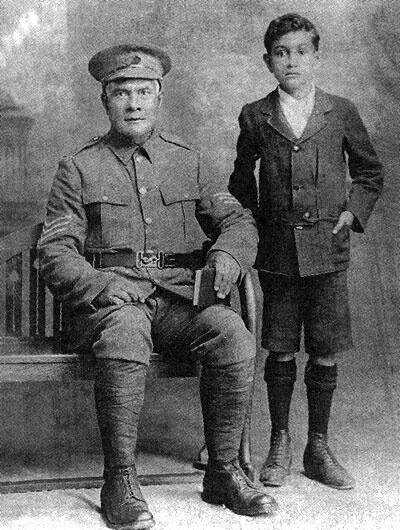
Sergeant-Major Uea of Niue with his son Makanetiaki. He is remembered as a 'strong, proud, lovely man' who looked out for his men.

=== Challenges from the outset ===
For many of the Niueans, it was their first time leaving their island. A majority of the Niuean Volunteers also did not speak English, which led to a huge language barrier between the New Zealand officers and Niuean men. Fortunately, Uea knew English and was able to help with communications between the Niueans and New Zealanders. The language barrier was not the only issue that the Niueans faced, however. Many of them had never worn boots or uniforms, and found them uncomfortable, which made marches difficult for the Niueans.

Food was another problem that the Niueans faced. The diet enforced upon the Niueans was hard to adjust to, and did not fit their pre-war food consumption. This eventually lead to the officers changing the diet to include more fish and fruit.

Their biggest challenge, though, was the climate. Many Niueans were not used to the cold that they had experienced in Narrow Neck, and one reportedly died from the cold he experienced.

=== From New Zealand to Egypt ===
Come on deck to see for yourself the Red Sea you know from the Bible.

— Uea

On 5 February 1916, the Niueans departed from Auckland on the SS Navua. As they neared Egypt, where they were supposed to be deployed, an outbreak of measles occurred, and many of the Niueans contracted the illness. The illness would have a big effect on the Niueans, as they did not have a strong immune system to combat it, which could lead to them attracting secondary effects such as pneumonia. On 15 February, the ship arrived in Suez, and 15 Niueans were hospitalised, including Uea.

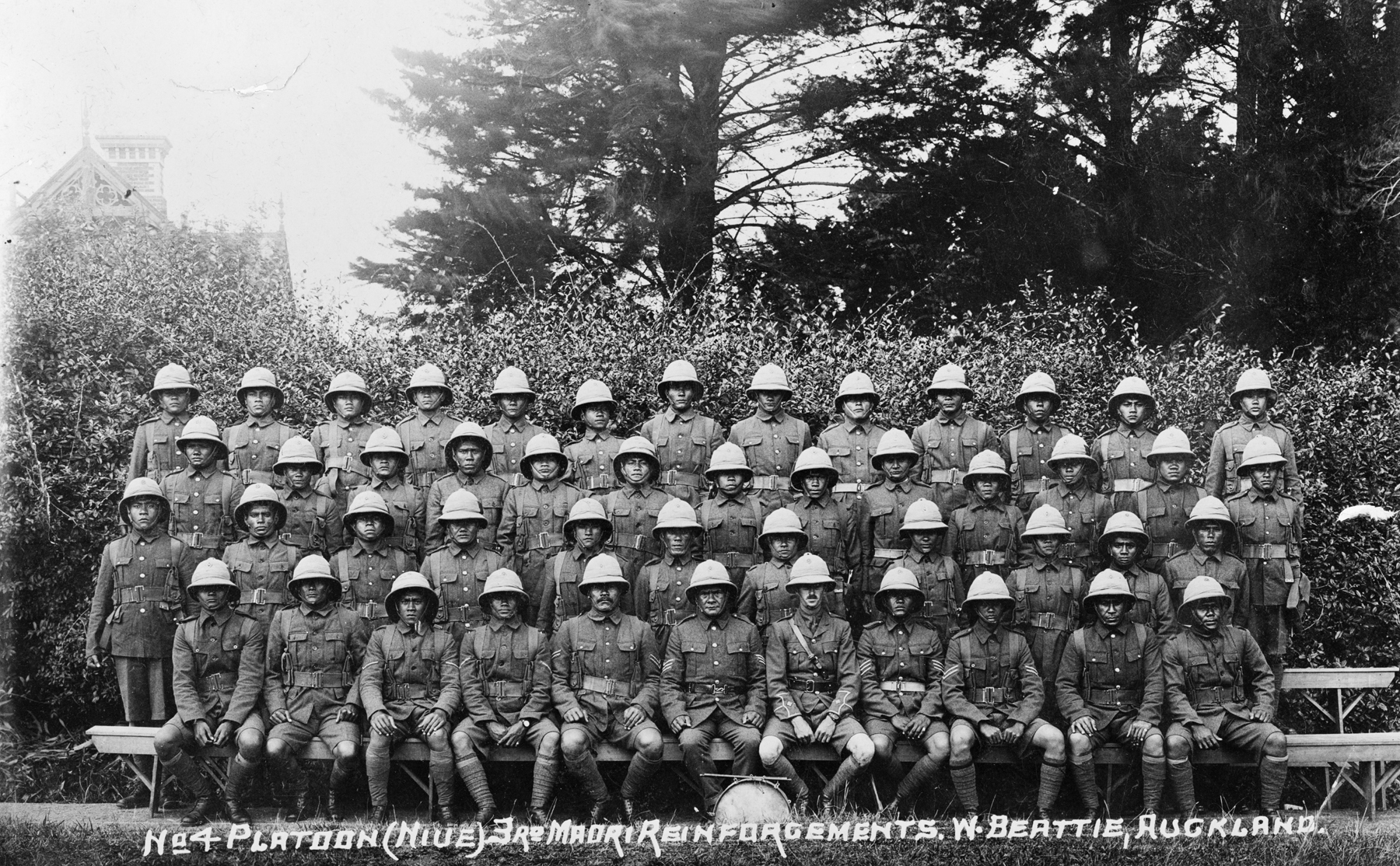
A group photo of the Niue Contingent

After a period of isolation from their fellow volunteers, Uea and the other hospitalised members rejoined the contingent. They had recovered from measles but were facing the winter season. This would be detrimental to the Niueans, as a majority of them had never experienced winter. By April of the same year, 52% of the contingent's volunteers were hospitalised. Many became too ill to serve, and were sent back home to Niue. The remaining 52 volunteers, including Uea, continued to the Western Front.

=== Western Front ===
What remained of the Niue Contingent continued on to France, where conditions would only worsen. in France, a further 82% of the contingent's volunteers would be hospitalised due to the French winter. In late May 1916, the New Zealand Division would order the Niuean troops to move west to the New Zealand base depot in Étaples, and then to the New Zealand Convalescent Hospital in Hornchurch, after which they would be taken home.

=== Niue Contingent in Hornchurch ===
While in Hornchurch, the Niueans, who were primarily Christians, attended church on Sundays. There, Uea would translate the services into Niuean for the volunteers. A majority of Niueans brought Bibles with them to the war, which gave them comfort and a sense of home. After their time in Hornchurch, they would embark for Niue.

== Aftermath ==
The New Zealand government arranged a war memorial to be built in the capital of Niue (Alofi). In 1926, the government presented a roll of honour to be presented in the church of Alofi. The servicemen of the Niue contingent were not given any financial compensation.

Niue's contribution was acknowledged by the government of New Zealand with visits to the island by government ministers and the governor-general, the gifting of captured German guns, and boards of honour being given to the volunteers.

Reintegration to Niuean society was hard for the returning servicemen. Exposure to a new world during their time in Egypt and France made it difficult to reintegrate into the predominantly church-controlled and colonial-administered society of Niue. Reality did not meet expectations for many of the servicemen, and some left the island once more in search of job opportunities. Others made adjustments and were able to reintegrate into Niuean society, obtaining leading positions in the island.

After the war, Uea petitioned the New Zealand government to compensate the Niuean servicemen for their service on the front. He would also stand up for the needs of other servicemen. Uea continued to go to church after he had seen the horrors of war and was awarded the British War Medal. Uea would die in 1947.

In World War II, approximately 80 Niueans served in the New Zealand Defence Force during the war, whilst many more would help with labour and construction units across the Pacific.

== See also ==
- New Zealand in World War I
- History of Niue
