= LGBTQ rights in Niue =

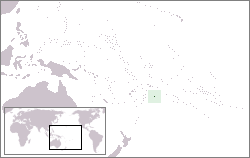
- Niue
- Legal status: Legal since 2024
- Military: New Zealand's responsibility
- Discrimination protections: No

Family rights
- Recognition of relationships: No
- Adoption: No

Lesbian, gay, bisexual, and transgender (LGBT) people in Niue face legal challenges not experienced by non-LGBTQ residents. Same-sex couples and households headed by same-sex couples are not eligible for the same legal protections available to opposite-sex married couples.

== History ==
Similarly to the Cook Islands, Samoa and New Zealand, Niue possesses a traditional third gender population: the fiafifine (also known as the fakafifine). They have traditionally been accepted by Niuean society, and would play an important domestic role in communal life.

In 2007, during a gathering of delegates from around the Pacific in Māngere, New Zealand, a local fiafifine called out the discrimination and stigma faced by the fiafifine community: "Our communities were an accepted part of Pacific life and culture prior to Western colonisation, but have been subject to much stigma and discrimination in more recent times."

== Laws regarding same-sex sexual activity ==
=== Criminal Law Code ===
Male homosexual activity was formerly illegal in Niue, but was decriminalized by the Niue (Sexual Offences) Amendment Act 2024 enacted on 5 June 2024.

Consensual male sodomy was previously punishable by up to ten years' imprisonment, while indecency between males is punishable by up to five years' imprisonment under sections 43 and 44 of the Criminal Law Code, excepted below. These sections have been repealed:

43 Buggery

(1) Every one is liable to imprisonment for 10 years who commits buggery either with a human being or with any other living creature.
(2) This offence is complete upon penetration.

44 Attempted buggery and indecent assaults on males

(1) Every one is liable to imprisonment for 5 years who –

(a) Attempts to commit buggery; or
(b) Assaults any person with intent to commit buggery; or
(c) Being a male, indecently assaults any other male person. (2) It is no defence to a charge of indecent assault on a male person of any age that he consented to the act of indecency.

== Recognition of same-sex relationships ==
Same-sex unions are not recognised (even though they are in New Zealand). Section 6 of the Family Relationships Act 2022 expressly prohibits same-sex marriages.

== Living conditions ==
Much like the rest of Polynesia, open displays of affection between partners regardless of sexual orientation may offend.

== Summary table ==
Same-sex sexual activity legal	Yes
Equal age of consent	Yes
Anti-discrimination laws in employment only	No
Anti-discrimination laws in the provision of goods and services	No
Anti-discrimination laws in all other areas (Incl. indirect discrimination, hate speech)	No
Same-sex marriages	No
Recognition of same-sex couples	No
Stepchild adoption by same-sex couples	No
Joint adoption by same-sex couples	No
LGBT people allowed to serve openly in the military	Yes (New Zealand's responsibility)
Right to change legal gender	No
Access to IVF for lesbians	No
Commercial surrogacy for gay male couples	No
MSMs allowed to donate blood	No

== See also ==
- Human rights in Niue
- LGBTQ rights in New Zealand
- LGBTQ rights in Oceania
