= Transport in Niue =

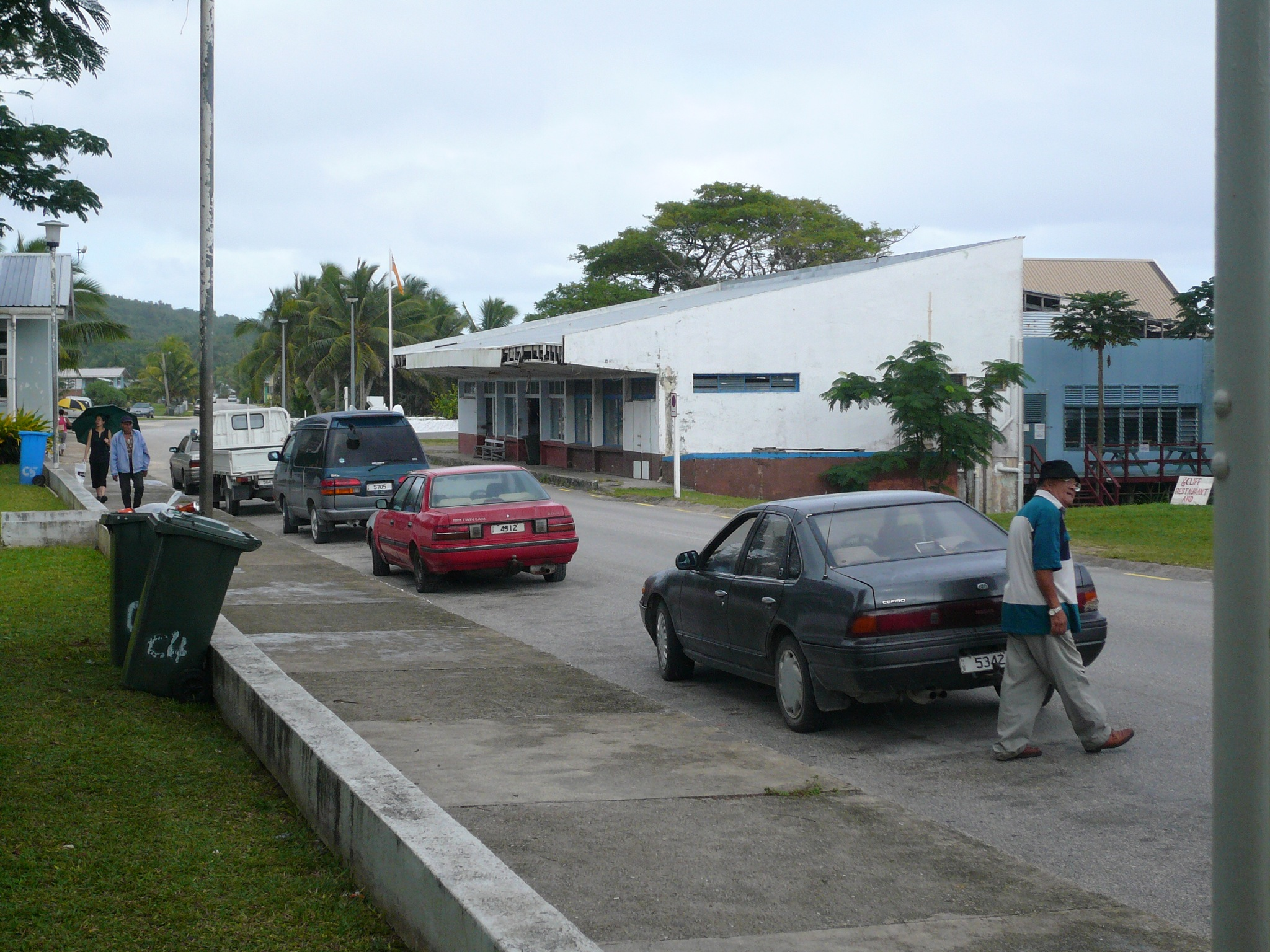
With a relatively substantial road network, car travel is common in Niue.

Transport in Niue takes place on a road network, and via an (international) airport and a sea port.

A ring road around the island's coast is the major route, and roads cross the central plateau linking Alofi to the villages of Lakepa, Liku and Hakupu on the opposite coast. All villages in Niue are connected by roads. There are utility roads to the inland and some coastal areas, unsealed, used mainly for accessing taro plantations, coconut areas and walking access to the sea.

Niue International Airport in the west, south of Alofi, is the only airfield. It was extended in 1995 to allow Boeing 737 aircraft to take off with maximum weight. Boeing 737-300, 737-800 and Boeing 757 aircraft have used the airport. Air New Zealand is the only airline serving Niue, with a weekly flight from Auckland. The flight is operated with an A320 departing Auckland on Saturday and arriving the previous day due to the International Date Line. The flight from Niue departs on Friday.

Niue has a sea port, Sir Roberts Wharf in Alofi, which can be used only by flat-bottomed smaller vessels. The cargo ship Forum Pacific from Reef Shipping uses the wharf when the sea is calm. Otherwise cargo vessels and fishing boats use moorings about 100 metres from the reef, and barges are used to offload their cargo.

Most Niuean households own a vehicle. There are four car-rental companies, which also hire bicycles, motorbikes and minibuses. There is no rail network.

== Statistics ==
Railways: 0 km

Highways:
total: 234 km
tarsealed: 210 km
unsealed: 24 km

Ports and harbors: none; offshore anchorage only

Merchant marine: none (1999 est.)

Airports: 1 (Niue International Airport)

Airports - with paved runways:
total: 1
1,524 to 2,437 m: 1 (1999 est.)
