= Communications in Niue =

Communications in Niue include postal, telephone, internet, press and radio.

== Telecommunications services ==
Telephone service is provided by Telecom Niue, the sole provider, which services 1,100 landlines and fixed wireless lines. It also operates a cellular telephone service on the AMPS and GSM platforms.

Internet users: 1,485 (December, 2020)

Telephones – main lines in use: 1,100 (800 land line, 300 fixed wireless) (2003)

Telephones – mobile cellular: undisclosed (excludes 300 fixed wireless) (2003)

Telephones – GSM mobile cellular: undisclosed (2011)

Telephone system:
domestic: single-line telephone system connects all villages on island
international: provided by Telecom Niue (IDD code: 683)

== Radio ==
Radio broadcast stations: AM 1, FM 1, shortwave 0 (1998)

Radios: 1,000 (1997)

Television broadcast stations: 1 (1997)

Televisions: NA

== Postal ==
Postal services are through the Niue Post Office.

== Newspapers ==
Niue has only one printed newspaper, the Niue Star, founded in 1993. Until 2002, the Auckland-based Pasifika Times was also circulated in Niue.

== Internet service ==
Niue has free Internet service through the efforts of the Internet Users Society Niue, established 1999. However users need to pay NZD$25 to a local IT company to register the MAC address of their WiFi card before being able to log into this WiFi network.

Alternatively, where ADSL is available, users can have connections through Telecom Niue's Internet Services located at Alofi through their island-wide distributed wireline.

=== .nu Internet domain ===
The .nu TLD is assigned to Niue.

Niue, through an outside company, registers Internet domain names, so most .nu web addresses are not actually located in Niue. They are commonly used by Danish, Dutch and Swedish websites, because in those languages 'nu' means “now”.

Niue was the first country in the world to plan on offering free nationwide WiFi internet access, more than five million websites are available/accessible in Niue, using the funds provided by the domain registrations. 79.6% of Niueans were internet users in 2022.
