= Women in Niue =

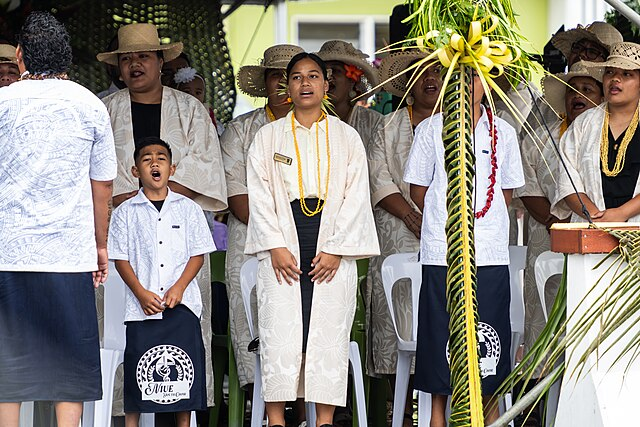
Photo of Niuean citizens singing at a US Embassy in New Zealand for the 50th anniversary of Niue Constitution Day, taken on October 19th, 2025

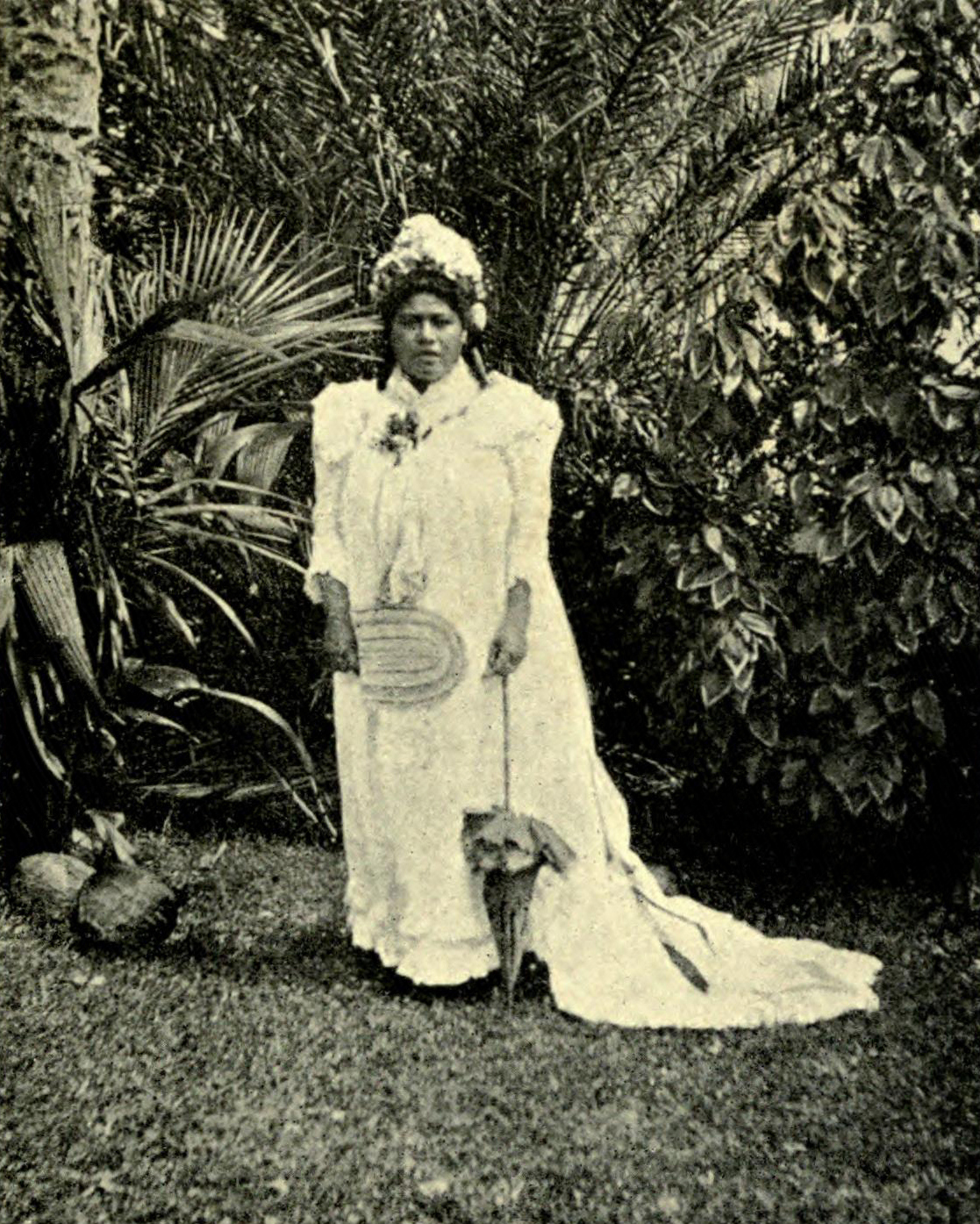
The Queen of Niue, wife of the Fata-a-iki (meaning "King of Niue" in the Niuean language); photograph taken around 1902

While the status of women in Niue continues to progress on a country-wide level, there are no legal protections set in place to ensure equality between men and women. Despite this, reports show that Niuean women's participation in male-dominated spaces has increased since the adoption of the Niue Constitution in 1974.

A large percentage of Niuean citizens own their homes, however, only 27.7% of women headed these households as of 2022. Economic indicators reveal that men make up a higher percentage of the Niuean workforce than women, and that women are significantly more likely to leave the workforce due to domestic duties.

Niuean women have historically been represented in the domestic sphere, with women performing more than half of all housework and caretaking duties. Despite legislative shortcomings and a lack of representation in the public sphere, women continue to shape cultural and societal norms within Niue.

== History ==
The first women of Niue arrived on the island approximately 1,500 years ago, with tradition suggesting these settlements came from various Polynesian islands. Niue is one of the smallest island countries in the world, making its population of women comparatively small to other islands in Polynesia. Although Niue has been in free-association with New Zealand since 1974, they are a self-governing state. Niuean women have had the right to vote since the first Niue Constitution Day in 1974.

Historical accounts of women's roles in Niue have survived largely via oral tradition. According to these accounts, Niuean women performed much of the domestic labor and managed care-taking roles, while men worked in the agricultural sector. Despite a lack of accounts of women's history in Niuean tradition, they played a major role in the formation of the island's cultural identity.

The missionary John Williams was the first European to enter the island in 1830. Most Niuean oral history of Williams' brief visit to Niue does not denote gender, with implications of male dominance in defense forces. Williams was the first missionary to introduce Christianity to the island, the dominant religion in modern day Niue. While women participate in the church, they historically have been barred from major leadership roles, and these unequal representation persists today.

== Politics ==
Niue’s political system largely derives from the Westminster system, with the Niue Assembly consisting of 20 members. As of 2026, there are 6 women in Niue’s parliament, elected in the 2023 general election. This represents an increase from 15% to 30% of Parliament seats held by women from 2020 to 2023.

Women have had the right to run for office since 1974, 14 years after Niue’s first general election. Despite this, a female cabinet member was not appointed in Niue until 1993. While women’s participation in government remains below 50%, Niue’s representation of women in government has increased since 1974.

Each of the 14 villages in Niue have a village council, and women are more likely to hold seats in these councils than in common roll seats. Niuean media reported in 2015 that at the time, around 50% of village council seats were held by women, without any Temporary Special Measures (TSMs) in place.

Despite a lack of representation at a national level, Niuean women's participation in village council is integral to parliament. There is a lack of research on what type of restraints such as stigma, stereotypes, or time poverty may be the cause of a lack of women in Niue's national government. Niuean social norms have been identified as a major barrier to women's participation, with familial ties and customs of respect being integral to who participates in government.

== Gender-based violence ==
Gender-based violence has been under surveyed in Niue, but reports from Niue’s Police and Health Department indicate that it is a country-wide problem. In Niue, issues of domestic violence and intimate-partner violence are often handled within the village through extended family. While domestic violence is often handled within the village, sexual violence is a taboo that is rarely shared with other village members.

Despite a lack of research or statistics related to gender-based violence, UN Women estimate that between 60-80% of women in the Pacific have experienced gender-based violence. In Niue, there is no legislation condemning or preventing gender-based violence. Sexual violence against girls younger than 15 is common, and resolutions to sexual misconduct with minors is often handled in spaces outside of the law through mediation in the church, or via village elders.

Between 1974 and 1988, any legislation signed into law by New Zealand extended to Niue by association, which included CEDAW, the Convention on the Elimination of Discrimination against Women. After 1988, CEDAW no longer applies to Niue, and the Niuean government has not formally ratified the legislation.

Despite a lack of comprehensive legislation, movements to prevent gender-based violence in the Pacific Islands have extended to Niue. In 2015, Niue signed the Denarau 2015 Agreement, which reaffirmed their commitment to upholding human rights. Niue also joined the Prevention of Domestic Violence Programme (PPDVP) in 2007, an agreement to train police forces in the Pacific to end impunity for gender-based violence.

== Reproductive rights ==
In Niue, consent and marriage laws are not equally applied to men and women, with women’s marital age with parental consent being 15, and men’s being 18. Data from the Statistics and Immigration Office suggest that around 8% of births in Niue are from girls and women between 15 and 19.

Maternal mortality rates are relatively low in Niue, and women who foresee complications in pregnancy often travel to New Zealand to give birth. Data on available contraception in Niue is low, but the estimated contraceptive prevalence in Niue is 23%, which is low in comparison to other small Pacific Islands.

The Niue Act of 1966 bans illegally procured abortions, and this legislation remains enforced today. New Zealand's Abortion Legislation Act 2022 decriminalizes abortion, and expands access for citizens of New Zealand. Although all Niue citizens are citizens of New Zealand, Niue has not adopted this legislation into their parliament.

See also

- Niuean women in politics
- Music of Niue
- Demographics of Niue
