= Fata-a-iki =

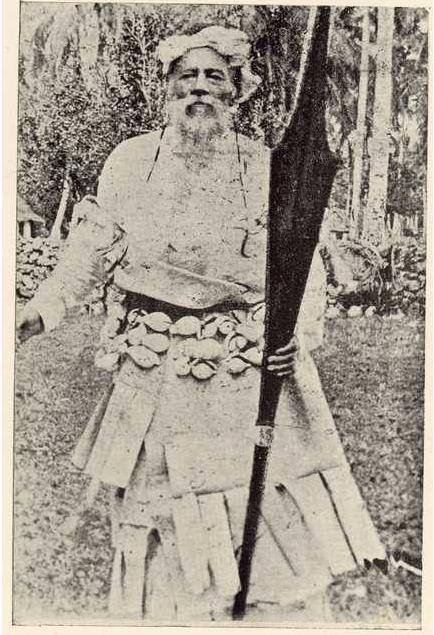
- Photograph of Fata-a-iki, wearing traditional clothing and holding a katoua in his hand

Patu-iki of Niue
- Reign: 1887 - 1896
- Coronation: 21 November 1888
- Predecessor: Tui-toga
- Successor: Togia-Pulu-toaki
- Born: Niue
- Died: 15 December 1896; Niue

Fata-a-iki (died 15 December 1896) was a patu-iki (king) of the Pacific Ocean island of Niue.

== Reign ==
Fata-a-iki ruled from 1887 to 1896. He was the seventh king of the island, and the second to be of the Christian faith. He was anointed on November 21, 1888, although he began ruling the island the previous year, following the death of his predecessor, Tui-toga.

One of his first acts as patu-iki, in 1887, was to write a letter to the British monarch Queen Victoria, requesting that Niue become a protectorate of the British Empire, so as to prevent annexation by another colonial power. His letter read:

"We the chiefs and rulers and governors of Niue-Fekai desire to pray Your Majesty and Your Majesty's Kingdom, if it be your pleasure to stretch out towards us your mighty hand that Niue may hide herself in it and be safe."

The letter was not answered, and King Fata-a-iki repeated his request in 1895, to no avail.
