= Togia-Pulu-toaki =

Togia-Pule-toaki
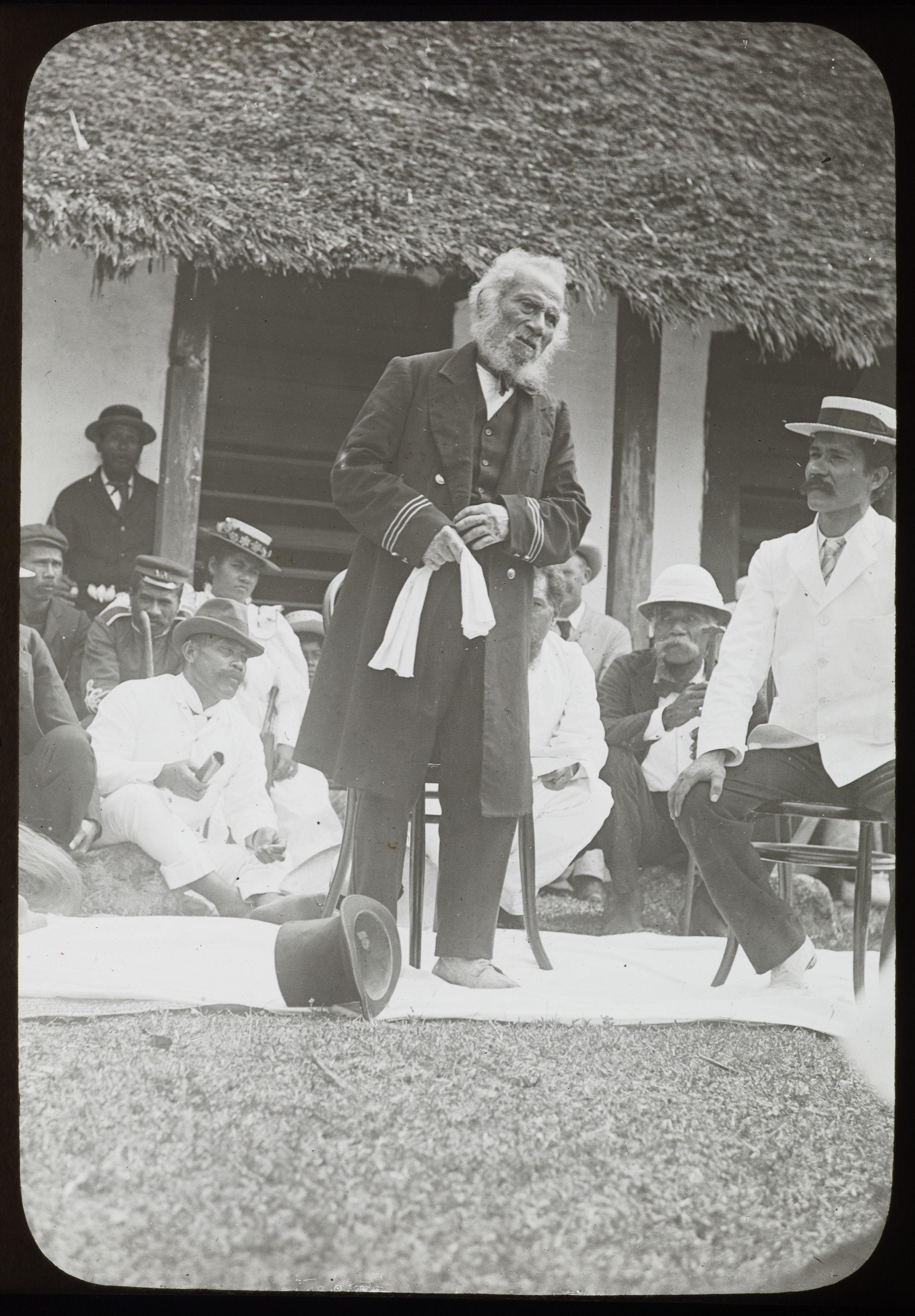

Patu-iki of Niue
- Reign: 1898 - 1917
- Coronation: 30 June 1898
- Predecessor: Fata-a-iki
- Successor: Victoria (as Queen of the United Kingdom)
- Born: 1826; Niue
- Died: 1917 (aged 90–91); Niue

Togia-Pule-toaki, also known as Tongia, (1826 – 1917) was the eighth and final patu-iki of the island of Niue. The position of patu-iki was left vacant for two years after the death of Fata-a-iki in 1896, and Togia-Pule-toaki was appointed after suggesting himself as a candidate. He was coronated on 30 June 1898, and held the title until his death.

== Early life ==
Togia-Pulu-toaki was born in c. 1826.

== Reign ==
Patu-iki Fata-a-iki died on 15 December 1896. An interregnum occurred for two years before a new patu-iki was selected. According to Basil Thomson, Togia-Pulu-toaki waited one year for somebody to suggest an election before suggesting it himself. He nominated himself for the position and continued pressing for the position until the other chiefs relented and gave in to him. His coronation occurred on 30 June 1898.

Niue first sought to become a British protectorate in 1887. Negotiations between Togia-Pulu-toaki and the British resulted in Niue being annexed into the British Empire on 21 April 1900. Percy Smith presented a gold medal from Edward VII to Togia-Pulu-toaki in 1901 on behalf of Governor of New Zealand Uchter Knox, 5th Earl of Ranfurly; similar gold medals were given to the chiefs of New Zealand and the Cook Islands. Niue was placed under Rarotonga for administrative purposes by The Cook and other Islands Government Act, 1901. Niue was given its own administration under a resident commissioner in 1903.

Togia-Pulu-toaki retained his title as patu-iki after Niue's annexation. He died in 1917. He was the last person to serve as patu-iki.

== Works cited ==
=== Books ===
- Loeb, Edwin (1926). History and Traditions of Niue. Bishop Museum.
- Thomson, Basil (1902). Savage Island: An Account of a Sojourn in Niue and Tonga. John Murray.

=== Journals ===
- Isaac, Barbara; Isaac, Gwyneira (2011). "Niue Island and Its People Part II". The Journal of the Polynesian Society. 120 (4). University of Auckland: 369–401. doi:10.2307/41705894. JSTOR 41705894.
- Smith, S. (1902). "Niue Island and Its People Part II". The Journal of the Polynesian Society. 11 (3). University of Auckland: 163–178. doi:10.2307/20701642. JSTOR 20701642.
- Thode-Arora, Hilke (2007). ""How Can We Weave in a Strange Land?" Niuean Weavers in Auckland". Pacific Arts. 5. Pacific Arts Association: 46–59. doi:10.2307/23412049. JSTOR 23412049.
- Thomson, Basil (1901). "Note Upon the Natives of Savage Island, or Niué". Journal of the Royal Anthropological Institute. 31. Royal Anthropological Institute of Great Britain and Ireland: 137–145. doi:10.2307/2842790. JSTOR 2842790.

=== Newspapers ===
- "Local and General News". The New Zealand Herald. 7 August 1901. p. 4 – via Newspapers.com.

=== Web ===
- "Togia, King of Niue, active 1896-1901". National Library of New Zealand. Archived from the original on 16 November 2026.
