= Fishing industry in Niue =

The fishing industry in Niue mainly involves commercial licensing for foreign vessels and tourists engaging in recreational fishing. Most of the inhabitants fish, but for subsistence, and few for their primary income.

== Commercial fishing ==
Commercial tuna fishing vessels target mainly albacore, yellowfin and skipjack. However, there are concerns tuna migration patterns are changing. At the start of 2005, Niue began licensing longline fishing vessels, with production peaking in 2006 and early 2007, but that ended in December 2007.

Niue, as a sparsely populated nation (1564, according to its 2022 census), has few resources to deal with illegal fishing in its vast exclusive economic zone (EEZ) of 317,500 square kilometres (122,600 sq mi). The Niue Nukutuluea Multiple-Use Marine Park, a marine protected area encompassing Niue's territorial waters and its entire EEZ, was established in April 2022 with the goal of ensuring the sustainability of its fisheries.

There are no aquaculture operations.

== Tourism ==
Recreationally, it has been described in fishing media as the "fisherman’s secret paradise". The island has an abundance of fish species, including black, blue and striped marlin, skipjack and yellowfin tuna, red bass, mahi-mahi, sailfish, wahoo and giant trevally. Niue typically attracts around 9000 tourists annually. Taking into account all tourist spending (hotels, restaurants, boat charters, shopping, etc.), tourism injects more money into the economy per kilogram of fish caught than commercial licensing fees.
