= Pasifika Times =

Defunct New Zealand newspaper

The Pasifika Times was an Auckland-based newspaper circulated in Niue, Tonga, and Auckland. It partnered with Niue Economic Review in 2000.

The newspaper ceased publishing in 2002, and editor Peter Moala said the group would continue publishing the Taimi'O Tonga, the Cook Island Star and the Samoa Independent newspapers.
