= Geography of Niue =

Coordinates: 19°02′S 169°52′W

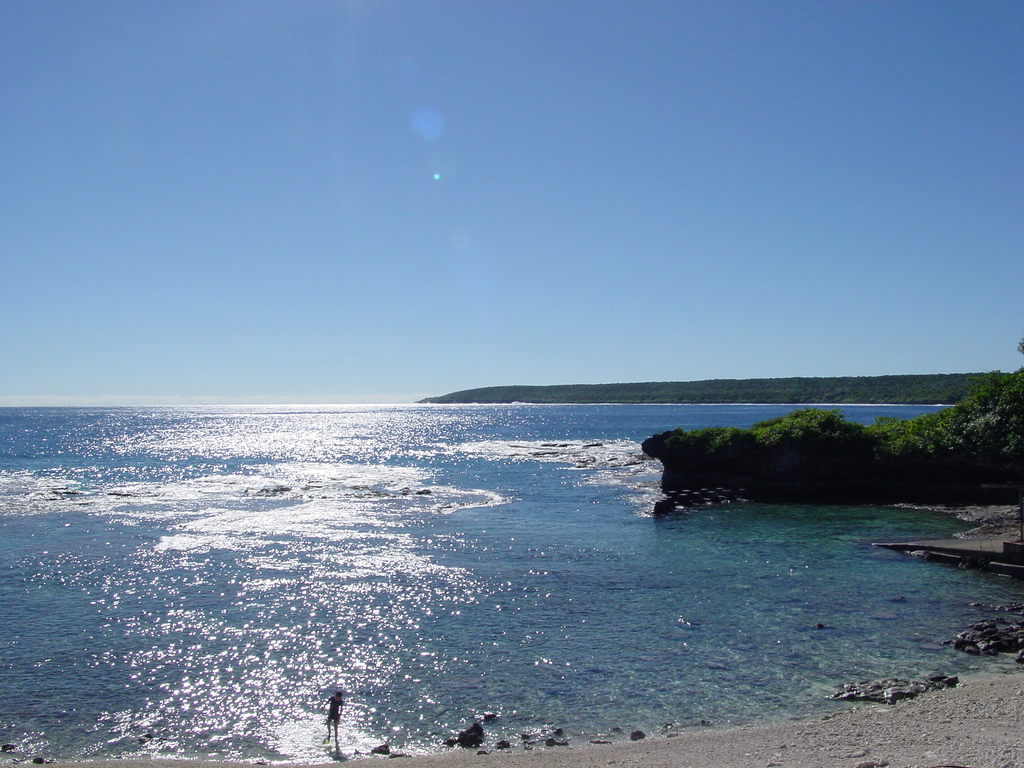
Avatele, Niue

Niue is a small, oval island in the South Pacific Ocean, to the east of Tonga. It has an area of 260 square kilometres, and a coastline of 64 km. It claims an exclusive economic zone of 200 nautical miles, and a territorial sea of 12 nautical miles. It is one of world's largest coral islands.

== Climate ==
Niue's climate is tropical, modified by south-east trade winds. Cyclones pose a natural hazard.

Climate data for Alofi
Month	Jan	Feb	Mar	Apr	May	Jun	Jul	Aug	Sep	Oct	Nov	Dec	Year
Record high °C (°F)	38 (100)	38 (100)	32 (90)	36 (97)	30 (86)	32 (90)	35 (95)	37 (99)	36 (97)	31 (88)	37 (99)	36 (97)	38 (100)
Mean daily maximum °C (°F)	28 (82)	29 (84)	28 (82)	27 (81)	26 (79)	26 (79)	25 (77)	25 (77)	26 (79)	26 (79)	27 (81)	28 (82)	27 (81)
Daily mean °C (°F)	26 (79)	27 (81)	26 (79)	25 (77)	25 (77)	23 (73)	22 (72)	23 (73)	23 (73)	24 (75)	25 (77)	26 (79)	25 (77)
Mean daily minimum °C (°F)	23 (73)	24 (75)	24 (75)	23 (73)	22 (72)	21 (70)	20 (68)	20 (68)	21 (70)	21 (70)	22 (72)	23 (73)	22 (72)
Record low °C (°F)	20 (68)	20 (68)	20 (68)	14 (57)	15 (59)	13 (55)	11 (52)	11 (52)	15 (59)	15 (59)	11 (52)	17 (63)	11 (52)
Average precipitation mm (inches)	261.6 (10.30)	253.6 (9.98)	305.6 (12.03)	202.6 (7.98)	138.2 (5.44)	88.9 (3.50)	96.4 (3.80)	105.8 (4.17)	102.4 (4.03)	123.8 (4.87)	145.5 (5.73)	196.2 (7.72)	2,018.4 (79.46)
Source: Weatherbase

== Terrain ==
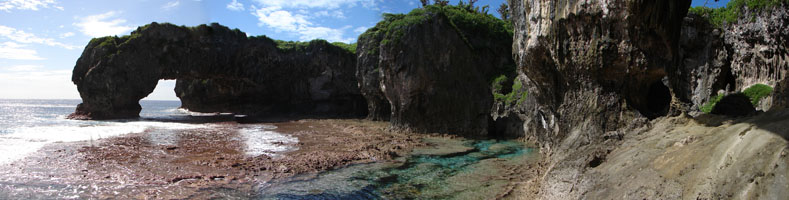
Talava arches, Niue

The terrain consists of steep coastal cliffs made from limestone and a central plateau. Scenic features on the northern coast are the Talava Arches. The three sea arches are accessible via a trail. Further west on the coast the user will encounter Avaiki Cave.

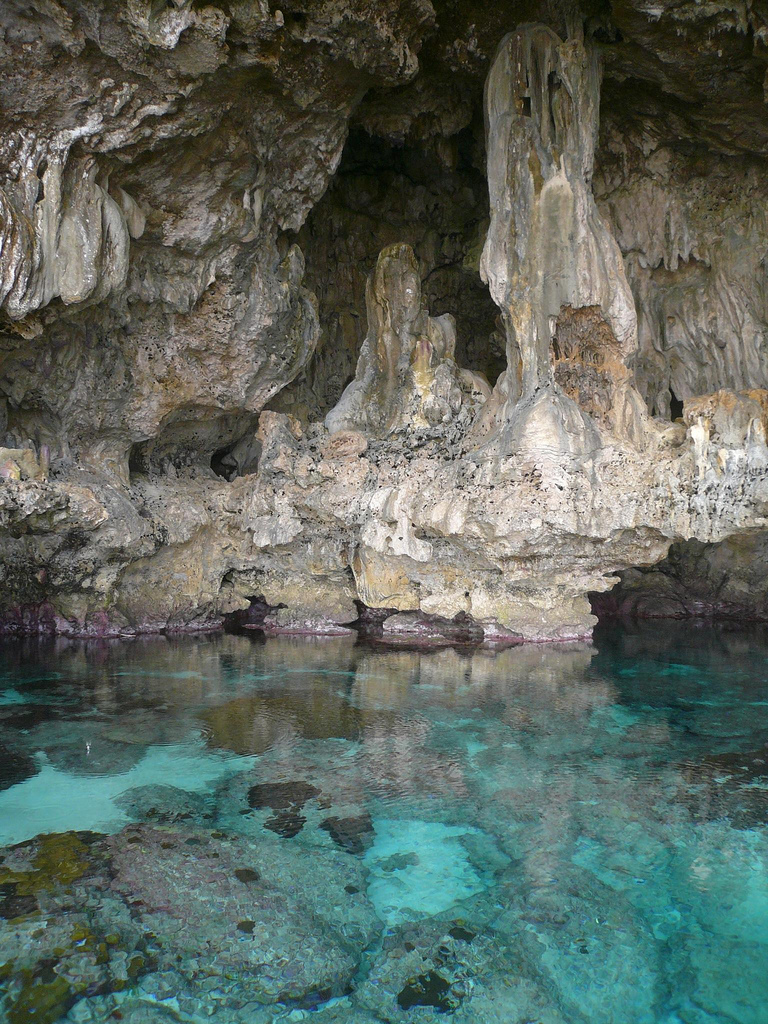
Avaiki Cave

The coastline also includes numerous coastal caverns including Ana, Togo, and Vaikona. The lowest point is at sea level, and the highest is an unnamed point near Mutalau settlement, at 68 m.

== Natural resources ==
The island's natural resources are fish and arable land. Land use in 1993 was as in the following table:

Land use
Use	Percentage of area
arable land	19
permanent crops	8
permanent pastures	4
forests and woodland	19
other	50

== Environmental issues ==
A current environmental issue is increasing attention to conservationist practices to counter loss of soil fertility from traditional slash-and-burn agriculture. Niue is a party to the following international agreements regarding the environment: Biodiversity, Climate Change-Kyoto Protocol, Desertification. Niue has signed but not ratified the Law of the Sea agreement.

== Boundaries ==
Niue has signed a treaty with the United States in which the parties delimited the east–west maritime boundary between Niue and American Samoa. Niue is south of American Samoa.

== Extreme points ==
This is a list of the extreme points of Niue, the points that are farther north, south, east or west than any other location.

- Northernmost point – unnamed headland north-west of Uluvehi
- Easternmost point – unnamed headland south-east of Liku
- Southernmost point – Limufuafua Point
- Westernmost point - Halagigie Point
