= List of Niuean monarchs =

King of New Zealand
- Te Kīngi o Aotearoa (Māori)
- Coats of arms of New Zealand, the Cook Islands and Niue

Incumbent
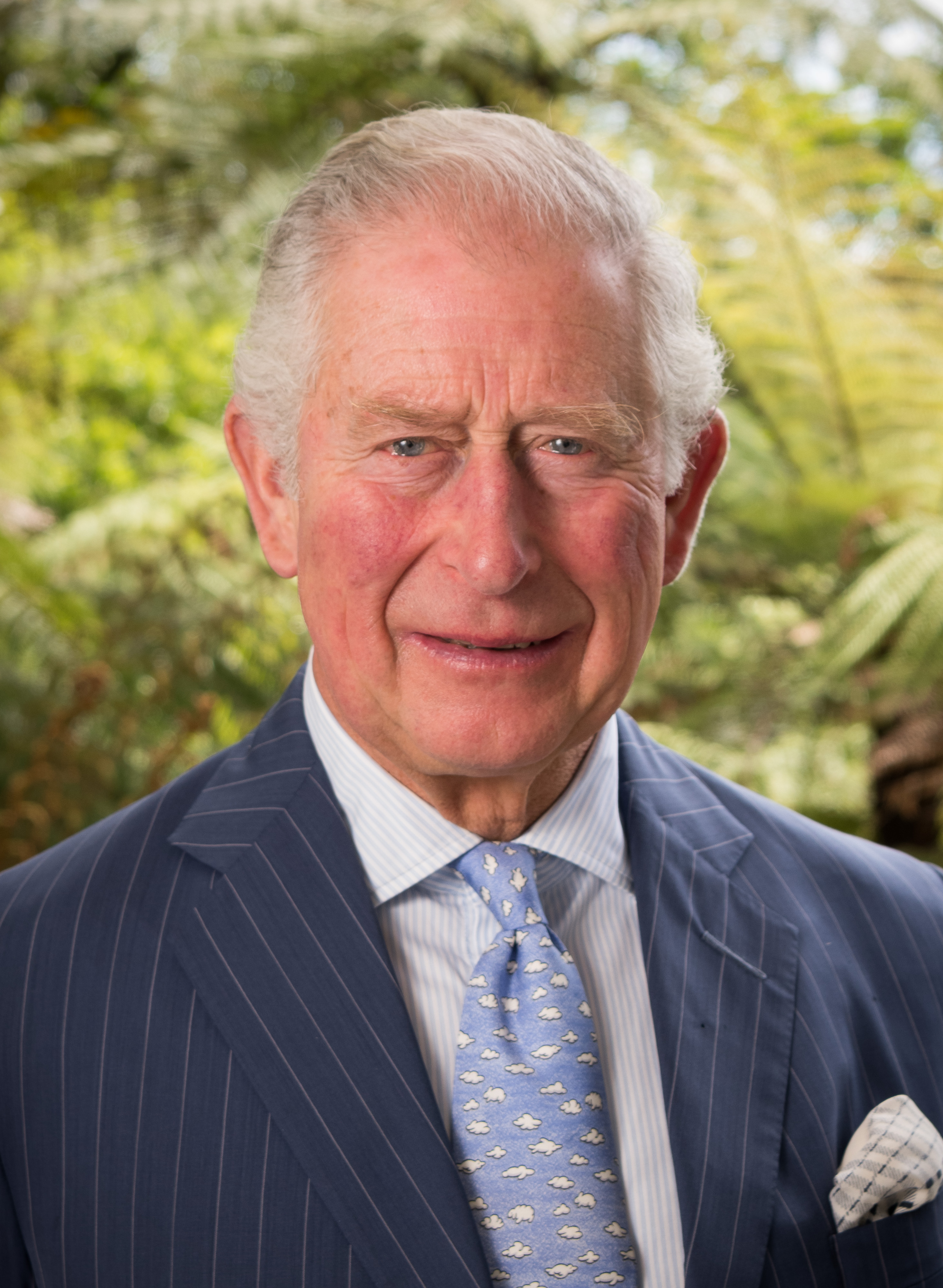
- Charles III; Tiāre te Tuatoru (Māori) since 8 September 2022

Details
- Style: His Majesty (Māori: Te Arikinui)
- Heir apparent: William, Prince of Wales

This is a list of monarchs who have reigned over the Pacific island of Niue. The island today is a self-governing territory in free association with New Zealand, and recognises the Sovereign in Right of New Zealand, King Charles III, as the head of state. Before this, however, the island previously had an indigenous monarchy, established around the beginning of the 18th century.

Before that time, there appears to have been no national government or national leader in Niue. Chiefs and heads of family exercised authority over segments of the population. Around 1700, the concept and practice of kingship appears to have been introduced through contact with Samoa or Tonga. From then on, a succession of patu-iki (kings) ruled the island, the first of whom was Puni-mata. The monarch was non-hereditary; patu-iki were reportedly elected by the Niuean population, with the candidates being issued from influential families. As described by Percy Smith in 1903, Niue appears therefore to have been a democratic elective monarchy.

== List of patu-iki ==
The following is a list of the patu-iki of Niue:

Portrait	Name (Birth–Death)	Reign		Notes
Portrait	Name (Birth–Death)	Start	End	Notes
	Tihamau			
	Tepunua Mutalau			
	Leivalu			
	Hetalangi			
	Fakahinaiki			
	Punimata	c. 1700		His death, of old age, was followed by an interregnum of significant but indeterminate length.
	Ihunga			
	Patuavalu			He was nominated for kingship by the population's elected choice, Tagelagi, who declined the position and opted instead to be Patuavalu's lifelong bodyguard. Patuavalu died of old age.
	Galiga, also known as Galiaga-a-Iki and Galiaga of Palūki			This patu-iki was murdered by a person called Tikomata. Following his death, Fakana-iki and Hetalaga vied to replace him, but failed to secure the approval of the population. Foki-mata eventually became the fourth patu-iki instead. He was the last king elected in times of peace.
	Fokimata (–1874?)		1874?	
	Pakieto (–1875?)	1874?	1875?	He was patu-iki for only a year. Following his death, a war of succession occurred. He was one of the Tama-lagau people.
Interregnum (–2 Mar 1876)
	Mataio Tuitoga, also known as Ta-tagata (–13 June 1887)	2 March 1876	13 July 1887	The first christian king of Niue.
	Fata-a-iki (–1896)	1887 (de facto); 21 November 1888 (de jure)	15 December 1896	The second christian Niuean monarch. One of his first acts as patu-iki in 1877 was to send a letter to Queen Victoria, requesting that Niue be made a protectorate of the British Empire, to protect the island from other imperial powers, although his letter (and another sent in 1895) received no replies.
	Togia-Pulu-toaki	1896 (de facto); 30 June 1898 (de jure)	17 February 1917	He was the king who finally ceded Niue to the British Empire on 21 April 1900, and who welcomed a Resident representative of the imperial government on Niue on 11 September 1901. Togia-Pulu-toaki remained patu-iki in 1903, when Niuē-fekai (or Savage) Island and its People was published. The date of his death, and whether or not he was succeeded, remains unclear.

== Imperial rule and free association ==
From 1900 to 1901, Niue was ruled by the United Kingdom. In 1901, the island was annexed by New Zealand, which administered it in the name of the British Empire. On 26 September 1907, New Zealand attained the status of dominion, becoming the Dominion of New Zealand, and the British monarch from then on reigned over Niue in his or her capacity as monarch of New Zealand. Elizabeth II was the first monarch to be explicitly titled Queen of New Zealand, however, in 1952. Today, Niue is part of the Realm of New Zealand, the successor political entity to the dominion.

=== List of British monarchs reigning over Niue ===
Portrait	Regnal name (Birth–Death)	Reign		Full name	Consort	House
Portrait	Regnal name (Birth–Death)	Start	End	Full name	Consort	House
	Victoria (1819–1901)	21 April 1900 (de facto)	22 January 1901	Alexandrina Victoria	Widowed	Hanover
	Edward VII (1841–1910)	22 January 1901	26 September 1907	Albert Edward	Alexandra of Denmark	Saxe-Coburg and Gotha

=== List of New Zealand monarchs reigning over Niue ===
Portrait	Regnal name (Birth–Death)	Reign		Full name	Consort	House
Portrait	Regnal name (Birth–Death)	Start	End	Full name	Consort	House
As a colony of New Zealand
	Edward VII (1841–1910)	26 September 1907	6 May 1910	Albert Edward	Alexandra of Denmark	Saxe-Coburg and Gotha
	George V (1865–1936)	6 May 1910	20 January 1936	George Frederick Ernest Albert	Mary of Teck	Windsor (Note: Saxe-Coburg and Gotha until 1917, and Windsor thereafter.)
	Edward VIII (1894–1972)	20 January 1936	11 December 1936	Edward Albert Christian George Andrew Patrick David	None	Windsor
	George VI (1895–1952)	11 December 1936	6 February 1952	Albert Frederick Arthur George	Elizabeth Bowes-Lyon	Windsor
	Elizabeth II (1926–2022)	6 February 1952	19 October 1974	Elizabeth Alexandra Mary	Philip Mountbatten	Windsor
As a self-governing country
	Elizabeth II (1926–2022)	19 October 1974	8 September 2022	Elizabeth Alexandra Mary	Philip Mountbatten	Windsor
	Elizabeth II (1926–2022)	Premiers: Sir Robert Rex, Young Vivian, Frank Lui, Sani Lakatani, Young Vivian, Sir Toke Talagi, Dalton Tagelagi				
	Charles III (born 1948)	8 September 2022	present	Charles Philip Arthur George	Camilla Shand	Windsor
	Charles III (born 1948)	Premiers / Prime Ministers (since 2024): Dalton Tagelagi				

== See also ==
- Monarchy in the Cook Islands
- Monarchy of the United Kingdom

== Sources ==
- S. Percy Smith, Niuē-fekai (or Savage) Island and its People, 1903, pp. 36–44
