= Music of Niue =

The music of Niue has a long history. Niue is a Polynesian island in the South Pacific. Though independent, it is in free association with New Zealand.

== History ==
The Niue culture and tradition is also rich in music. However, most of the very traditional Niuean songs are sung without the use of any musical instruments. The only instrument that is used for the very traditional dances is a wooden drum known in Niuean as palau or nafa, made out of a carved trunk of the selie tree. The use of the instrument is mainly to provide a beat for the dances.

=== Tā Mē ===
The Tā Mē is a traditional group performance, celebrating significant occasions such as, the opening of a new building or facility, weddings, birthdays, launches, milestones and fundraising events. It involves both men and women singing and dancing to Niuean songs. This is often accompanied by musical instruments like the guitar, ukulele and sometimes a traditionally-crafted bass drum.

Typically, there are multiple items during a Tā Mē and the dance actions are generally choreographed to match the words of the songs. The songs performed often follow familiar Niuean and Pacific melodies, and some lyrics are customised to fit the occasion.

Women usually perform seated, facing the audience, while the men perform while standing behind them. These positions are not a reflection of social status, as men and women hold equal standing in Niuean culture.

=== Today ===
As Niue modernized, its music began to be influenced by other cultures. Manaia Studio and the Niue Broadcasting Corporation are the only recording studios on the island. There are many Niue artists who have made it to the top.

Pauly Fuemana of OMC (Otara's Millionaires Club) is half Niuean and half Māori, and became the first New Zealander to reach top of the charts in 12 countries with his hit "How Bizarre". The record sold over three million albums which made him the most successful Pacific music artist ever. The Fuemana Family is the most successful Pacific family with over 12 NZ music awards between.

Musician Che Fu is very popular, and has won several Tui Awards, a New Zealand music award. This is an enormous achievement for a country with only a few thousand people, as other countries bigger than Niue have yet to reach those heights conquered by these Niuean artists. His father, Tigilau Ness, is also a highly regarded artist who received a Lifetime Achievement Award at the 2009 Pacific Music Awards.

The Kilakokonut Krew group and record label is also made up of Niuean artists Vela Manusaute and Glen Jackson. The migration of Niueans to New Zealand also make greater influences on Niuean music. There are up-and-coming artists, such as MC Kava, who now sing in contemporary styles of music like rap, hip-hop and reggae.

There are also many Niuean artists who have produced records in Niuean language. Fuata Muta was the first Niuean group to play and record their own music albums. From the actual playing of the instruments to the engineering and mixing the songs at one of Sydney's largest recording studios in 1985 and 1986. Church choirs are also common. However, they sing traditional hymns with no instrumental accompaniment at all.

Three Niuean LPs have been released on vinyl which were pressed when Niueans travelled for the South Pacific Arts Festivals in Suva & Rotorua. Many Niuean cassette tapes and CDs have been produced and made over the years in Australia, New Zealand and Niue.

Victa Talima released a cassette tape in Sydney, Australia. It was titled "Neva" and released in 1997. It included his cult classic remake of Titania Talagi's hit "Koe Fisi Siale" and is popular among Niueans in the world. He released two CDs, one called "Hihina Mata" (2000) and "Vela" (2006) to moderate success with some popular tunes. His song "Tolitoli" from the Hihina Mata album was one of the first Niuean songs to be banned from the Niuean radio station BCN, for its explicit lyrics.

Niue had a recording studio called Manaia Studios, which produced a few artists famous to Niueans. This included: the Malakava Sisters (daughters of Titania and Matalose Talagi), who sang the cult classic "Tama Afine Niue" and covered popular hits "Koe Auro Moe Alio"; Teuila and Frances (sung "Fakatai a Susana"); Sionepaea Kumitau (sung "Haku Loto Paiki" and "Fano Au He Tau"); Bommo & Co (Kimray Vaha); Falala Niue (a compilation of songs for the 1999 Miss Niue pageant, including the popular hit "Alito Mata He Fuata". This was sung by Coral Pasisi & Jackson Hekesi. Composed for Miss Fiafia Rex, written by Tagaloa Rex Cooper.); "Falala Mai Fineone" sung by the Hakupu Youth; and Tomanogi (husband and wife duo Tom and Ligimanogi Misikea, composer of the popular Huvalu Forest Conservation party song "Ta Kalali").

Ta Kalali has been covered a few times. Jolly Talima & The Talima Band covered this song for the Çyclone Heta album. Jackson Hekesi (J'Love) covered this song for his 'Blast from the Past' album.

Napoleon Manetoa & The Lost Liku Lovers, released the CD titled 'Neva'. The album contained many known hits and a few new songs never heard before. It included the tracks Pa pa Seliga, Ko E Kufani, Kua Amanaki and many more.

Other Niuean groups or artists to release music are Kuma Mo Feke, Mefi Fifita, Malcolm Lakatani, Sheelagh Cooper, James Viliua, Tina Tuibenau, Brad Etuata, Annette Posimani, Jayjay Poumale.

Hools released music under the artist name "Tommy Nee", before changing his name. Hools launched his own music platform, Banana Boat Records (BBR) in 2024.
