= Human rights in Niue =

Niue is a country in the South Pacific Ocean with an estimated population of 1,190. Since 1974, it has been self-governing in free association with New Zealand. Niue controls its own internal affairs, while New Zealand retains responsibility for its defence and external relations and is required to provide necessary economic and administrative assistance.

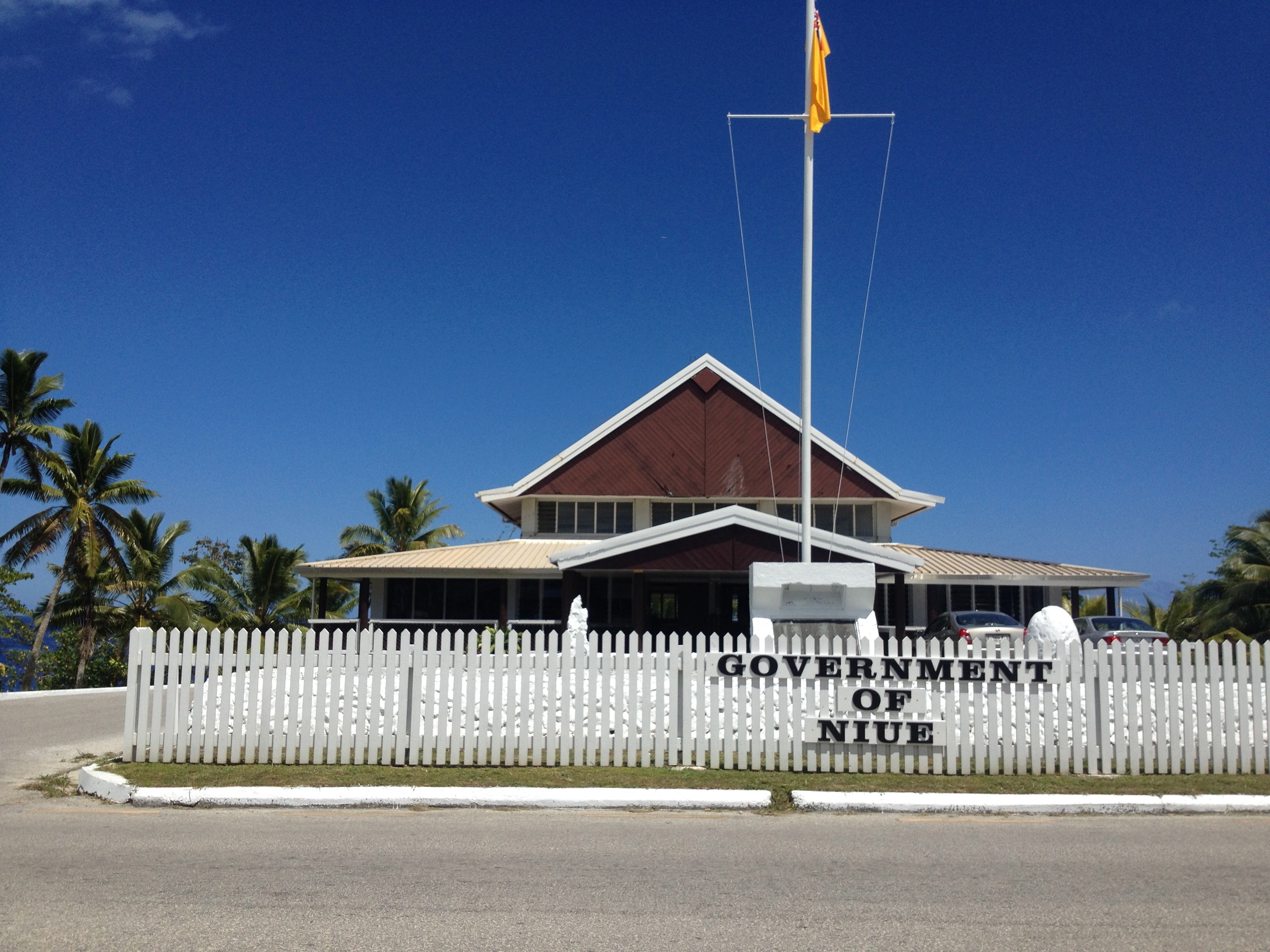
The Government of Niue

== Legal framework ==
=== International obligations ===
During recent consultations, Niue developed Terms of Reference for a Human Rights Committee which will be responsible for examining the country's human rights obligations arising from international law.

Niue is party to treaties signed and ratified by New Zealand prior to 1988, including the following:

- International Covenant on Civil and Political Rights (ICCPR)
- International Covenant on Economic, Social and Cultural Rights (ICESCR)
- International Convention on the Elimination of All Forms of Racial Discrimination (CERD)
- Convention on the Elimination of All Forms of Discrimination against Women (CEDAW)

In 1988, New Zealand submitted a Declaration to the United Nations, stating that treaty obligations it subsequently entered into were to no longer bind Niue. Noting that it had become a member of the World Health Organization (WHO) and the United Nations Educational, Scientific and Cultural Organization (UNESCO), the Secretary-General recognised Niue's capacity to enter into international treaties in 1994. The following year, Niue acceded to the Convention on the Rights of the Child (CRC).

As a self-governing state, it is responsible for producing its own reports on measures adopted to give effect to international treaties. Despite offers of assistance from New Zealand, Niue has experienced difficulty in doing so due to its small population and a shortage of resources and expertise. Its initial report under the Convention on the Rights of the Child was due in 1998, but not submitted until 2010.

Niue is not subject to the Universal Periodic Review process as it is not a member state of the United Nations.

=== Constitution ===
The Niue Constitution Act 1974 sets out provisions for Niue's self-government. The Constitution of Niue, contained in Schedules 1 (Niuean) and 2 (English), is supreme law. It prescribes the powers and functions of the executive, legislative and judicial branches of Government. Aside from the right to vote, it does not provide for any fundamental rights.

Previously, Article 31 of Schedule 2 set out special rules for proposed legislation which could impact upon human rights. This required the Chief Justice to be invited to comment on the legal, constitutional, and policy issues where a Bill or proposed amendment affected such matters as criminal procedure, definitions of criminal offences, marriage, the law of evidence, and extradition. This Article was repealed by the Constitution Amendment (No 1) Act 1992.

In 1991, a Committee considered the inclusion of specific human rights guarantees in the Constitution in the form of a Bill of Rights, but ultimately rejected this idea.

=== Legislation applicable to Niue ===
Legislation that is in force in Niue today consists of:

- New Zealand legislation that existed on Constitution Day (19 October 1974) which has not subsequently been repealed or amended by the Niue Assembly
- Legislation passed by the Niue Assembly in accordance with the Niue Constitution Act 1974
- New Zealand legislation passed after Constitution Day which is requested by the Niue Assembly to extend to Niue

Core New Zealand human rights enactments, such as the New Zealand Bill of Rights Act 1990 and the Human Rights Act 1993, do not apply in Niue.

== Human rights issues ==
=== Right to life ===
The death penalty has been abolished in Niue.

=== Electoral rights ===
The Niue Assembly has the power to make laws for the "peace, order and good government" of Niue. It has twenty members, elected under a system of universal suffrage, and a Speaker. Elections occur every three years.

A person is not qualified to be registered as an elector if he or she:

- Does not meet residency requirements of section 12 of the Niue Assembly Act 1966;
- Is of unsound mind;
- Is under the age of 18; or
- Has been convicted in Niue or any Commonwealth country of an offence punishable by death or imprisonment of one year or more, and has not received a pardon or undergone the sentence or punishment.

=== Access to justice ===
Issues with access to justice have arisen due to a shortage of persons with the relevant skills and knowledge. There is no system of legal aid, and a survey carried out in 2011 found there were only six lawyers in Niue. Niue is a member of the Pacific Judicial Development Programme, which aims to improve the operation of the justice system in the Pacific region by providing training and support.

=== Freedom of religion ===
There are no legislative restrictions on religious belief or practice, however the Constitution does not guarantee freedom of religion, nor is there any legislation which prohibits discrimination on the grounds of religion. The majority of Niueans are Christian, and regard Sunday as a day of rest. Some laws, such as bans on fishing and exhibiting films on Sundays, reflect this.

=== Freedom of expression ===
While the Constitution does not expressly guarantee freedom of expression, there are few restrictions on what can be said or published in Niue. Inciting racial disharmony is an imprisonable offence. Persons who make statements which constitute libel or slander are also liable to imprisonment.

=== Labour law ===
The Government is the main employer in Niue. Conditions of employment, entitlement to leave, and processes for promotions and disciplinary action in the public sector are laid down by the Public Service Regulations 2004. Retirement is compulsory for permanent employees in the public service upon reaching the age of 55. There is no labour law for workers employed in the private sector.

=== Racial discrimination ===
It is unlawful to refuse access to public places, vehicles and facilities, provision of goods or services, employment, or access to land and housing on the basis of colour, race, or ethnic or national origins. Persons who believe themselves to be aggrieved by these provisions are entitled to bring civil proceedings in court. Agreements in relation to real property are void to the extent that they prohibit or restrict dealings by reason of the colour, race or ethnic origins of an individual or their family. Persons who incite racial disharmony through the use of threatening or abusive words are liable to imprisonment.

=== Women's rights ===
Although there is no law prohibiting discrimination on the grounds of sex or gender, Niue generally "offer[s] women equality under the law". It is on track to meet its Millennium Development Goals of 2015 in relation to promoting gender equality and empowering women. There have been no reports of maternal deaths since 1980, gender parity has been achieved in primary and tertiary education, and there is high participation of women in government.

There are, however, areas of concern. Domestic violence is "pervasive" and tends to be managed by families themselves rather the authorities. There is presently no legislation which deals specifically with this issue, although work is under way on a Family Protection Bill which is expected to provide measures for the punishment of perpetrators and the protection of victims of domestic violence.

Marital rape is not a criminal offence in Niue. A man cannot be convicted of the rape or attempted rape of his wife unless a decree nisi of divorce, decree of nullity, judicial separation, or separation order was in place at the time of the act. Sexual violence against girls is addressed in the Niue Act 1966, which provides that those who have or attempt sexual intercourse with a girl under 15 are liable to terms of imprisonment. Despite this, sexual assault on minors has been reported as occurring “regularly”. Cultural and societal beliefs have the effect of inhibiting the reporting of these offences. Where complaints are lodged, they are frequently subsequently withdrawn or dropped. The introduction of a mandatory reporting obligation on figures of authority, and a “no-drop” policy ensuring cases are not closed prematurely have been touted as possible solutions.

Due to a lack of reproductive health education and the societal attitude that all children are "blessings and gifts from God", teen pregnancy is common. Abortion is not currently available in Niue, and its legality is unclear. The Niue Act 1966 provides that it is an offence to “unlawfully procure” or administer an abortion, which suggests that some abortions may be lawful. In particular, the common law defence of necessity could be applicable in the event of endangerment to a woman’s life or health. This remains untested in Court.

It is an offence to be the keeper of a brothel in Niue, as was being a prostitute. The minimum age of marriage for females in Niue is 15. The United Nations Committee on the Rights of the Child has recommended raising this to 18, to match the minimum age for males.

=== LGBT rights ===
Same-sex relationships have been identified by Niue as an issue which “may be the subject of reform” in the coming years.

Current Niue law does not make any specific reference to those who identify as lesbian, gay, bisexual or transgender. Same-sex marriage is not recognised and there is no legislation prohibiting discrimination on the basis of sexual orientation or gender identity. Sexual activity between males was decriminalized in June 2024, female same-sex activity was never criminalized.

There is no provision for a change of sex on official documents under the Births and Deaths Registration Regulations 1984.

=== Children's rights ===
The definition of a child varies greatly under Niue law. Individuals may sue and be sued in infancy, are entitled to drive at age 14, may purchase liquor at 18, and can be adopted up to age 21. Those under 18 are prohibited from permanent employment in the public service, however there is no minimum age to undertake other work. As Niue has no labour law for those employed in the private sector, children who take on employment outside of the public service have no legal protection from poor working conditions or exploitation.

Enrolment and attendance at a school is compulsory for children between the ages of 5 and 16. All education provided by Government schools is free of charge. It is the duty of parents to ensure their child of school age is enrolled and attends school, and failure to do so without excuse or exemption is an offence. In 2011, the enrolment rate of primary and secondary school aged children was 100%.

The use of corporal punishment at school is not expressly prohibited by law. Legislation relating to cruel treatment and bodily harm is not interpreted as outlawing corporal punishment. Acceptance of corporal punishment in the home is "near universal".

=== Rights of persons with disabilities ===
Legislation requires that children with physical or mental disabilities be educated at a "special school" or institution, however Niue has no teachers with training in special education. Also of concern is reference in the Niue Act 1966 to women and girls who are "idiots, imbeciles or of unsound mind", and the lower criminal sanction for those who sexually offend against such individuals.

Niue adopted a National Policy on Disability in 2011.
