= Reef Shipping =

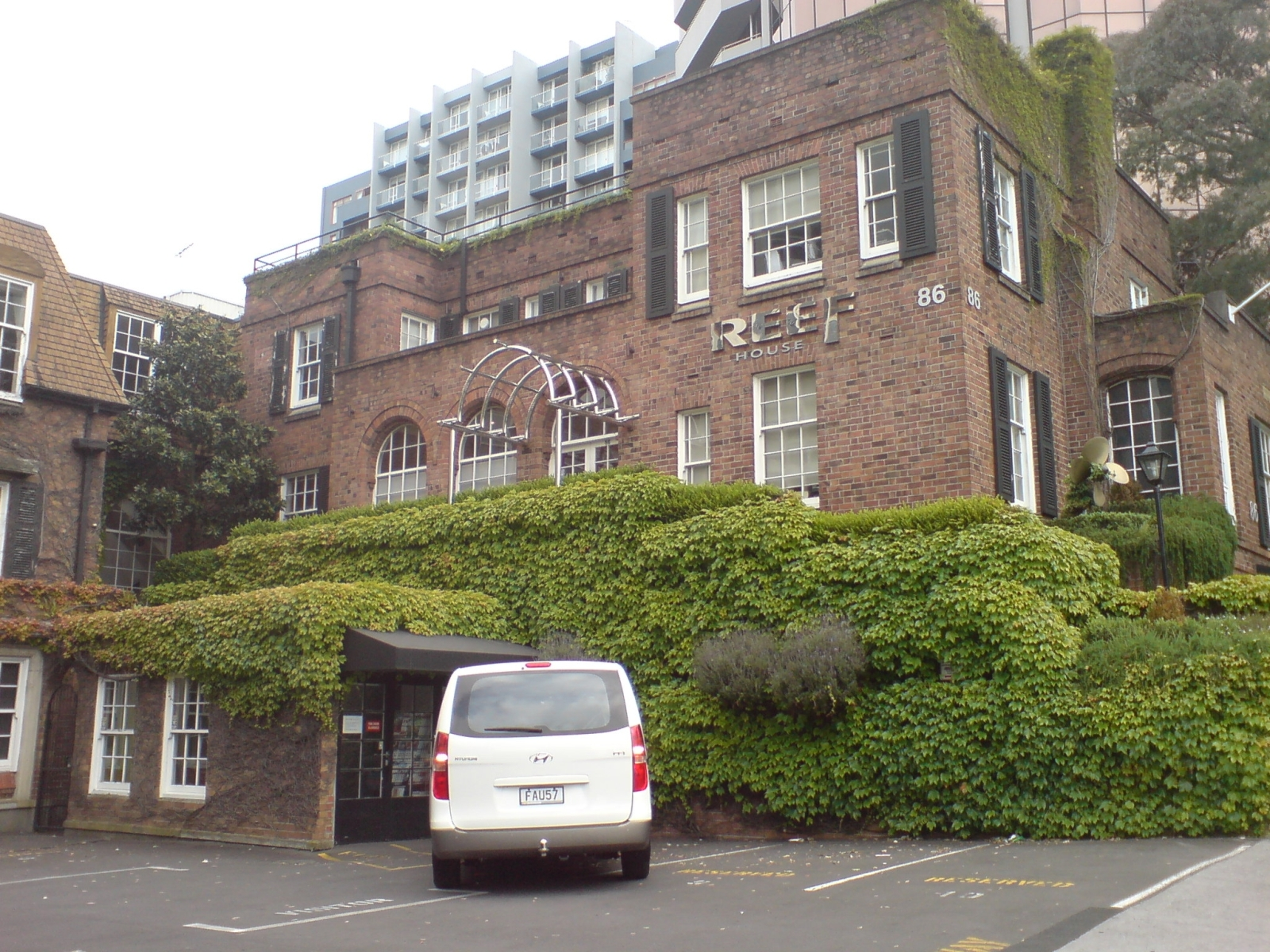
The headquarters of the company in Auckland.

Reef Shipping was an ocean shipping company operating in Polynesia, especially between Asia, Australia and New Zealand and the islands. It has existed for over forty years, as of the late 2000s. The company is headquartered in Auckland, New Zealand.

In the 2000s, the company also operated concerns like a fish processing plant, with associated fishing vessels and a small transport airline in Niue. However, this venture later closed again, and shipping services to Niue were for some time reduced to less than one vessel a month.

Until the mid-2000s, the company also provided services to the Chatham Islands, but these were cancelled due to issues with commercial viability.

Reef Shipping went into receivership in November 2012 and was purchased by Matson. The primary assets transferred included four vessels and about 1500 pieces of container equipment.
