= Patu-iki =

Niuean title

Patu-iki ("chief of chiefs") was the title that was given to the leader of the Pacific Ocean island of Niue. The position was not hereditary, and was elected by the people from among the heads of influential families. John Macmillan Brown reported it as being "purely nominal", with no real power. The first Patu-Iki was Puni-mata in around 1700, and the last was Togia-Pulu-toaki, who ceded Niue to the British Crown in 1900.

The concept of kingship in Niue may have arisen due to increased contact with the monarchial systems in place in Samoa and Tonga.

== See also ==
- List of Niuean monarchs
