= Pasture wedge graph =

Graphical farm management tool

A pasture wedge graph or feed wedge is a farm management tool used by dairy farmers for the purposes of managing pasture. It takes the form of a bar graph, that shows the amount of feed available in a pasture over time, and is therefore shaped as a declining wedge.

Rotational grazing systems have developed on temperate pastures consisting of perennial ryegrass and white clover. The pre-grazing pasture mass and the post-grazing residual (1500 kg/DM/ha) are critical decisions the dairy farmer has to make every day. The development of the 'Rising Plate Meter' has enabled the pre-grazing and post-grazing pasture masses to be measured.· Pasture eaten, measured as megajoules of metabolisable energy per hectare (MJME/ha) or as kilograms of dry matter (kg DM/ha), is a key driver of profit for all farm systems i.e. pasture grown x pasture utilisation.

== History and development ==
Tom Phillips (New Zealand Dairy Board consulting officer, Matamata, New Zealand, 1976) developed the original concept of the pasture wedge graph used worldwide by pasture based dairy farmers. The original goal of the NZ Dairy Board consulting officer team (Sir Arthur Ward) was to assist New Zealand dairy farmers improve profitability by improving pasture grazing management and the genetic quality of the herd. In 1950-2000 the NZ dairy industry was based on low-input, pasture-based, spring calving systems. Consulting officers worked primarily with dairy farmers in Discussion Groups. Tom Phillips was a consulting officer from 1976 to 1983 (Waikato/Bay of Plenty area) based in Matamata. The legacy of this on farm collaboration in 1976 is that the concept of the pasture wedge graph is used today by pasture based/grazing dairy farmers throughout the world. It has evolved into an online predictive computerized tool for tactical farm management decision making regarding grazing management.

== Development in New Zealand ==
Much of the basic grazing management in New Zealand was developed from the original work of André Voisin (1957) in Normandy, France on the theory of rotational grazing. Decades of farmlet trials at Ruakura comparing controlled grazing (rotational grazing) vs uncontrolled (set stocking) led by McMeekan created multi-year farm systems experimentation into core fundamentals of grazing management with dairy cows. Temperate permanent pastures were found to respond best to a hard grazing (post grazing residual of 1500kgs DM/ha) and then being spelled before being hard grazed again. The grazing interval depended on the time of year and the speed of the regrowth after grazing. Each grazing impacted on the subsequent quality of the pasture grown The original pasture wedge graph concept attempted to include a number of rotational grazing concepts. e.g. Graze the longer pasture first, don't let the longest pasture exceed 15–25 cm, allocated pasture area so that the dairy cows graze to a residual of 1500kgs DM/ha (2–4 cm) within a single grazing i.e. 12 or 24 hrs. Maintain pasture in a leafy stage of growth so that the quality is high (high energy & protein). In this way both perennial ryegrass and white clover thrive and the cows achieve the maximum pasture intake. Pasture management has a demand (cow intake X pasture area) and a supply (available pasture) component. In 2005 Adrian Van Bysterveldt made a mathematical assessment of the required pasture demand for the pasture wedge graph. This effectively put numbers on the graph and enabled dairy farmers to calculate a demand line (for the grazing herd) and provide measurements of the amount of pasture available to be grazed (supply) on the farm. A simple spreadsheet could now create a graph for the farmer to allow informed decisions to be made, particularly about the grazing interval or rotation length.

- By rotational grazing, a “feed wedge” is built up ahead of the stock, and it’s easy to see which paddocks are growing the most feed and can be grazed next.
- It’s also easy to see how the pastures are growing, so decisions on the rotation length become easier.

Grazing management has moved from allocating a certain amount of pasture area each day to a better understanding of the needs of the pasture plant and the interaction between the animal and the plant.

The Rising Plate Meter was designed in New Zealand to measure both height & density of perennial ryegrass and white clover pastures under dairying.
