= Elizabeth Gregory =

University professor of home science

Elizabeth Gregory OBE (4 March 1901 – 22 October 1983) was a New Zealand university professor of home science. She was born in Dunedin, New Zealand, on 4 March 1901.

In 1953, Gregory was awarded the Queen Elizabeth II Coronation Medal. In the 1961 New Year Honours, she was appointed an Officer of the Order of the British Empire.

One of Gregory's students was professor of education, Barbara Calvert.

== Selected works ==
- Good nutrition : principles and menus, 1940
- A study of some New Zealand dietaries, 1934
- A study of fat metabolism with special reference to nutrition on diets devoid of fat, 1932

== Legacy ==
- Elizabeth Gregory Scholarship at University of Otago
