= New Zealand Aerial Mapping =

Aerial Surveying company in New Zealand

New Zealand Aerial Mapping Ltd
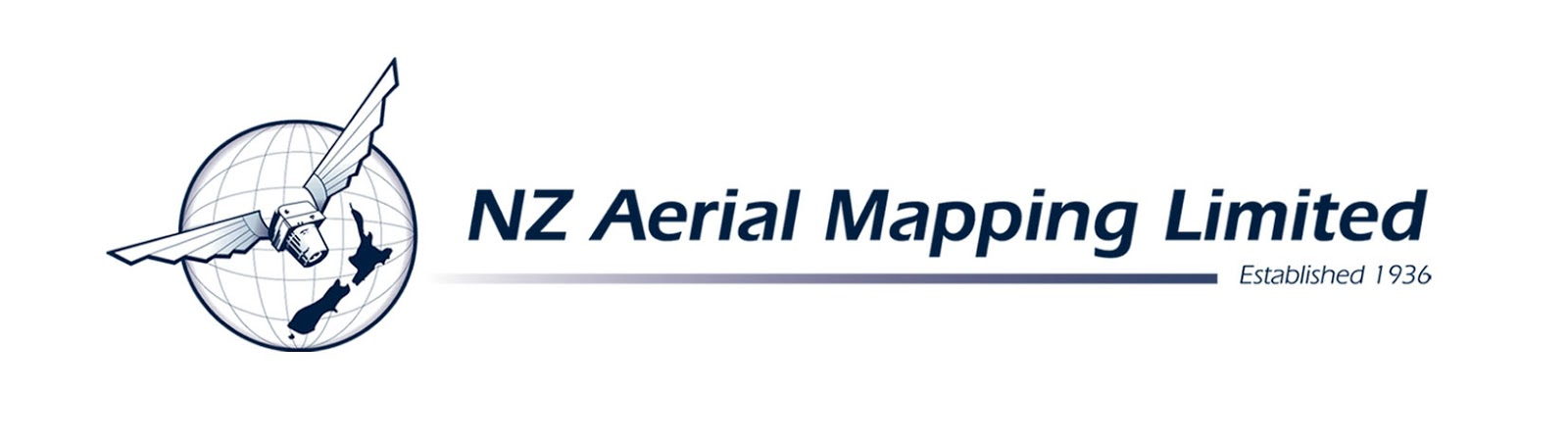
- Industry: Aerial Mapping and Surveying
- Founded: 1936; 90 years ago
- Founder: Piet van Asch
- Defunct: 2014
- Headquarters: Hastings, New Zealand

New Zealand Aerial Mapping Ltd (NZAM) was an aerial surveying company in New Zealand from 1936 to 2014. Founded by aviator Piet Van Asch, NZAM primarily operated out of Bridge Pa Aerodrome, Hastings. NZAM attained the Government License to survey in 1937 and held this license for 78 years. The company was sold in 2005 and went into liquidation in 2014.

== Background ==
=== History of aerial mapping in New Zealand ===
Prior to NZAM, most aerial surveying of New Zealand was undertaken by the Royal New Zealand Air Force (then the New Zealand Permanent Air Force). This was the common international approach, as this stemmed from the military's desire for knowledge of land and its features of defence and reconnaissance.

In 1935, the New Zealand Government established the National Mapping Committee under the Organisation for National Security. With much of the country not easily accessible by road, and limits to topographical maps, the Government acknowledged that aerial surveying was the most economical approach to mapping, and a coordinated approach to mapping was required.

=== Establishment of NZAM ===
Main Article: Piet van Asch

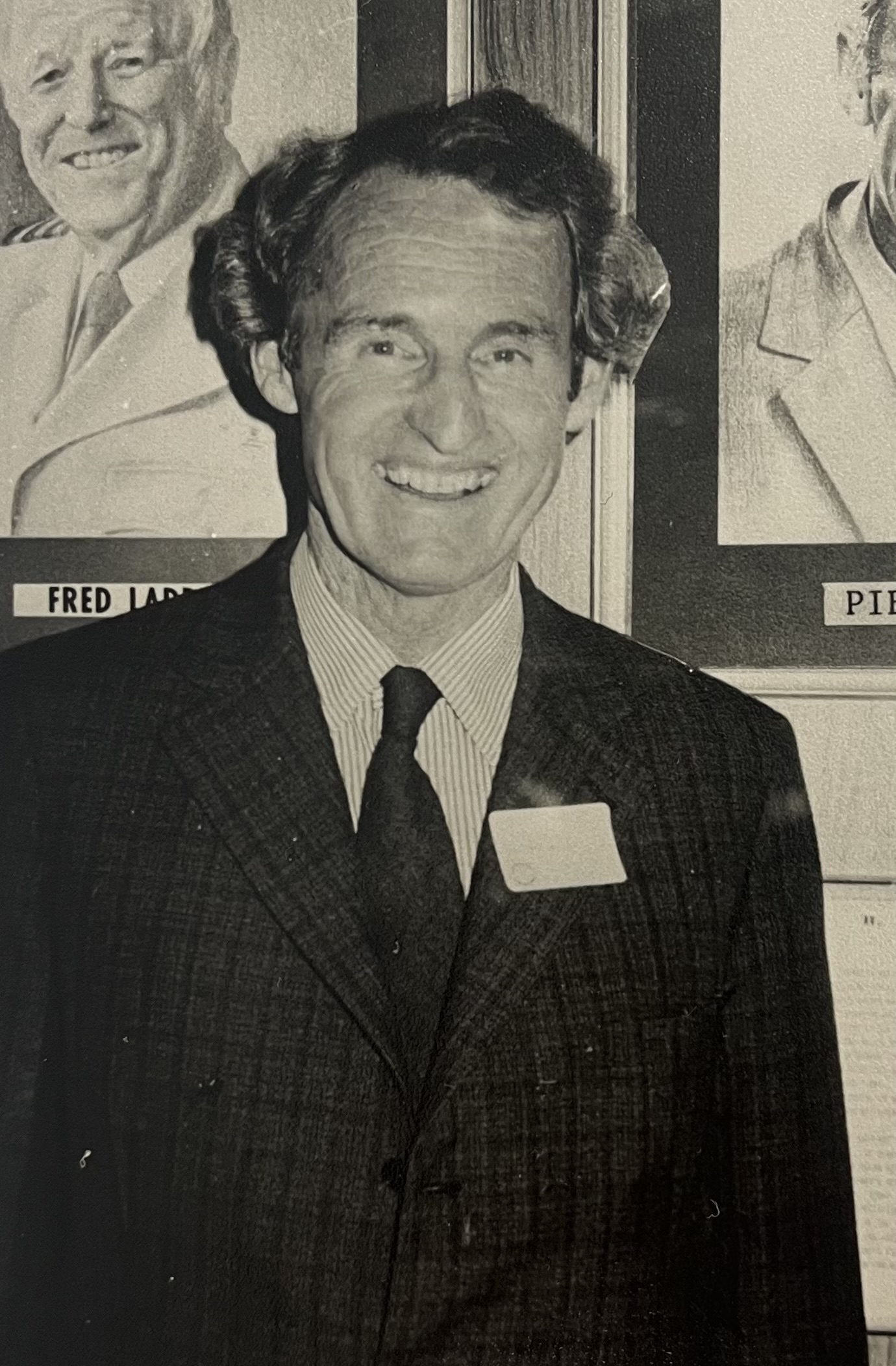
NZAM founder Piet van Asch

New Zealand Aerial Mapping Limited was founded in Hastings, by aviator Piet van Asch in early 1936. Van Asch was born in Waitotara in 1911, and was brought up on his parents' sheep farm near Havelock North. He developed an interest in photography and flying during his time at Christ's College. In December 1934, van Asch gained an 'A' pilot's license, and began to make a name for himself with oblique aerial photographs and photographs of livestock.

In 1935, van Asch declared his interest in starting a company specialising in aerial photography and mapping. Four days after establishing the company, Piet received shareholder permission to travel to London in search for an appropriate aircraft. After a year in England, van Asch bought a Monospar SST25 twin engine aircraft directly from the General Aircraft factory in Feltham, England, for £1450. The Monospar was named the Manu Rere (registered as ZK-AFF). The company made Bridge Pa Aerodrome, Hastings its base of operations.

== 1930s–1940s ==
=== Early surveys ===
In 1937, NZAM were granted the Government Contract to survey. The first survey undertaken was a geological survey in April of that year. The survey, of Richardson Range in Otago covered nearly 300 square miles (780 square kilometres). The plane flew at 11,000 feet, and the result was 843 frame of photography. After the success of the Richardson Range survey, NZAM started carrying out work for the Department of Scientific and Industrial Research (DSIR) and the Public Works Department.

=== 1938 ===
After completing a full year in business, NZAM acquired several new contracts, and made upgrades to the Monospar. In 1938, the first commission for the Land and Survey Department was undertaken, which lead to the purchase of new equipment, including a new camera. To reduce maintenance time between flights, NZAM acquired a new Pobjoy engine, for £345. Due to the tight finances of the company, one of the directors, Hugh Chambers purchased the engine and loaned it to the company.

Founder Piet van Asch also completed several flights on the Monospar with guests on board. One of the most notable was in April 1938, when van Asch invited German Count Felix von Luckner and his wife on a flight from Gisborne to Bridge Pa. Von Luckner was a WWI German war hero, who was well known to New Zealanders due to his seamanship, which saw very little loss of life on both sides. Nonetheless, this drew attention due to rising tensions with Germany.

1938 also saw the NZAM workforce grow, hiring a chief photographer, Lloyd Wilson, a darkroom worker, John Cameron and Peter Marshall as photographer-navigator. From their first year of flying, gross income for NZAM (to June 1938) was £4322. NZAM did not pay dividends until after the Second World War.

=== World War Two ===
Prior to the outbreak of the Second World War, the Royal New Zealand Air Force had continued to undertake mapping projects. There were attempts to place pressure placed on van Asch to merge NZAM with the RNZAF, however, the Minister for Works, Hon. Robert Semple said 'Leave van Asch alone. He's doing a good job'.

However, it became apparent that RNZAF resources were required elsewhere, so it suspended its aerial mapping programme, and NZAM took on a vital role in defensive mapping projects. The New Zealand Government wished to update maps of 'special areas' for defence purposes, and so the RNZAF contracted NZAM to take on this task. The RNZAF provided airforce and refuelling facilities for NZAM to use. To all intents, van Asch and his crew were described as 'airmen in mufti', and the RNZAF and NZAM had an excellent working relationship. NZAM played an integral part in national security efforts during this period, as it camouflaged important Military facilities, including Devonport naval base, Hobsonville, Whenuapai and Wigram on maps the company created. NZAM saw several personnel opt to leave to take a more active role in the war, including Peter Marshall who enlisted as a pilot in 1941. Marshall's plane went down before completing his first tour of operations, so spent the rest of the war as a prisoner in Germany.

==== NZAM's second aircraft – Beechcraft AT-11 ====
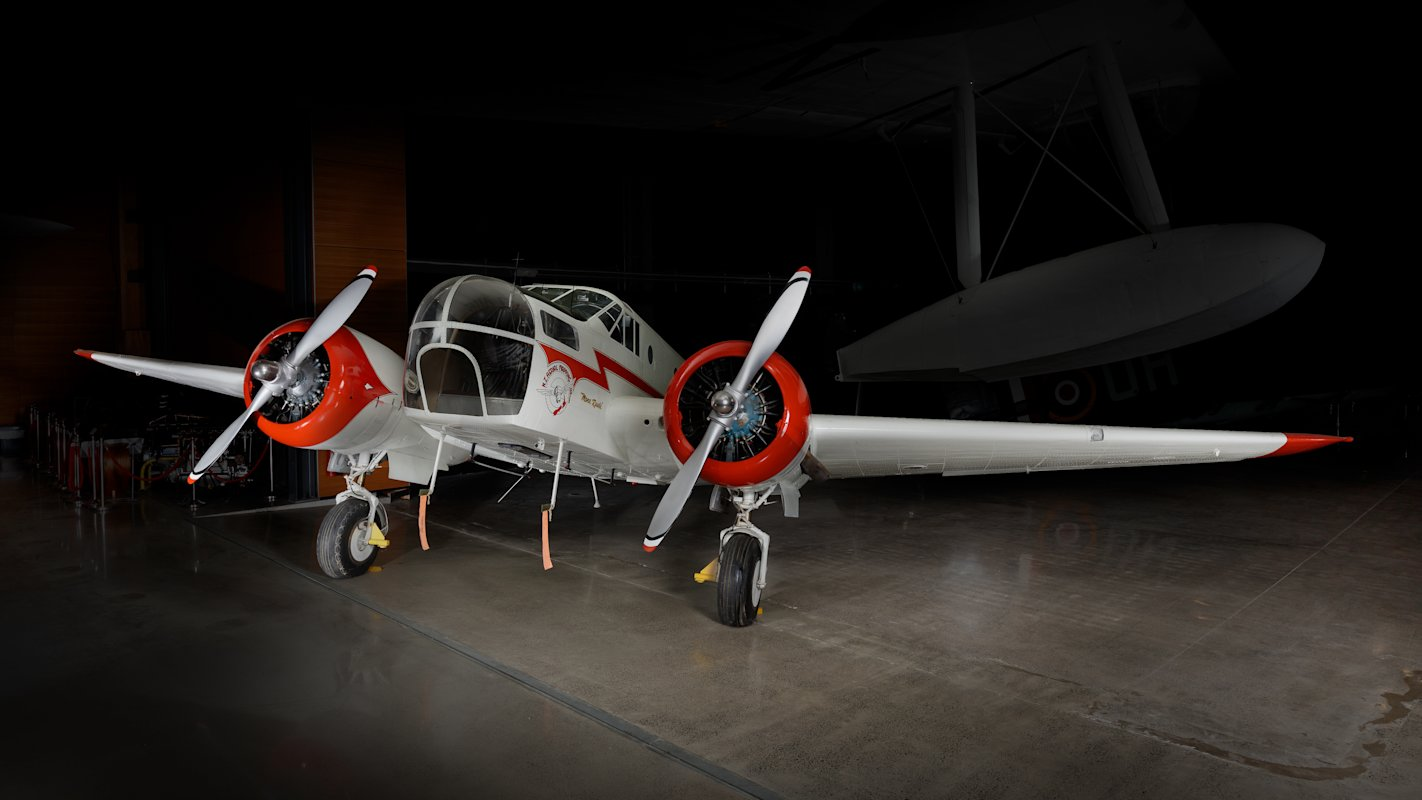
The Beechcraft Manu Ruuri used by NZAM, now on display at MOTAT

By 1943, it was clear that the Monospar was inadequate to undertake all of this. NZAM took delivery of a bigger, more powerful aircraft, a Beechcraft AT-11 from RNZAF. The Beechcraft AT-11 was a new, American advanced trainer, which offered increased flight times, a service ceiling height of 20,000ft and an excellent view through the perspex nose. This was the first time a private company had taken delivery of a government purchased aircraft. As part of the agreement, NZAM would have sole use of the aircraft, and pay the Government per square mile that was produced. It was shipped to New Zealand and assembled at Hobsonville airbase, before being equipped with cameras in Palmerston North. It was named the Manu Ruru ('bird to measure').

By June 1944, NZAM had photographed a total of 25,570 square miles (66,200 square kilometres) for the war effort. 97 topographical sheets had been published. Income from aerial mapping jumped to almost £15,000 by 1943. The success of the war effort placed NZAM firmly as the Government's contractor of choice. The Manu Rere was retired fully after the conclusion of the war, in 1946.

=== Overseas surveys ===
With the range and ability of the newly acquired Beechcraft, the possibilities of overseas surveys became known. The first overseas survey took place in 1944 in Fiji, in particular Suva and parts of Lautoka. A successful survey of the Norfolk Islands was also undertaken, following a request from the Australian Government. Following the success of this survey, NZAM eventually would carry out survey work in most of the Pacific Islands.

=== Post-war ===
The change from wartime mapping, mainly for the Defence Department, to peacetime mapping, for Government departments like Lands and Surveys went smoothly. The NZAM workforce expanded, to 22 specialists, including a new engineer-camera operator, Alva Cutler, who would go on to be an engineer at NZAM for 25 years. Profits had increased by 300% by the end of 1945. In 1946, the Beechcraft was commissioned to take the Minister of Forests, Major Jerry Skinner throughout the country to inspect the damaged caused by forestry fires, which had been particularly bad. It covered Hastings, Rotoehu, Whakatane and Te Whaiti districts.

== 1950s ==
In the early 1950s, NZAM yet again made extensive ground-based expansion. Two key appointments were made, Pilot Officer Cyril Whitaker and Science Graduate Brian Perry.

=== Introduction of photogrammetry ===
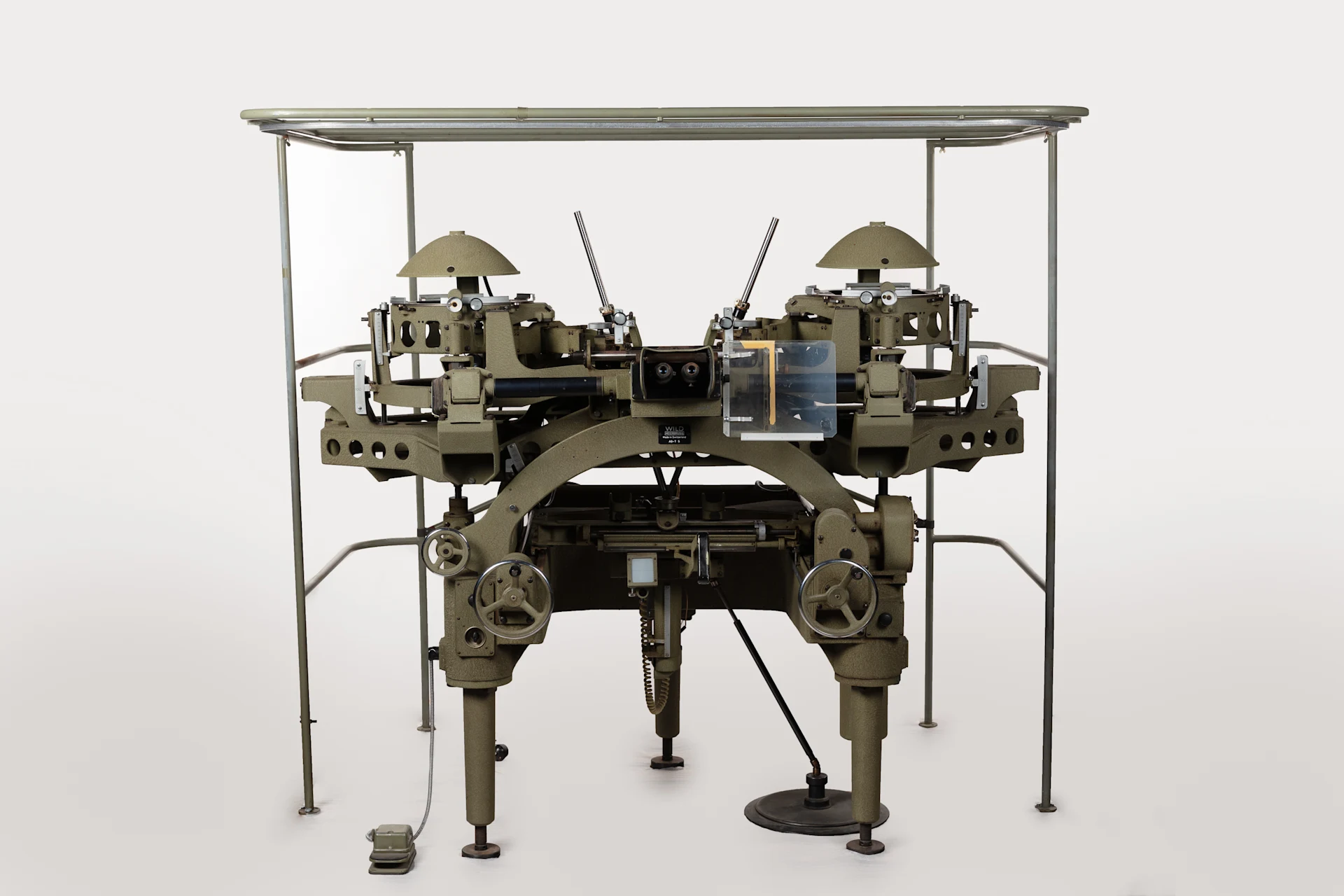
Wild Heerbrugg A8 725 Stereoplotter used by NZAM, now in the MOTAT collection

1953 saw the introduction of Photogrammetry on the suggestion of the then Surveyor-General. Brian Perry was brought in as a specialist photogrammetrist on his recommendation, with his background in physics and mathematics. Photogrammetry is the science of deriving information about land and its features from the interpretation of photographs. NZAM purchased a Wild Heerbrugg A8 725 stereoplotter to undertake this, followed by two more A8's in quick succession. Van Asch had formed a working friendship with Albert Schmidheini, leader of the Swiss firm Wild Heerbrugg, who helped organise the acquisition for NZAM. Accurate contours in maps could be produced by overlapping pairs of vertical photographs, a big step for NZAM.

=== Pacific surveys ===
Following the successful first ventures into the Pacific in the mid 1940s, NZAM were approached to undertake more surveys. In 1954, the Administrator of Western Samoa, Guy Powles visited the Hastings offices with the proposal. The Surveyor-General approved funding for a project to cover Upolu and Savai'i, the two main islands of Samoa. The Beechcraft made a multiple stage flight, via Norfolk Island, Tontouta and Nadi, Fiji before undertaking the survey between June and August, covering Western Samoa and American Eastern Samoa.

=== New premises ===
Due to the rapid growth of the company, the initial NZAM headquarters became too small to house the growing work force. In 1956 a custom designed headquarters on the corner of Avenue Road and Warren Street in Hastings was built, designed by prominent Hastings architect Eric Phillips. The new premises had its own central powerhouse, which was essential for providing clean air and water for the photography. The headquarters would eventually be known as the National Mapping Centre. These premises were both country and world leading. Dairy industry pumps were used to suck the films and papers flats to ensure best quality results with the enlargers and copy cameras.

== 1960s ==
The 1960s saw NZAM undertaking several notable projects. From 1958, into the 1960s, the company undertook a project surveying all New Zealand highways. Notably, the survey for the southern Auckland motorway. Throughout the decade, South Island farmlands were covered, and the first flying coverage of the North Island was nearly completed.

Several personnel changes were made throughout the decade. Cyril Whitaker was appointed to the NZAM board of directors. The position of chief photographer became vacant in 1965, so van Asch opted to bring someone with overseas experience in. Van Asch placed advertisements in London newspapers, and appointed John Symington, a wartime navigator to fill the role. Piet van Asch's son, Hugh also started casual work for the company.

=== New equipment ===
In late 1965, NZAM made upgrades to their cameras, purchasing several of the longer focal length Zeiss cameras. This provided far greater detail than the previous Eagle cameras, particularly for city survey photography. New equipment and a growing workforce once again placed pressure on the headquarters of NZAM. However, in 1965 the opportunity to purchase the neighbouring property arose. The building, originally a builders' yard house, was converted as a mosaic room at the front, and a lunchroom for staff in the back.

==== Aero Commander 680F ====
Whilst the Beechcraft was excellent, it turned 20 years old in 1963. NZAM look towards a new aircraft that could provide a higher service ceiling. The company gained its third aircraft in 1964, an Aero Commander 680F registered as ZK-CDK, and named 'Matariki' in 1967. The Matariki had an operating ceiling of 25,000ft, which was triple the camera to ground clearance of the Beechcraft, and was 20 knots faster. The runway at Bridge Pa was extended at the cost of £2000 to accommodate the new aircraft. The Aero Commander proved to be invaluable for NZAM, and remained a working plane into the 21st century. The Beechcraft still provided value for NZAM, and worked in tandem with the Aero Commander for 15 years, following a contract extension with the government.

=== Colour photography ===
The mid-1960s saw an increase of coloured photography. In a contract for the New Zealand Forest Service, a full-scale survey was carried out over the Kaingaroa State Forrest, to enable studies of a fungus (dothystroma) that was causing damage. NZAM were also successful in processing coloured images of the site of the Mount Tarawera eruption, however, at this stage, the film still had to be sent to Europe for processing.

=== 'This is New Zealand' ===
The most notable project of the 1960s was filming for the National Film Unit's 'This is New Zealand'. This film was make specifically for the New Zealand pavilion at the 1970 World Expo in Osaka, Japan. In collecting footage, three cameras were mounted in the nose of the Beechcraft, which enabled three screen stereoscopic viewing. This is New Zealand won high acclaim, including in 2007, where the remastered edition of the film won the bronze world medal at the New York Festivals Film and Video Competition.

== 1970s–1980s ==
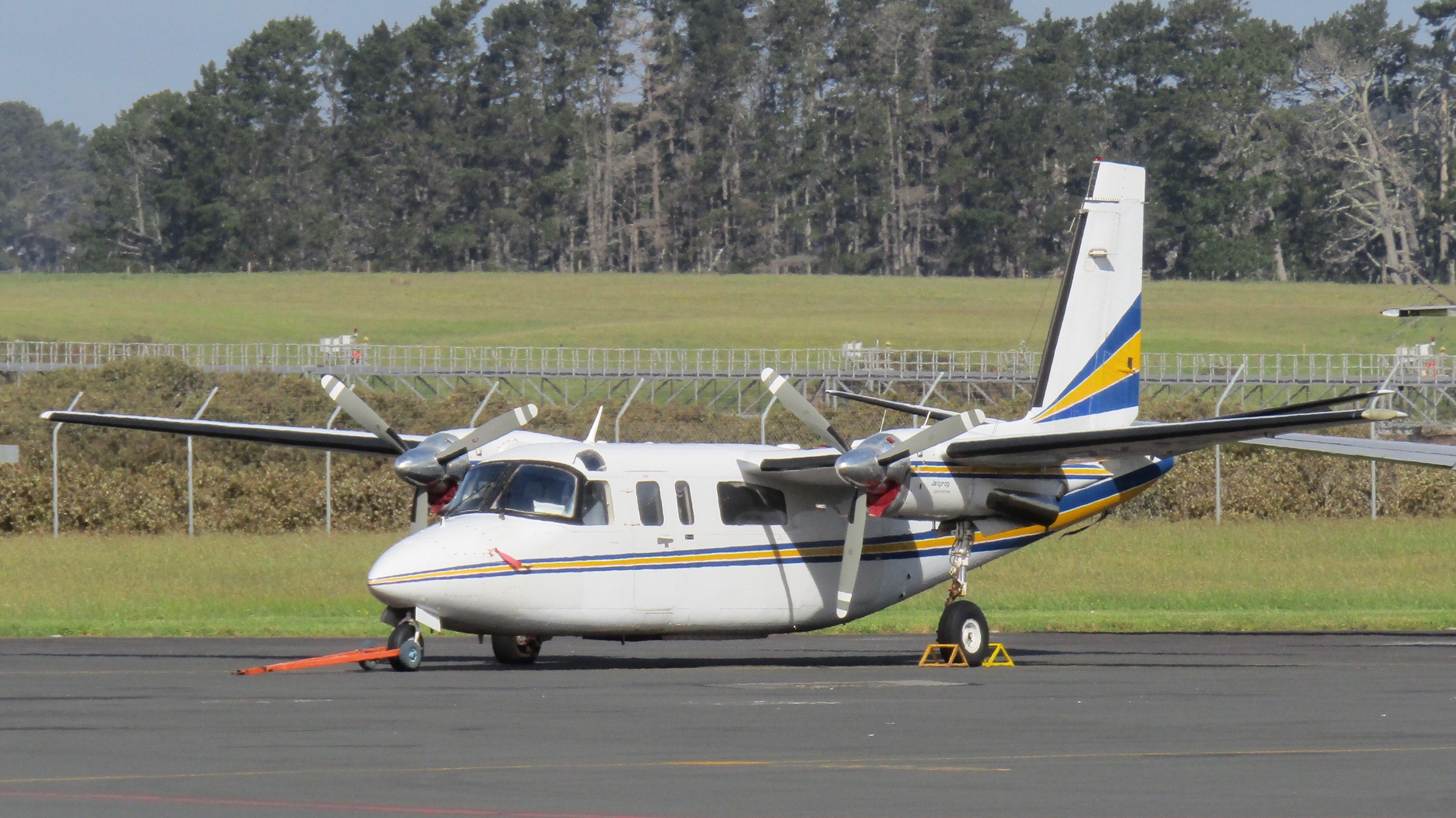
ZK-PVB, now owned and operated by Air Chathams. Originally registered by NZAM.

With the shift in projects, NZAM required the acquisition of new aircraft in order to successfully reach a higher altitude. NZAM acquired a Rockwell Commander 690B in 1978, the updated version of the Aero Commander. Surveyor-General Ian Stirling approved the expenditure of $730,000 on the aircraft. The aircraft was registered ZK-PVA, the initials being in honour of founder Piet van Asch.

=== Thermo work ===
NZAM began conducting thermo vision work for the Lands and Survey Department between Taupo and Rotorua. This was to help with the design of road extensions and cable placements. The thermo vision work allowed any potential ground hotspots to be flagged and avoided. This survey was done in the first two hours of daylight, and the last two hours before dark to record accurate temperature ground changes.

=== Return to the Pacific ===
Throughout the 1970s and 1980s, with new equipment, NZAM made a 'round robin' of Pacific Countries. The Solomon Islands were photographed in 1972, to assess damage created by Hurricane Ida. This was in agreement with both the British Administration and the independent government of the Solomons. Fiji was once again visited in 1978. This was followed by surveys in Niue and Tonga, for afforestation and a sewerage scheme in Nukualofa, Tonga. This was followed by a return to Western Samoa.

=== Van Asch recognition and retirement ===
In 1977, NZAM founder Piet van Asch was recognised as a 'Pioneer of New Zealand Aviation' in the Museum of Transport and Technology (MOTAT) exhibition by the same name. This was one of the first times the work of NZAM was displayed. Several items belonging to NZAM remain on display and in the MOTAT collection today. Both Piet van Asch and NZAM held life memberships at MOTAT (NZAM's being a Corporate Membership). Van Asch retired as managing director of NZAM in 1980, but retained the office of the Chairman. He gave up his commercial pilots license the same year, after completing over 6850 hours of flying. Piet's son, Hugh had joined the company full time in 1972, and became a director a year later. Hugh was promoted to co-managing director after the retirement of his father.

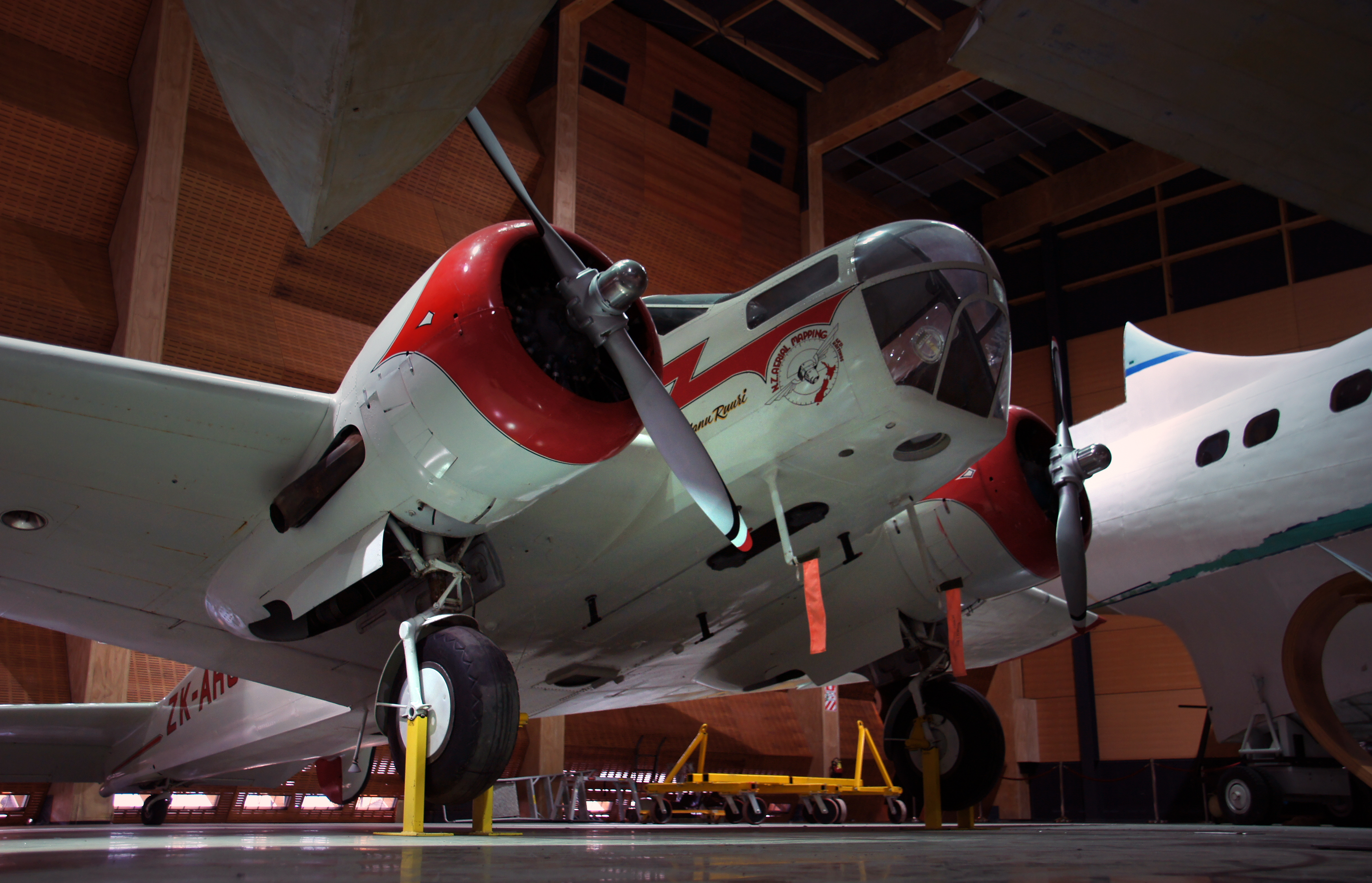
On display at the MOTAT Aviation Pavilion, 2013

=== Beechcraft retirement ===
With the purchase of the new Rockwell Commander 690B, the Beechcraft was no longer required for service. On the last day of 1979, it was decided that the Manu Ruuri was to be retired. In January 1982, the Manu Ruru was flown to Hobsonville airport, the same place it had been collected by NZAM 39 years earlier. It was taken to MOTAT for permanent display, where it can be found in the Aviation Pavilion. NZAM staff detached the wings from the Beechcraft, before it was towed to MOTAT.

=== 1986 50th anniversary ===
In June 1986, in preparation for the 50th anniversary of NZAM, tragedy struck as the Monospar was destroyed in a fire. During testing and calibrating the Manu Rere's fuel tank, static electricity, thought to have been caused by a spark from nylon clothing, set the plane alight.

Later that year, a book on the first 50 years of NZAM, Piet's eye in the Sky: The story of New Zealand Aerial Mapping was written by Geoff Conly. Piet van Asch provided documents and his own account into writing. It was published by Grantham House Publishing.

== 1990s onwards ==
The 1990s saw yet another turn for NZAM, with many changes necessitated by the start of the digital era. There was a steady decline in government and local authority contracts, in part due to the 'tender and do' market. In 1993, a merger between computer based land information company Aeroplan and NZAM saw the introduction of advanced computer technology.

=== Piet van Asch death ===
Founder of NZAM, Piet van Asch died in October 1996. His funeral was attended by numerous ex-NZAM employees, and government officials. Piet's son, Hugh van Asch remained with the company.

=== 21st century ===
At the turn of the century, NZAM made several changes to leadership and governance. It also acquired more aircraft, including several Cessna 402Bs. In 2005, NZAM was sold to Mark Roberts, a New Zealand businessman and Mohammad Hanno, a Saudi Arabian airline pilot.

NZAM had rapid expansion overseas, with offices in Australia, Saudi Arabia, and Kuala Lumpur. From the mid-2000s, NZAM based an aircraft in the Middle East for majority of the year due to the uptake in overseas work. The first Middle East contract was surveying the Kuwait-Saudi Arabia border. This was followed by several other projects, including surveying the holy city of Mecca, which required a Muslim crew.

== Receivership ==
In July 2014, it was announced that the company was going into receivership. The remaining 22 staff at NZAM were made redundant. The primary cause for this was a Saudi Arabian contract with more than NZ$1.5 million owing remaining unpaid.

== Aircraft index ==
- Monospar ST-25
- Beech AT-11 Kansan
- Aero Commander 680F
- Rockwell Commander 690B
- Cessna 402B
