= Grace Hollander =

New Zealand community leader (1922–2016)

Dame Grace Hollander DNZM CBE JP
- Born: Grace Shellie Goldsmith; 25 March 1922; Christchurch, New Zealand
- Died: 27 June 2016 (aged 94); Palmerston North, New Zealand
- Known for: Activism
- Spouse: Eber Hollander

Dame Grace Shellie Hollander DNZM CBE JP (née Goldsmith, 25 March 1922 – 27 June 2016) was a New Zealand community leader.

== Biography ==
Born in Christchurch on 25 March 1922, Grace Shellie Goldsmith was the daughter of post-World War I Jewish migrants to New Zealand, Dinah Goldsmith (née Vander Molen) and Leon Arundul Goldsmith. She was educated at Christchurch Girls' High School, and went on to study at Digby's Commercial College in Christchurch. During World War II, she served with the Voluntary Aid Detachment, and in 1947 she married Eber Hollander.

Having previously studied accountancy and worked as a statistical officer for Hay's department store, Hollander took over the management of the family fashion business when her husband became ill. She later managed a chartered accountant's office.

Alongside her work and family duties, Hollander became involved in a range of voluntary community organisations, including the National Council of Women of New Zealand, the Christchurch Relief and Welfare Association, the United Nations Association of New Zealand, the Consumer Council, the Standards Council, the New Zealand Council of Jewish Women, the Canterbury Women's Cricket Council and the New Zealand Ethnic Federation. She served as treasurer and president of the National Council of Women, president of the Ethnic Federation and president of the Council of Jewish Women.

Following the 2011 Christchurch earthquake, Hollander moved to Palmerston North, where she died on 27 June 2016, aged 94.

== Honours and awards ==
Hollander was awarded the Queen Elizabeth II Silver Jubilee Medal in 1977. In the 1979 Queen's Birthday Honours, she was appointed a Commander of the Order of the British Empire, for services to the National Council of Women and the community. In 1993, she was awarded the New Zealand Suffrage Centennial Medal.

She was made a Distinguished Companion of the New Zealand Order of Merit, for services to the community, in the 2000 Queen's Birthday Honours, and accepted re-designation as a Dame Companion of the same order following the restoration of titular honours by the New Zealand government in 2009.
