= 1961 New Year Honours (New Zealand) =

Annual awards for New Zealanders

The 1961 New Year Honours in New Zealand were appointments by Elizabeth II on the advice of the New Zealand government to various orders and honours to reward and highlight good works by New Zealanders. The awards celebrated the passing of 1960 and the beginning of 1961, and were announced on 31 December 1960.

The recipients of honours are displayed here as they were styled before their new honour.

== Knight Bachelor ==
- The Honourable Francis Boyd Adams – formerly a judge of the Supreme Court of New Zealand.

== Order of Saint Michael and Saint George ==
=== Companion (CMG) ===
- Leslie Cecil Lloyd Averill MC MD FRCS – of Christchurch. For services to the medical profession in New Zealand.
- Herbert Leslie Bockett – Secretary of Labour and Director of Employment.

== Order of the British Empire ==
=== Knight Commander (KBE) ===
Civil division

- Guy Richardson Powles CMG – High Commissioner for Western Samoa, 1949–1960, and High Commissioner for New Zealand in India since July 1960.

=== Commander (CBE) ===
Civil division

- James Andrew – a member of the New Zealand Wool Board, of Masterton.
- Keith Nicholson Buttle JP – formerly mayor of the City of Auckland.
- George Edward Turney JP – public trustee, of Wellington.

Military division

- Brigadier Frank Leo Hutter ED MB ChB – Royal New Zealand Army Medical Corps (Territorial Force), of Wellington.
- Air Commodore Thomas Francis Gill DSO – Royal New Zealand Air Force.
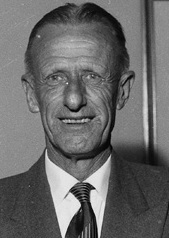
Keith Buttle

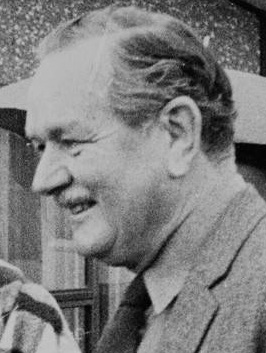
Frank Gill

=== Officer (OBE) ===
Civil division

- Norman Rhind Bain – Crown prosecutor and Crown solicitor at Wanganui.
- James Gumming – of Petone. For services to the community.
- Elizabeth Gregory – dean of the School of Home Science, University of Otago.
- Charles William Feilden Hamilton – of Timaru. For services in the field of engineering.
- Julius McLachlan Hogben. For services in cultural activities in Auckland.
- Carl Herluf Richard Jepsen – of Upper Hutt. For philanthropic services.
- Michael Rotohiko Jones MM JP – of Wellington. For services to the Māori people.
- Geoffrey Nevill JP – formerly resident commissioner of the Cook Islands.
- Stanley Ivan Russell – of Nelson. For services to local government.
- Arthur Hugh Ward – of Wellington. For services to the dairy industry.

Military division

- Lieutenant-Colonel Phillip John Oliver ED – Royal Regiment of New Zealand Artillery (Territorial Force), of Hamilton.
- Lieutenant-Colonel Henry McKenzie Reid – Royal New Zealand Army Ordnance Corps (Regular Force), of Wellington.
- Wing Commander Jack Hardy – Royal New Zealand Air Force, of Christchurch.
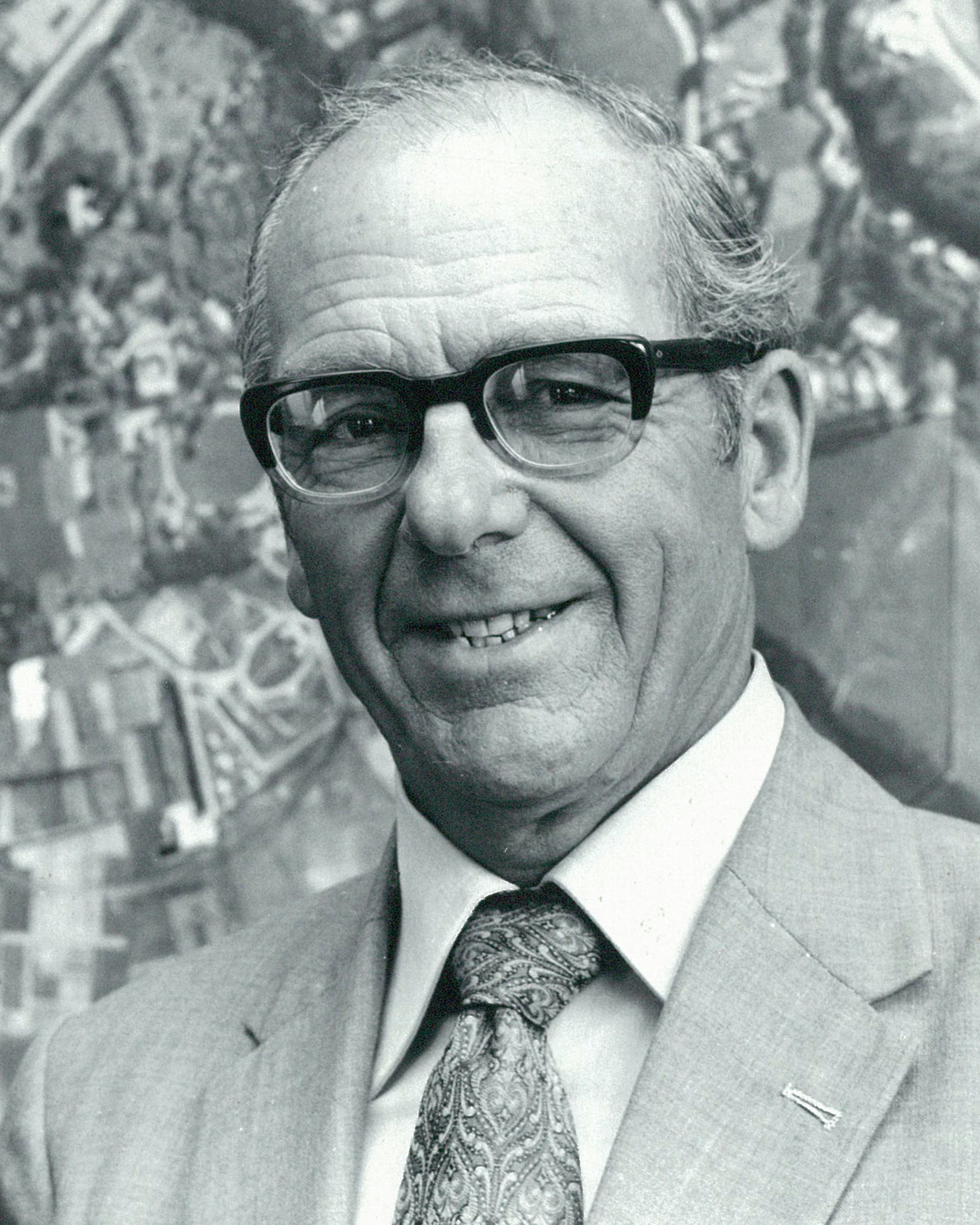
Arthur Ward

=== Member (MBE) ===
Civil division

- William Clayton JP – of Westland. For services to local government.
- Winter Cole JP. For services to local body and community organisations in Christchurch and North Canterbury.
- Esther Hill Elliott – matron of the Ross Home for the Aged, Dunedin.
- Francis Stanley Grayling – of New Plymouth. For services to local government.
- Murray Gordon Halberg – of Auckland. For services in the field of athletics.
- William Patrick Hartstonge – mayor of Mosgiel, 1938–1959.
- Joseph Thomas Head JP – in recognition of his services as a member of the Royal New Zealand Navy (Civil Staff), particularly in social welfare and industrial conciliation.
- Neil Buchanan Hunt – chairman of the Rotorua County Council.
- Rowena Othlie Jackson (Mrs Rowena Chatfield) – of Auckland. For services to ballet in New Zealand.
- The Reverend Ngapaka Kukutai – of Ngāruawāhia. For services to the Māori people.
- Mary Elizabeth McLean – of Christchurch. For services to the community and to local government in many fields.
- Catherine Johnston Ovens – district nurse at Motueka.
- Joyce Edith Phipps – corps officer, St John's Ambulance Brigade, of Auckland.
- Papali'i Poumau – in recognition of his services in the Samoan public service and latterly as administrator of the island of Savai'i.
- Robert John Runciman JP – of Timaru. For services to the children's health camp movement.
- George Smith JP – of Huntly. For services to local government.
- Harold Welton Smith – chief engineer to the Ministry of Works at Invercargill.
- Ernest Ronald Spriggs JP – of Napier. For services to local government.
- Gladys May Wilson – sister-in-charge, geriatric ward, Cook Hospital, Gisborne.

Civil division, additional, for gallantry

- Horace Trevor Williams – school teacher, of Russell. For courage and determination when effecting the rescue of a mother and her child from a burning house.

Military division

- Temporary Lieutenant-Commander (SP) Frank James Glanville – Royal New Zealand Navy Volunteer Reserve, of Christchurch.
- Warrant Officer Second Class John Tasman Dawson – Royal New Zealand Infantry Corps (Territorial Force), of Edendale.
- Major (temporary) Donald Hector McLeod ED – Royal New Zealand Infantry Corps (Territorial Force), of Gisborne.
- Captain Maysie Hildreth Moore – New Zealand Women's Royal Army Corps (now retired), of Wellington.
- Lieutenant and Quartermaster Henry Williamson – Royal New Zealand Army Ordnance Corps (Regular Force), of Ngāruawāhia.
- Flight Lieutenant Harvey Colin O'Loughlin – Air Training Corps, of Greymouth.
- Warrant Officer (W) Catherine Frances Bryers – Women's Royal New Zealand Air Force, of Auckland.
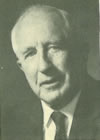
Ron Spriggs

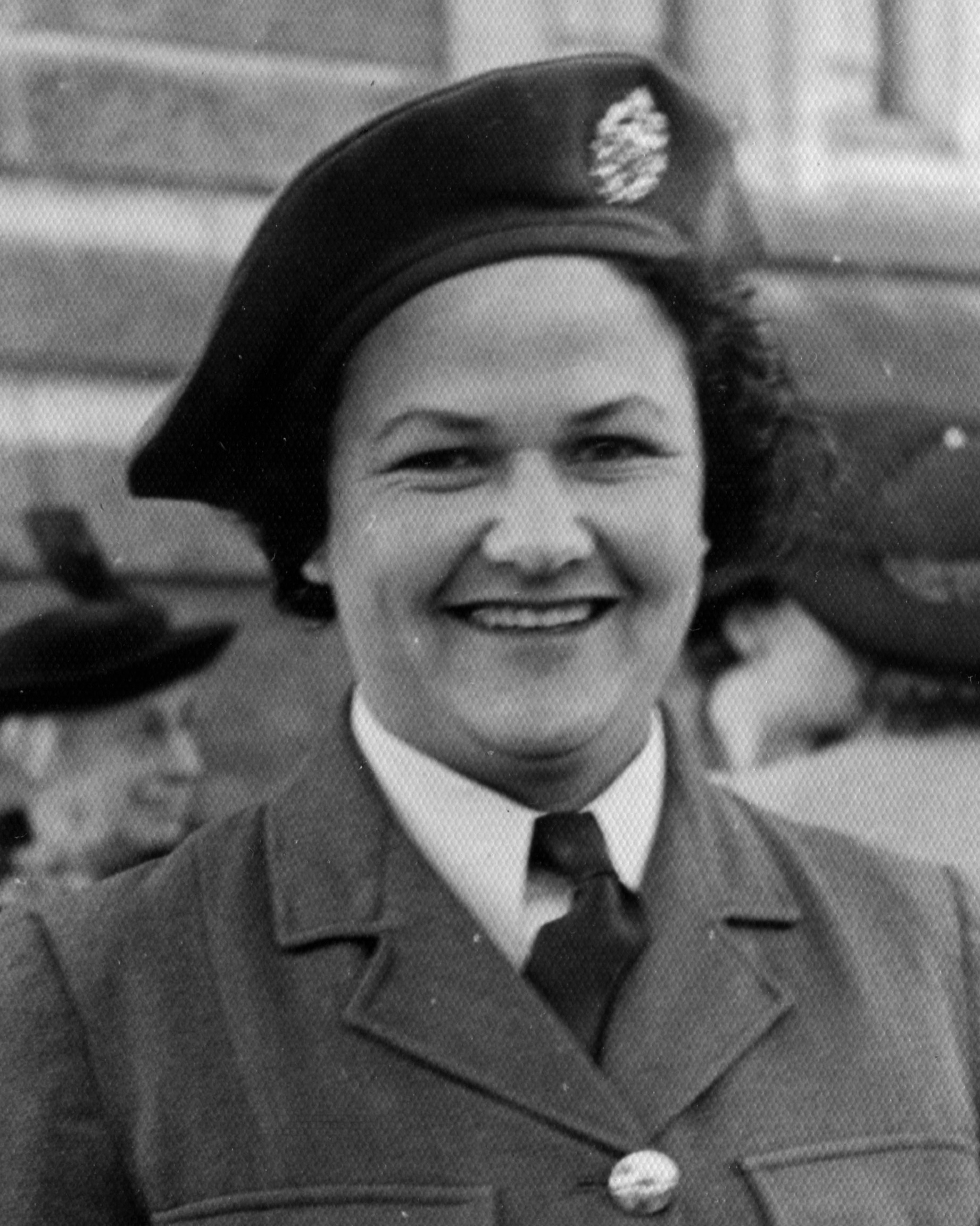
Frances Bryers

== British Empire Medal (BEM) ==
Civil division

- John Dudley Cleeve – constable, New Zealand Police Force, of Piopio.
- Tohovaka – sergeant, Niue Police Department, Niue Island.
- George Colin Urquhart – detective senior sergeant, New Zealand Police Force, of Christchurch.

Civil division, for gallantry

- Desmond Smith – launch master, Russell. For courage and determination when effecting the rescue of a mother and her child from a burning house.

Military division

- Chief Petty Officer John Barker – Royal New Zealand Navy, of Dunedin.
- Corporal James William Carter – New Zealand Regiment (Regular Force), of Auckland.
- Sergeant Peter Crowther – Corps of Royal New Zealand Engineers (Regular Force), of Auckland.
- Chief Engineering Mechanic Thomas Arthur Hardy – Royal New Zealand Navy, of Auckland.
- Chief Ordnance Artificer Samuel Harris – Royal New Zealand Navy, of Auckland.
- Sergeant George Gordon Scott Harvey – Royal New Zealand Air Force, of Whenuapai.
- Staff-Sergeant Frederick John Kinley – New Zealand Regiment (Regular Force), of Gore.
- Chief Wren Maureen Margaret McCambridge – Women's Royal New Zealand Naval Service, of Timaru.
- Warrant Officer Second Class (temporary) Ian McDonald Russell – Royal New Zealand Army Ordnance Corps (Regular Force), of Frankton Junction.
- Flight Sergeant Johnston Vivian William Thomas – Royal New Zealand Air Force, of Christchurch.
- Warrant Officer Second Class (temporary) Robert Maurice Urquhart – Royal Regiment of New Zealand Artillery (Regular Force), of Christchurch.

== Air Force Cross (AFC) ==
- Flight Lieutenant Alexander Robertson Campbell – Royal New Zealand Air Force, of Ohakea.
- Flight Lieutenant William Joseph Cranfield – Royal New Zealand Air Force, of Weedons, Christchurch.
- Flight Lieutenant John Corfe Evison – Royal New Zealand Air Force, of Auckland.

== Air Force Medal (AFM) ==
- Flight Sergeant Peter Antwis – Royal New Zealand Air Force, of Whenuapai.

== Queen's Police Medal (QPM) ==
- Francis John Brady – chief superintendent, New Zealand Police Force, of Auckland.

== Queen's Fire Services Medal (QFSM) ==
- George Alexander Mackenzie – deputy chief fire officer, Auckland Fire Brigade.
- Henry James Hayward – chief fire officer, Kaikōura Volunteer Fire Brigade.
