= Barbara Calvert (academic) =

New Zealand professor of education

- Born: 19 October 1918; Waipawa
- Died: 24 April 2008

Academic background
- Education: University of Otago, University of Otago
- Theses: The causes and the significance of discrepancies between I.Q.s determined by the mental age and the point scale methods from the same data (1944); The determination of the ascorbic acid content of New Zealand tomatoes, tomato products and tree tomatoes using the spekker photoelectric absorptiometer (1941)

Barbara Calvert (née Johns, 19 October 1918 – 24 April 2008) was a New Zealand educational sociologist, accountant, and was professor emerita at the University of Otago. Calvert was the first woman to head a New Zealand university department of education and is considered one of the earliest female professors in the field.

== Early life and education ==
Calvert, born Barbara Johns, was the eldest of three daughters born to Mr and Mrs V. R. Johns. She was born in Waipawa, where her grandfather was a vicar, but grew up in Auckland. Johns attended Auckland Girls Grammar School, where she was dux and head prefect. At school she became friends with Dorothea Horsman, and the two remained friends for life. Calvert completed a Master of Home Science at the University of Otago in 1941, under the supervision of Elizabeth Gregory. Her thesis was titled The determination of the ascorbic acid content of New Zealand tomatoes, tomato products and tree tomatoes using the spekker photoelectric absorptiometer. Calvert followed this with a Master of Arts in education titled The causes and the significance of discrepancies between I.Q.s determined by the mental age and the point scale methods from the same data also at the University of Otago, completed in 1944. She also won a university prize in philosophy.

== Academic career ==
From 1944 Calvert was an assistant lecturer at Otago. In 1945 Calvert wrote a report for the Professorial Board on student lodging, recommending the purchase of land for student housing. In 1950, Calvert was one of only two New Zealand academics awarded an Imperial Relations Trust Fellowship in education, awarded by the Institute of Education at the University of London. While in the UK she left her three small children in the care of their grandmother and other family members, for which she was criticised. She had already caused a stir by wearing slacks rather than skirts to lectures at the university. Calvert used her year-long fellowship to develop her master's work in education through the development of a non-verbal intelligence test. On her return from England, Calvert lost her position in the university education department through restructuring. She retrained as an accountant, and practised part-time for nine years.

Calvert rejoined the faculty of the department of education at Otago in 1964, rising to senior lecturer in 1970 and full professor in 1976. She may be the first woman to hold a professorial chair in a New Zealand education department. Calvert was appointed to the Social Development Council in 1974, and worked with Presbyterian Support.

In 1976 Calvert became the first woman to be head of a New Zealand university department of education. She remained head of education until her compulsory retirement at the end of 1983. At her retirement, she was described as "a modest and unassuming woman whose quiet demeanour conceals an active and lively mind." It was also noted that she "arrived at a troublesome time in the history of the department and provided a steady hand at the helm to guide it through that difficult period."

In her early nutrition research, Calvert had worked to provide an alternative source of Vitamin C supplements during wartime, when citrus fruit became scarce. She identified rosehips as a good source, and developed a process for the production of rosehip syrup. She was also interested in fluoride supplementation. Calvert's later work included directing the National Household Survey in 1981–1982, which found that most New Zealand boys had never operated a washing machine or helped make a meal, and that child-rearing was more expensive than purchasing an average house. Calvert also gave lectures to Playcentre and other groups, on subjects such as the role of fathers. After her retirement, Calvert worked as a volunteer for the Dunedin Multidisciplinary Health and Development Study.

== Personal life ==
In 1944 Calvert married Dick Calvert, whose mother Phyllis Calvert had been a French lecturer at the University of Otago. Dick Calvert's maternal aunt Isabel Turnbull also taught classics at the university. Their six children include education lecturer Jenny Bunce and politician Hilary Calvert.

Calvert was active in the Presbyterian Church at Opoho, and served as Playcentre national president. She and her husband donated the house that Opoho Playcentre occupies. The Calverts were also keen trampers and gardeners. In the 1960s and 1970s Calvert worked a marriage guidance counsellor, one of the first two accredited as such in Dunedin.

Calvert died in 2008. After her death, Calvert's granddaughter Mel Bunce, also an academic, described her as "a strong woman who challenged the world with principles, love and gusto and taught her whole family to do the same". Calvert and her husband were two of the first people to support the fundraising appeal to establish a Mediterranean garden at Dunedin Botanic Gardens, with a donation of $40,000.

== Selected works ==
- Barbara Calvert, The role of the pupil. London; Boston: Routledge and K. Paul 1975
- Calvert, Barbara (1989). Preparing for parenting : 846 fifteen year olds' opinions. University of Otago. p. 130. ISBN 0-908701-11-X. Wikidata Q125589542.
- Calvert, Barbara (1945). "The ascorbic-acid content of some New Zealand products". New Zealand Journal of Science and Technology. 27 (2). ISSN 0375-0140. Wikidata Q125589703.
