= Catherine Frances Bryers =

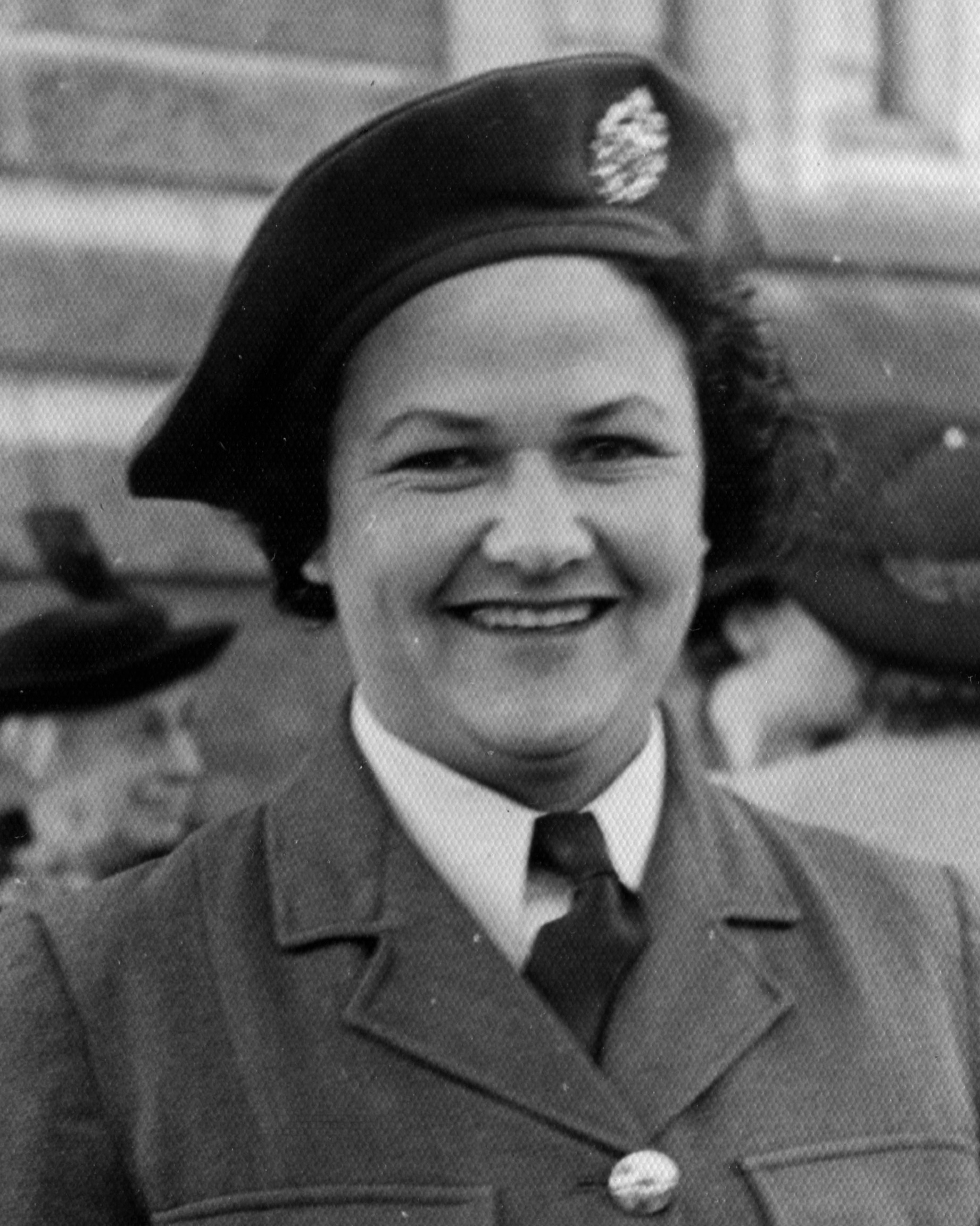
- Catherine Frances Bryers, during World War II
- Born: 15 July 1917; Rawene, New Zealand
- Died: 18 November 1989 (aged 72)
- Military career
- Branch: Royal New Zealand Air Force
- Service years: 1942-1962
- Rank: Warrant Officer
- Nicknames: Frances, Francie
- Service number: WWII 2140
- Unit: Women's Auxiliary Air Force
- Awards: MBE

Catherine Frances Bryers (also known as Frances Bryers) was a Warrant Officer and pioneering figure within the New Zealand Women's Auxiliary Air Force during World War II.

== Biography ==
Bryers was born on 15 July 1917 in Rawene, New Zealand, to mother Maggie "Maiki Mete" Smith Bryers (1886-1964) and father Ivor Stanfield Bryers (1886-1958), whose family had lived in Rawene since the 1840s, until the 1940s. She was Māori of Ngā Puhi and Ngāti Ruanui descent.

Bryers died on 18 November 1989 at age 72.

== Service ==
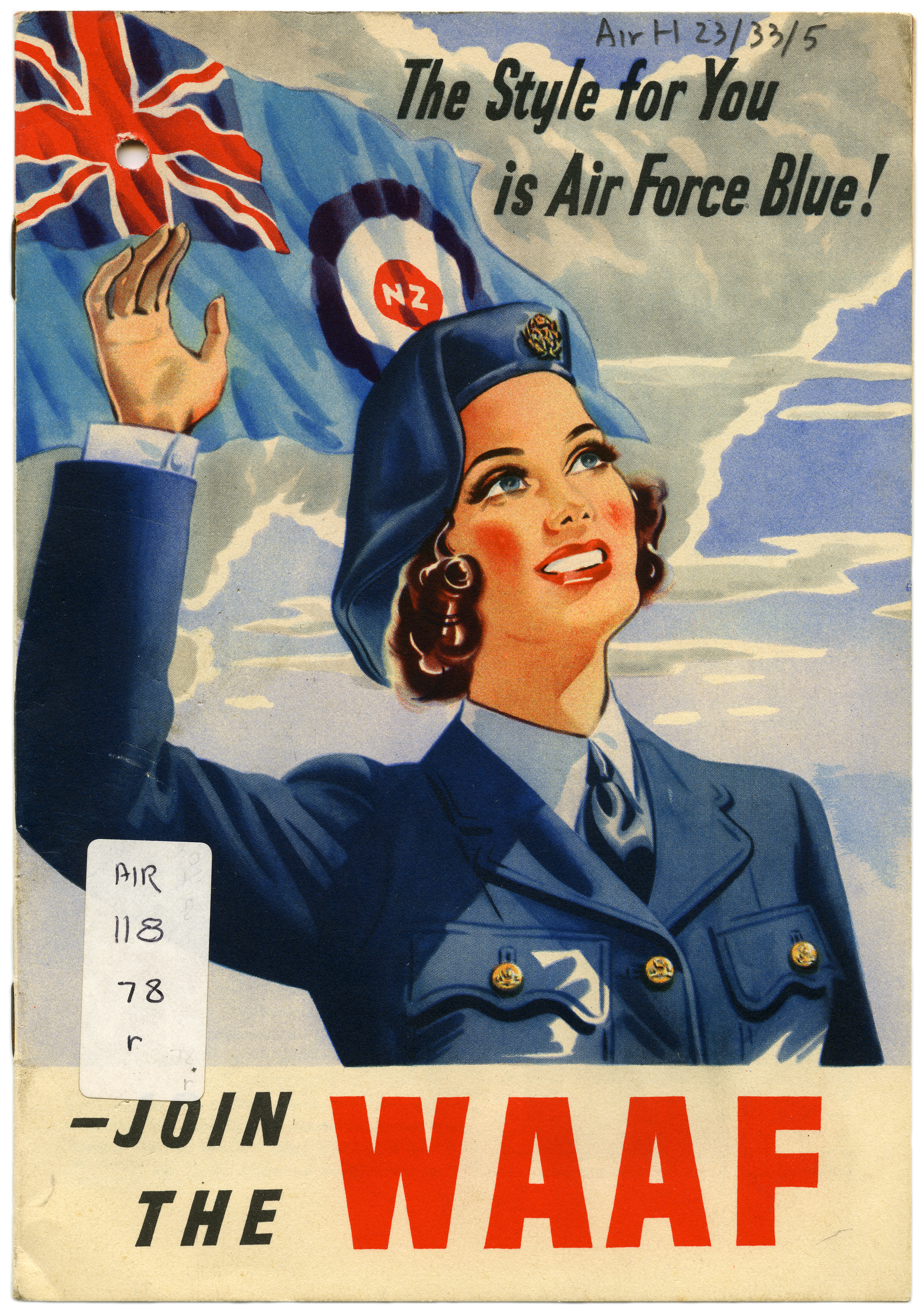
Women’s Auxiliary Air Force (WAAF) recruitment booklet

On 8 June 1942, Bryers enlisted in the Women's Auxiliary Air Force which was founded in January 1941. Bryers had two sisters who also enlisted in service, Lulu Huirangi Bryers (1915-2002), who served in the Women's Auxilitary Air Force, and Alice Mary Bryers, who served in both the WAAF and Women's Royal Naval Services.

Bryers started as an accounts payable clerk and later managed the accounts department at Hobsonville Airbase. In 1946, her application for selection to partake in the Victory Parade, among other New Zealand Army, Navy and Air Force personnel to represent New Zealand at Britain's Victory Parade in London, was accepted. Names of those marching were announced on 12 April 1946 by the Minister of Defence, Fred Jones. On the representative list record, Bryers is wrongly listed as 'Byrnes'. Bryers embarked to England on the SS Maunganui, departing Wellington on 20 April 1946. Landing at Port Tilbury on 27 May, the Victory Parade took place on 8 June.

== Awards & Legacy ==
In 1952 Bryers received the Queen's Warrant from Elizabeth II. She was noted as the first member of the New Zealand Women's Auxiliary Air Force to be honoured with this award. In 1961, Bryers was appointed an Order of the British Empire by Elizabeth II.

A street in the Auckland suburb of Hobsonville is named Frances Bryers Road in her honour.
