= Piet van Asch =

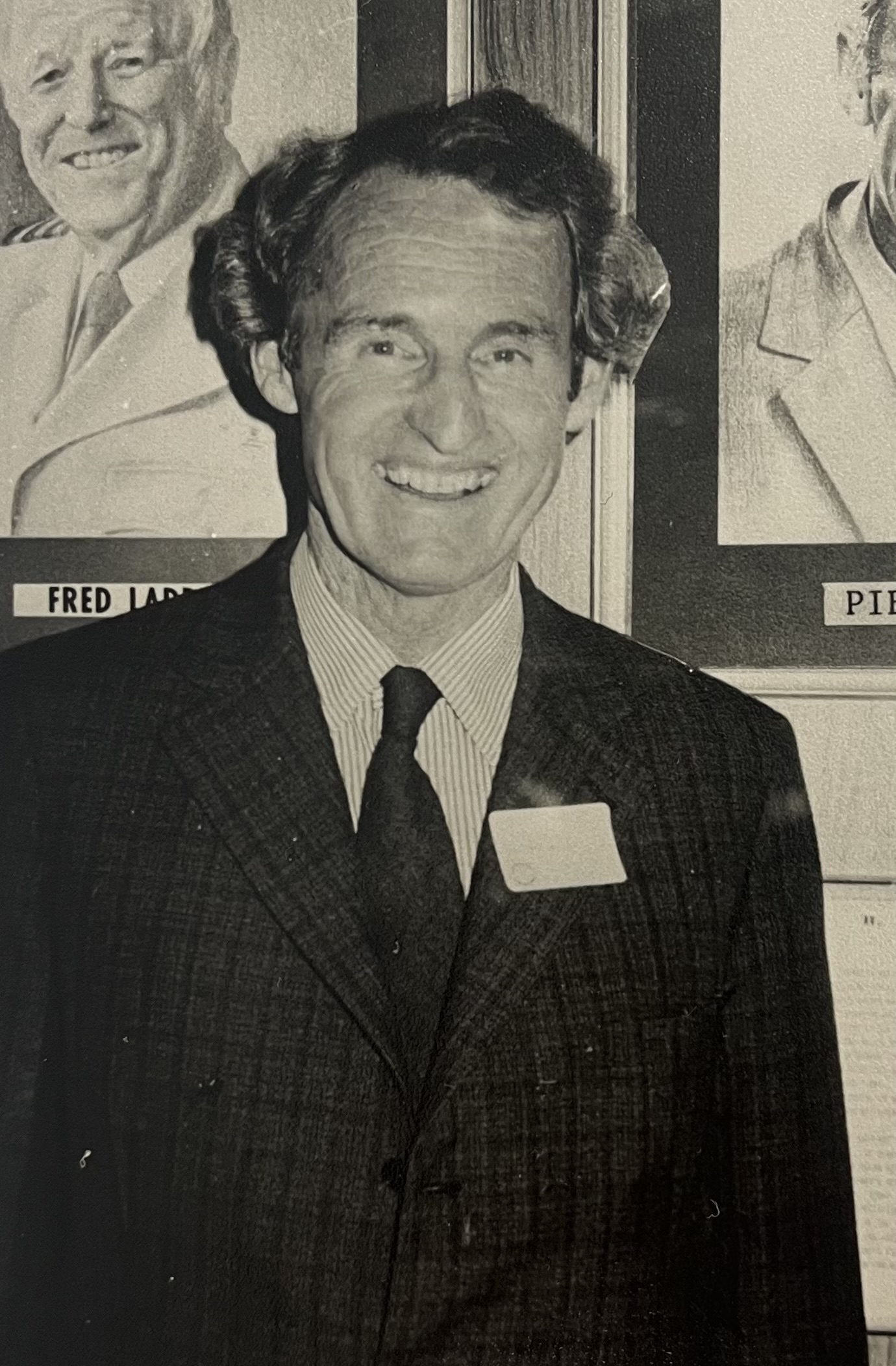
- Piet van Asch at the opening of the MOTAT Pioneers of N.Z. Aviation exhibition, April 1977
- Born: Henry Piet Drury van Asch; 4 May 1911; Waiotara, Wanganui, New Zealand
- Died: 27 October 1996 (aged 85)
- Other name: Piet van Asch

Henry Piet Drury van Asch CBE, most commonly known as Piet van Asch (4 May 1911 – 27 October 1996, in Hastings, New Zealand) was a New Zealand aviator, aerial photographer and surveyor. Van Asch is most notable for establishing New Zealand Aerial Mapping Ltd (NZAM), and was one of the primary figures responsible for establishing the use of aerial photography to create topographical maps.

== Family and early life ==
=== Childhood ===
Piet van Asch (born Henry Piet Drury van Asch) was born on 4 May 1911 in Waitotara, Whanganui, New Zealand. He was one of six children to William and Mattie van Asch (née Jameson). In 1912, when Piet was an infant, the family relocated to a site called Cave Station, outside Havelock North due to the rocky land at Kapara making it difficult to farm. Piet's mother, Mattie rechristened the farm Craggy Range, of which the property and surrounding area is still known.

Piet and his siblings (4 brothers and 1 sister) were predominantly raised by their mother, as William died during the Depression. All of the son's attended Christ's College in Christchurch, which Piet attended from 1925-1929. When he was not at school, he worked on the family farm with his brothers for an income of £1 per week. He was also a junior member of the Craggy Range Rifle Club alongside his brothers, which his mother helped run on their property.

=== Van Asch family ===
The van Asch family was established in 1879 by Piet's grandfather, Gerrit van Asch. Gerrit was born in the Netherlands and migrated to New Zealand after being appointed director of a school to provide free education to those hard of hearing and deaf. Gerrit was trained in Rotterdam in the Oral (German) style of teaching. After the job was advertised, he was the only applicant who applied for the job trained in this method, which appealed to Sir Julius Vogel, then Agent-General for New Zealand in London. Van Asch was determined the best for the New Zealand school, and he established the Sumner School, where he was director until his retirement in 1906. The school was renamed in 1980 to Van Asch College to recognise his contributions.

Gerrit and his wife, Isabella (née Drury) had 9 children. Piet van Asch's father, William was the eldest son. The sons were heavily encouraged to pursue farming, and William attended Lincoln Agricultural College. William began farming with three of his brothers on the banks of Waiotara River, Kapara.

== Early photography and aviation ==
During his teenage years, van Asch developed a strong interest in both photography and flying. An uncle, Gerrit van Asch Jr. was one of the first qualified pilots in New Zealand after gaining a pilots certificate from the Walsh Brothers and Dexter New Zealand Flying School in 1916.

He joined the camera club at Christ's College, and learned the art of photography on a Pocket Kodak. In 1927, he won the Christ's College camera club competition using an Ensign Press camera that his uncle Harry loaned him. Piet would eventually be gifted this camera for winning the competition.

Van Asch returned to Hawke's Bay after graduating from Christ's College. The £1 per week income that Piet was earning working on the farm was insufficient to maintain the expenses required for photography; nor could he save to afford flying lessons. Piet turned to taking photographs of livestock for farmers and for the Hawke's Bay stock journal. In 1931, he attempted oblique aerial photography for the first time. He took aerial photographs of the Whakatu freezing works and was commissioned by the Headmistress of Iona College for an aerial shot to use in the schools' prospectus. Van Asch successfully sold both of these photographs. In 1934, Van Asch sat his 'A' pilot's license in began making a name for himself with oblique aerial photographs, photographing more schools in New Plymouth, Huntly, Inglewood and Whanganui.

== New Zealand Aerial Mapping ==
Van Asch established New Zealand Aerial Mapping Ltd (NZAM) at the end of 1935. Four days after establishing the company, Piet gained shareholder permission to travel to London to purchase an aircraft. After nearly a year in London, in 1936 van Asch purchased a Monospar ST-25 Universal which he named Manu Rere (registered as ZK-AFF).

The Monospar was retired in 1943 and Aerial Mapping took delivery of a Beechcraft AT-11 Kansan, which had been imported by the RNZAF. In 1967, the old Monospar was restored and put back into flying condition, it was the last remaining plane of its sort.

== Personal life and retirement ==
Van Asch married his first wife, Diana (née Wright) in 18 December 1940 at St Luke's Church, Havelock North. They settled in Havelock North and raised three daughters and a son. His son, Hugh van Asch was also involved in New Zealand Aerial Mapping Ltd (NZAM). Outside of work, van Ash enjoyed playing tennis and golf. He was a Rotarian with his membership extending over 50 years. Van Asch's first marriage ended in divorce. On 12 September 1980, he married Dorothy Freda Kennedy (née Ulmer) at Westminster, London before the couple returned to Hawke's Bay.

After having logged over 6700 commercial flying hours van Asch retired in 1980. In 1986, he was involved in the creation of Geoff Conly's book on Aerial Mapping New Zealand; Piet's Eye in the Sky: The story of New Zealand Aerial Mapping.

Van Asch had a keen interest in history, and was a member of the local heritage committee. In 1960, he became director of Hawke's Bay Newspapers, which published the Hawke's Bay Herald-Tribune. In August 1975, he was made a life member of MOTAT, where several items belonging to van Asch and NZAM are now housed and displayed. This included the Manu Ruuri and a Stereoplotter used by NZAM, which are displayed at the Sir Keith Park Memorial Aviation Pavillion.

== Honours and legacy ==
Van Asch was awarded an honorary membership of the New Zealand Institute of Surveyors in 1949. In the 1953 Coronation Honours, van Asch was appointed a Member of the Order of the British Empire, for services to civil aviation, especially in connection with aerial survey. He was promoted to Commander of the Order of the British Empire, for services to aerial mapping, in the 1979 Queen's Birthday Honours.

=== Other professional accolades and contributions ===
- Fellowship of the Royal Aeronautical Society
- Patron of the Hawke's Bay and East Coast Aero Club
- Alfred O. Glasse award of the New Zealand Planning Institute (1975)
- Council member of the Outward Bound Trust of New Zealand

Van Asch died on 27 October 1996, in Hastings. He was survived by his wife, two daughters and a son. New Zealand Aerial Mapping continued until it was sold in 2005. The Company went into liquidation in 2014.
