= Dot McNab =

New Zealand community leader (1921–1995)

Dorothy Pauline McNab OBE (née Lamason; 8 December 1921 – 8 August 1995) was a New Zealand women’s military administrator, political organiser and community leader.

== Early life ==
McNab was born Dorothy Pauline Lamason was born in Napier, New Zealand, on 8 December 1921. After her father died, she left Napier Girls' High School early and became an administrator. She joined the New Zealand Women’s Army Auxiliary Corps (WAAC) clerical division in 1942 and went overseas as part of the Second New Zealand Expeditionary Force in Egypt and Italy.

She married Tom McNab in 1947, and the couple went on to have two sons.

== Political and professional life ==
McNab joined the New Zealand National Party in 1950, and in 1966 she became a Dominion councillor for Balclutha. She provided advice to politicians including Prime Minister Keith Holyoake. In 1976, she was the first woman to chair a division and become a vice president of the National Party.

During the 1970s and 1980s, McNab served as a board member on the New Zealand Broadcasting Corporation, chair of the New Zealand Listener and the New Zealand Lottery Board.

== Honours and awards ==
In the 1979 Queen's Birthday Honours, McNab was appointed an Officer of the Order of the British Empire, for services to the community. She was awarded the Queen Elizabeth II Silver Jubilee Medal in 1977, and the New Zealand Suffrage Centennial Medal in 1993.
