= Bert Bockett =

New Zealand public servant

Herbert Leslie Bockett CMG CStJ (29 June 1905 – 17 October 1980) was a New Zealand public servant. He was born on 29 June 1905. Bockett was responsible for New Zealand's assisted immigration scheme that first attracted British people colloquially known as "Ten Pound Poms" but was later expanded to cover other European countries.

In 1953, Bockett was awarded the Queen Elizabeth II Coronation Medal. In the 1961 New Year Honours, he was appointed as a Companion of the Order of St Michael and St George, in recognition of his service as Secretary of Labour and Director of Employment.

On 30 March 1965, Bockett was appointed as an Officer of the Order of St John and on 19 April 1968 was promoted to Commander of the same order.
