= Michael Rotohiko Jones =

New Zealand government advisor, Māori leader and broadcaster (1895–1978)

Michael Rotohiko Jones CBE MM JP (14 September 1895 – 24 January 1978) was a New Zealand interpreter, land agent, sportsman, private secretary, public administrator and broadcaster.

== Early life ==
Rotohiko was born in Poro-o-Tarao, King Country, New Zealand, on 14 September 1895. Rotohiko's mother, Pare Te Kōrae was descended from the Ngāti Maniapoto iwi. His father, David Lewis, was a Pākehā storekeeper at Poro-o-Tarāo of Jewish descent. They had two sons, Michael Rotohiko, known as 'Mick', and Pei Te Hurinui Jones, who was born in 1898. Lewis did not return to New Zealand after the Second Boer War. Pare Te Kōrae remarried to David Jones, of Ngā Puhi, and both sons adopted their step-father's surname. They moved to Te Kawakawa, where Pare Te Kōrae died in 1915.

Jones attended primary school at Ongarue and Te Kūiti and proceeded to secondary education at Wesley Technical College in Auckland, and the Maori Boys' Agricultural College at Manunui, near at Taumarunui. In World War I he joined the Māori Pioneer Battalion and served on the Western Front from 1916 to 1919, achieving the position of staff sergeant and receiving the Military Medal.

After the war, Jones worked as a land agent in Te Kuiti. In 1922, he moved to Hāwera, Taranaki, and set up his own business, working as a land agent and interpreter. He served on Hāwera's Borough Council and Hospital Board, and as president of the South Taranaki branch of the RSA. He also joined the local Rotary Club and was probably Rotary's first Māori member.

== Career ==
Rotohiko, along with his brother Pei, and Leslie George Kelly, was involved in the Kingitanga, as an advisor to Te Puea of Turangawaewae, the Māori king Korokī Mahuta, and his successor, Queen Te Atairangikaahu. Te Puea, referred to Pei and Rotohiko as "those bloody Hurai" (Jews), as their father was Jewish.

In 1928, the Sim Native Land Confiscation commission recommended that Tainui should be compensated for the land confiscations that followed the invasion of the Waikato in 1863. This initiated a long series of negotiations, in which Jones acted as a negotiator. In 1940, through the intervention of Āpirana Ngata, Jones became the private secretary to the Minister of Native Affairs, then Frank Langstone. He was sometimes referred to as the 'de facto minister' on account of the influence he wielded in this post. In 1946, at Turangawaewae marae in Ngāruawāhia, Jones, his brother Pei, Prime Minister Peter Fraser and Minister of Native Affairs Rex Mason hashed out a settlement deal which became the Waikato-Maniapoto Maori Claims Settlement Act 1946.

Jones and Rangi Royal organised the implementation of the Maori Social and Economic Advancement Act 1945, which led to the establishment of the Maori Women's Welfare League in 1951. Jones was the League's auditor, helping it to develop its initial policy. In 1947, Jones organised the official Tainui party to Tonga for the double royal wedding of Tāufaʻāhau Tupou IV and his brother Fatafehi Tuʻipelehake. He held a string of further positions in the Department of Māori Affairs: Liaison Officer for the minister (1947-1949, 1959-1962), Assistant Controller of the Welfare Division (1950), Employment Officer (1950-1953), and Registrar to the Ikaroa and South Island districts of the Māori Land Court.

He was chairman of the Ngāti Pōneke Māori Association, which represents the Urban Māori of Wellington, from 1950 until he retired in 1962.

Jones was a prominent advocate of the Māori language. He was the examiner of the Māori language University Entrance exam and read the news in Māori on New Zealand radio. He was on the managing board of the journal Te Ao Hou / The New World, sat on the council of the Polynesian Society from 1939 to 1955, and then served as its president.

In 1953, Jones was awarded the Queen Elizabeth II Coronation Medal. In the 1961 New Year Honours, he was appointed an Officer of the Order of the British Empire, for services to the Māori people. In the 1975 Queen's Birthday Honours, he was promoted to Commander of the Order of the British Empire, again for services to the Māori people.

== Personal life ==
Jones married Kahuwaero Hetet (died 1994) at Ongarue on 14 January 1920. They had four sons and three daughters, including Tūtahanga Jones. Jones died at Ōtorohanga on 24 January 1978. He is buried in the military section of the cemetery of Te Tokanganui-a-noho marae, Te Kuiti.
