= Audrey Gale =

New Zealand lawyer, politician, and community leader

Audrey Gale OBE
- Born: Audrey Ngaere Eberlet; 17 March 1909; New Plymouth, New Zealand
- Died: 27 July 1992 (aged 83); New Plymouth, New Zealand

Audrey Ngaere Gale OBE (née Eberlet; 17 March 1909 – 27 July 1992) was a New Zealand lawyer, local politician, and community leader. She was born in New Plymouth on 17 March 1909.

In the 1979 Queen's Birthday Honours, Gale was appointed an Officer of the Order of the British Empire, for services to the community. In 1989, Merrilands Domain in New Plymouth was named Audrey Gale Reserve in recognition of her service to the city and its parks and reserves.
