= 1979 Birthday Honours (New Zealand) =

Awards list for New Zealand

The 1979 Queen's Birthday Honours in New Zealand, celebrating the official birthday of Elizabeth II, were appointments made by the Queen in her right as Queen of New Zealand, on the advice of the New Zealand government, to various orders and honours to reward and highlight good works by New Zealanders. They were announced on 16 June 1979.

The recipients of honours are displayed here as they were styled before their new honour.

== Knight Bachelor ==
- Lewis Edward Harris OBE – of Puketapu. For services to handicapped people and the community.
- (Mountford) Tosswill Woollaston – of Motueka. For services to art.
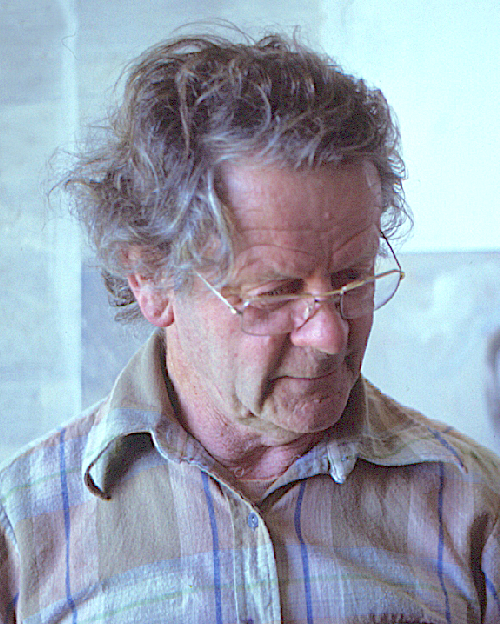
Sir Toss Woollaston

== Order of Saint Michael and Saint George ==
=== Companion (CMG) ===
- Lloyd Gilbert Brown – of Wellington. For services to manufacturing and development of energy resources.
- James Hunter Gemmell – of Auckland. For services to manufacturing and export.
- George Hamish Ormond Wilson – of Wellington. For services as chairman of the New Zealand Historic Places Trust and the board of trustees of the National Art Gallery and Museum.
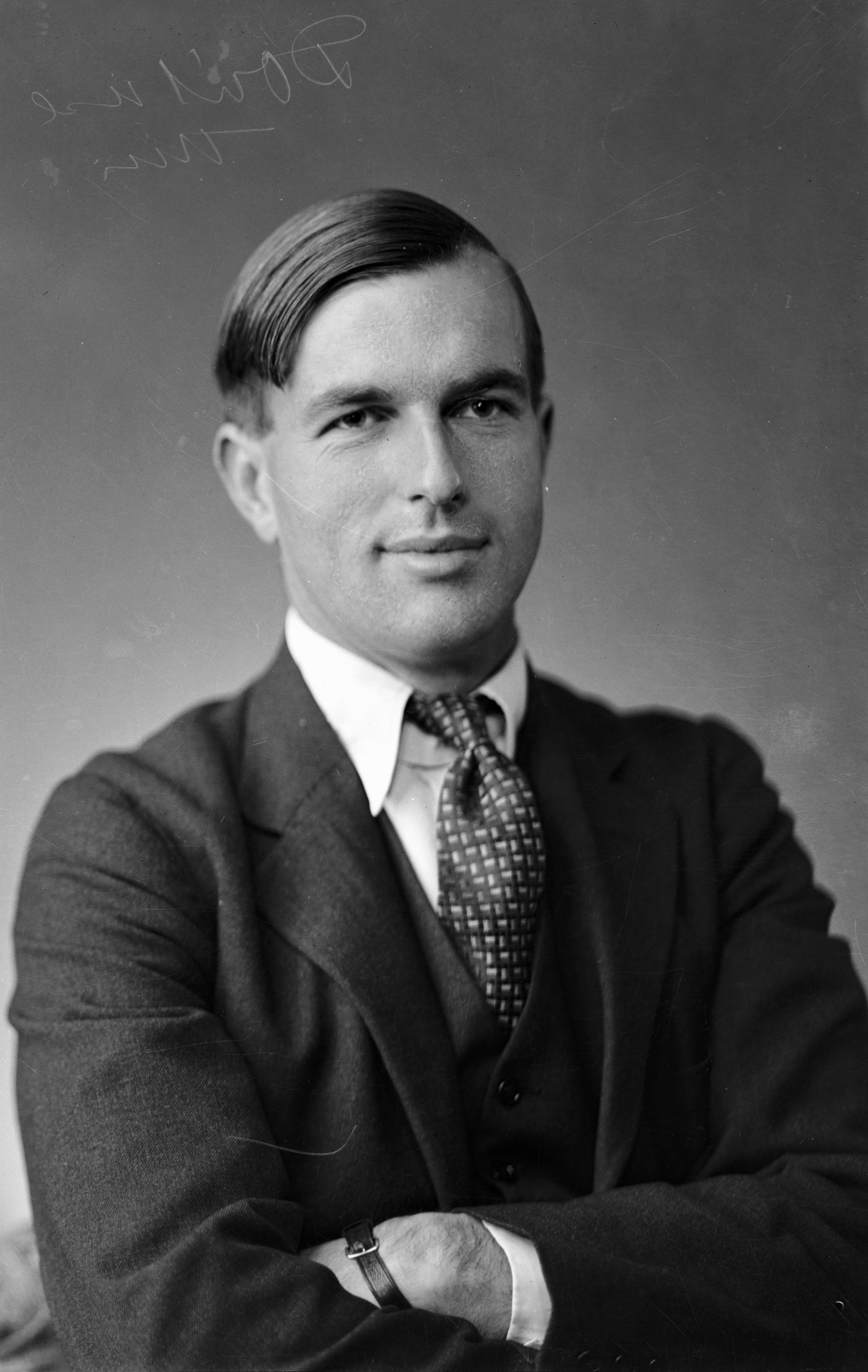
Ormond Wilson

== Royal Victorian Order ==
=== Knight Commander (KCVO) ===
- The Very Reverend Martin Gloster Sullivan – of Auckland, formerly of London; Dean of St Paul's Cathedral, London, 1967–1977.

== Order of the British Empire ==
=== Dame Commander (DBE) ===
Civil division

- Daphne Helen Purves – of Dunedin. For services to the International and New Zealand Federations of University Women.

=== Knight Commander (KBE) ===
Civil division

- Arthur Hugh Ward OBE – of Waikanae. For services to the dairy industry and education.

Military division

- Air Marshal Richard Bruce Bolt CB CBE DFC AFC – Chief of Defence Staff.
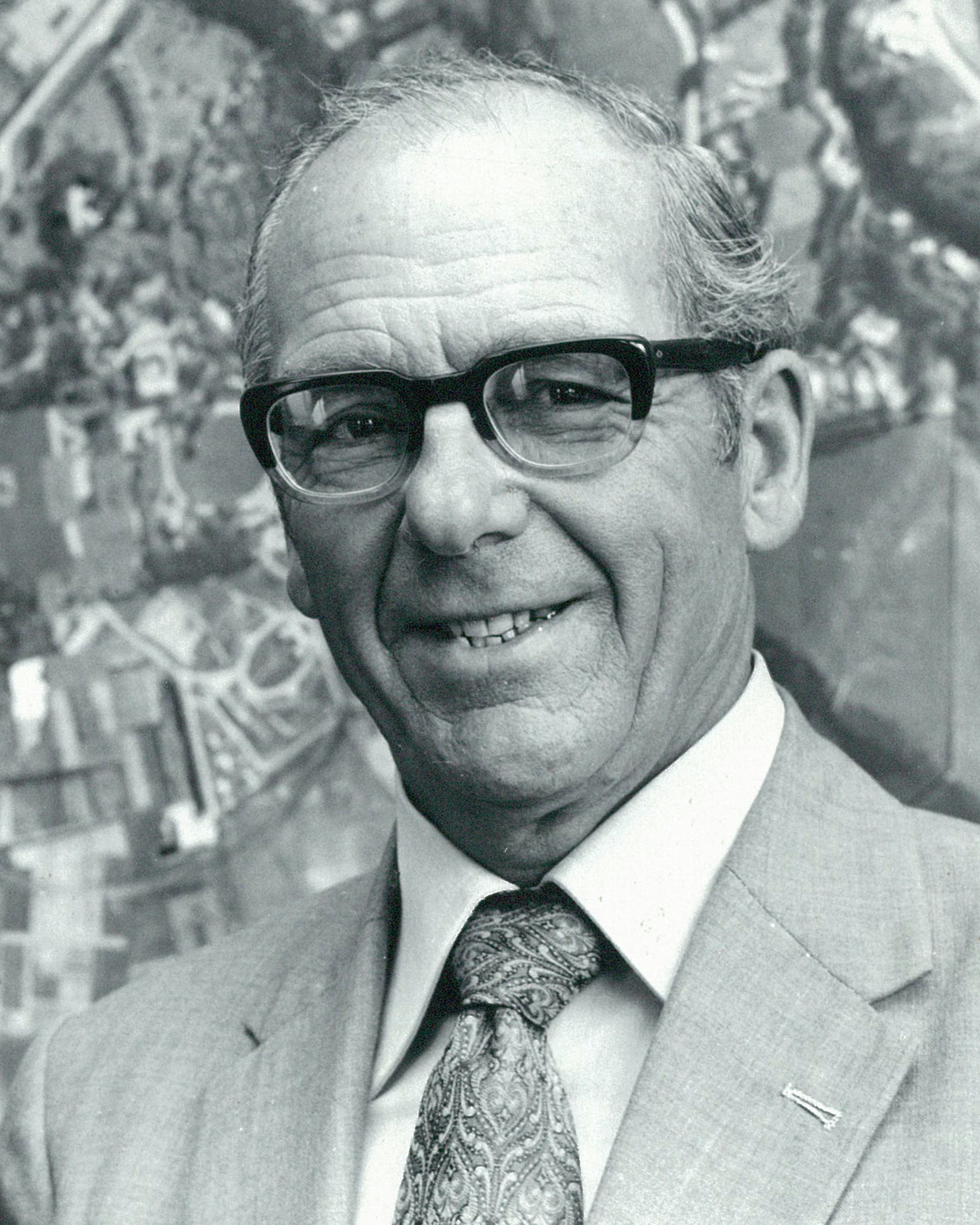
Sir Arthur Ward

=== Commander (CBE) ===
Civil division

- Margaret Hazel Cotterill – of Plimmerton. For services to the YWCA.
- John Keith Dobson – of Auckland. For services to business management.
- Grace Shellie Hollander JP – of Christchurch. For services to the National Council of Women and the community.
- Oswald Henry Jackson JP – of Greymouth. For services to local-body and community affairs.
- Donald David Rowlands MBE – of Auckland. For services to rowing.
- Henry Piet Drury Van Asch MBE – of Havelock North. For services to aerial mapping.

Military division

- Commodore Roy Herbert Longland Humby – Royal New Zealand Navy.

=== Officer (OBE) ===
Civil division

- James Neil Aitken – of Patearoa. For services to hydatid research and eradication.
- William Stewart Armitage – of Dunedin. For services to the community.
- Malcolm Cort Astley JP – of Auckland. For services as a stipendiary magistrate and to the community.
- Thomas James Atchison – of Ngāruawāhia. For services to riding.
- Audrey Ngaere Gale – of New Plymouth. For services to the community.
- Maxwell Ian Hume – of Lower Hutt; lately Deputy Assistant Commissioner, New Zealand Police.
- Timothy Hurley – of Wanganui. For services to the tourist and travel industry.
- Dr Norris Roy Jefferson ED – of Invercargill. For services to paraplegics, sport and medicine.
- Edward Anthony Kennedy – of Paraparaumu Beach; lately deputy chairman, State Services Commission.
- Dorothy Pauline McNab – of Balclutha. For services to the community.
- (James Frank) Edgar Mansfield – of Napier. For services as a bookbinder and sculptor.
- Maurice Noel Manthel – of Wellington. For services to the community.
- William Gordon Nolan JP – of Wairoa. For services to sport and the community.
- Edward Ronald Prince – of Wanganui. For services to sport and the community.
- Lieutenant Commander Peter Maxwell Sanders MBE – of Wellington; New Zealand Cadet Forces.
- Arthur Frederick Thomas – of Auckland. For services to local government.
- Lawrence David Tinkham – of Wellington. For services to the performing arts.
- Emeritus Professor John Le Bailly Warren – of Dunedin; lately dean, University of Otago Dental School.

Military division

- Commander William Ferguson Jaques – Royal New Zealand Navy.
- Colonel Ian Hamilton Burrows MC – Colonels' List, New Zealand Army.
- Group Captain Arthur Gilbert Tringham – Royal New Zealand Air Force.
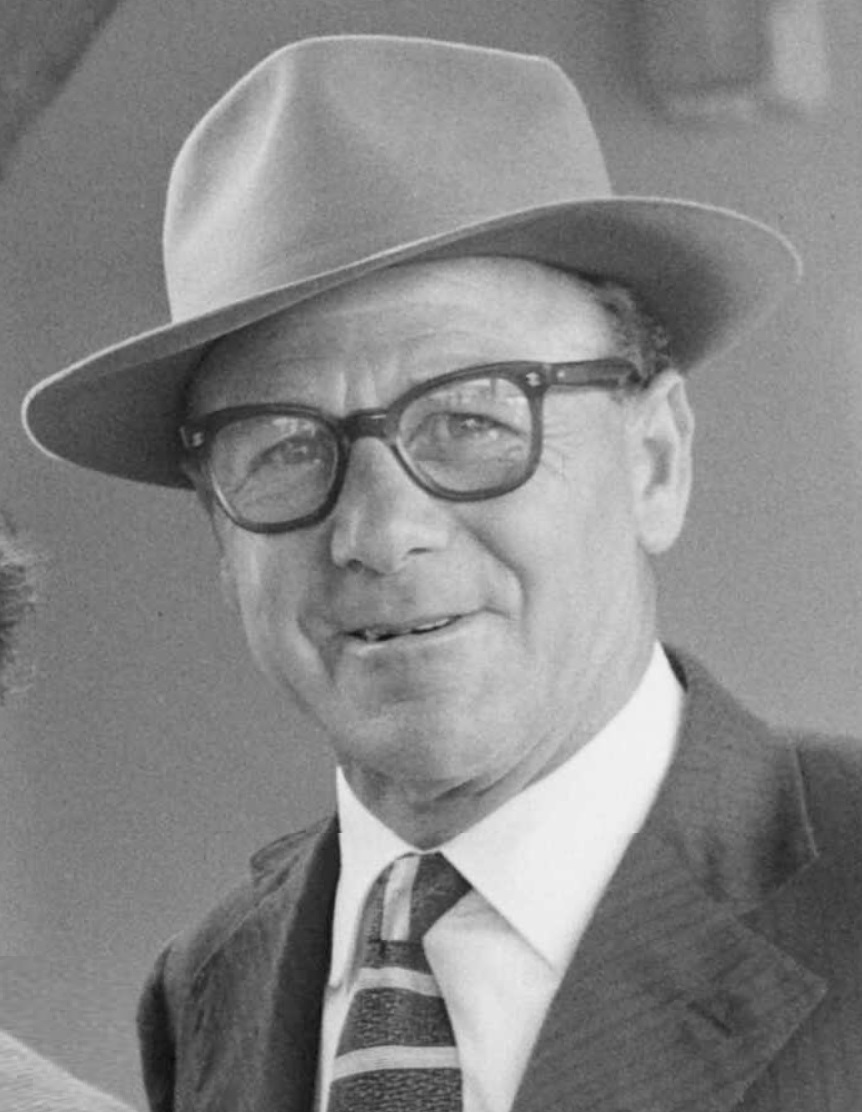
Noel Manthel

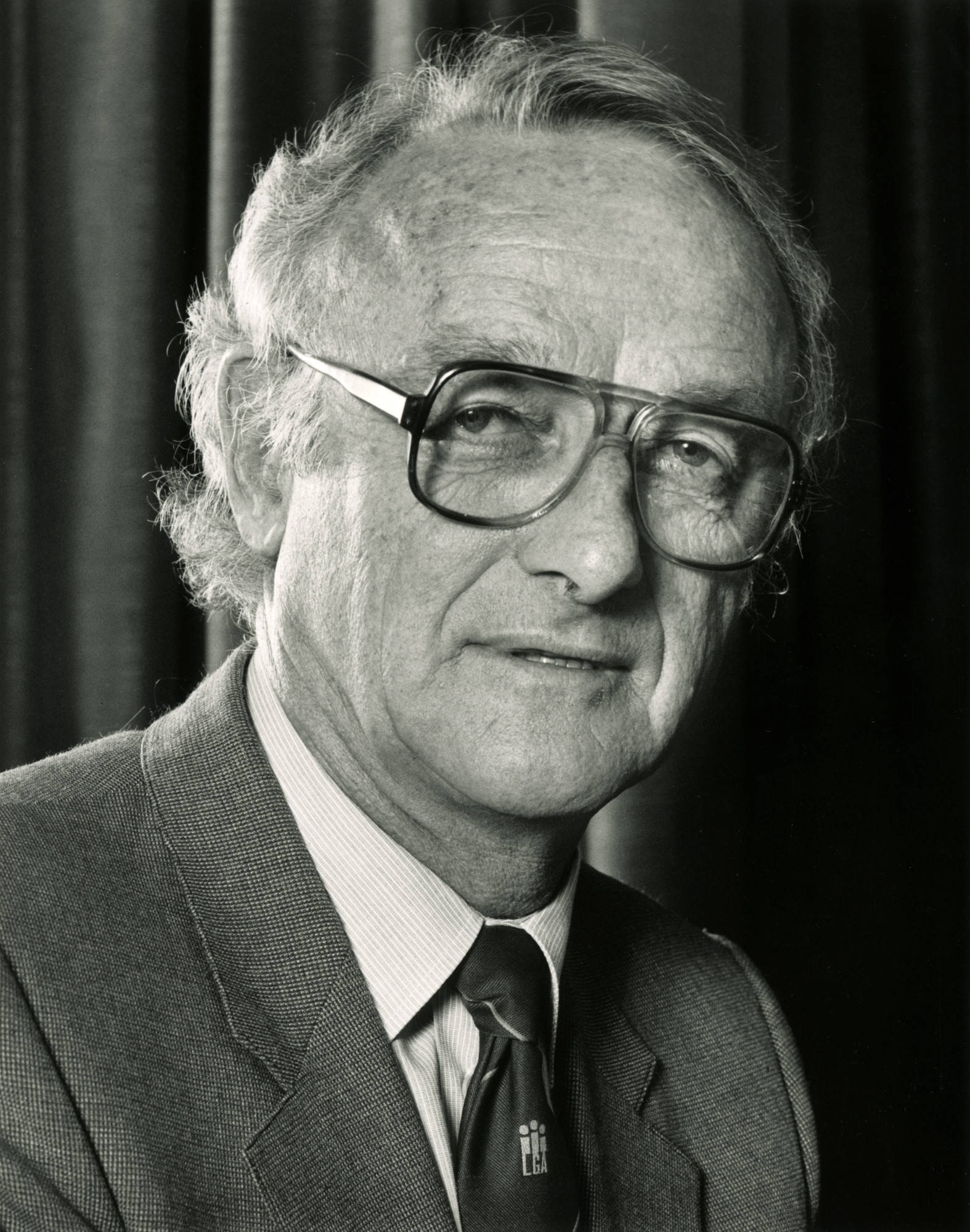
Fred Thomas

=== Member (MBE) ===
Civil division

- Gary Thomas William Butler – of Wanganui. For services to the community.
- John Morton Dickey JP – of Auckland. For services to the pharmaceutical profession, sport and community.
- Robert Dossor – of Picton. For services to the province of Marlborough.
- Charles Dudley – of Remuera. For services to racing and trotting.
- Alan Falconer Fraser – of Rangiora. For services to sport.
- Betty Fraser – of Wellington; lately principal, Wellington Girls' College.
- Abraham Saul Goldsmith JP – of Wellington. For services to the community.
- Rupert Garth Harris – of Christchurch. For services to diabetics.
- Phyllis Mary Holley – of Dunedin. For services to sport.
- Hugh Janson – of Carterton. For services to speech and drama teaching and the community.
- Robert Dickson Jennings – of Auckland. For services to children.
- Linda Christine Jones – of Cambridge. For services as a jockey.
- Edward Joseph Lynskey – of Wellington. For services as commissioner for the Chatham Islands.
- Rona Iris McCarthy – of Hastings. For services to sport, especially netball.
- Isabelle Vincente Major – of Dunedin. For services to singing.
- Robert Kenneth Malcolm – of Ōpōtiki. For services to the dairy industry.
- Campbell George Paterson JP – of Auckland. For services to philately.
- George Ernest Perry – of Trentham. For services to the community, especially surf lifesaving and water safety.
- John Pym Gray Pring – of Auckland. For services to rugby refereeing.
- Thomas Ram – of Taumarunui. For services to the community.
- Richard Newell Stevenson JP – of Auckland. For services to the Cancer Society of New Zealand.
- Clifford Vincent Tait – of Hamilton. For services to aviation.
- John Osborne Taylor – of Christchurch. For services to horticulture.
- Roi Carl Te Punga – of Wellington; lately assistant director-general, Department of Social Welfare.
- Roy Blount Walker – of Dunedin. For services to the theatre.
- Keith Albert Fabian Wills – of Hamilton. For services to the community.

Military division

- Warrant Officer Radio Electrical Mechanician John Clive Lippross – Royal New Zealand Navy.
- Warrant Officer Marine Engineering Artificer John Russell Thorburn – Royal New Zealand Navy.
- Major Donald Houlton Crabb – Royal New Zealand Armoured Corps (Territorial Force).
- Warrant Officer Class 2 Patt Dillon MM – Royal New Zealand Army Service Corps.
- Lieutenant and Quartermaster Frederick Sydney Leef – Royal New Zealand Army Service Corps.
- Warrant Officer Harold Douglas Lazarus – Royal New Zealand Air Force.
- Flight Lieutenant Charles Benedict Raddock – Royal New Zealand Air Force.
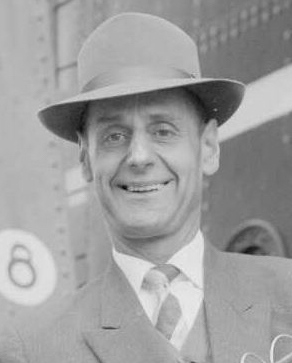
Saul Goldsmith

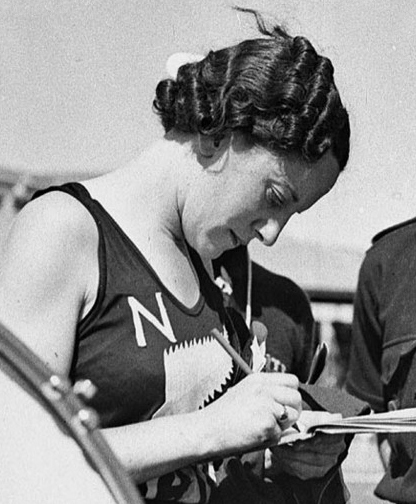
Rona McCarthy

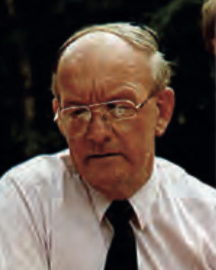
Don Crabb

== British Empire Medal (BEM) ==
Military division

- Medical Chief Petty Officer William Charles Filmer – Royal New Zealand Navy.
- Chief Petty Officer Marine Engineering Mechanician First Class Denis Michael Shaw – Royal New Zealand Navy.
- Temporary Staff Sergeant Charles Frederick Boyes – Royal New Zealand Army Service Corps (Territorial Force).
- Sergeant John Frederick Hayward – Royal New Zealand Infantry Regiment.
- Corporal Brian Ramsay – Royal New Zealand Infantry Regiment.
- Sergeant Kenneth Sydney John Dell – Royal New Zealand Air Force.
- Flight Sergeant John Karatu Rotia Rogers – Royal New Zealand Air Force.

== Companion of the Queen's Service Order (QSO) ==
=== For community service ===
- Dorothy Elizabeth Jane Dolan – of Methven.
- Noel Alfred Kidd – of Pukekohe.
- Emily Pehipa Matiu Paki JP – of Huntly.
- Alfred Lorraine Williams JP – of Auckland.

=== For public services ===
- Rex Douglas Allen – of Oamaru; mayor of Oamaru.
- John Simeon Blenkhorn – of Levin.
- Wallace Colin Thomas Brunton – of Thames.
- Mervyn Mackie Chisholm MBE – of Blenheim; lately supervisor manager, Molesworth Station.
- Lester Laurence Davis – of Wellington; government insurance commissioner since 1973.
- Beryl Overton Howie – of Ludhiana, India; professor of obstetrics and gynaecology, Christian Medical College, Ludhiana.
- Pita Tipunakore Kaua JP – of Gisborne.
- Edward Conway Keating – of Upper Hutt; government printer since 1976.
- Emere Makere Waiwaha Kaa Mountain JP – of Kawakawa.
- James Humphrey Rose – of Auckland.
- Iver Edgar Trask – of Paraparaumu; lately deputy general manager, New Zealand Railways.

== Queen's Service Medal (QSM) ==
=== For community service ===
- George Livingston Baker – of Pātea.
- Margaret Alice Mary Bear JP – of Lowry Bay.
- Maude Harriett Lowry Bedingham – of Auckland.
- Kathleen D'bett Cottrell – of Mount Maunganui.
- Audree Clarence Larraine Curtis – of Pukahu.
- Gladys Annie Freeland – of Palmerston.
- Kelvin Robert Gay – of Nelson.
- Olive Victoria Gordon – of Roxburgh East.
- Elsie Grieve – of Dannevirke.
- Rita Henry – of Wairoa.
- Joan Phyllis Irvine – of Dannevirke.
- Everard Stanley Martin Kell – of Auckland.
- Ludwik Kowalczyk – of Petone.
- Nathan Roy Low – of New Plymouth.
- Margaret Anne Lynch – of Rotorua.
- Margaret McDonald – of Tapanui.
- Herbert Walter North JP – of Tokanui.
- Robert Allen Rogers – of Hamilton.
- Annie Schuler JP – of Auckland.
- George Alexander Telfer – of Ōtorohanga.
- Phyllis Ada Thomason – of Motueka.

=== For public services ===
- Dr Deidre Morag Airey – of Coromandel.
- Alfred George Barwell – of Dunsandel.
- Thomas Edward Bowe – constable, New Zealand Police.
- Isabel May Charles JP – of Silverstream.
- Russell Harold Coombe – of Auckland.
- Josephine Corbett – of Thames; lately supervising principal nurse, Thames Hospital Board.
- Eileen Vera Crosby JP – of Hāwera.
- William Thomas Earley – of Invercargill.
- Warren John Ellis – of Taupō.
- Joseph Grbavac – of Kumeū.
- Peter James Hurley – of Kotemaori; line ganger, Electricity Division, Ministry of Energy.
- Lorna Winifred Leman – of Pukekohe.
- Alexander James Leyland – constable, New Zealand Police.
- Michael Lawrence Moloney – of Hastings.
- Stanley Tetekura Newton JP – of Rotorua.
- Phyllis Margaret Rolls – of Masterton.
- Patricia Anne Rowell – of Timaru.
- Francis Leslie Smith JP – of Blenheim.
- John Walker – of Waitahuna.

== Royal Red Cross ==
=== Associate (ARRC) ===
- Captain Bruce Derby Rennie – Royal New Zealand Nursing Corps.

== Queen's Fire Service Medal (QFSM) ==
- Arthur James Easton – chief fire officer, Levin Volunteer Fire Brigade.
- William Girling-Butcher – chief fire control officer, New Zealand Forest Service, Wellington.
- Geoffrey Cyril Stephens – chief fire officer, Blenheim Volunteer Fire Brigade.
- Ian James Walker – chief fire officer, Lower Hutt Fire Brigade.
- Albert William White – station officer (volunteer), Napier Fire Brigade.

== Queen's Police Medal (QPM) ==
- Brian Wilkinson – detective chief superintendent, New Zealand Police.

== Air Force Cross (AFC) ==
- Lieutenant Adrian Grey Tunnicliffe – Royal New Zealand Navy.
- Squadron Leader Carey William Adamson – Royal New Zealand Air Force.

== Queen's Commendation for Valuable Service in the Air ==
- Sergeant Robert Keith Foreman – Royal New Zealand Air Force.
- Master Engineer Robert John Moody – Royal New Zealand Air Force.
- Sergeant Barry James Woodcock – Royal New Zealand Air Force.
