= Arthur Ward (dairy researcher) =

New Zealand accountant (1906–1993)

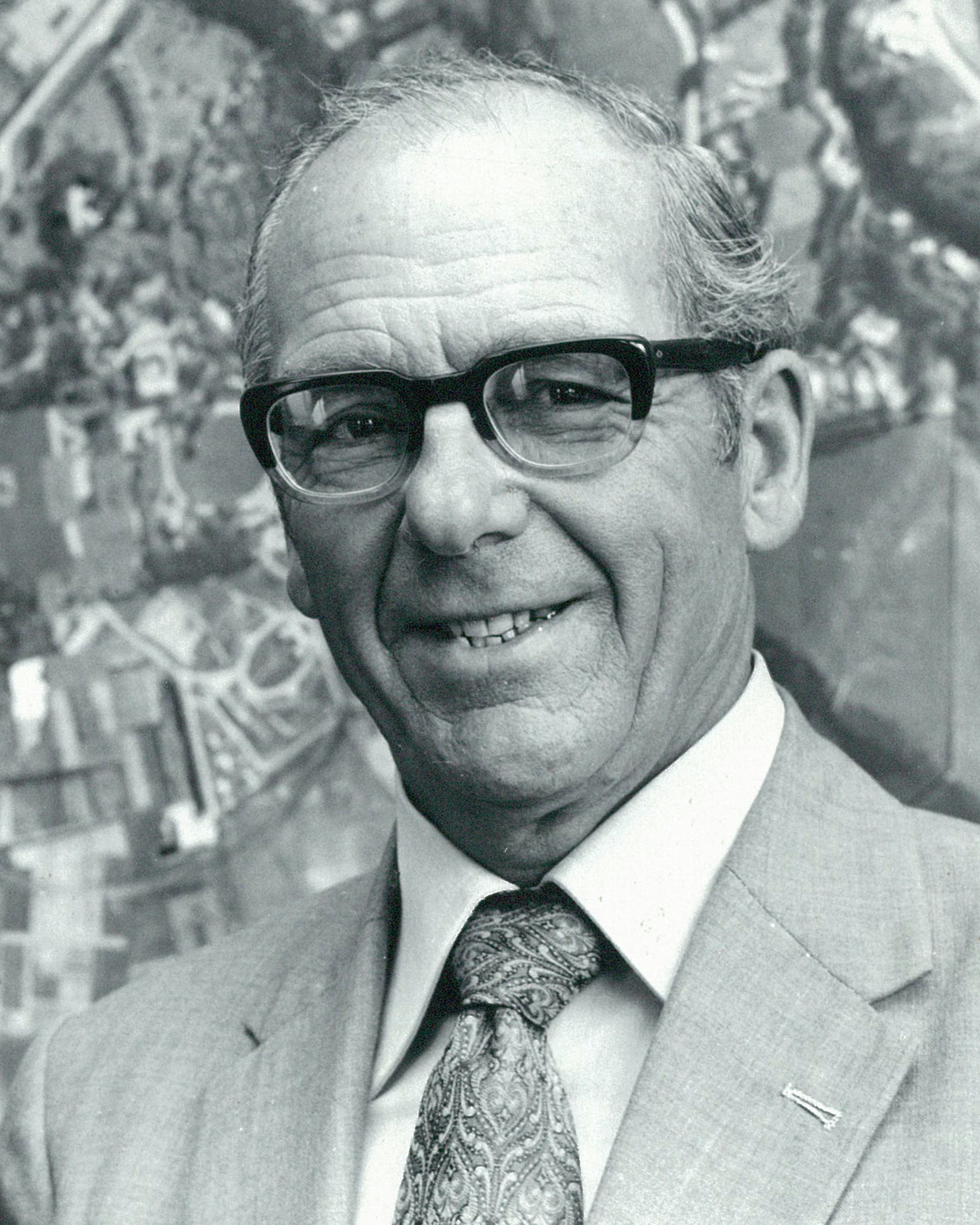
Ward in 1976

Sir Arthur Hugh Ward KBE (25 March 1906 – 1 November 1993) was a New Zealand accountant, dairy researcher and administrator, company director and university chancellor. He was born in Spalding, Lincolnshire, England, in 1906.

Ward was chancellor of Massey University from 1976 to 1980. In the 1961 New Year Honours, Ward was appointed an Officer of the Order of the British Empire, for services to the dairy industry, and he was promoted to Knight Commander of the same order, for services to the dairy industry and education, in the 1979 Queen's Birthday Honours. He was awarded an honorary DSc by Massey University in 1991.
