= Renton Hardware building =

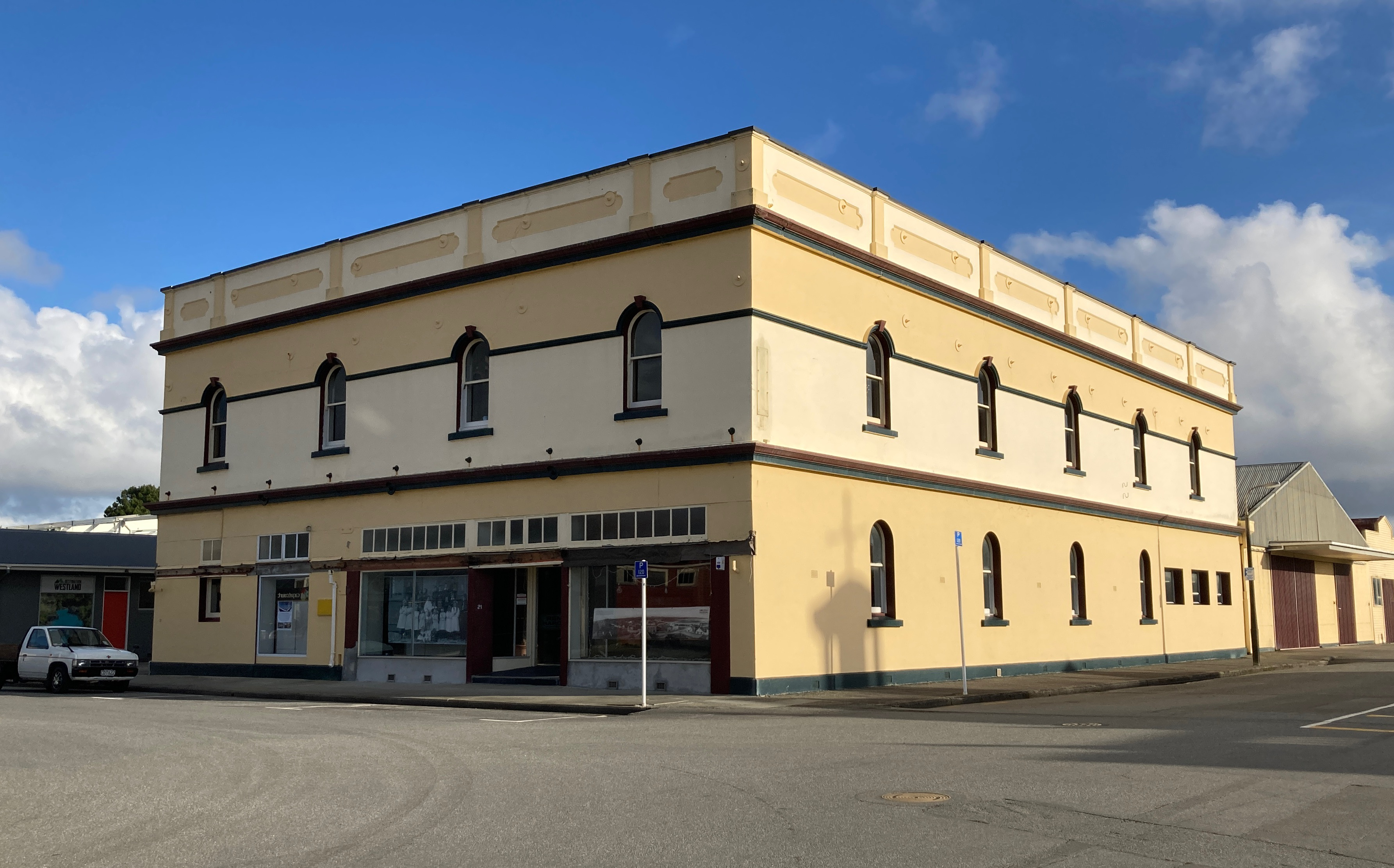
- Renton Hardware building in 2020

General information
- Type: Commercial
- Architectural style: Neoclassical
- Address: 21 Hamilton Street
- Town or city: Hokitika
- Country: New Zealand
- Coordinates: 42°43′7.44″S 170°57′42.08″E
- Opened: 1908

Technical details
- Material: Plastered brick

Design and construction
- Architect(s): Arthur Griffin
- Main contractor: Stevenson and McMillan

Heritage New Zealand – Category 2
- Designated: 21 September 1989
- Reference no.: 5050

The Renton Hardware building, also known as the Okitiki building, is a commercial building in Hokitika, on the West Coast of New Zealand's South Island. Completed in 1908, the building was designed by architect Arthur Griffin, who was also responsible for the nearby Carnegie library. In 1989, the Renton building was granted historic place category 2 status by Heritage New Zealand.

== Context ==
The Coach and Horses Hotel, which stood on the corner of Hamilton and Tancred Streets in Hokitika, was purchased by blacksmith James Renton in the 1870s. He used the ground floor for his business, Renton and Company, which expanded to encompass ironmongery and the importing and retailing of general merchandise. The upper floor of the former hotel became family accommodation. As the business grew, Renton and Co. purchased several adjacent properties, and in 1898 James Renton passed the ownership of the company to his six sons, while retaining a managerial role. In February 1906, the firm announced its intention to replace their existing premises with a new, larger building in brick to meet the needs of their expanding business.

== Architecture ==
Young Nelson-based architect Arthur Griffin was engaged to design the new building. Griffin, then aged 22, had recently won a competition for the design of the new Carnegie library in Hokitika on a site directly across the street. Tenders for the construction of the new Renton building were called for in June 1907, and construction was completed by local contractors Stevenson and McMillan the following year.

As the new shop and warehouse was nearing completion in January 1908, the West Coast Times described the new building as "assuming imposing proportions, and when finished will be classed amongst the finest business premises on the West Coast". The two-storey plastered brick building, rectangular in plan, was designed in neoclassical style, although much more utilitarian and less ornamented than Griffin's recently completed library nearby. However, it shared the distinctive semi-circular arch-head windows with central keystones with the Carnegie library, while the exterior cornices of the Renton building were simpler and lacked the classical dentils of those of the library.

== Current status ==
In 1945, the company became known as the Renton Hardware Company Limited, and in 1989, the Renton Hardware building received historic place category 2 classification by the New Zealand Historic Places Trust (now Heritage New Zealand).

The property was still owned by the Renton family in 2015, when they sought a resource consent from Westland District Council to demolish the building as part of a proposed sale to Griffen and Smith Mitre 10, conditional on the resource consent being granted to make way for a car park. A seismic assessment by a structural engineer, submitted during the resource consent process, rated the building's structural strength as 10 per cent of the current new building standard and estimated that remediation could cost up to $1 million. After hearings by an independent commissioner, the resource consent was granted. An appeal was taken to the Environment Court by objectors, and an agreement was reached in August 2016 between the Renton family interests and the appellants for the latter to purchase the building with the intention of preserving it as part of a proposed heritage precinct.

The new owners obtained their own seismic assessment of the building, putting it at 40 per cent of new building strength. They renamed the building the Okitiki building (Okitiki being a corruption of the name Hokitika used by early European settlers), and undertook work to waterproof and insulate the roof, stiffen the parapets, replace the roof cladding and replace the verandah, bringing the building to 67 per cent of new building strength.
