= Richard House =

Author, film maker, and artist

Richard House is an author, film maker, and artist. He was born in Cyprus.

His first novel, Bruiser, was short-listed for the Ferro-Grumley Gay Fiction Award in 1998. His latest novel, The Kills, was longlisted for the 2013 Man Booker Prize.

From 1988 to 2008, Richard was part of an art collaborative called Haha, along with Wendy Jacob, A. Laurie Palmer, and John Ploof.

He graduated from the School of the Art Institute of Chicago and completed his PhD in creative writing at the University of East Anglia in 2009. He is currently a Senior Lecturer at the University of Birmingham.

== Novels ==
- 2002: Bruiser
- 2002: Uninvited
- 2013: The Kills
- 2027: Dishonest Days
