= Larry Palmer =

Larry Palmer may refer to:

- Larry Leon Palmer, American diplomat
- Lawrence Palmer, known as Larry, American ice hockey goaltender

== See also ==
- A. Laurie Palmer, American artist, writer, and activist
