= Birnam Wood (novel) =

2023 novel by Eleanor Catton

- First hardcover edition
- Author: Eleanor Catton
- Cover artist: Jon Gray (aka gray318)
- Language: English
- Publisher: Te Herenga Waka University Press (NZ); Granta Books (UK); FSG (US)
- Publication date: February 2023 (NZ); 28 February 2023 (INTL)
- Publication place: New Zealand
- Media type: Print; e-book
- Pages: 432 pp.
- ISBN: 978-1-77692-063-1
- OCLC: 1376194338

Birnam Wood is the third novel by New Zealand writer Eleanor Catton. Published in February 2023, the novel follows members of guerilla gardening collective Birnam Wood as, with the help of a charismatic tech billionaire, they undertake a new project on abandoned farmland.

Like her previous novel The Luminaries, the book is set in a fictionalised New Zealand, primarily in and around a national park in the South Canterbury region. The title is taken from a line in Macbeth.

== Plot ==
Mira Bunting and Shelley Noakes are members of Birnam Wood, a gardening collective who plant and tend illegal gardens around Christchurch. While reading about a landslide blocking the Korowai Pass Road, Mira sees an opportunity for the group in a seemingly abandoned farm in the nearby rural town of Thorndike. The farm's owner is Owen Darvish, an entrepreneur and conservationist. Mira takes a trip to the farm to scope out the land, but is discovered by Robert Lemoine, a tech billionaire to whom Darvish has sold the land. Unknown to Darvish, Lemoine is illegally mining rare earth minerals in the Korowai National park, causing widespread environmental damage. Lemoine agrees to allow Birnam Wood to set up a garden on the property, and to provide financial support, promising not to inform Darvish of their activity.

Mira outlines her idea to the Birnam Wood group, who agree to undertake the project. This raises the ire of former member Tony Gallo, who believes working with the billionaire is a betrayal of the group's left-wing values. Suspicious of Lemoine, he makes a trip to Thorndike where he finds a highly guarded 'research area' in the national park, which Darvish is not aware of. Later, Tony notices Lemoine is tracking him through the park using drones.

At Darvish's farm, Lemoine gives the Birnam Wood members LSD, while he and Mira remain sober. Darvish unexpectedly returns home, and is killed by Shelley who accidentally runs him over while tripping. Lemoine sends Mira and Shelley to a safehouse and arranges for Darvish's death to appear accidental.

Meanwhile, Tony enters the research area and discovers Lemoine's mining operation. He is pursued by Lemoine's hired paramilitary and injures himself while escaping. He eventually makes it back to the farm and relays what he has learnt to Mira. They are both discovered by Lemoine.

Suspicious of the circumstances of her husband's death, Jill Darvish travels to Thorndike. She nervously explores the property armed with a hunting rifle when she discovers the members of Birnam Wood are dead, having been poisoned with 1080 by Lemoine, who intends to frame Tony. She shoots and kills Lemoine, and is then herself killed by his security guard.

Tony, now mortally wounded, escapes and drags himself up to Lemoine's mining operation, which he sets alight.

== Reception ==
Writing in The New York Times, Dwight Garner praised Catton's dialogue, saying of her characters "They talk the way real people talk, but they’re freer, ruder, funnier." Alex Preston in The Observer said the conclusion caused him to reevaluate the events in the rest of the novel, saying it "propels it from a merely very good book into a truly great one."

Writing for NPR, John Powers contrasts the novel with Catton's previous, The Luminaries, describing it as "shapelier and more conventional." While not explicitly Victorian in style as The Luminaries is, Powers finds similarities with the writing of Jane Austen and George Eliot in Birnam Wood.

In a starred review, Kirkus Reviews said the novel is "A story that’s suspended on a tightrope just above nihilism, and readers will hold their breath until the last page to see whether Catton will fall. This blistering look at the horrors of late capitalism manages to also be a wildly fun read." Publishers Weekly also gave the novel a starred review, noting "Catton injects granular details into her depiction of mining’s impact on the land and those who tend to it, and she pulls a taut, suspenseful story from the tangle of vivid characters. Thanks to a convincing backdrop of ecological peril, Catton’s human drama is made even more acute."

Birnam Wood was the best selling book published in New Zealand in 2023.

== Awards and honours ==
Birnam Wood featured in The Guardian's "The best fiction of 2023" and The Atlantic's "The 10 Best Books of 2023" list. It was also included on Barack Obama's 2023 Summer reading list.

Awards for Birnam Wood
Year	Award	Category	Result	Ref.
2023	Giller Prize	—	Shortlisted	
2023	Goodreads Choice Awards	Fiction	Nominated–15th	
2023	Kirkus Prize	Fiction	Finalist	
2023	Libby Award	Adult Fiction	Shortlisted	
2023	Nero Award	Fiction	Shortlisted	
2023	Orwell Prize	Political Fiction	Finalist	
2024	Audie Award	Fiction	Finalist	
2024	Carol Shields Prize for Fiction	—	Shortlisted	
2024	International Dublin Literary Award	—	Longlisted	
2024	Jann Medlicott Acorn Prize	Fiction	Shortlisted	
2024	Ned Kelly Awards	International Crime Fiction	Shortlisted	
	Ockham New Zealand Book Awards	Fiction	Shortlisted	
