= The Luminaries =

2013 novel by Eleanor Catton

- First hardcover edition
- Author: Eleanor Catton
- Cover artist: Jenny Grigg
- Language: English
- Published: 2013 Victoria University Press (New Zealand), Granta Books (UK), Little, Brown and Company (US), McClelland & Stewart (Canada)
- Publication place: New Zealand
- Media type: Print; e-book
- Pages: 848 pp.
- Awards: Booker Prize; 2013
- ISBN: 978-1-84708-431-6
- OCLC: 851827301

The Luminaries is a 2013 novel by Eleanor Catton. Set in New Zealand's South Island in 1866, the novel follows Walter Moody, a prospector who travels to the West Coast settlement of Hokitika to make his fortune on the goldfields. Instead, he stumbles into a tense meeting between twelve local men, and is drawn into a complex mystery involving a series of unsolved crimes. The novel's complex structure is based on the system of Western astrology, with each of the twelve local men representing one of the twelve signs of the zodiac, and with another set of characters representing planets in the Solar System.

The novel has won many awards and honours, including the 2013 Booker Prize. It was adapted into the BBC/TVNZ miniseries The Luminaries in 2020. In 2022, it was included on the "Big Jubilee Read" list of 70 books by Commonwealth authors, selected to celebrate the Platinum Jubilee of Elizabeth II.

== Plot ==
The story begins with one of the book's protagonists, Walter Moody, arriving in the smoking room of the Crown Hotel after having encountered a horrific sight on his ship to Hokitika. There, he meets the twelve men who become the other protagonists of the book: Te Rau Tauwhare (a Māori greenstone hunter), Charlie Frost (a banker), Edgar Clinch (an hotelier), Benjamin Lowenthal (a newspaperman), Cowell Devlin (a chaplain), Sook Yongsheng (a hatter), Aubert Gascoigne (a justice's clerk), Joseph Pritchard (a chemist), Thomas Balfour (a shipping agent), Harald Nilssen (a commission merchant), Quee Long (a goldsmith), and Dick Mannering (a goldfields magnate).

The twelve men inform Walter Moody about the mysterious events that have happened leading up to the current night, from their different perspectives. Some two weeks previously, Crosbie Wells, a little-known hermit, was found dead in his cabin by a politician named Alistair Lauderback on his way into town. Wells' death was apparently peaceful, but upon inspection, his cabin had several thousand pounds' worth of gold hidden inside it, as well as an unsigned deed (witnessed by Wells) which suggested that Emery Staines, a rich and likeable young man, was to pay £2,000 to Anna Wetherell, a prostitute well-known for frequenting the Chinatown areas of Hokitika. Upon the same night as Wells' body was found, Staines himself had disappeared, and Wetherell was found lying in the road unconscious, having apparently attempted suicide. She and Gascoigne discovered the next day that hundreds of pounds' worth of gold has been sewn into the lining of her dress by an unknown person.

The council has met to discuss these and subsequent events, and the man who appears to be at the centre of all these occurrences is Francis Carver, a violent and scarred man who captained the Godspeed, the ship in which Moody came to Hokitika, and who, nine months previously in Dunedin, had cheated Lauderback out of that same ship using the false name of Francis Crosbie Wells. Carver had blackmailed Lauderback by hiding a fortune of gold inside a shipment of five dresses under Lauderback's name; if Lauderback refused to give Carver the ship, Carver would have Lauderback arrested and imprisoned for smuggling undeclared gold. However, the shipping crate disappeared and washed up ashore, forcing Carver to arrive in Hokitika in search of the fortune. Anna unknowingly bought the dresses upon her arrival in Hokitika; one of her clients, Quee, discovered the gold in four of her dresses and secretly removed and replaced with leaden makeweights while she slept. However, because Anna never wore the fifth dress while visiting Chinatown, the gold in that dress remained. He then smelted the gold and submitted it to the bank, only to discover it had been stolen by Staines.

After hearing and considering the tales of the other twelve men, Moody tells them his own story: he believes he saw the ghost of Emery Staines on the Godspeed. As he tells them his story, the council is interrupted by one of Dick Mannering's servants telling them the ship has foundered just off-shore.

Three weeks later, the wreckage of Godspeed is pulled up onto shore. Moody is mistakenly sent Alistair Lauderback's trunk, in which he finds letters revealing that Crosbie was Lauderback's half-brother, a bastard born to a prostitute mother. Crosbie had originally travelled to New Zealand in search of their father, and had attempted to contact Lauderback for years to no response. In the letters, he also reveals that he amassed an enormous fortune on the goldfields, only for the fortune to be subsequently stolen from him in circumstances he declines to divulge.

Lydia Wells, Crosbie Wells' widow and Carver's mistress, announces that she plans to hold a séance to contact the ghost of Emery Staines. As an assistant, she hires Wetherell, who has recently given up prostitution, having paid off her debt to Edgar Clinch. Lydia claims to have befriended Wetherell when she first arrived in Dunedin, but keeps her under a tight watch and does not allow her out without supervision. Sook Yongsheng, Wetherell's opium dealer and friend, goes to visit her, and recognises Lydia as Carver's mistress. Sook had sworn revenge on Carver years earlier for murdering his father, and he will not rest until Carver is dead. Lydia insists that Sook attend the séance, where instead of channelling Staines, she speaks Cantonese and repeats Sook's promise to kill Carver many years before. After the séance, Sook goes to Carver's hotel to attempt to murder him. However, before he can execute his revenge, he is shot by George Shepard, the gaoler, in an act of revenge for his brother, whom Shepard believes was killed by Sook.

On the very same night, Emery Staines appears in Crosbie Wells' cabin having been shot in the shoulder. Te Rau Tauwhare brings him back to town to get medical attention, where he is reunited with Anna Wetherell, who has mysteriously suffered a parallel injury. Upon removal of the bullet, Emery Staines is kept at the gaol-house with Anna Wetherell. Cowell Devlin, observing the two facing each other as they sleep, concludes that they are lovers.

At the beginning of Part Four, the novel abandons its linear narrative to recount Anna Wetherell’s first arrival in New Zealand in April of 1865. On the ship to New Zealand, Anna meets Staines for the first time (although he does not reveal his name) as he points to the mythical nature of the albatrosses flying overhead.

Returning to the autumnal equinox, Staines and Wetherell are charged with various crimes, and Moody agrees to act as their lawyer. The trial reveals the truths behind the crimes; amongst other things, that Carver and Lydia plotted together to steal Crosbie Wells' gold, that Carver bought the Godspeed by blackmailing Lauderback, and that Carver killed Wells by drugging him with laudanum. After the trial is over, Staines is sentenced to nine months of hard labour and Wetherell is acquitted. Carver is taken to prison but on the way is found murdered. It is implied that the murder was committed by Te Rau Tauwhare, using a greenstone patu, as vengeance for his old friend Crosbie Wells. Walter Moody finally leaves Hokitika to begin to prospect for gold.

== Astrology ==
While planning the novel, Catton discovered there had been a triple conjunction in Sagittarius at the time the novel was set.

"As I tracked it over the year, I could see that certain planets were following each other and it set me to thinking about how I could put that into a story. Mercury, which is a planet that governs reason, was following just behind all the other players of the action. So I could build this narrative that the person who is trying to unravel the mysteries is one step behind it all."

Catton used star charts from Sky and Telescope and the programme Stellarium to reconstruct the night sky over the novel's time frame. At that point, she had only a rudimentary understanding of astrology, but during the process of writing The Luminaries, she became "slightly obsessed".

"I like to think of the zodiac as having a lot in common with the Greek pantheon: less of a thing to be believed in, and more of a repository of cultural knowledge and history that is archetypal, and mythic, and responsive to close study."

Each of the twelve men who constitute the council in the first chapter of the book is a "stellar" character, associated with one of the twelve signs of the zodiac. The title of a chapter in which one of these men plays a major role invariably bears that man's sign. These titles also reflect the true positions of the planets or stars on the given dates. Each chapter contains a mini heading that offers a gist for what the chapter will entail.

- Te Rau Tauwhare (a greenstone hunter): Aries
- Charlie Frost (a banker): Taurus
- Benjamin Lowenthal (a newspaperman): Gemini
- Edgar Clinch (a hotelier): Cancer
- Dick Mannering (a goldfields magnate): Leo
- Quee Long (a goldsmith): Virgo
- Harald Nilssen (a commission merchant): Libra
- Joseph Pritchard (a chemist): Scorpio
- Thomas Balfour (a shipping agent): Sagittarius
- Aubert Gascoigne (a justice's clerk): Capricorn
- Sook Yongsheng (a hatter, a euphemism for someone who digs alone): Aquarius
- Cowell Devlin (a chaplain): Pisces

Another set of characters are "planetary", associated with heavenly bodies within the Solar System.

- Walter Moody: Mercury
- Lydia (Wells) Carver née Greenway: Venus
- Francis Carver: Mars
- Alistair Lauderback: Jupiter
- George Shepard: Saturn
- Anna Wetherell: The Sun/The Moon
- Emery Staines: The Moon/The Sun

All these characters are grounded by the murdered man, around whom the plot revolves.

- Crosbie Wells: Terra Firma

The conventional characteristics associated with each sign serve as a skeleton upon which Catton builds to create fully fledged characters. Te Rau Tauwhare is the only name on the list based on a real person; all others are fictional.

The novel is divided into twelve sections, each shorter than the one before, to mimic the moon waning through its lunar cycle, and bringing historical relevance to the astrology referenced throughout this novel. Catton has described this as "like a wheel, a huge cartwheel, creaky at the beginning and spinning faster and faster as it goes."

== Origin ==
Aged 14, Catton and her father went on a tandem trip from their home in Christchurch over Arthur's Pass to the West Coast. This inspired her interest in the 1860s West Coast gold rush, and she started thinking about a story. She spent time in Hokitika while writing the book many years later. She was also inspired by her love of adventure mysteries for children and young adults, and after writing her first novel The Rehearsal, which had no specific setting, wanted to write a book that was "firmly located in time and space". The Luminaries makes use of numerous real-life settings in 1866 Hokitika, including the West Coast Times office, Revell and Wharf Streets, and the former courthouse on Sewell Street; after its publication the town offered Luminaries walking tours and Hokitika Museum published a book of historical photos captioned with passages from the novel.

Reading and researching the book took two years. Catton said of her process: "I started reading, beginning with gold-rush history, which led me to the nature of wealth, which led me to confidence tricks and scams, which led me to fortune telling, which led me to the stars." She also read as much nineteenth century fiction and crime fiction as she could. Towards the end of her research, she read The Castle of Crossed Destinies by Italo Calvino, and found the book's structural patterning made it difficult to read; she decided she wanted to write a book that was "structurally ornate and actively plotted at the same time". Most of the book was written in Christchurch while Catton was the Ursula Bethell Writer in Residence at the University of Canterbury. She said later: "I don't know what the book would have looked like without that residency. This idea of unstructured time — there's nothing like it."

Catton returned to Hokitika in March 2014, and gave a question and answer session at the Regent Theatre with her British publisher, Max Porter, in front of a sell-out crowd. She revealed that she had used the Papers Past website of the National Library of New Zealand to find suitable names for her characters. For example, for the character Thomas Balfour, it appears that Catton adopted the surname of the marine engineer James Balfour who did an assessment of the possibility for a port in Hokitika during the gold rush. The ship captain James Raxworthy took his name from Raxworthy Panelbeaters in Christchurch, a business Catton cycled past each day on her way to the University of Canterbury. She deliberately chose Te Rau Tauwhare's surname based on its meaning "House of Years", which reflected the book's astrological themes.

== Reception ==
The book met with critical acclaim and was described as "a dazzling feat of a novel" by The Observer.

Bill Roorbach wrote in The New York Times that The Luminaries was "a lot of fun, like doing a Charlotte Brontë-themed crossword puzzle while playing chess and Dance Dance Revolution on a Bongo Board." Booker judge Stuart Kelly said the book "was more like a Kiwi Twin Peaks than any kind of novel I've read before". Julian Novitz, writing in the Sydney Review of Books, commented that the novel "is not only set in the nineteenth century; it appears to be of the nineteenth century, or as close to it as possible", comparing its scope, length and style to that of a Victorian novel. He concluded that the novel "can be appreciated on many different levels, but ... builds into a consistent and harmonious whole". Jonathan Barnes wrote in Literary Review that Catton's work "revitalises the Victorian novel... while also slyly interrogating its assumptions and techniques." Barnes described the Booker Prize nominee, and later winner, as a "thoroughly 21st-century work," which deserves to outlive the prize season.

By contrast, New Zealand scholar and poet C. K. Stead wrote a critical review for the Financial Times. Although he praised the novel's "exceptional detail and verisimilitude", he suggested that the story was "shamelessly implausible", and concluded "it doesn't allow me to forget, even for a moment, that this is fiction — the novel as game, played brilliantly, but at such length I couldn't entirely overcome that impatience". Michael Morrissey went further in a review that was later described by Ross Brighton as a "snide, derisive shrug" without "much in the way of actual critical content". Catton later said she had seen a difference in how her book was received in New Zealand compared to the United Kingdom: "I think all of the reviews I've had that have been big profile reviews from New Zealanders have been very cold, and the reviews I have had from the UK so far have been very warm. Even when the reviewers are talking about what they don't like about the book, they will say, 'there's still something exciting going on here', whereas I feel like the New Zealand ones have been more concerned with devaluing the book." In an interview with The Guardian, Catton said the book was subject to a "bullying" reception from older male reviewers in New Zealand.

By August 2014, a year after the book's publication, The Luminaries had sold 560,000 print and digital copies, of which 120,000 were sold in New Zealand (most New Zealand fiction sells 1000 to 2000 copies). The Luminaries was the top seller on the New Zealand adult fiction list for the entire year, and translation rights were sold in 26 languages. To be eligible for the Booker Prize the book needed a UK English publisher: it became the best-selling book in Granta's history.

== Awards and honours ==
The Luminaries won the 2013 Booker Prize. It was the longest book (832 pages) and Catton the youngest author (28) ever to win the Booker. Robert Macfarlane, chair of the Booker judges, said of the book, "It’s a dazzling work. It's a luminous work. It is vast without being sprawling." Catton beat more established authors like Colm Tóibín and Ruth Ozeki for the award, and was the second New Zealander to win it after Keri Hulme for The Bone People in 1985, the year of Catton's birth.

The Luminaries was cited in The Wall Street Journal's "Best Fiction of 2013", The Christian Science Monitor's 15 best fiction of 2013 and The Economist magazine's "Books of the Year" (2013). It won the Governor General's Award for English-language fiction in Canada, was shortlisted for the Walter Scott Prize (2014), was longlisted for the Baileys Women's Prize for Fiction (2014), and was longlisted for the International Dublin Literary Award (2015). In the 2014 New Zealand Post Book Awards, it received the top prize for fiction and the People's Choice Award.

Year	Award	Category	Result	Ref.
2013	Booker Prize	—	Won	
2013	British Book Awards	International Author	Shortlisted	
2013	Goodreads Choice Awards	Historical Fiction	Longlisted	
2013	Governor General's Literary Award	Fiction (English)	Won	
2014	Australian Book Industry Awards	International Book	Won	
2014	Dylan Thomas Prize	—	Shortlisted	
2014	Maine Readers' Choice Award	—	Longlisted	
2014	New Zealand Post Book Award	Fiction and People's Choice	Won	
2014	Walter Scott Prize	—	Shortlisted	
2015	International Dublin Literary Award	—	Longlisted	
2015	Yasnaya Polyana Literary Award	Foreign Literature	Won	

== Adaptation ==
The Luminaries was adapted into a six-part television miniseries by Working Title Television and Southern Light Films for BBC Two in association with TVNZ, Fremantle, and Silver Reel. The series was produced by Lisa Chatfield and directed by Claire McCarthy. Production was funded by the New Zealand Film Commission. It premiered on TVNZ 1 on 17 May 2020 and was also available on TVNZ's streaming service TVNZ On Demand. The series was first broadcast on BBC One in the United Kingdom on 21 June 2020, and on Starz in the United States on 14 February 2021.

Catton was the screenwriter for the series, and shifted the focus to make Anna Wetherell, a secondary character in the book, the protagonist of the series. Catton served as showrunner with director McCarthy during filming.

== See also ==
- Opium Wars
- Otago Gold Rush
- Māori people
