= A. Laurie Palmer =

American artist

A. Laurie Palmer is a contemporary American artist, writer, and activist. Her work is in institutional collections including The Smart Museum of Art, Chicago and the City of Linz, Austria. She is a professor at the University of California, Santa Cruz.

== Career ==
Palmer has been exhibiting work both as an individual and as part of the artistic collective Haha since 1988 in national and international venues. Palmer's practice is primarily research-based, and explores the poetics of matter and nature through such subjects as mineral extraction sites, human bodies, and land wealth. Her work takes various forms, including public sculpture, writing, installation, and online websites.

In 2001, Palmer was given an Artadia Award.

In naming Palmer's installation Still, yet, else, further, again one of the best exhibits of 2012 in the Chicago Tribune, Claudine Ise wrote that Palmer's work "imbues the ordinary world with mystery and made us feel as if we were seeing it for the first time."

Her recent work engages with issues of shared natural resources and takes the form of large-scale public projects with a social or environmental focus. Her extended exploration of mineral extracting in the United States resulted in the publication In the Aura of a Hole by Black Dog Publishing (2014), which includes photographs and text by the artist. Each chapter centers on a visit or an attempted visit to an extraction site. The narration discusses themes of environmental justice, Indigenous rights, industrial agriculture, and environmental destruction.

She earned a degree English literature and studio art at Williams College as an undergraduate, a MFA at the School of the Art Institute of Chicago in 1988 in printmaking and sculpture.

== Collaborative work ==
For twenty years, Palmer worked with the artistic collective Haha. The group, composed of Palmer, Richard House, Wendy Jacob, and John Ploof, created work at the intersection of art and activism. For example, their 1993 "Flood: A Volunteer Network for Active Participation in Healthcare," consisted of a hydroponic garden in a storefront in the Rogers Park, Chicago, neighborhood to be used by HIV/AIDS service organizations. The group was founded, in part, as a reaction to trends in art-making that emphasized the global rather than the specificity of place. As the group wrote in a collective statement: "Haha came together to look for ways in which place does matter, in which the particularities of living in a locally and sensually embedded situation....deeply affect our lives."

Haha's final project was the 2008 book Love from Haha, however, Palmer still regards collaboration as "a central ethic" to her practice. In 2006, she collaborated with mathematicians Martin and Erik Demaine on "The Helium Stockpile," a mathematical folding sculpture consisting of hundreds of wooden blocks that can be manipulated into near countless shapes by the viewer.

== Books ==
- Palmer, Laurie A. In the Aura of a Hole: Exploring Sites of Material Extraction. Black Dog Publishing, 2014. ISBN 978-1-908966-58-2
- Jacon, Wendy. Laurie Palmer, and John Ploof, eds. With Love from Haha: Essays and Notes on a Collective Practice. WhiteWalls Press, 2008. ISBN 978-0-945323-13-6
- Palmer, Laurie A. The Lichen Museum: Art After Nature. University of Minnesota Press, 2023. ISBN 978-1-5179-0866-9
