= Westland District Library =

Library in Hokitika, New Zealand

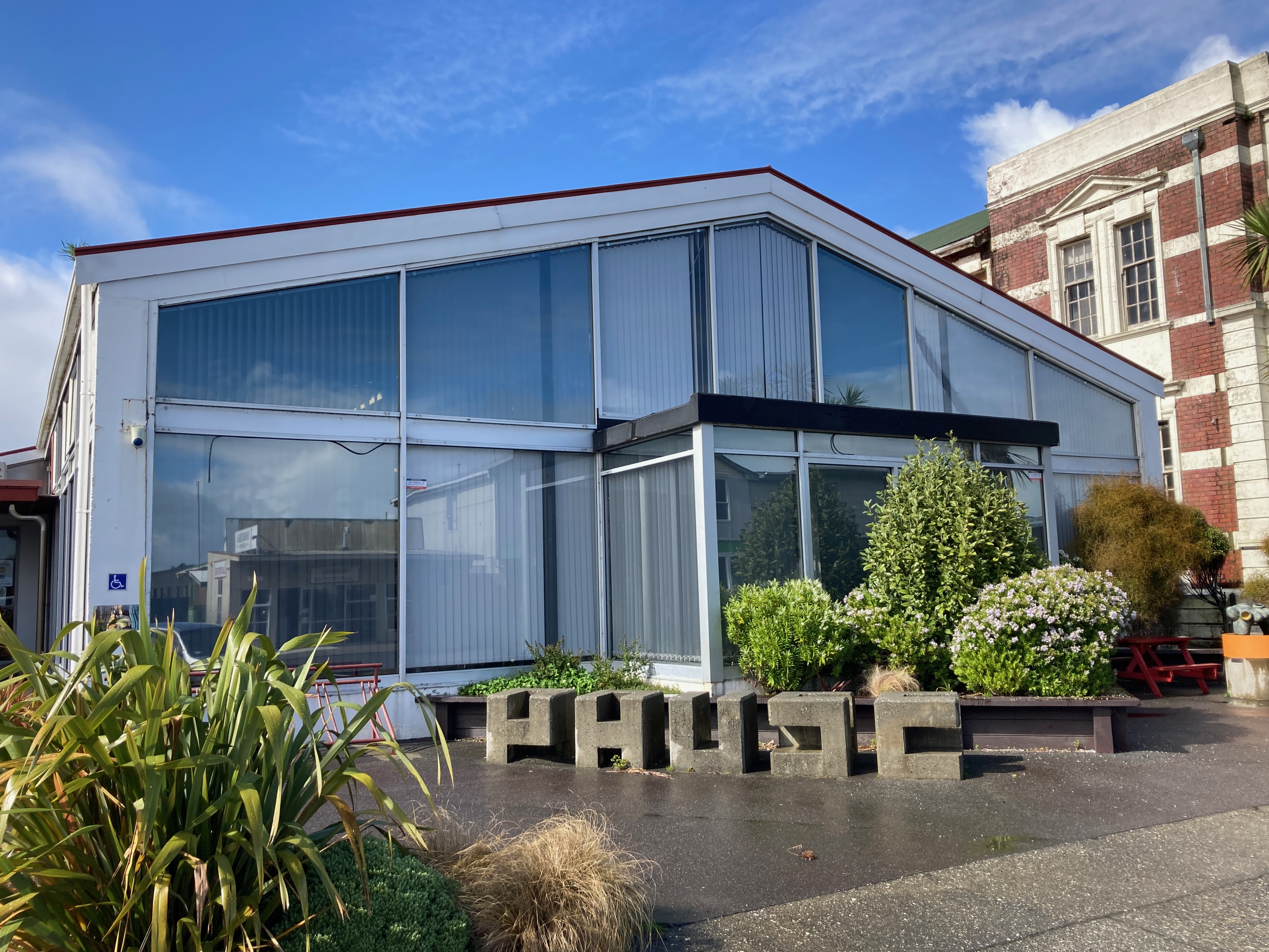
- 42.7189°S 170.9634°E
- Location: Hokitika, New Zealand
- Type: Public library
- Established: 1866

Collection

Other information
- Director: Natasha Morris
- Parent organization: Westland District Council
- Website: westlib.co.nz

The Westland District Library is the public library in Hokitika, on the West Coast of New Zealand. Beginning as the Hokitika Literary Society in 1866, it occupied a Carnegie library building from 1908 as the Hokitika Free Public Library, moving out in 1975.

== Origins ==
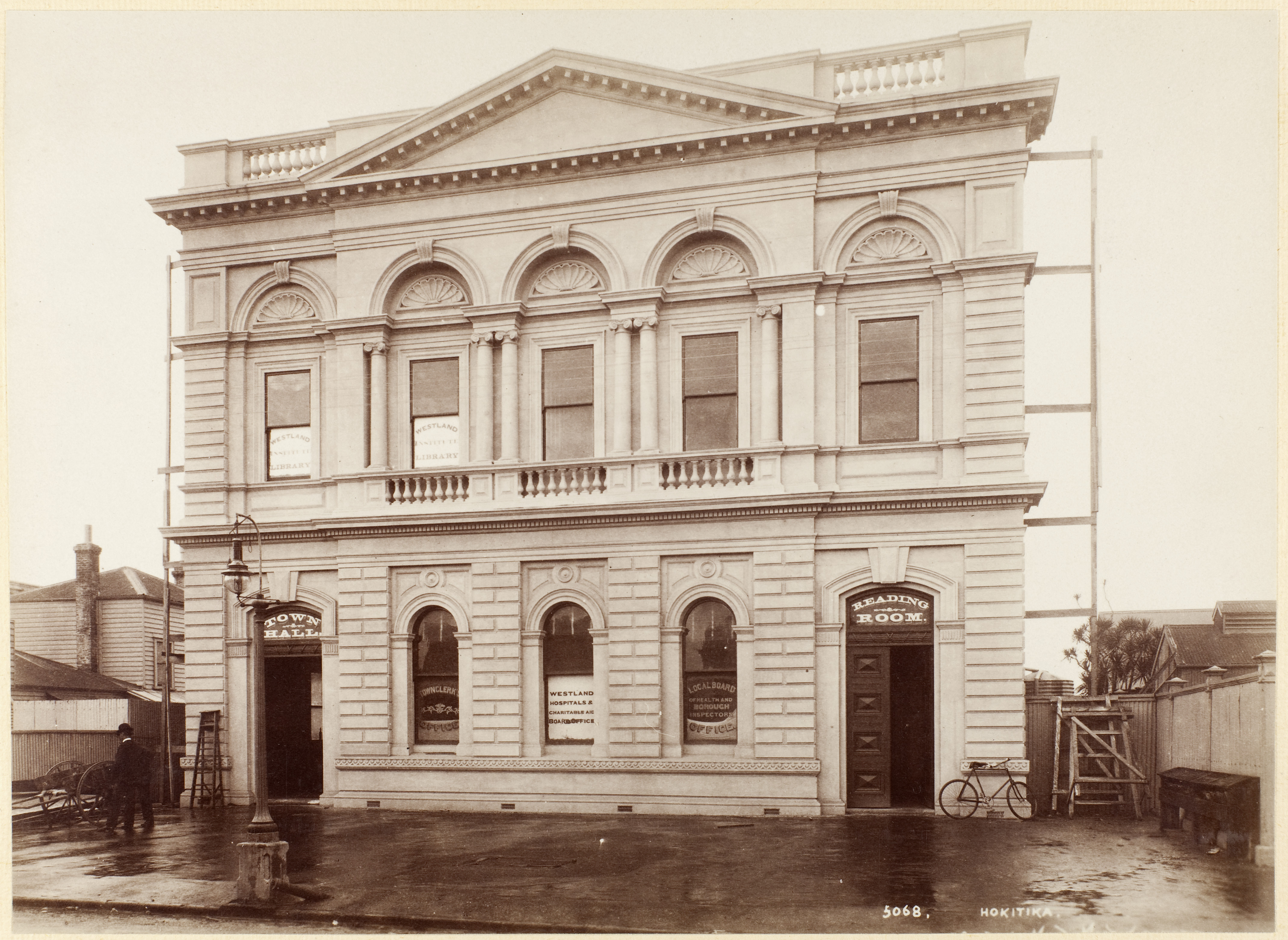
Hokitika Town Hall, c. 1900; the right-hand door leads to the Reading Room

The population of Hokitika increased rapidly during the West Coast gold rush of the 1860s. In 1866 the town formed a literary society, with membership costing 5 shillings a quarter. By 1867 the society had acquired 600 books but nowhere to house them, and began raising funds for a library.

The Hokitika Town Hall and Literary Society was a two-storey wooden building designed by town surveyor and architect William Barnett Armson in one week and built on Revell Street over five months in 1869. Two rooms were set aside as a reading room and library, with their own entrance; two more were devoted to museum exhibits, the nucleus of the Hokitika Museum. The reading room was open from 9:00 am to 10:00 pm six days, and Sunday 2:00 to 6:00 pm. The library was run by the Westland Institute, a branch of the New Zealand Institute established in 1868; by 1886 it had 2000 catalogued volumes and the librarian and secretary was R. Hilldrup. By 1899 there were 60 subscribers and 35,000 volumes.

== Hokitika Free Public Library ==
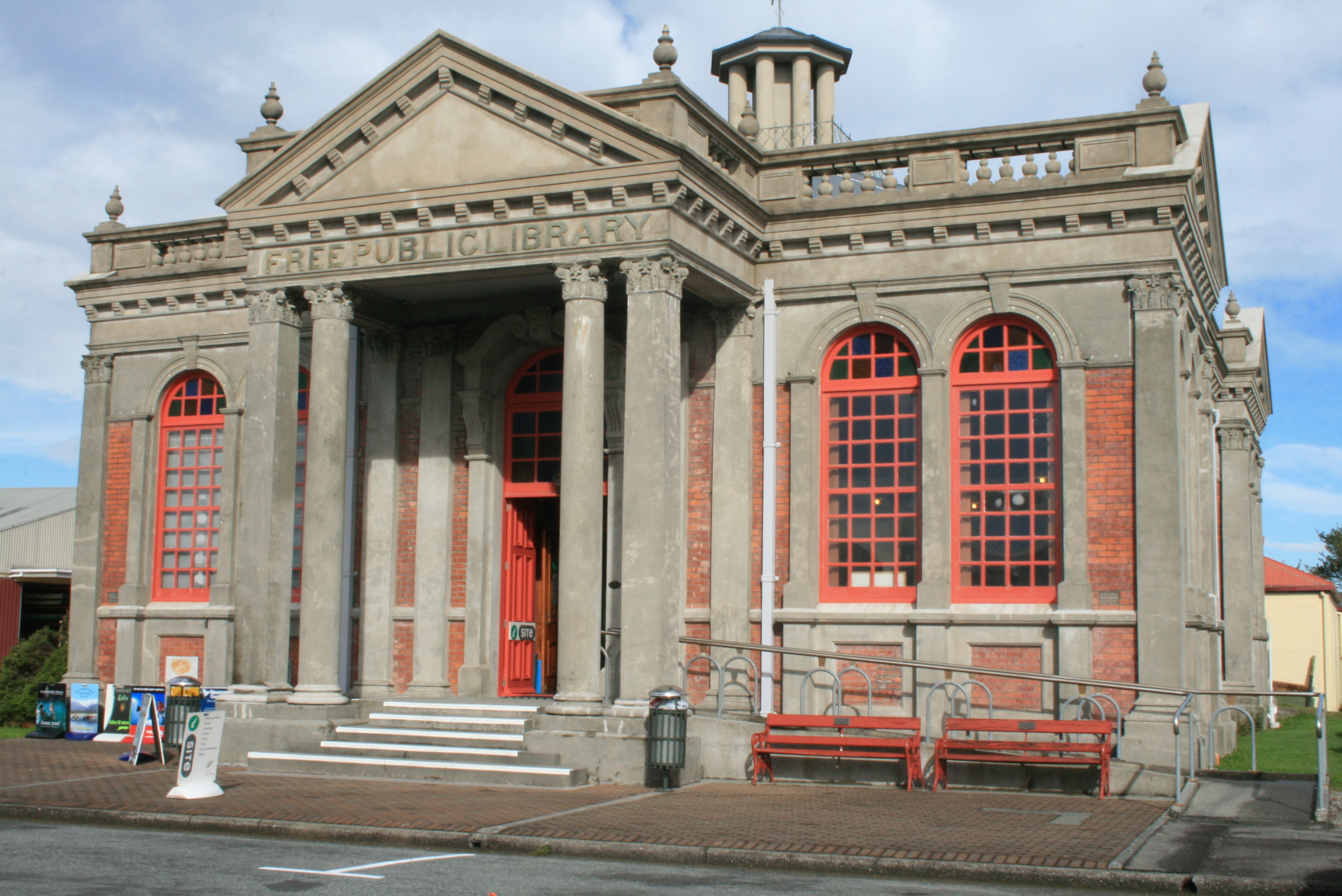
The Carnegie library building that housed Hokitika's public library 1908–1975

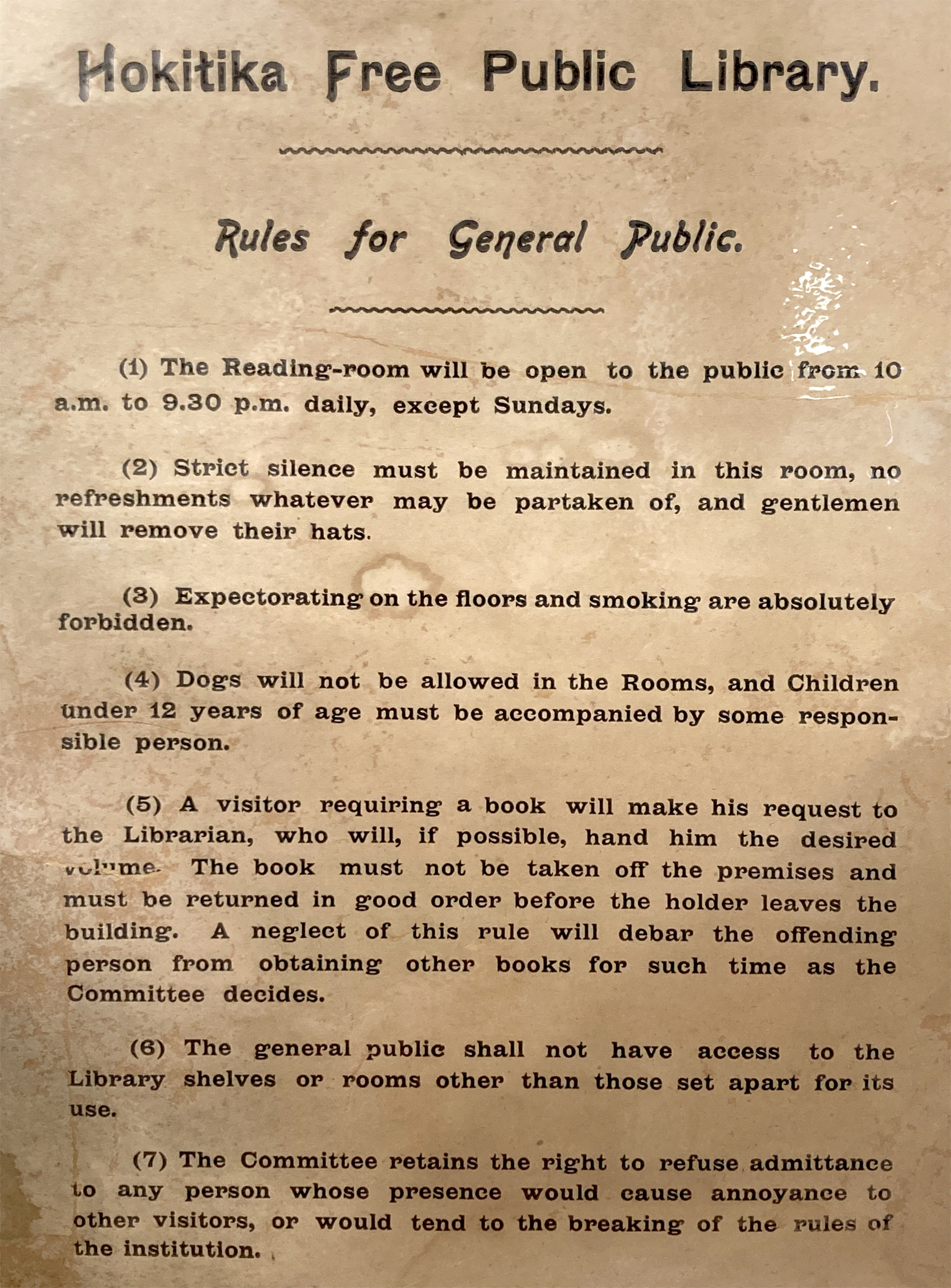
The rules for the Hokitika Free Public Library required gentleman to remove their hats and not spit on the floor

The 1869 Public Library Act placed the management of any public library in the hands of the local council and required admission to be free, but limited rates to support library buildings to one penny in the pound. Thus, it was difficult to fund new library buildings. In 1903 the mayor of Hokitika Henry Michel wrote to philanthropist Andrew Carnegie and requested £4000 to build a public library for the town. Carnegie was an industrialist with a belief in the power of libraries for self-betterment, and funded the construction of over 2500 libraries around the English-speaking world. In 1906 he agreed to supply £2000 for a library for Hokitika, and later added £500 for furnishings – an unusual step, as he usually funded just the capital cost of the building. The local Mechanics Institute and the Hokitika Borough Council also contributed financially, and the Hokitika Savings Bank donated £400. Nelson architect Arthur Griffin's design was chosen from six submitted proposals, and William Arnott & Co. won the construction tender for £2,034. The foundation stone was laid in November 1906, and the Free Public Library opened on 24 June 1908 on the corner of Tancred Street and Hamilton Street – it was dubbed "the finest building architecturally on the West Coast". It had a public reading room, newspaper room, reference room, and a library with adjoining committee room, all high-ceilinged and well-lit by large circular windows.

The library incorporated the collections of the Literary Society and the Mechanics institute. In September 1906 the Westland Institute had handed over all books and fittings, and funds of £280. A further £108 worth of new library books was donated.

Carnegie often stipulated that the libraries he funded would be free to use, which was sometimes at odds with local councils' desire to generate revenue. The Hokitika library was no exception: any resident could read books and newspapers in the reading room for no charge, but although "FREE PUBLIC LIBRARY" was written in capitals above the portico, borrowing books in fact required a paid subscription – violating the letter and spirit of the Carnegie grant.

== Westland District Library ==
The Carnegie building had a leaking slate roof – unable to cope with the West Coast's rainfall, it was replaced with corrugated iron – and porous walls. In April 1975 the library moved out into premises on Sewell Street. After much debate, the Westland District Council resolved in September 2020 to move both the library and the Hokitika Museum exhibits into a single building at 41 Weld Street, to be called the Westland Discovery Centre / Pakiwaitara.
