= The Luminaries (miniseries) =

New Zealand television series

- Genre: Drama
- Based on: The Luminaries by Eleanor Catton
- Written by: Eleanor Catton
- Directed by: Claire McCarthy
- Starring: Eve Hewson; Eva Green; Himesh Patel; Ewen Leslie; Marton Csokas; Benedict Hardie; Erik Thomson; Richard Te Are
- Composer: David Long
- Countries of origin: New Zealand; United Kingdom
- Original language: English
- No. of series: 1
- No. of episodes: 6

Production
- Executive producers: Claudia Bluemhuber; Georgina Gordon-Smith; Claire McCarthy; Mona Qureshi; Christian Vesper; Timothy White
- Producers: Lisa Chatfield; Luke Robinson; Judith Tyre
- Production location: New Zealand
- Running time: 60 minutes
- Production companies: Working Title Television; Southern Light Films; TVNZ; Fremantle; Silver Reel

Original release
- Network: TVNZ 1 (NZ); BBC One (UK)
- Release: 17 May 2020

The Luminaries is a 2020 drama television miniseries written by Eleanor Catton (based on her 2013 novel The Luminaries) and directed by Claire McCarthy. The series is centred on a young adventurer named Anna Wetherell (Eve Hewson), who has travelled from the United Kingdom to start a new life in New Zealand during the 1860s West Coast gold rush.

In New Zealand The Luminaries premiered on TVNZ 1 on 17 May 2020 and then had its first broadcast in the UK on BBC One on 21 June 2020. The series has received mixed reviews from critics, though it went on to earn 14 nominations at the 2020 New Zealand Television Awards, winning 8 of them.

== Background ==
Eleanor Catton's novel was awarded the 2013 Man Booker Prize. TVNZ summarises the story as an "epic drama (that) tells the 19th-century tale of love, murder and revenge as men and women travel across the world to make their fortunes on the wild West Coast of New Zealand's South Island." The BBC synopsis added that the series is set "in the boom years of the 1860s gold rush". The script was written by Catton herself and was said to be "very different from the book".

Trailers for the series, providing additional specifics, were released by the BBC on 12 June 2020.

== Cast and characters ==
=== Main ===
- Eve Hewson as Anna Wetherell
- Eva Green as Lydia Wells
- Himesh Patel as Emery Staines
- Ewen Leslie as Crosbie Wells
- Marton Csokas as Francis Carver
- Benedict Hardie as Alistair Lauderback
- Erik Thomson as Dick Mannering
- Richard Te Are as Te Rau Tauwhare

=== Recurring ===
- Callan Mulvey as George Shepard
- Michael Sheasby as Walter Moody
- Joel Tobeck as Ben Lowenthal
- Paolo Rotondo as Aubert Gascoigne
- Matt Whelan as Cowell Devlin
- Matthew Sunderland as Joseph Pritchard
- Byron Coll as Charlie Frost
- Mark Mitchinson as Thomas Balfour
- Yoson An as Sook Yongsheng
- Erroll Shand as Harald Nilssen
- Kirean Charnock as Edgar Clinch
- Gary Young as Quee Long
- Charlie Corrigan as Graves
- Nic Sampson as Sinclair

== Episodes and synopsis ==
No.	Title	Directed by	Written by	Original release date	UK Airdate
1	"Fingerprint"	Claire McCarthy	Eleanor Catton	17 May 2020	21 June 2020
In 1865, Anna Wetherell befriends a fellow traveller named Emery Staines during the last day of their voyage to Dunedin. The two are travelling to exploit the Gold Rush. Anna finds lodging with an American fortune teller named Lydia Wells, while Emery agrees to a prospecting deal with Francis Carver. Sook Yongsheng attacks Francis Carver in a Dunedin bar. Lydia's husband Crosbie Wells returns, having profited from mining for gold in Hokitika, a gold-rush town on New Zealand's West Coast. Months later, the greenstone hunter Te Rau Tauwhare discovers the body of a local hermit named Crosbie Wells. Anna, found unconscious nearby, is arrested and accused of Crosbie's murder, but pays bail with gold sewn into her dress.
2	"The Place You Return"	Claire McCarthy	Eleanor Catton	17 May 2020	22 June 2020
In Dunedin, Anna continues boarding with Lydia and her husband Crosbie Wells, helping them with daily chores at their hotel. Anna also tends to the wounded Sook Yongsheng. Francis later tells Emery about his connection to Sook's father, who had helped British merchants smuggle opium into China during the Opium Wars. While Lydia flirts with Francis Carver, Crosbie takes a liking to Anna, even teaching her how to use a pistol. At sea, Emery Staine's boat capsizes. He is rescued and later arrives at Hokitika on the West Coast. Later, Anna also seeks information from Rau Tauwhare about the whereabouts of Emery. He claims that Emery is dead.
3	"Leverage"	Claire McCarthy	Eleanor Catton	17 May 2020	28 June 2020
Lydia and Francis Carver plot against her husband Crosbie Wells. Later, Lydia hosts a party that is attended by several dignitaries including the politician Alistair Lauderback. While impersonating Wells, Francis blackmails Alistair into trading his ship Godspeed over to him. Carver later attacks Crosbie but the latter fights back, scarring him in the face. Blaming Anna for the failed attack, Lydia banishes her from her hotel. Destitute, Anna finds work as a prostitute in Hokitika under the management of Dick Mannering. She also encounters Sook, who is mining for gold. Anna later becomes pregnant with a child. Crosbie stows aboard the Godspeed, intending to recover his gold but is mistaken for an intruder. He is thrown overboard and washes up on Māori land where he encounters Emery Staines and Rau Tauwhare. The ship captain later meets Francis, who convinces him that he is the real "Crosbie Wells". In 1866, Lydia travels to Hokitika but is too late for her husband's funeral.
4	"The Other Half"	Claire McCarthy	Eleanor Catton	17 May 2020	5 July 2020
Anna reunites with Emery while working as a dancer in a concert hall. While Anna is visiting an opium den in Hokitika, Mr. Quee steals the gold embedded in her dress, hoping to bank it. Francis Carver later confronts Anna, demanding the gold. Emery intervenes, causing a fight in which Anna is thrown out of the window. Anna miscarries and grieves for her unborn child. Angered by Francis' actions, Emery digs for gold in the tailing piles, hoping to sabotage Carver. Following a failed attempt to sell Anna's gold, Mr. Quee has it forged into gold bars, claiming they came from the Aurora dig. In 1866, Lydia travels to Hokitika, seeking the gold from Anna. Unable to find the gold, Lydia decides to frame Anna for the murder by planting Anna's laudanum vial near the crime scene. Anna later tries to shoot herself when confronted by her drug dealer about the laudanum vial.
5	"Paradox"	Claire McCarthy	Eleanor Catton	17 May 2020	12 July 2020
Anna shoots herself but inexplicably survives. Meanwhile, Emery receives a bullet wound while traveling aboard the Godspeed, which is returning to Hokitika. Following the incident, Anna goes back to working as a prostitute for Dick Mannering. In a flashback, Francis incapacitates Crosbie with a vial of laudanum. He then stages the murder scene, leaving Anna and Lauderback with Crosbie's body. 13 men including Sook, Mr Quee and the lawyer Walter Moody gather to investigate Crosbie's death. Emery and Anna later reconcile and a cosmic transference occurs during their first kiss. Following the sinking of the Godspeed, Lauderback confronts Francis, denouncing as a fraud. Sook attempts to settle scores with Francis but is instead killed by Francis' former jailer George Shepard. Due to their cosmic connection, Anna becomes unconscious after Emery consumes opium. Anna is later arrested on the charges of having murdered Crosbie and Emery, the latter of whom has disappeared.
6	"The Old Moon in the Young Moon's Arms"	Claire McCarthy	Eleanor Catton	17 May 2020	19 July 2020
Anna is tried for the murders of Crosbie and Emery. Emery later resurfaces and reunited with Anna, also giving testimony at court. Walter Moody agrees to represent Anna in court. During the trial, Anna presents a journal by Crosbie which confirms that Crosbie and undermines Lydia's claim that Anna had seduced and murdered her late husband. In addition, the trial uncovers Frank and Lydia's plot to steal Crosbie's gold, that Frank purchased the Godspeed by blackmailing Lauderback, and that Frank murdered Crosbie. Based on this evidence, Anna is acquitted while Frank is arrested. Frank is killed by a vengeful Te Rau Tauwhare on the way to prison. Emery is sentenced to a reduced sentence while Mr Quee receives compensation for the gold he collected. Later, Anna confronts a dejected Lydia over the theft of her purse. She plans to start a new life after Emery's release.

== Production ==
British producer Andrew Woodhead optioned the novel for television in 2013, before the book had been shortlisted for the Booker Prize. He saw the potential for a television series in the "rich and vivid world" portrayed in the novel and in its core mystery: "What drives a human being to risk their life on a six-month sea voyage to the other side of the world in the hope of making their fortune on a gold field?" Catton was brought on as the screenwriter for the series, an "unusual if not entirely unheard-of" arrangement. She wrote hundreds of drafts of the pilot episode, but in late 2015 the BBC declined the series; she then shifted the focus to make the protagonist Anna Wetherell, a minor character in the book, and rewrote the series, which was commissioned by the BBC in mid-2016.

In 2019, it was reported that BBC Two was producing a miniseries adaptation, to be directed by McCarthy. The miniseries was produced by Working Title Television and Southern Light Films for BBC Two in association with TVNZ, Fremantle, and Silver Reel, with funding from the New Zealand Film Commission. Catton served as showrunner with director McCarthy during filming.

According to Condé Nast Traveler, the series was filmed at many locations in New Zealand, including the South Island's southeast coast, Hokitika on the West Coast and near Auckland. The Wild West-style main street of Dunedin was set in the car park of a film studio. Other locations included the Tawharanui Peninsula, Te Henga (Bethells Beach) (at and near the water) and a farm where the village of Hokitika and Chinatown were recreated. Because the Arahura River was experiencing flooding, the production shot at Crooked River. The scene of Anna and Emery’s arrival by boat in New Zealand was filmed at Whangaroa; a small set was built on a barge. Catton had insisted on the series being produced on the West Coast, as the flora and fauna there are unique.

The production design crew, led by New Zealand-born Felicity Abbott, had to build more than 105 unique sets from scratch, to recreate the West Coast of the South Island during the gold rush of the 1860s. This took a year to complete.

== Release ==
The Luminaries premiered on TVNZ 1 on 17 May 2020 and was also available on TVNZ's streaming service TVNZ On Demand. In the United Kingdom, the series was originally intended for distribution by BBC Two but premiered on BBC One on 21 June 2020.

Starz network aired The Luminaries in the United States beginning on 14 February 2021.

== Reception ==
Early reviews in the UK were quite positive. "It is glorious escapism, perfect for our times ... promises to be as addictive as it was in its original form", according to The Guardian. The Times review was neutral but praised the fine performance by Eve Hewson. The review in The Telegraph was less favourable: "It sounds odd to say that a period drama feels dated ... seemed a stuffy throwback" and complained of the overly dark lighting effects. According to BBC News, "many viewers on social media also pointed out the dim lighting, with some saying they had to turn up their brightness while watching".

On review aggregator Rotten Tomatoes, the series holds an approval rating of 65% based on 31 critical reviews, with an average weighting of 6.3/10. The site's critical consensus states: "Lucious [sic], but lacking, The Luminaries has style and character to spare, but those looking for a little more depth may be left wanting."

== Accolades ==
At the 2020 New Zealand Television Awards, The Luminaries was the most nominated series, with 14 award nominations. It received multiple wins including Best Script (Drama) for Catton, Best Director (Drama) for McCarthy, Best Actor for Himesh Patel, as well as Best Cinematography, Best Production Design (Felicity Abbott), Best Costume Design, Best Makeup Design and Best Post Production Design.
