= Arthur Griffin (architect) =

New Zealand architect (1883–1967)

- Born: Arthur Reynolds Griffin; 26 September 1883; Nelson, New Zealand
- Died: 16 July 1967 (aged 83)
- Occupation: Architect
- Spouse: Barbara Ellen Warnock (m. 1908; died 1965)
- Buildings: Hokitika Carnegie Library; Renton Hardware building

Arthur Reynolds Griffin (26 September 1883 – 16 July 1967) was a New Zealand architect based in Nelson during the first half of the 20th century. His notable works include the Hokitika Carnegie Library, the church steps in Nelson (also known as the Cawthron steps) (1913), and the Ritz Louis Kerr building (1930) in Nelson.

== Biography ==
Griffin was born in Nelson on 26 September 1883, the son of John Hollis Griffin and Martha Louisa Griffin (née Biss). His grandfather, John Griffin, was the founder of biscuit manufacturer Griffin and Sons Limited. He was educated at Nelson College for one year, in 1898, winning the fourth-form drawing prize.

Griffin began his architectural career as a draughtsman with Robertson Brothers in Nelson for four years, and during the same period studied architecture through the International Correspondence School in Pennsylvania. He set up his own practice in Hardy Street, Nelson, in January 1906, after winning a competition for the design of the Hokitika Carnegie Library. In 1907, he won a second architectural competition, for the new central girls' school in Shelbourne Street, Nelson. Between 1908 and 1909, Griffin served as the Nelson Education Board's architect, but was dismissed after the board determined that he had claimed for fees additional to those to which he was entitled. However, during that short period he completed a number of new schools and extensions for the Education Board.

In 1908, Griffin married Barbara Ellen Warnock, and by 1909 they were living at 18 Ngatitama Street, Nelson. Griffin remained in practice until about 1960, but was semi-retired from the 1940s. He produced a diverse range of work, including many commercial buildings in central Nelson, churches, private residences, and significant buildings for Nelson Hospital. He died on 16 July 1967, and was buried at Marsden Valley Cemetery, Stoke. He had been predeceased by his wife in 1965.

== Notable works ==
Notable buildings and structures designed by Griffin include:

Building	Image	Date	Location	Notes
Hokitika Carnegie Library		1907	17 Hamilton Street, Hokitika	Granted Heritage New Zealand historic place category 2 status in 2003
Renton Hardware building		1908	21 Hamilton Street, Hokitika	Granted Heritage New Zealand historic place category 2 status in 1989
Central girls' school		1908	27 Shelbourne Street, Nelson	Construction cost £2500; demolished after 1996
Trafalgar Hotel		1908	175 Trafalgar Street, Nelson	Demolished 1966
Westport Technical School		1909	Corner of Henley and Russell Streets, Westport	Construction cost £1326; since demolished
Nelson Evening Mail building		1910	15 Bridge Street, Nelson	Construction cost £2300
Nelson Institute building		1912	309 Hardy Street, Nelson	Granted Heritage New Zealand historic place category 2 status in 1982
Trask memorial gates		1912	Queens Gardens, Hardy Street, Nelson	Part of Queens Gardens, granted Heritage New Zealand historic place category 2 status as a whole in 2007
Nurses' home (Dalton House)		1916	Franklyn Street, Nelson	Granted Heritage New Zealand historic place category 2 status in 1982; demolished 2013
Nelson church steps		1913	Pikimai / Church Hill, Nelson	Granted Heritage New Zealand historic place category 1 status in 1982
Church of Blessed Peter Chanel		1917	31 High Street, Motueka	Granted Heritage New Zealand historic place category 2 status in 1982
Church of the Sacred Heart		1918	94 Commercial Street, Tākaka	Built from Tākaka marble; construction cost £1250
Trathen's building		1922	191 Trafalgar Street, Nelson	Granted Heritage New Zealand historic place category 2 status in 1982; demolished 2016
Nelson Hospital		1926	Waimea Road, Nelson	Construction cost £65,000; since demolished
Anchor Shipping and Foundry building		1927	258 Haven Road, Nelson	Granted Heritage New Zealand historic place category 2 status in 1982
Dalgety and Company building		1929	284 Trafalgar Street, Nelson	Granted Heritage New Zealand historic place category 2 status in 1982
Ritz Louis Kerr building		1930	243–245 Trafalgar Street, Nelson	Granted Heritage New Zealand historic place category 2 status in 1982
Plunket and rest rooms		1936	324 Trafalgar Square, Nelson	Granted Heritage New Zealand historic place category 2 status in 1990
