= The Rehearsal (novel) =

2008 debut novel by Eleanor Catton

- Author: Eleanor Catton
- Language: English
- Genre: Novel, Theatre-fiction
- Published: 2008 Victoria University Press; 2009 Granta
- Publication place: New Zealand
- Media type: Print (Hardback)
- Pages: 317 pp (HB Granta edition)
- ISBN: 978-1-84708-116-2 (HB Granta edition)
- OCLC: 319211192

The Rehearsal is the 2008 debut novel by Eleanor Catton. It was first published by Victoria University Press in New Zealand. The Rehearsal was later bought by Granta Books in the UK and released there in July 2009. In 2016, the film adaptation was screened in the Contemporary World Cinema section at the Toronto International Film Festival.

== Plot summary ==
The novel is split into two loosely interconnecting stories.

In the first story a saxophone teacher becomes aware that Victoria, the older sister of Isolde, one of her pupils, has had a sexual affair with the music teacher, Mr. Saladin. While the adults believe that Victoria was raped, Victoria's fellow students believe that the relationship was consensual. They are forced to attend counselling provided by the school. Isolde, who is two years younger than the rest of the students, is forced to attend with the older girls. While there she develops an interest in Julia, who is rumoured to be a lesbian, because she deliberately provokes the counsellor.

The saxophone teacher invites Julia and Isolde to a concert and the two slowly become friends. The saxophone teacher believes that they might be having a sexual affair and reminisces about her own obsessive love with her friend Patsy, who owns the studio she teaches out of and eventually married a man.

Meanwhile Stanley, a high school graduate, successfully auditions for the Institute, a prestigious drama school. While there he finds himself driven to the middle of the pack and is not thought of as being particularly talented. He begins to crave the attention and adulation of his teachers.

The first year students are expected to put on a show of their own creation without the involvement of the instructors. The students eventually settle on a show about the scandal between Victoria and Mr. Saladin. While rehearsing Stanley runs into Isolde, coming from her private saxophone lessons. The two begin dating.

A month into their relationship Stanley is called into the office of the Head of Movement who is told that the saxophone teacher contacted the Institute to complain about Stanley's relationship with Isolde, who is only fifteen. The Head of Movement also reveals that Isolde is Victoria's sister which Stanley had not previously realized. Terrified he meets with Isolde and has a fight with her, accusing her of implying that he raped her to her saxophone teacher.

To make it up to him Isolde takes her parents to Stanley's show, failing to realize what the play is about. After the show, her family, Stanley and his father, get together to discuss what has happened.

In the aftermath of the affair Victoria returns to school and everything gradually goes back to normal. She asks Julia if she has slept with her sister and asks her to give her enough facts so that she can at least imagine what happened between them.

== Themes ==
The Rehearsal could be understood as theatre-fiction, which, as Graham Wolfe explains, refers to "novels and stories that engage in concrete and sustained ways with theatre as artistic practice and industry". The novel describes theatrical technique in great detail and uses what Catton calls "themes of performance and performativity".

== Critical reaction ==
The initial reaction in New Zealand was positive, but with reservations. Louise O'Brien in the Listener wrote of, "a new talent who has arrived fully formed, with an accomplished, confident and mature voice. This is a startling novel, striking and strange and brave." However, O'Brien thought that characterisation impaired the reader’s emotional involvement.

The Rehearsal received positive overseas reviews. Ed Caesar in The Times speaks of The Rehearsal as imperfect, but praises “a starburst of talent”. Author Joshua Ferris called it "a glimpse into the future of the novel itself". Justine Jordan writing for The Guardian called it an "astonishing debut novel", and "a cause for surprise and celebration: smart, playful and self-possessed, it has the glitter and mystery of the true literary original".

The novel also won a range of awards including the 2007 Adam Award in Creative Writing, the Amazon.ca First Novel Award, the 2009 Betty Trask Award, and 2009 New Zealand Society of Authors Hubert Church (Montana) Best First Book Award for Fiction.

The Irish novelist Paul Murray has expressed his admiration for the novel, writing, "[T]he book of the year [2010] for me was without doubt The Rehearsal, by the preternaturally gifted New Zealand author Eleanor Catton...Perverse, erotic, complex, funny, experimental, and written with the confidence and courage of a true artist."

== Film version ==
The Rehearsal was adapted into a film, directed by Alison Maclean. The film was screened in the Contemporary World Cinema section at the 2016 Toronto International Film Festival.

== Bibliography ==
Wolfe, Graham. “Eleanor Catton’s The Rehearsal: Theatrical Fantasy and the Gaze.” Mosaic: A Journal for the Interdisciplinary Study of Literature 49.3 (2016): 91–108.
