= Hokitika Museum =

Museum in New Zealand

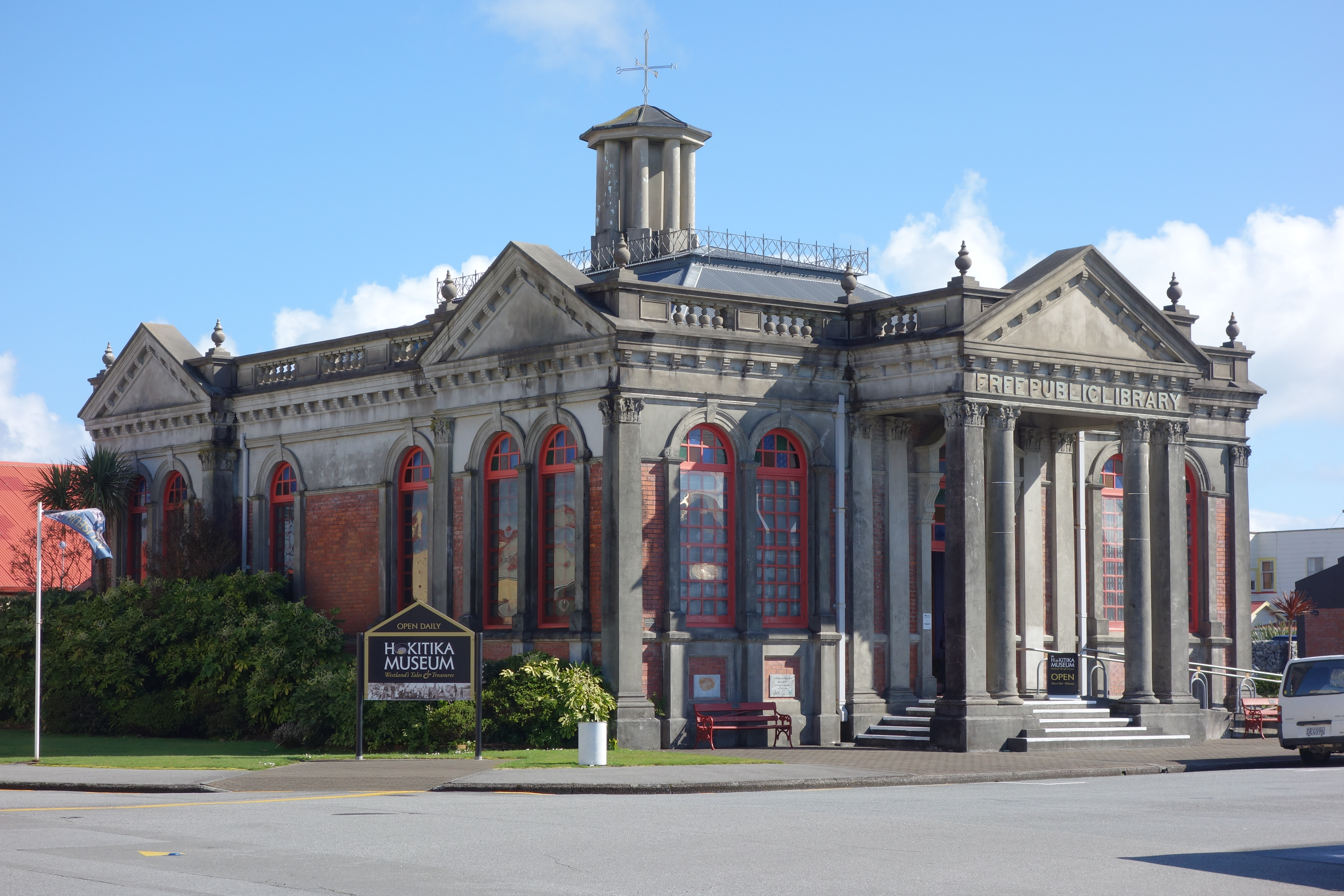
- Hokitika Museum in the Carnegie Building
- Former name: West Coast Historical Museum
- Established: 1869
- Location: 17 Hamilton Street, Hokitika, New Zealand
- Coordinates: 42°43′08″S 170°57′40″E
- Architect: Arthur Griffin
- Website: www.hokitikamuseum.nz

Heritage New Zealand – Category 2
- Designated: 11 December 2003
- Reference no.: 1702

Hokitika Museum is a museum in Hokitika on the West Coast of the South Island in New Zealand, and is the West Coast's largest museum and archive. It is housed in the historic Hokitika Carnegie Library building. Exhibitions include information about the gold rush and the unique West Coast stone pounamu (greenstone) and its value to Māori. The museum also holds a significant photographic collection. Seismic strengthening requirements closed the museum in September 2019. With seismic strengthening complete the Hokitika Museum reopened on the 28th June 2025.

== Origins ==
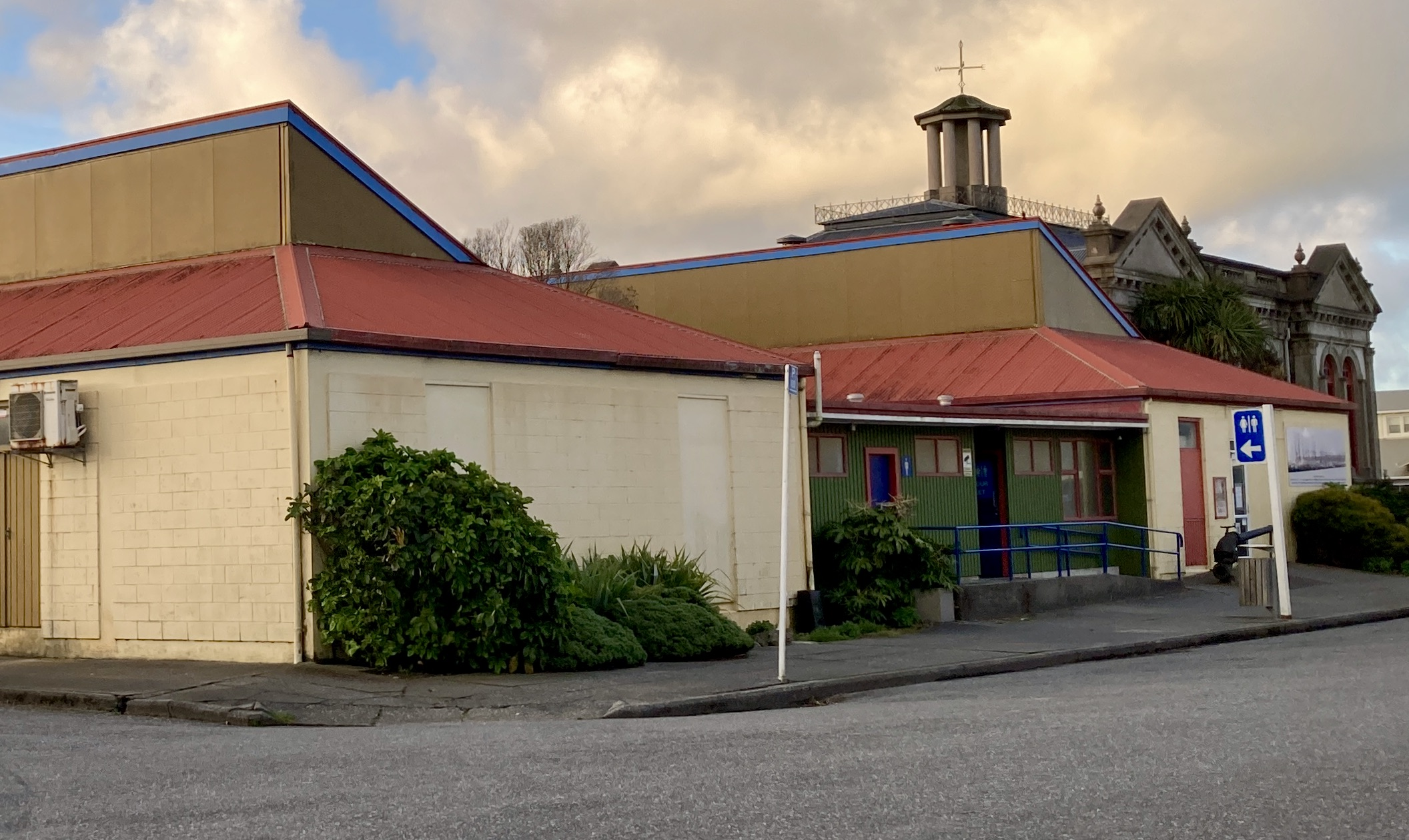
1973 museum building

Hokitika's population had rapidly increased in the 1860s due to the West Coast gold rush, so it was seen as fitting for it to have a museum. It started in two 'Museum Rooms' in the 1869 Hokitika Town Hall building, which was operated from at least 1877 by the Westland Institute. From 1900 the honorary curator of the museum was Dr Herbert Macandrew.

The Museum Room was requisitioned by the Hokitika Borough Council in 1946. In 1952 a museum committee was established, led by Bob Drummond, to find a dedicated space to house the museum. The "Hokitika Pioneer Museum" opened in 1960, consisting of one room in the 1908 Hokitika Carnegie Library.

Donations to the new museum room were so enthusiastic that what had begun a planned extension became a plan for a new building. Fundraising began in 1964 for a museum building to be built behind the Carnegie Library, and the equivalent of $450,000 in 2013 dollars was raised by public subscriptions, service clubs, and a grant from the Department of Internal Affairs. The West Coast Historical Museum opened in the new building on 20 December 1973, the anniversary of Hokitika's founding in 1864. The speaker was Roger Duff, director of Canterbury Museum. The building had an entrance on Tancred Street with two display halls separated by a courtyard arboretum. It was open seven days and had a 30c entrance fee. A posthumous gift of books by William Heinz in 1977 established the core of a research centre.

== Carnegie Building ==
The Carnegie Building had been erected as a public library using a 1905 grant from Andrew Carnegie's library philanthropy.

By the time the new museum building was completed, the Carnegie Library was nearly derelict, and not part of the new museum. After being empty for 20 years it was restored in the 1990s, through the efforts of Carnegie Building Restoration Committee and Heritage Hokitika. The restoration cost $600,000, and involved internal bracing and replacement of the parapets and roof pagoda with plastered-over plastic for earthquake safety.

The Museum was able to move back into what was now known as the Carnegie Building in 1998, with one of the 1973 galleries becoming collections storage and the museum entrance moved to Hamilton Street. The building housed a public Carnegie Gallery for community art exhibitions, as well an i-Site information centre. In 2010 the museum revived its original name, becoming the Hokitika Museum once more.

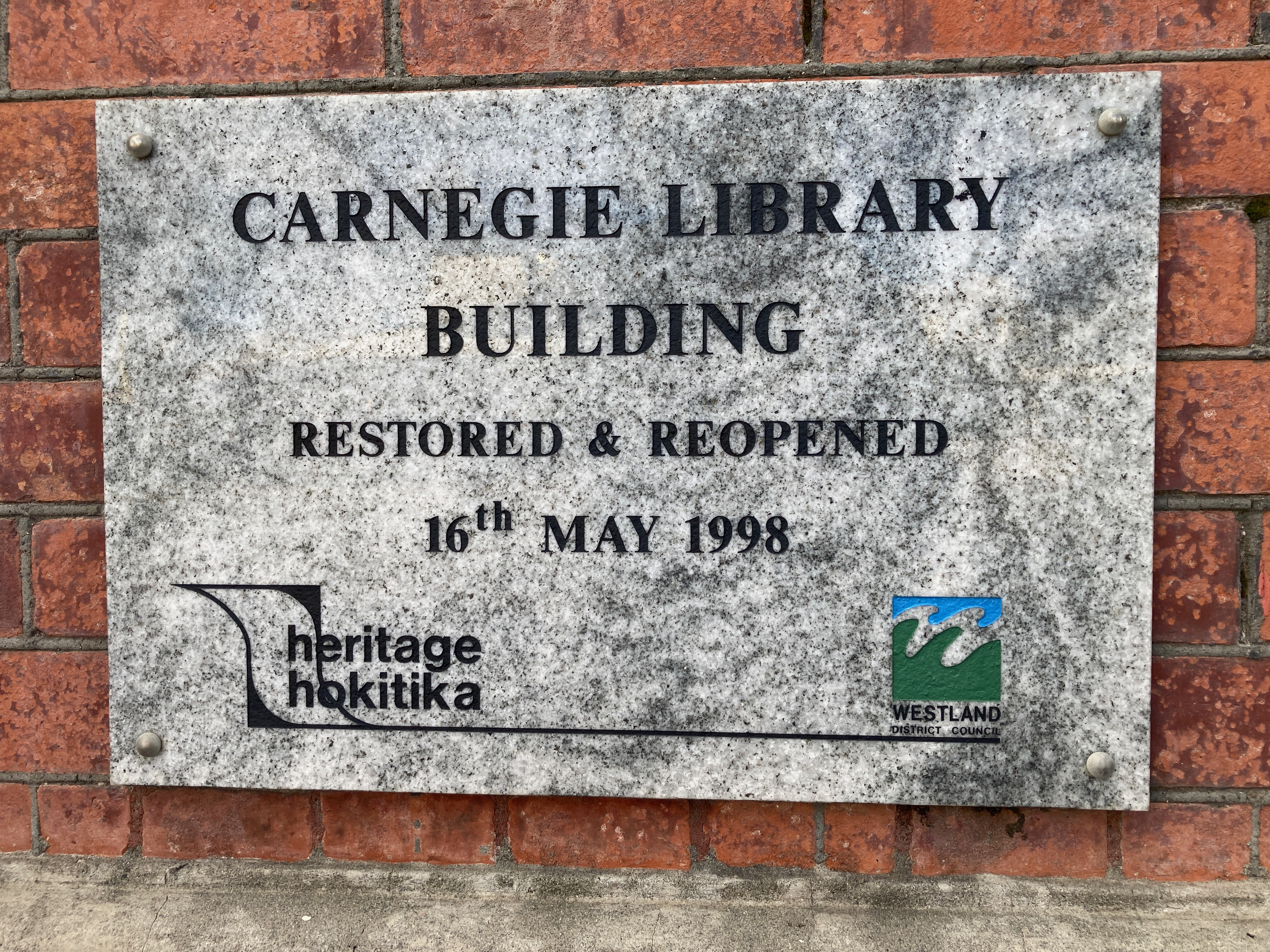
1998 plaque

In September 2016 a seismic assessment of the Carnegie Building found it was at only 12 per cent of the new required building standard (NBS). The restoration in the 1990s had brought it up to 50 per cent of the 1991 Building Act standard, but those standards were revised following the 2010–2011 Christchurch earthquakes. The report was reviewed, and the building reassessed at perhaps 28 per cent of the NBS, but still short of the minimum standard of 34 per cent. The Carnegie building was declared earthquake-prone and closed under section 124 of the Building Act. Staff were rehoused in Drummond Hall, the name for the 1973 storage area, and the Museum Research Facility at 17 Revell Street.

The council unanimously decided to upgrade the building at a cost of $500,000 The loss of retail sales and admission charges was estimated to cost $52,000 per year; $47,000 in 2017. Just before its closure for earthquake strengthening the museum had 17,000 visitors a year. In October 2020 the government Regional Culture and Heritage Fund gave the Westland District Council $794,830 to help upgrade the Carnegie Building to 100% of the new building standard. The building continued to be staffed temporarily with limited displays and community exhibitions, and earthquake strengthening was scheduled to begin in February 2021. By June the $2 million refurbishment project had begun, with new concrete foundations and steel wall supports. In September contractors discovered additional damage to the roof and determined that the decorative external parapets would need to be replaced.

== Heritage registration ==
On 11 December 2003, the Carnegie Building was registered by the New Zealand Historic Places Trust (since renamed Heritage New Zealand) as a Category II structure, with registration number 1702. The reasons given were its historical significance as a gift from Andrew Carnegie, the quality and grandeur of the design which highlighted the importance of the town, its high esteem in the community as expressed by the significant effort to restore and keep it, and its scale which made it one of the town's landmark buildings; it has been described as the "most-photographed building in Hokitika". It is listed as an historic place in the Westland District Plan.

== Staffing ==
When the new museum building opened in 1973 it had for the first time a full-time paid director, who answered to a management committee with representatives from Westland County Council and Westland Borough Council; these merged in 1989 to become Westland District Council. The manager of the West Coast Historical Museum in the early 1990s was Claudia Landis. Up until mid-1994 the museum had been open 364 days a year; that year it switched to opening Mondays to Fridays during the winter.

In 2016, the museum employed 10 staff (equivalent of four full time positions), with Julia Bradshaw as director. After eight years, Bradshaw left in March 2017 to become Senior Curator of Human History at Canterbury Museum. Commercial tourism operator Destination Westland took over management of the museum and i-Site in July 2018, and in November 2018 appointed Máire Hearty as museum services manager and Judith Taylor as director – both part-time positions – filling an 18-month vacancy. Both positions were then axed by Destination Westland less than a year later in June 2019.

In September 2020 the Westland District Council announced it would take over management of the museum from Destination Westland, along with its $266,000 budget. After much debate the Council resolved to purchase a nearby building at 11 Weld Street and combine the museum with the Westland District Library as the Westland Discovery Centre / Pakiwaitara.

== Collections ==
The museum's collection is largely historical objects relating to Westland District, as well a large photographic archive. It is worth an estimated $2 million. Only about 5% was catalogued as of June 2019.

- On display is a 1:24 Meccano model of the Grey River gold dredge, built by local Blake Huffam. Huffam was born in Ikamatua and had made Meccano models in his childhood. He was employed on the dredge in the early 1950s and made detailed measurements of it, completing the model in 1956 after 3000 hours of work. The Mayor of Hokitika Jack Richards requested the Hokitika Museum display the model in 1972, and it was loaned and finally donated to the museum shortly before Huffam's death in 2011.
- New Zealand's oldest working television, built from a kitset in 1958
- Costumes, props, and set from the six-part BBC/TVNZ series The Luminaries.
Hokitika Museum gallery
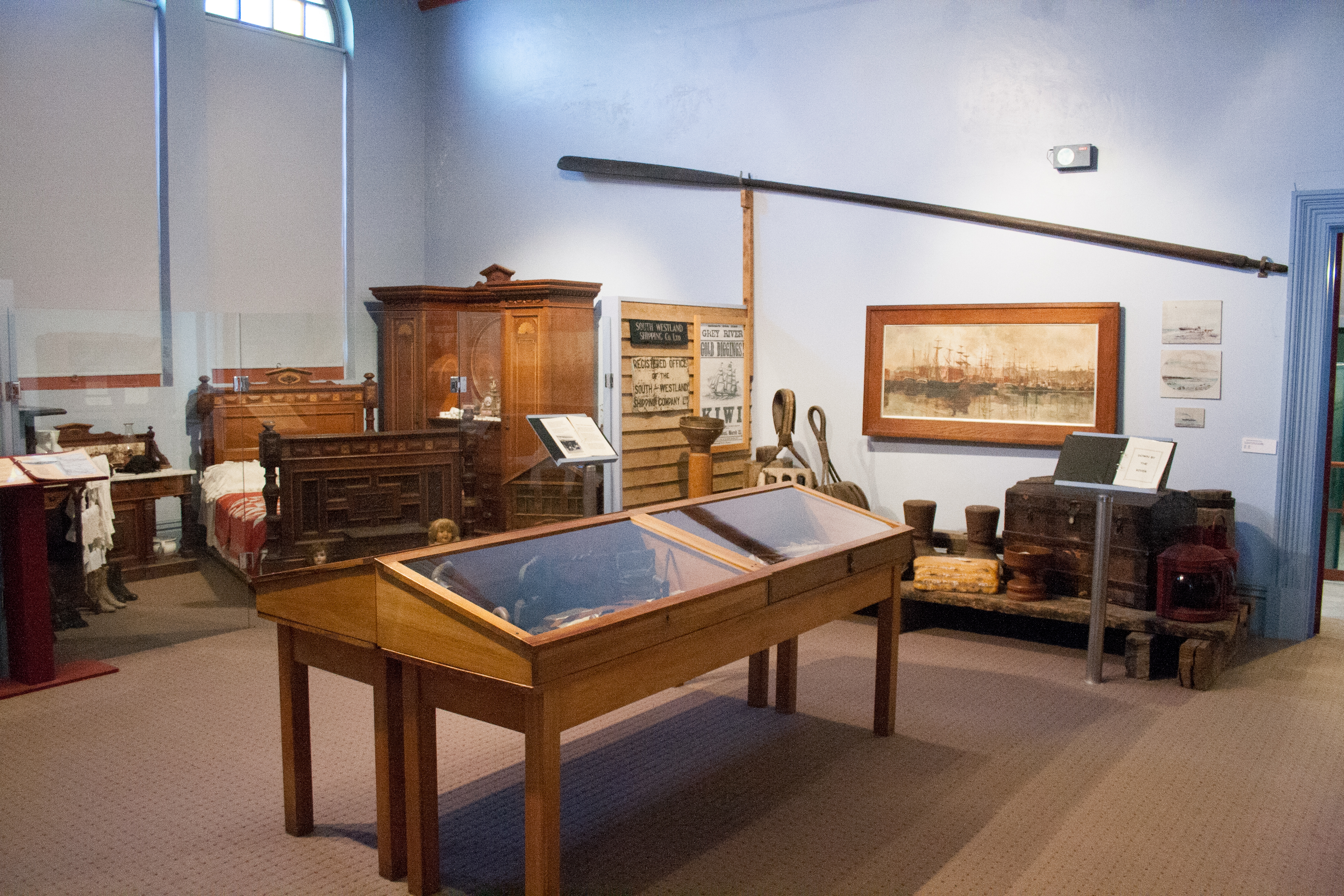
Hokitika Museum interior

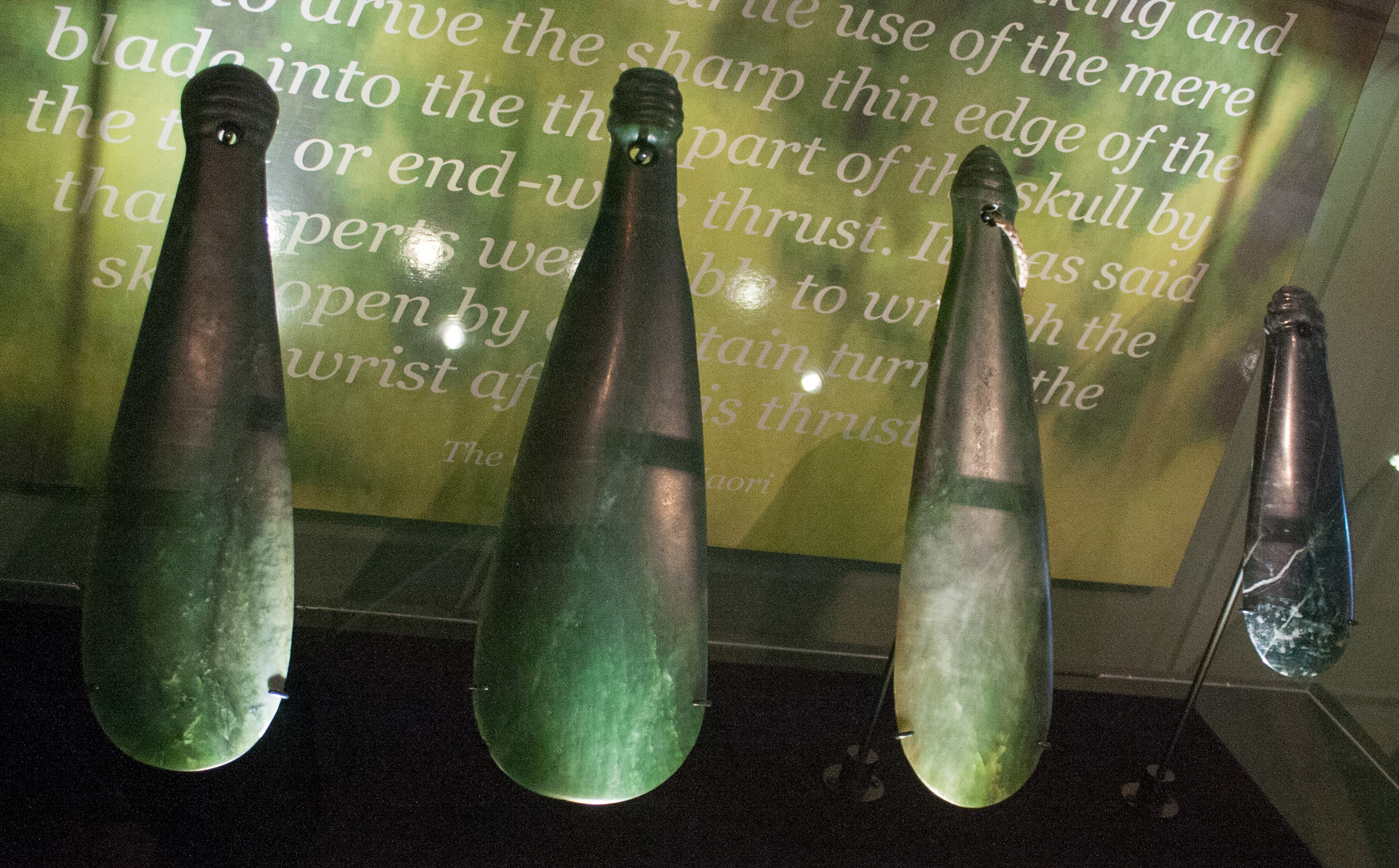
Mere of pounamu in Hokitika Museum

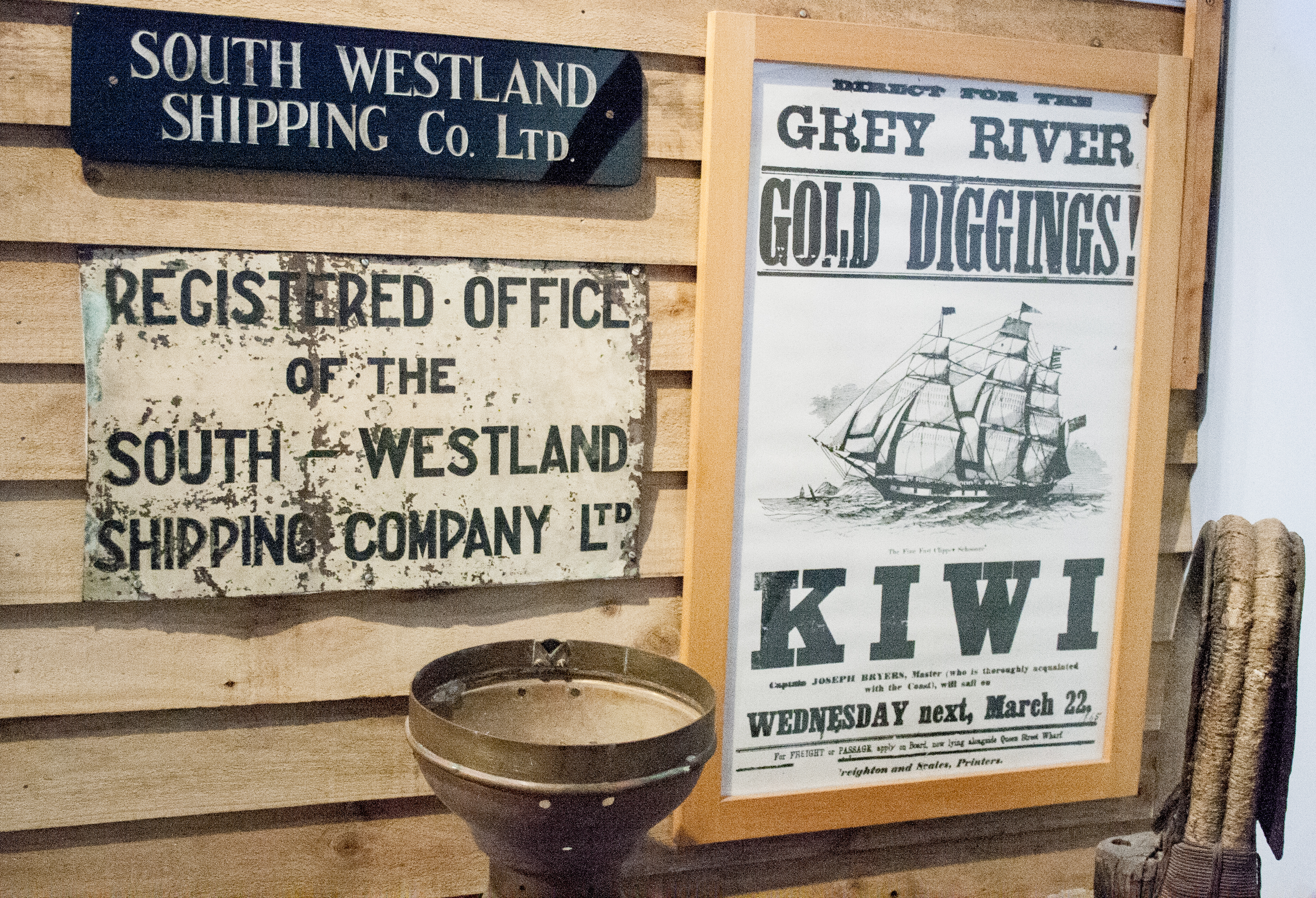
Hokitika Museum objects
