= Crush (1992 film) =

1992 film

- Directed by: Alison Maclean
- Written by: Alison Maclean; Anne Kennedy
- Produced by: Trevor Haysom; Bridget Ikin
- Starring: Marcia Gay Harden; William Zappa; Donogh Rees; Caitlin Bossley
- Cinematography: Dion Beebe
- Edited by: John Gilbert
- Music by: Antony Partos
- Release date: 15 September 1992
- Running time: 97 minutes
- Country: New Zealand
- Language: English

Crush is a 1992 New Zealand drama film directed by Alison Maclean. It was winner of four film awards and was entered into the 1992 Cannes Film Festival.

== Plot ==
While driving through New Zealand so that literary critic Christina can interview author Colin Iseman, Lane crashes their car. Christina is hospitalized with severe injuries while Lane is able to walk away with only a mild head injury.

The following day Lane goes to Colin's home where she meets Colin's teenage daughter Angela, whom she initially mistakes for a boy. Lane takes Angela out drinking and the two quickly become friends. After meeting her briefly when she spends the night Colin becomes infatuated with her and the two sleep together.

In the meantime, Christina slowly recovers and starts to remember the events, but has limited mental capabilities. The four (Colin, Lane, Angela, and Christina) go on a trip to a forest, where Christina stands up from the wheelchair and starts to walk again with the help of Lane, who confesses she is very sorry for the accident and tries to help her make her first steps again. The two women walk to a wooden overlook built above a cascade, and Christina pushes an absent-minded Lane over the overlook's handrail and into the abyss. The entire scene is watched by Angela from a distance, who then runs to the spot, looks at the collapsed Christina, then down the whirling cascade waters, but cannot see whether Lane has survived or not. This is where the film ends.

== Cast ==
- Marcia Gay Harden as Lane
- Donogh Rees as Christina
- Caitlin Bossley as Angela Iseman
- William Zappa as Colin Iseman
- Pete Smith as Horse
- Jon Brazier as Arthur
- Geoffrey Southern as Patient
- Shirley Wilson as Intensive care nurse
- Denise Lyness as Physiotherapy nurse
- Jennifer Karehana as Physio nurse
- David Stott as Stephen
- Harata Solomon as Aunty Bet
- Caroline De Lore as Colleen
- Trish Howie as Nurse
- Phil McLachlan as Ward sister
- Wayne McGoram as Nurse (as Wayne McCoram)

== Music ==
- Composer: Antony Partos
- Orchestrator: Derek Williams
- Conductor: Dobbs Franks
- Musicians: Australian Opera and Ballet Orchestra

== Awards ==
New Zealand Film and TV Awards (I) 1993

Film award wins

- Best Female Dramatic Performance: Caitlin Bossley
- Best Female Supporting Performance: Donogh Rees
- Best Soundtrack: Greg Bell, Kit Rollings, Mike Hopkins
- Best Film Score: Antony Partos
