= The Kills (novel) =

2013 novel by Richard House

- First edition
- Author: Richard House
- Language: English
- Genre: Novel
- Publisher: Picador
- Publication place: United Kingdom

The Kills is a novel by Richard House, published in 2013.

It was longlisted for the Man Booker Prize for Fiction in 2013 Man Booker Prize, House's first nomination.

== Content ==
"The Kill" is a stand-alone novel in a series of four which makes up "The Kills". Richard House created his own digital and audio content to run alongside all four parts - "Sutler", "The Massive", "The Kill", and "The Hit". The narrative deals with Stephen Lawrence Sutler on the run from mysterious forces, incorporating an Iraqi military base and a murder in Italy

== Reviews ==
Reviewing "Sutler" for The Guardian, Anna Baddeley wrote...

...[M]y first set of doubts evaporated a few pages in. Sutler races along but has depth too, in its characters and filmic description of landscape...As for the enhancements … while I loved the short films of Cuba, Istanbul and Reims Cathedral that cropped up every few chapters, their effect was more to make me yearn for a holiday than add anything to the story. If you're going to the trouble of embedding audio and video, then go the whole hog and make it integral to the plot.

Also writing in The Guardian, Kate Pullinger found The Kills to be "a gripping, hallucinogenic – and enormous – novel", and that, "The digital edition is far and away the better way to read this novel; the first two books in particular are augmented by a series of short films embedded on the page, often with text overlaid, as well as animations and audio clips. For example, listening to the phone messages left by one character's mother as she tries to cajole him into contacting her, before she understands that he is in danger, adds an emotional jolt to the text. Throughout, the simple yet elegant enhancements work to take us beyond the page, adding depth and texture to the story. This is the first time I've read a digital edition of a primarily text-based novel where I've thought: yes, this works". Pullinger judged that the first two parts, Sutler and The Massive, "provide a wholly original view of our involvement in the Iraq conflict", but was less convinced by the third, The Kill, saying, "House has a great ability to create vivid characters, and the novel teems with them. But the writing in this third book is too abundant – there is simply too much story".

Jake Kerridge, reviewing the entire book in UK newspaper The Daily Telegraph, found: "For all its bulk The Kills proves easily digestible, as it is not so much a novel as four shortish, tangentially connected novels in one". He added that it is, "a hugely convoluted work in which dozens of characters execute a dance that has obviously been minutely choreographed, although one that to the reader increasingly seems to appear dizzyingly random. Motives get more shadowy and the lines between fantasy and reality are blurred; ambiguity becomes the key note. The House method of storytelling is to create brilliantly realised characters, focus on them for a brief, intense period, and then abandon them, often leaving their fates obscure". Kerridge concluded, "[…] it is well worth ejecting five or six conventional thrillers from your holiday luggage and devoting yourself to The Kills for a few days. Like all the best thrillers, it takes you on a hell of a ride, even if by the end you’re not quite sure where exactly it is you’ve arrived at".

In The Independent, Jonathan Gibbs wrote that, "Richard House’s Man Booker-longlisted novel stands out from the pile, and not just for its length: 1,003 pages. It is a ‘novel in four books’, also available as separate e-books, with additional multimedia content online or embedded, although there is more than enough going on between the covers. As a whole, The Kills is an ambitious and complex meta-thriller that spins its many stories like plates, tantalising you at every turn with the thought that it might all be one big story, if only you could see through the noise to the pattern behind". He added that, "The whole book is written with this slightly reserved attention to detail, as if the author can’t quite bring himself to be either fully thriller-ish, or fully poetic. You feel the tug of John le Carré in one direction, and Don DeLillo in the other. The commentary on the iniquities of the occupation of Iraq, too, is worn lightly. The fourth book, The Hit, picks up plot lines from the first and second, but it’s Book Three, The Kill that really threatens to turn the whole novel into a kind of Möbius strip, albeit one with frayed edges". Gibbs concluded by saying, "It all gets very confusing, and for those who enjoy readerly confusion this is a real treat. The Kills is a page-turner, but the pages turn back as much as forwards, as you chase up echoes and repetitions – long-forgotten names and places, but also wasps, the smell of jasmine, the gesture of pulling a handbag strap over a shoulder – that might be clues, might be red herrings, might be the product of my own fevered mind. It’s a book that seems built to inspire internet forums devoted to its marginalia and ‘true meaning’, and a book absolutely to be read twice over. But there’s always the risk, isn’t there, that the red herrings were more fun than the bare, revealed truth?"
