= The Rehearsal (2016 film) =

2016 film

- Film poster
- Directed by: Alison Maclean
- Written by: Alison Maclean; Emily Perkins
- Produced by: Bridget Ikin; Trevor Haysom
- Starring: James Rolleston; Kerry Fox
- Cinematography: Andrew Commis
- Edited by: Jonno Woodford-Robinson
- Release date: 23 July 2016
- Running time: 102 minutes
- Country: New Zealand
- Language: English

The Rehearsal is a 2016 New Zealand drama film directed by Alison Maclean. It is based on Eleanor Catton's novel of the same name. It was screened in the Contemporary World Cinema section at the 2016 Toronto International Film Festival.

== Plot ==
The instructors for the New Zealand drama school are selecting the first-year students. Stanley is admitted. The teacher Hanna is hard on him when he fails to add any emotion to his lines with Frankie. Shy and reserved Stanley meets his two roommates, William and Theo. Teacher Livia wants him to use life experiences to act authentically. Add a "Fuck you" and get physical. This is an acting school.

A sex scandal breaks exposing married tennis pro George Saladin and his star student Victoria. Stanley meets Isolde and they exchange phone numbers. Stanley is assigned to a five-member group acting project. He meets with Hanna and does not connect with this teacher. She wants him to try harder and dig deeper. After lunch with his psychologist father, he does a role playing his father who likes to tell bad jokes. Dad does not want his son to be an actor. Hanna really liked his performance and gave him a book from her own library to read. She tells him acting is hard and he must go all the way. Keep going. Finally he has started acting.

Victoria and Isolde are sisters and they talk a little about the scandal. Isolde tells her sister that she likes Stanley. Later Isolde tells Stanley she had seen Saladin with her sister. There was no forced sex and it looked consensual to her. Stanley's group has decided to use the sex scandal as their acting project. Stanley has not told Isolde and William reminds him she should know.

The next in class assignment is to act an intimate scene. William tells of an Easter dinner event where his father humiliates his mother. Hanna did not like it. He only told a story. Intimacy requires the actor to bear his soul. There must be trust. William says this class was the last place he would share intimacy. Frankie talks to coach Saladin at the coffee shop trying to get background for their project. Isolde invites Stanley and William over for a barbeque. William plays with the family dog. Victoria secretly borrows Stanley's phone to call her coach. William wants Stanley to tell Isolde about their project and once again he fails to come clean. Later the coach calls Stanley to tell Victoria that he has changed his mind. He is staying with his wife.

Hanna has heard of Stanley's girlfriend. She tells him to call off a schoolgirl crush and not embarrass the institute. He sees Isolde and asks her to return his book, but can he just have one picture. She tells him if you will find a private place, I will show you much more. They have sex. They are in love. Nonetheless, the tennis project continues mocking teacher sex with a student. During teacher Perry's class, they announce that William has died in a car crash.

At William's memorial service, Stanley sees Isolde kissing a girl. She tells him that she is sorry but he walks away. Later at a rehearsal, Marnie asks Stanley did he drop Isolde because of the other girl or because of their play. He says she was just too young. There was dissent at a student assembly. Teacher Livia takes the student's side and thinks Dean Hanna Bauer cares more about her new theatre than student grief. In fact she walks out. Later in the parking lot, Hanna tells Stanley that the sex scandal is a great subject even though the coach has pleaded guilty. She calls it great agent bait. Isolde goes to the school looking for Stanley and finds all the set decoration for the play. She feels betrayed.

Stanley finally goes to the Isolde home and tells them about the play. The father Stephen cannot believe how they can violate the family's privacy. Never contact either of his daughters and get out of their home. He explains the performance is cancelled. Stanley tells Isolde he loves her. The night of the performance the curtain parts a small opening, the music starts and the house lights come on. The audience waits. Frankie walks down the isle and walks through the curtain. Minutes later another woman walks down the aisle and through the curtain. Stanley walks down one aisle and Isolde walks down another and they jointly enter the curtain. William loved the "First Follow Technique" and more and more of the audience walked on stage and through the curtain.

== Cast ==
- James Rolleston as Stanley Phillips
- Kerry Fox as Hannah Bauer
- Alice Englert as Thomasin
- Ella Edward as Isolde
- Errol Shand as George Saladin
- Miranda Harcourt as Livia
- Cohen Holloway as Michael Perry
- Kieran Charnock as William
- Rachel Roberts as Victoria
- Marlon Williams as Theo
- Scotty Cotter as Oscar
- Michelle Ny as Frankie

== Critical reception ==
On review aggregator website Rotten Tomatoes, the film holds 82% approval rating, based on 22 reviews with an average rating of 6.1/10.

Glenn Kenny, reviewing the film for The New York Times, said it "convincingly conveys the raw feelings that result when life and art rub too fiercely against each other, and how the wounds are that much more severe when you add adolescence to the mix". He praised Rolleston's performance, but found the finale "confounding": "Your mileage may vary, but for myself The Rehearsal delivers a good hour and a half of engagement and intrigue only to top it off with a cherry that left me asking 'Really?'"

Ignatiy Vishnevetsky of The A.V. Club gave it a "C" grade.

Besides the national praise, there was also positive criticism from international venues as well. Case in point, Sarah Ward of Screen Daily praised the director, Alison Maclean, for crafting "a drama that's as piercing as it is potent".

According to Craig Mathieson of The Age "[the group exercises and rehearsals are shot with an expressive clarity that gets at how they unite the students so that they can work together".

Francesca Rudkin of The New Zealand Herald stated that "Edward's startling authenticity and composure as Isolde means it's hard to take your eyes off her, while Michelle Ny, Alice Englert, singer Marlon Williams and Rachel Roberts make their mark".

Other critics were of different opinions. Chuck Bowen of Slant Magazine called the film "a civics lesson", which, according to him, "tethers a promising tale of artistic toil to the strictures of melodrama".
