= Eleanor Catton =

New Zealand novelist and screenwriter

Eleanor Catton MNZM
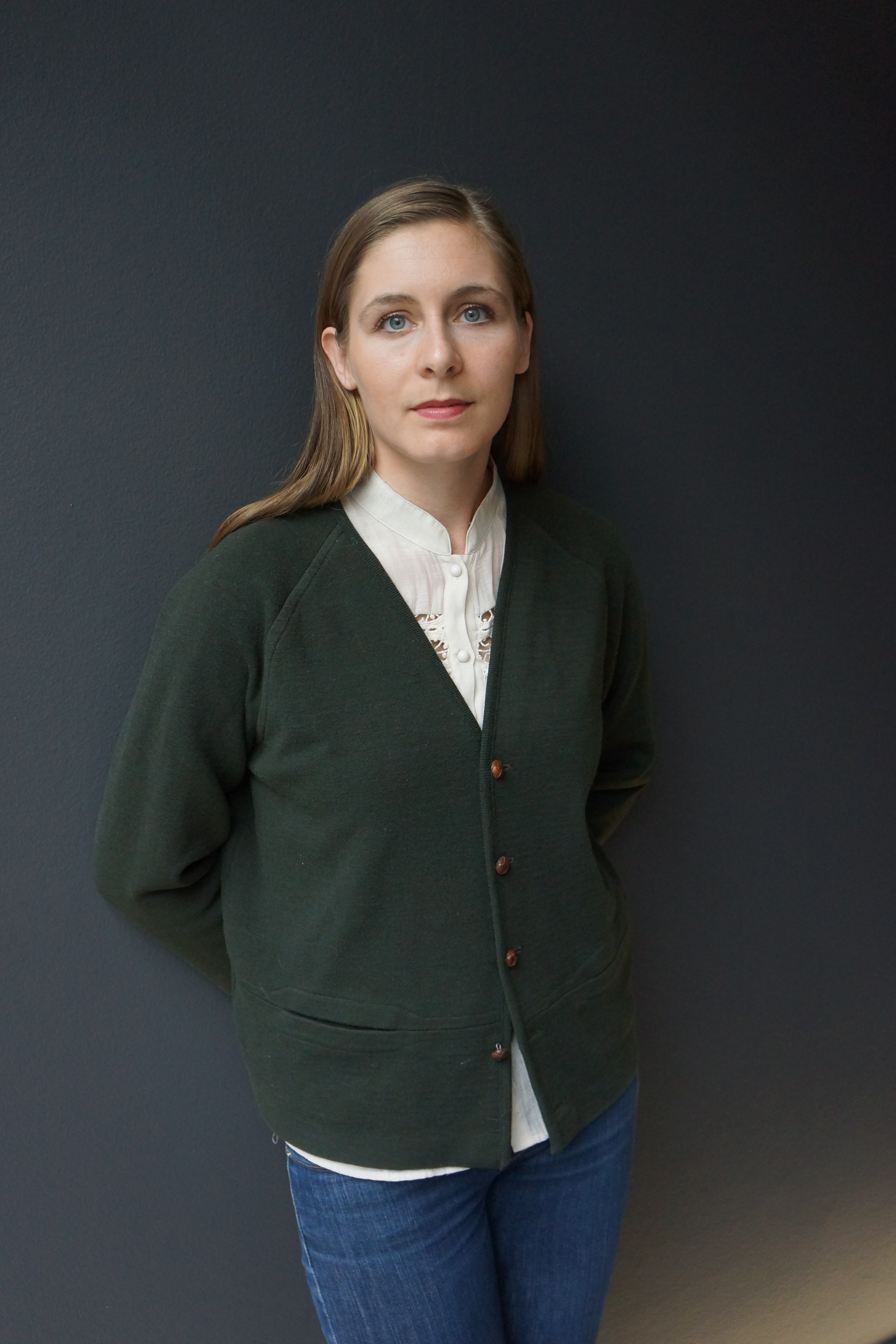
- Eleanor Catton in 2012
- Born: Eleanor Frances Catton; 1985 (age 40–41); London, Ontario, Canada
- Education: University of Canterbury (BA); Victoria University of Wellington (BA Hons, MA); University of Iowa (MFA)
- Occupation: Novelist
- Writing career
- Notable works: The Rehearsal; The Luminaries; Birnam Wood
- Notable awards: 2013 Booker Prize
- Eleanor Catton's voice from the BBC programme Woman's Hour, 9 September 2013.

Eleanor Catton MNZM (born 1985) is a New Zealand novelist and screenwriter. Born in Canada, Catton moved to New Zealand as a child and grew up in Christchurch. She completed a master's degree in creative writing at the International Institute of Modern Letters. Her award-winning debut novel, The Rehearsal, written as her Master's thesis, was published in 2008, and has been adapted into a 2016 film of the same name. Her second novel, The Luminaries, won the 2013 Booker Prize, making Catton the youngest author ever to win the prize (at age 28) and only the second New Zealander. It was subsequently adapted into a television miniseries, with Catton as screenwriter. In 2023, she was named on the Granta Best of Young British Novelists list.

== Early life ==
Catton was born in Canada in 1985, where her father was a graduate student completing his doctorate at the University of Western Ontario on a Commonwealth scholarship. Her mother Judith is a New Zealander from Canterbury, while her father, philosopher Philip Catton, comes from Washington State in the US. Her family returned to New Zealand when she was six years old, and Catton grew up in Christchurch. Her mother was a children's librarian at the time, and the family had no TV; Catton was an avid reader and writer from an early age.

When she was aged 13 the family spent a year living in Leeds while her father was on a sabbatical at the university, and Catton attended local comprehensive Lawnswood School which she referred to as "amazing" and "gloriously rough". Back in Christchurch she attended Burnside High School, studied English at the University of Canterbury, and completed a Master's degree in Creative Writing at the International Institute of Modern Letters, Victoria University of Wellington. She is related to historian Bruce Catton.

== Literary career ==
=== The Rehearsal ===
Catton's debut novel, The Rehearsal, was published in 2008 when she was 22. Written as her Master's thesis, it deals with reactions to an affair between a male teacher and a girl at his secondary school. The Rehearsal won the 2009 Betty Trask Award in the UK, and was longlisted for the Orange Prize and on the shortlist of the Guardian First Book Award.

That year Catton was awarded a fellowship to the Iowa Writers' Workshop, where she completed her MFA and taught creative writing until 2011. In 2011, she was the Ursula Bethell Writer in Residence at the University of Canterbury, and in 2012 a writer in residence at the Michael King Writers Centre in Auckland.

In 2016, The Rehearsal was adapted into a film of the same name directed by Alison Maclean. It was screened in the Contemporary World Cinema section at the 2016 Toronto International Film Festival.

=== The Luminaries ===
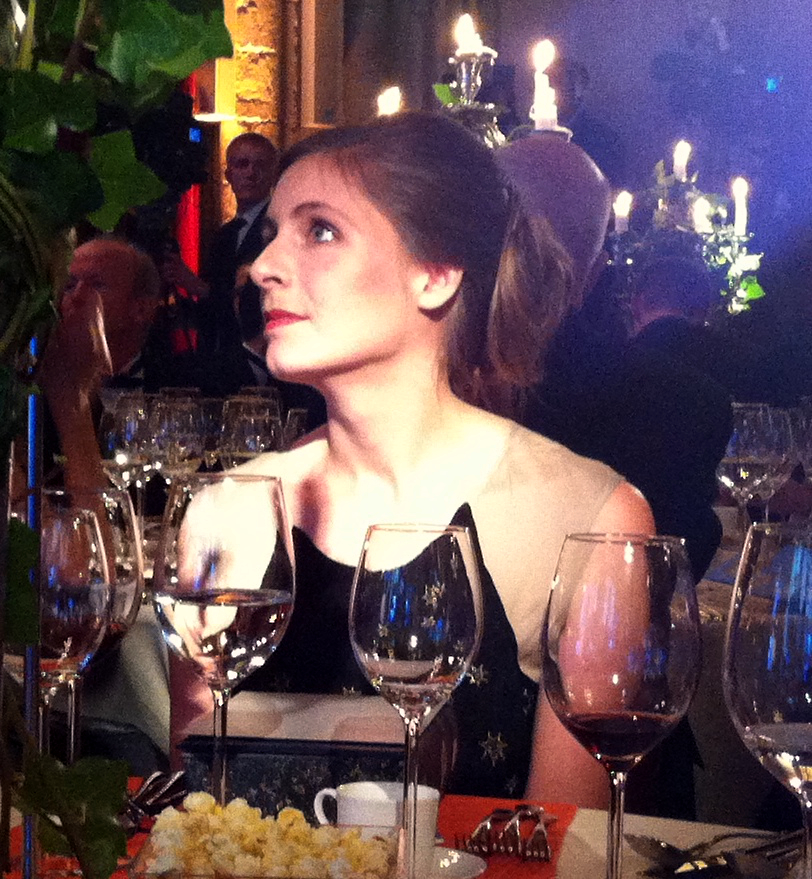
Catton at the Booker Prize ceremony in Guildhall, London, just before it was announced she had won the 2013 prize for The Luminaries.

Catton's second novel The Luminaries was begun at the Iowa Writers' Workshop, when she was 25, and published in 2013. The novel is set on the goldfields of New Zealand in 1866. It was shortlisted for and subsequently won the 2013 Booker Prize, making Catton at the age of 28 the youngest author ever to win the Booker, beating more established names like Jhumpa Lahiri and Colm Tóibín. Catton was previously, at the age of 27, the youngest author ever to be shortlisted for the Booker Prize.

At 832 pages, The Luminaries was the longest work to win the prize in its 45-year history. The chair of the judges, Robert Macfarlane commented, "It's a dazzling work. It's a luminous work. It is vast without being sprawling." Jonathan Ruppin of Foyles said: "I'm confident that she is destined to be one of the most important and influential writers of her generation." Catton was presented with the prize by the Duchess of Cornwall on 15 October 2013 at Guildhall.

In November 2013 Catton was awarded the Canadian Governor General's Literary Award for fiction for The Luminaries. In January 2014 it was announced that Catton would be awarded an honorary degree of Doctor of Literature in May at Victoria University of Wellington, where she has studied. In the 2014 New Year Honours, she was appointed a Member of the New Zealand Order of Merit for services to literature.

=== Screenwriting ===
Catton made zombie movies with her friends as a teenager and participated in the 48Hours film challenge, but never studied screenwriting.

When Luminaries was adapted into a television miniseries Catton was screenwriter, an "unusual if not entirely unheard-of" arrangement. Catton wrote hundreds of drafts of the pilot episode, but in late 2015 BBC Two declined the series; she then shifted the focus to make the protagonist Anna Wetherell, a minor character in the book, and rewrote the series, which was commissioned by the BBC in mid-2016. She served as showrunner with director Claire McCarthy during filming. The six-episode TVNZ and BBC series debuted on 17 May 2020.

Catton also wrote the screenplay for the 2020 film version of Emma, adapted from Jane Austen's novel. She admitted she had never actually read the novel when approached to write the screenplay, but was familiar with more recent adaptations, including the film Clueless.

=== Birnam Wood ===
Catton's third novel, Birnam Wood, was published in February 2023. The title is taken from Macbeth, and Catton has said the novel draws inspiration from the play. It is a contemporary thriller about a group of young climate activists who call themselves Birnam Wood.

The novel was shortlisted for the 2023 Giller Prize. The New York Times named it one of the 100 Notable Books of 2023.

== Politics ==
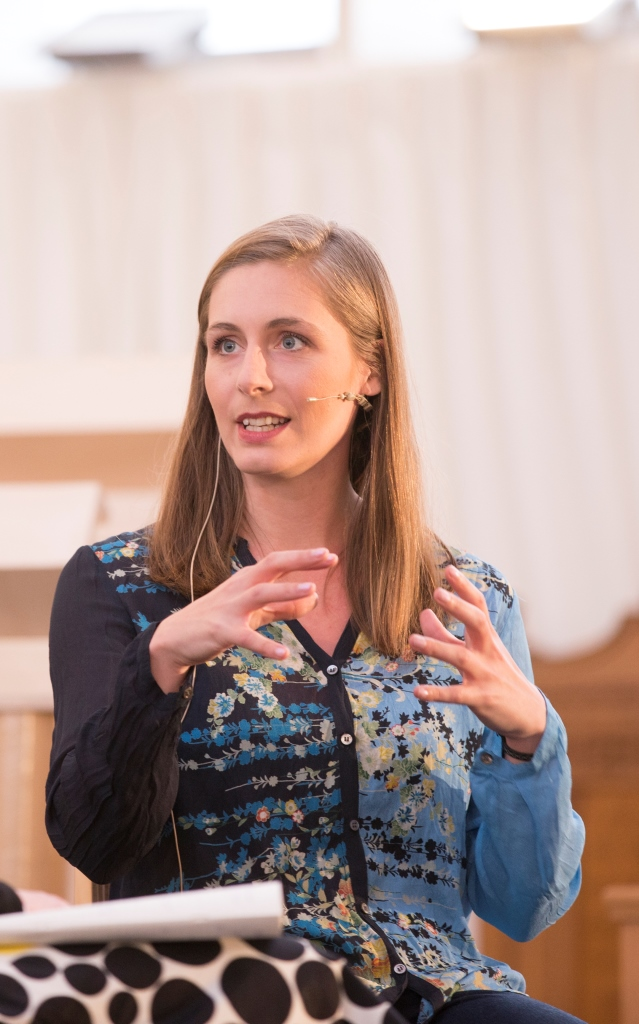
Catton at WORD Christchurch 2014 Gala opening

In an interview at the Jaipur Literary Festival in January 2015, Catton said that the governments of Australia, Canada and New Zealand were led by "neo-liberal, profit-obsessed, very shallow, very money-hungry politicians who do not care about culture... They care about short-term gains. They would destroy the planet in order to be able to have the life they want. I feel very angry with my Government".

Prime Minister John Key said he was disappointed at Catton's lack of respect for his Government and claimed she was aligned with the Green Party. The next day he said her views should not be given any more credence than those of the Peter "The Mad Butcher" Leitch or Richie McCaw.

In January 2015, on air RadioLive host Sean Plunket called Catton a traitor and an "ungrateful hua", a Māori slang word which some listeners mistook for "whore". The Taxpayers' Union also released a media statement showing Catton had received around $50,000 in Creative New Zealand support over her career, and argued that "if Ms Catton isn't thankful for the support by the New Zealand Government while she wrote The Luminaries, maybe she should use some of the substantial royalties to pay the money back".

In a blog post responding to the affair, Catton commented that her reported remarks were a condensed part of a larger interview, and she was puzzled why her comment at the Jaipur festival had generated such controversy: "I’ve been speaking freely to foreign journalists ever since I was first published overseas, and have criticised the Key government, neo-liberal values, and our culture of anti-intellectualism many times." She continued:

In future interviews with foreign media, I will of course discuss the inflammatory, vicious, and patronising things that have been broadcast and published in New Zealand this week. I will of course discuss the frightening swiftness with which the powerful Right move to discredit and silence those who question them, and the culture of fear and hysteria that prevails. But I will hope for better, and demand it.

The criticism of Catton caused a media storm, including the publication of numerous cartoons, and was termed "Cattongate" by political commentator Bryce Edwards. Edwards quoted numerous other commentators who supported Catton's right to express her views, and said the controversy reflected the hollowness of public debate in New Zealand and of the media and politics.

== Personal life ==
Catton met US-born poet Steven Toussaint at the Iowa Writers' Workshop, and Toussaint moved to New Zealand in 2011 to begin a PhD in US avant-garde poetry at Victoria University of Wellington. The couple later lived in Mount Eden while Catton taught creative writing part-time at the Manukau Institute of Technology. Catton describes Toussaint as the first reader of her drafts, and he prevailed in an argument over whether one character in The Luminaries should be killed off. They married on 3 January 2016. As of 2023, the couple live in Cambridge, England, with their daughter.

== Philanthropy ==
In 2014 Catton used her winnings from the New Zealand Post Book Awards to establish the Lancewood/Horoeka Grant. The grant offers a stipend to emerging writers with the aim of providing "the means and opportunity not to write, but to read, and to share what they learn through their reading with their colleagues in the arts". Recipients have included Craig Cliff and Richard Meros.

== Awards and honours ==
=== Literary achievement ===
Year	Title	Award	Category	Result	Ref.
2007	—	Adam Foundation Prize in Creative Writing	—	Won	
2007	Necropolis	Sunday Star-Times Short Story Competition	—	Won	
2009	The Rehearsal	Betty Trask Prize and Awards	Betty Trask Award	Won	
2009	The Rehearsal	Guardian First Book Award	—	Shortlisted	
2009	The Rehearsal	Montana New Zealand Book Awards	First Book Award	Won	
2009	The Rehearsal	Orange Prize	—	Longlisted	
2010	The Rehearsal	Amazon.ca First Novel Award	—	Won	
2013	The Luminaries	Booker Prize	—	Won	
2013	The Luminaries	Governor General's Awards	English-language fiction	Won	
2014	The Luminaries	New Zealand Post Book Awards	Fiction Award	Won	
2014	The Luminaries	New Zealand Post Book Awards	People's Choice Award	Won	
2014	The Luminaries	Walter Scott Prize	—	Shortlisted	
2024	Birnam Wood	International Dublin Literary Award	—	Longlisted	
2024	Birnam Wood	Jann Medlicott Acorn Prize for Fiction	—	Shortlisted	

=== Honors ===
- 2014 Honorary Doctor DLitt from Victoria University
- 2023 Granta Best of Young British Novelists

== Works ==
=== Novels ===
- Catton, Eleanor (2008). The Rehearsal. Wellington, New Zealand: Victoria University Press. ISBN 9783716026328.
- Catton, Eleanor (2013). The Luminaries. Wellington, New Zealand: Victoria University Press. ISBN 9781847084316.
- Catton, Eleanor (2023). Birnam Wood. London, United Kingdom: Granta Books. ISBN 9781783789696.
- Doubtful Sound (TBC)

=== Short stories ===
- Various short stories published in Best New Zealand Fiction Vol. 5 (2008); the Penguin Book of Contemporary New Zealand Short Stories (2009), Granta issue 106 (Summer 2009) and issue 163 (Spring 2023, Best of Young British Novelists).

=== Films ===
- Emma (2020). Directed by Autumn de Wilde.
- Jack of Spades (2027). Directed by Joel Coen.
