= Alison Maclean =

Canadian film director (born 1958)

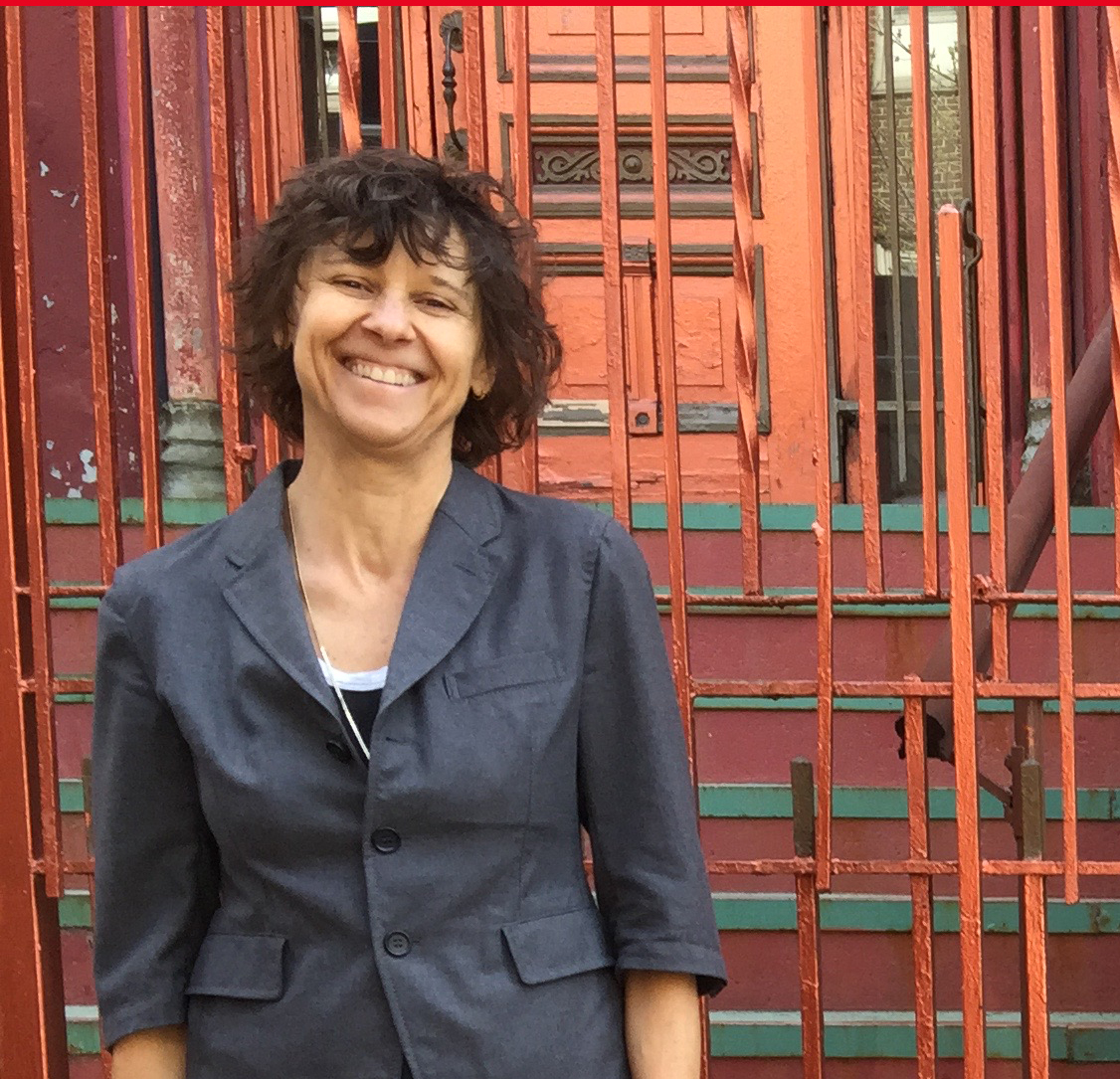
- Alison McLean 2015
- Born: July 31, 1958 (age 68); Ottawa, Ontario, Canada
- Occupation: Film director
- Years active: 1989-present

Alison Maclean (born July 31, 1958) is a Canadian-New Zealand film director of music videos, short films, television (episodes of Sex and the City, The Tudors, Homicide: Life on the Street), commercials and feature films. Her works include the music video "Torn" (Natalie Imbruglia, 1997), the short film Kitchen Sink (1989) and the feature films Jesus' Son (1999) (starring Billy Crudup) and Crush (1992) (starring Marcia Gay Harden). She has been the recipient of several awards (e.g. Best Short Film, Talkback (1987) and Kitchen Sink (1989), New Zealand Film Awards), and often uses themes of communication, gender roles, and power structures in her directorial and filmmaking roles.

== Early life and education ==
Maclean was born in Ottawa, Ontario, Canada, to New Zealand-born parents. As a teenager, she immigrated in 1972 to New Zealand with her parents. She later graduated from the Elam School of Fine Arts, Auckland, with a Bachelor's of Fine Arts, majoring in sculpture in 1982.

== Career ==
Maclean directed her first short film, Taunt, in 1982 and later directed the short film, Rud's Wife, in 1985. In 1987, Maclean directed Talkback, a short film centred around issues of gender and communication. Kitchen Sink, debuted at Cannes in 1989 and went on to win eight international awards. That same year, Maclean moved to Sydney, Australia.

After Maclean moved to New York in 1992, she directed her first feature film, Crush. A female-driven psychological thriller featuring themes of female relationships, power structures, and emotions at its core, the short film was entered into the 1992 Cannes Film Festival. Set in Rotorua, New Zealand, at an unspecified period in time, Maclean uses setting and cinematography to evoke feelings of uneasiness and distress in what initially appears to be a scenic, lighthearted film.

Starring Marcia Gay Harden, Maclean's Crush has been subject of much criticism and inquiry, particularly in feminist debate and film theory. The focus of these debates has been centred around theories of gaze control and female aggression, as demonstrated by the three main female characters: Lane (Marcia Gay Harden), Christina (Donogh Rees), and Angela (Caitlin Bossley). The film's portrayal of female violence, friendship, and homosexual desire contrast conventional expectations of women, attracting both backlash and support for the film in public and critical discussion.

After several years developing various projects, including another short film, Positive (1993), she landed her second feature film, Jesus' Son (1999). Starring Billy Crudup and Samantha Morton (with Holly Hunter, Dennis Hopper, Denis Leary and Jack Black in supporting roles), the film is based on the short story collection by cult US writer Denis Johnson about drug addicts and addiction itself. The film received much critical attention and rewards, particularly at the Venice Film Festival in 2000.

In more recent years, Maclean has directed The Rehearsal (2016), an adaptation of New Zealand author Eleanor Catton's novel of the same name. Following Stanley through his time in an Auckland-based acting college, the film centres on his interactions with teachers, students, and his involvement in a dramatically inappropriate teacher-student affair. Maclean's film adaptation brings up questions of privacy, publicity, love, and emotions while trying to draw the line between real life and the stage. The film, compared to Catton's novel, highlights drama and theatre's ability to communicate.

Maclean has said she draws inspiration and influence from other female filmmakers, such as Maya Deren and New Zealand filmmaker Jane Campion. In her research, scholar Kathleen Dieckmann grouped Maclean in with Deren and Campion, as well as with Australian filmmaker Gillian Armstrong, for their examinations of feminism, film, and what Dieckmann describes as the characteristic darkness that undercuts many of their films.

After her success with the 1989 short film, Kitchen Sink, Maclean was noticed by Touchstone Pictures and extended a development offer. Despite its falling through, Maclean later went on to be represented by Park Pictures in New York, after being in talks with company owners Kelman Bisbee and Jonna Mattingly following her success with Crush (1992) in 1999. Though she was busy working on Jesus' Son (1999) during that same year, Maclean was deemed an asset to Park Pictures for her voice, focus, direction and style of storytelling and signed that same year.

In association with Scenarios USA, Alison Maclean directed the movie adaptation of the winning script of New York's "What's the REAL DEAL" contest for 12- to 22-year-olds, authored by Tiara Bennett.

== Filmography ==
Short Films
Title	Year	Awards
Taunt	1982	
Rud's Wife	1985	
Talkback	1987	Best Short Film: New Zealand Film Awards, 1987; Listener Television Awards, 1988.
Kitchen Sink	1989	Best Short Film: New Zealand Film Awards, 1989; Sydney Film Festival, 1989; Listener Film and Television Awards, 1989; Sitges International Film Festival (Spain), 1989; Fantasporto-Oporto International Film Festival (Portugal), 1990. Certificate of Merit: Melbourne Film Festival, 1989. Grand Prix (top prize): Tampere International Short Film Festival (Finland). Special Jury Award: Golden Gate Awards (U.S.A), 1990.
Positive	1993	
Intolerable	2003	
The Choices We Make	2007	

Feature Films
Title	Year	Awards
Crush	1992	
Jesus' Son	1999	OCIC, Little Golden Lion; Venice Film Awards, 2000. Dorothy Arzner Prize: Director's View Film Festival (U.S.A.), 2001.
Persons of Interest	2004	
The Rehearsal	2016	

TV series
Show	Year	Episode(s)
Seven Deadly Sins	1993	"Greed"
The Adventures of Pete & Pete	1995	"Dance Fever"
Beyond Belief: Fact or Fiction	1997	"The Apparition"
Homicide: Life on the Street	1997	"Birthday"
Sex and the City	1998	"Models and Mortals" "Valley of the Twenty-Something Guys"
Carnivàle	2003	"The River"
The L Word	2005	"Loyal"
The Tudors	2007	"Message to the Emperor" "Truth and Justice"
Gossip Girl	2009	"They Shoot Humphreys, Don't They?"
Michael: Every Day	2011	"Bridges" "Trust" "Heights"
The Wilds	2020–2022	"Day Twelve" "Day 30/1" "Day 34/12"

Music Videos
Song title	Artist	Year
"Torn"	Natalie Imbruglia	1997
"Big Mistake"	Natalie Imbruglia	1998
