= West Coast gold rush =

Gold rush in the South Island, New Zealand

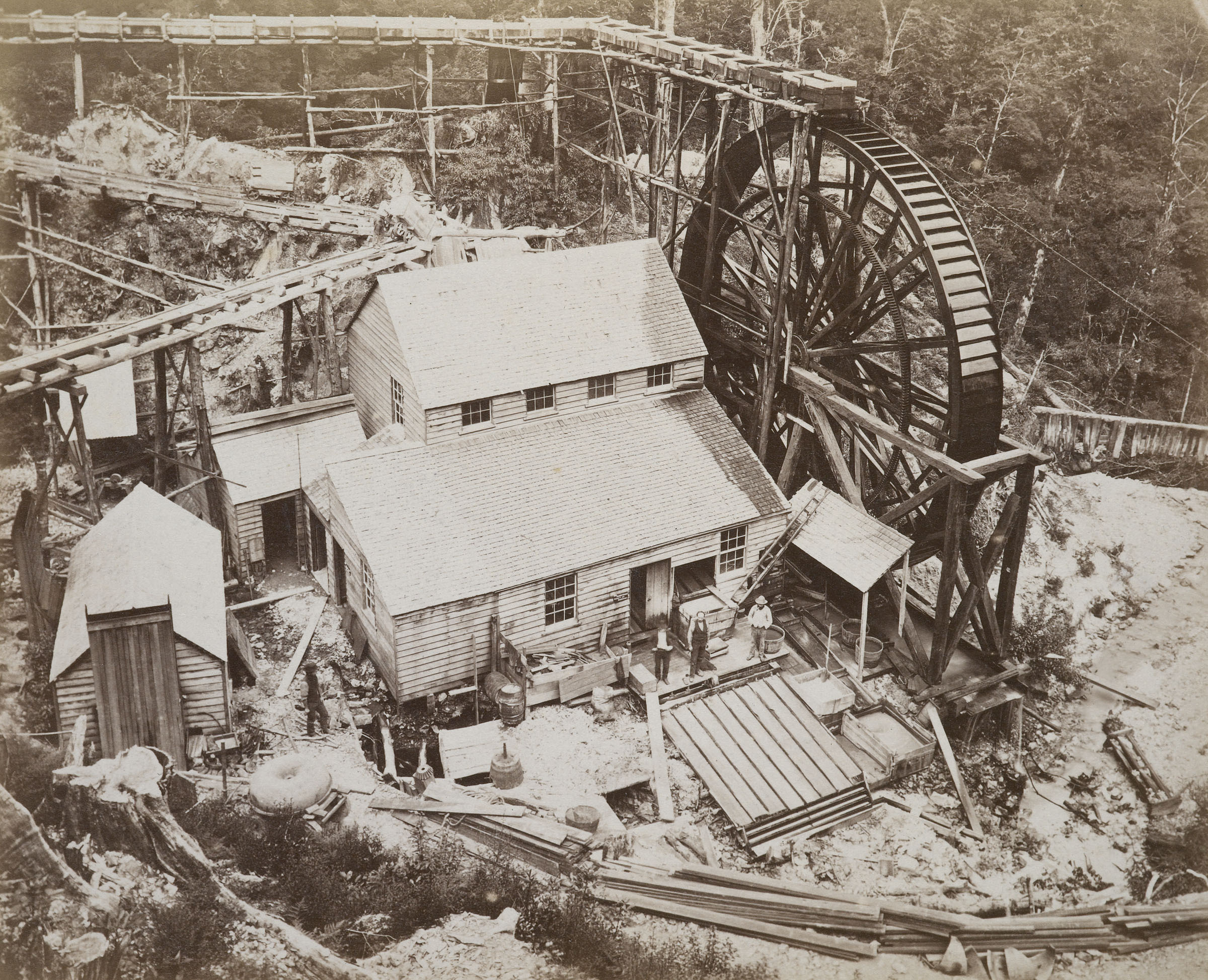
Rock crushing in Reefton, circa 1877

The West Coast Gold Rush, on the West Coast of New Zealand's South Island, lasted from 1864 to 1867.

== Description ==
The gold rush populated the area, which up until then had been visited by few Europeans. Gold was found near the Taramakau River in 1864 by two Māori, Ihaia Tainui and Haimona Taukau. In 1865–66 gold was discovered at Ōkārito, Bruce Bay (the scene of the Hunt's Duffer gold rush), around Charleston and along the Grey River.

Miners were attracted from the Otago gold rush, and from Victoria, Australia where the Victorian gold rush had nearly finished. By the end of 1864 there were an estimated 1800 prospectors on the West Coast, with many in the Hokitika area. Hokitika was in 1866 the most populous settlement in New Zealand with a population of more than 25,000, and boasted more than 100 pubs.

The Canterbury Provincial Council in Christchurch asked their provincial engineer, Edward Dobson, to examine every possible pass to the West Coast from the watersheds of the Waimakariri, Taramakau and Hurunui Rivers. After finishing his examination, Dobson declared that "Arthur's pass" was by far the most suitable to get to the gold fields: his son Arthur had discovered a pass in 1864. The provincial government decided that a road should be built between Christchurch and Hokitika over Arthur's Pass, a distance of 156 miles (251 km), and Edward Dobson was put in charge of the project. The road was opened on 20 March 1866.

In 1867 the rush began to decline, though gold mining continued on the Coast for some years. In the 1880s, quartz miners at Bullendale and Reefton were the first users of electricity in New Zealand.

The main towns on the West Coast had been established, as well as many gold rush towns like Okarito (at one time the largest town on the Coast) and Charlestown (later renamed Charleston), which both almost vanished when the miners moved on. The Coast was the second-richest gold-bearing area of New Zealand after Otago.

== In popular culture ==
Eleanor Catton's novel The Luminaries, which won the 2013 Man Booker Prize, is set in Hokitika during the West Coast Gold Rush. This setting was partly inspired by Elsie Locke's classic New Zealand children's novel The Runaway Settlers, which also features the gold rush.

In Rose Tremain's 2003 novel The Colour, a British couple emigrate to New Zealand and the husband gets swept up in the gold rush. The title refers to the gold prospectors' term for very fine particles of gold.

Hokitika Town by Charlotte Randall, published in 2011, is a novel told from the point of view of a Māori boy hanging around the pubs of Hokitika in 1865.

== See also ==
- Mining in New Zealand
