= 2013 Man Booker Prize =

Literary award

The 2013 Booker Prize for Fiction was awarded on 15 October 2013 to Eleanor Catton for her novel The Luminaries. A longlist of thirteen titles was announced on 23 July, and these were narrowed down to a shortlist of six titles, announced on 10 September. The jury was chaired by Robert Macfarlane, who was joined by Robert Douglas-Fairhurst, Natalie Haynes, Martha Kearney, and Stuart Kelly. The shortlist contained great geographical and ethnic diversity, with Zimbabwean-born NoViolet Bulawayo, Eleanor Catton of New Zealand, Jim Crace from England, Indian American Jhumpa Lahiri, Canadian-American Ruth Ozeki and Colm Tóibín of Ireland.

== Judging panel ==
On 21 November 2012, it was announced that Robert Macfarlane would chair the panel of judges that would decide the winner of the 2013 award. Macfarlane declared that he felt "very proud indeed to be chairing this prize, which has done so much to shape the modern literary landscape." On 17 December, he was joined by four other judges: biographer and critic Robert Douglas-Fairhurst, writer and broadcaster Natalie Haynes, journalist Martha Kearney, and writer, critic and reviewer Stuart Kelly. "Part of the reason the prize is heralded internationally", the announcement read, "is because the judges stand as a guarantee of literary weight and seriousness of intent." The judges' backgrounds – as academics, professional writers and journalists – were emphasized as essential to their role as reviewers. "We are all looking forward to the 10 months, 140 novels and many meetings and conversations that lie ahead of us," Macfarlane said, "as we search for the very best of contemporary fiction."

== Nominees (shortlist) ==
- NoViolet Bulawayo for We Need New Names through Chatto & Windus
- Eleanor Catton for The Luminaries through Granta
- Jim Crace for Harvest through Picador
- Jhumpa Lahiri for The Lowland through Bloomsbury Publishing
- Ruth Ozeki for A Tale for the Time Being through Canongate
- Colm Tóibín for The Testament of Mary through Viking Press

== Nominees (longlist) ==
Author	Title	Genre(s)	Country	Publisher
Tash Aw	Five Star Billionaire	Novel	Malaysia	Fourth Estate
NoViolet Bulawayo	We Need New Names	Novel	Zimbabwe	Chatto & Windus
Eleanor Catton	The Luminaries	Historical novel	New Zealand	Granta
Jim Crace	Harvest	Historical novel	United Kingdom	Picador
Eve Harris	The Marrying of Chani Kaufman	Novel	United Kingdom	Sandstone Press
Richard House	The Kills	Novel	United Kingdom	Picador
Jhumpa Lahiri	The Lowland	Novel	United Kingdom/United States	Bloomsbury Publishing
Alison MacLeod	Unexploded	Historical novel	United Kingdom	Hamish Hamilton
Colum McCann	TransAtlantic	Historical novel	Ireland	Bloomsbury Publishing
Charlotte Mendelson	Almost English	Novel	United Kingdom	Mantle
Ruth Ozeki	A Tale for the Time Being	Novel	Canada/United States	Canongate
Donal Ryan	The Spinning Heart	Novel	Ireland	Doubleday
Colm Tóibín	The Testament of Mary	Historical novella	Ireland	Viking Press

== Winner ==
On 15 October, the chair of the judges Robert Macfarlane announced that the winner of the 2013 Man Booker Prize was New Zealand author Eleanor Catton for her second novel The Luminaries. By winning, Catton became, at the age of 28, the youngest author ever to win the Booker. She was previously, at the age of 27, the youngest author ever to be shortlisted for the Man Booker Prize. At 832 pages, The Luminaries is also the longest work to win the prize in its 45-year history.

Catton is the second writer from New Zealand to win the prize, the first being Keri Hulme in 1985 with The Bone People. The judges' final decision was made after around two hours of discussion. Of The Luminaries, Macfarlane commented "It's a dazzling work. It's a luminous work. It is vast without being sprawling." Catton was presented with the prize by the Duchess of Cornwall at Guildhall in London. As winner, Catton also received award money to the sum of £50,000.

== See also ==
- List of winners and shortlisted authors of the Booker Prize for Fiction
