= Wendy Jacob =

American artist (born 1958)

Wendy W. Jacob (born 1958) is a multidisciplinary artist. She is best known for works in the areas of sculpture, public art and urban intervention.

== Life ==
Jacob was born in Rochester, New York in 1958. She received her bachelor's degree from Williams College in 1980, and her Master of Fine Arts degree from the Art Institute of Chicago. Jacob has been a faculty member at the Massachusetts Institute of Technology and Illinois State University, and taught at Massachusetts College of Art and Design. She lives and works in Cambridge, Massachusetts.

== Art career ==
Jacob has created installations and interventions in social spaces since 1989, and has developed a distinct body of sculptural works which investigate the interface between architecture and the bodies of the people and animals who inhabit the built environment. She is also a member of the Chicago-based collaborative Haha, whose work focuses on the exploration of social positions relative to a particular site, and which has produced over two dozen influential projects since the late 1980s.

One of Jacob's collaborations has been the creation of the Squeeze Chair, inspired by Temple Grandin's hug machine. For several years in the 1990s, Jacob worked with Grandin in developing furniture that squeezes or 'hugs' users.

== Exhibitions ==
Jacob has had solo exhibitions at

- the Kemper Museum of Contemporary Art (Kansas City),
- the Madison Art Center (Madison, Wisconsin, 1999),
- the Cleveland Center for Contemporary Art (1998),
- MIT List Visual Arts Center,
- the Cranbrook Art Museum (Bloomfield Hills, Michigan, 1998), and
- the Krannert Art Museum (Champaign, Illinois) 1997)

== Collections ==
Jacob's work resides in the collections of Centre Georges-Pompidou, Paris, France; Fonds Regional d'Art Contemporain (fr), Poitou-Charentre, Poitier, France; Fonds Regional d'Art Contemporain, Languedoc-Roussillon, Montpellier, France; Museum of Contemporary Art, San Diego, California; and the MacArthur Foundation, Chicago, Illinois.

== Awards ==
Jacob received the Creative Capital Visual Arts Award in the year 2000. In 2011 she received the Maud Morgan Prize from the Boston Museum of Fine Art. In the year 2014-15 she was a Fulbright Scholar at the Glasgow School of Art.
