= Ebenezer Teichelmann =

New Zealand doctor, photographer, explorer

Ebenezer Teichelmann FRCS
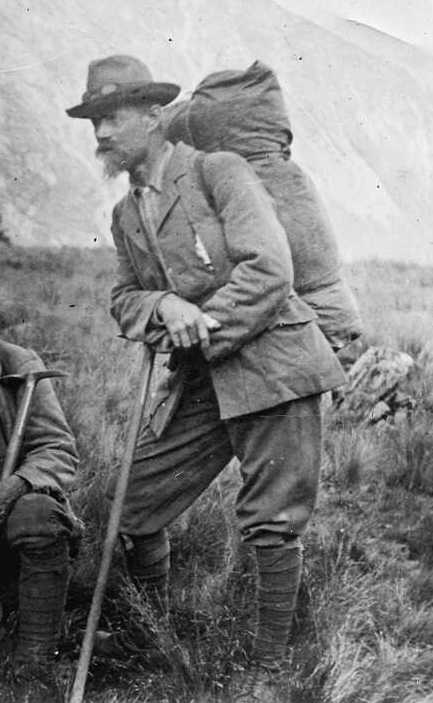
- Teichelmann in 1905 (aged around 46)
- Born: 23 March 1859; South Australia
- Died: 20 December 1938 (aged 79); Hokitika, New Zealand
- Resting place: Hokitika Cemetery
- Monuments: Teichelmann Memorial, Hokitika; Mt Teichelmann; Teichelmann Peak; Teichelmann Rock; Teichelmann Creek; Teichelmann's corner Teichelmann's Track; Ebenezer Peak
- Education: University of Adelaide
- Occupations: surgeon, mountaineer, explorer, conservationist, photographer
- Father: Christian Gottlieb Teichelmann

Ebenezer Teichelmann FRCS (23 March 1859 – 20 December 1938), known as 'the little Doctor' to his friends, was an Australian-born surgeon, mountaineer, explorer, conservationist and photographer in New Zealand. He was a survivor of the sinking of the SS Marquette in 1915. He achieved 26 first ascents of mountains and seven first ascents, or crossings, of passes, cols, or saddles, and is credited with reviving climbing in New Zealand when the sport was almost dead. A keen photographer, he used a full-plate glass camera, which was hauled up many mountains. His photographs were used in books and advertisements, and helped to achieve conservation status for West Coast reserves.

== Early life and education ==
Teichelmann was born on 23 March 1859 near Callington, South Australia, the ninth child of fifteen born to German Lutheran missionary Christian Teichelmann and his Scottish wife Margaret, née Nicholson. The Teichelmanns could only afford secondary education for one child, Ebenezer. The family worked a farm, also called Ebenezer, at Morphett Vale, outside Adelaide, finding the funds available to a missionary to be insufficient to support them.

Teichelmann was educated at Hahndorf College, and boarded there from 1869–1873, but when the family moved to the Yorke Peninsula in 1873 Teichelmann remained behind in Adelaide and had himself apprenticed to a pharmacist. Finishing his apprenticeship, he was able to work as a dispensing chemist to a doctor while studying medicine at the University of Adelaide.

In 1882, Teichelmann travelled to Queen's College, Birmingham and demonstrated physiology at Mason Science College. Teichelmann undertook postgraduate study in Dublin, specialising in surgery, and at St Bartholomew's Hospital in London. After this he served as assistant physician and resident pathologist at Birmingham General Hospital, assistant surgeon at Jaffray Hospital, and resident medical officer to the Birmingham Workhouse. During the ten years he spent in England and Ireland, Teichelmann also worked as private assistant to Lawson Tait, a gynaecologist who pioneered surgical treatment of ectopic pregnancy, in Birmingham and for two years had a private practice. He had also become a Fellow of the Royal College of Surgeons of England, a Licentiate of the Royal College of Surgeons in Ireland, and an Associate of the Mason Science College in Birmingham.

While in Birmingham, Teichelmann met Mary Bettney (c. 1863–1909), who had been matron at a Birmingham hospital. They were married in West Bromwich in the last quarter of 1891.

== Return to Adelaide ==
In 1892, the Teichelmanns travelled to Melbourne, with Teichelmann working as the ship's doctor on the Yarrawonga. On his return Teichelmann took up the post of health officer at Port Adelaide. Teichelmann worked for five years in Adelaide, during which he was a Surgeon Lieutenant and then Surgeon Captain for the South Australian military, and was locum tenens for Professor Edward Stirling, professor of physiology at Adelaide University, while he was on leave in England. The Adelaide hospital was in dispute with its staff for much of the 1890s (see Margaret Graham), and in 1896 there was a mass resignation of honorary and medical staff, although with staff continuing to care for their patients until replacements were appointed. When Teichelmann was offered a position as Senior Surgeon he declined, explaining later "I did not care to go back on my brother professionals. My one chance in Adelaide was gone and I decided to go away."

== Emigration to New Zealand ==
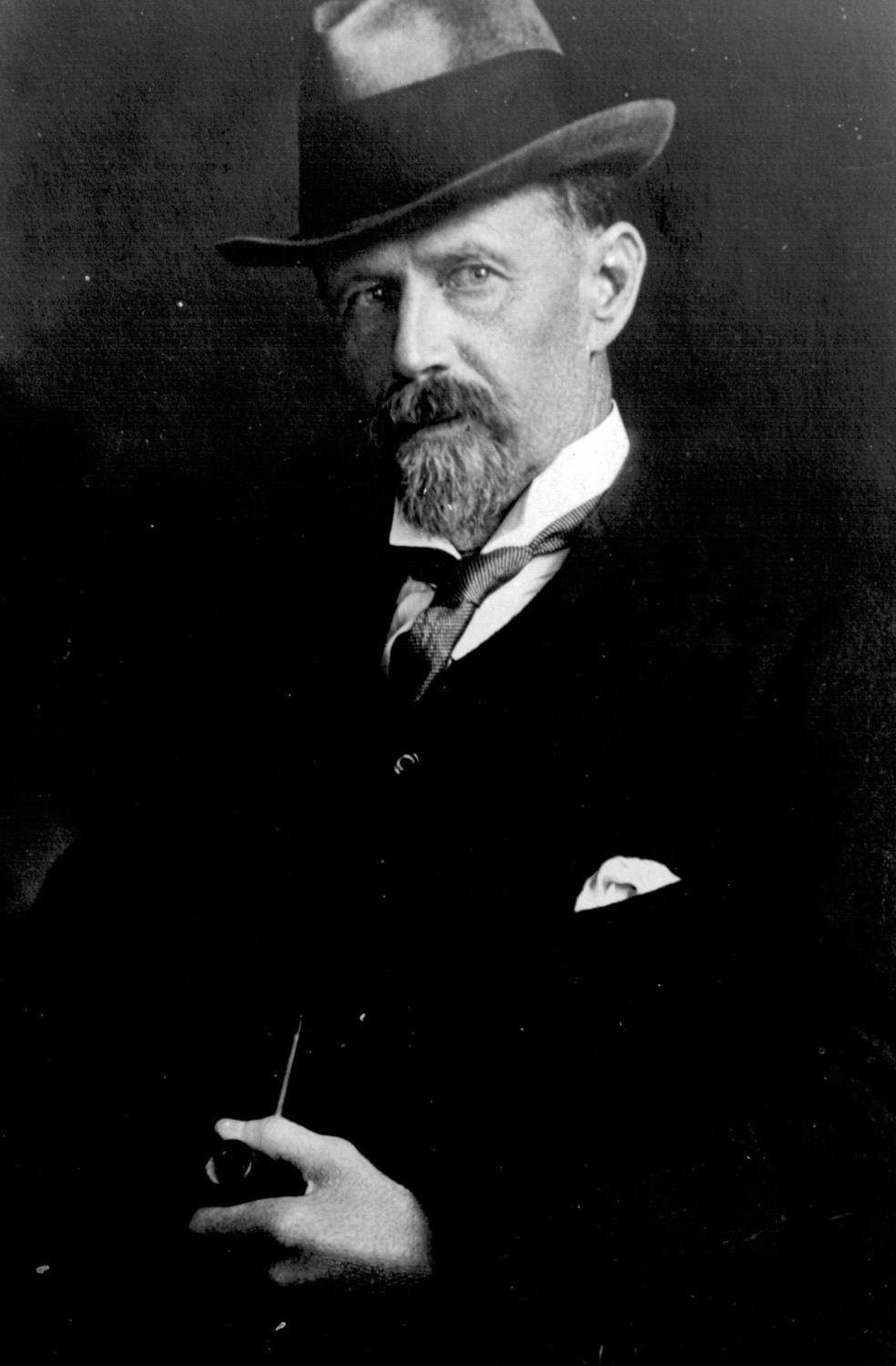
Ebenezer Teichelmann in his customary outfit and with his beloved pipe. Undated but before 1934.

Teichelmann successfully applied for the position of Surgical Superintendent of the Westland District Hospital, in Hokitika on the West Coast of the South Island of New Zealand. In 1897, the Teichelmanns arrived in Hokitika, where Teichelmann initially set up his private practice in a room at the Kellers Hotel, before commissioning a builder to construct a new residence and private surgery on 20 Hamilton Street. As the sole doctor to a population scattered over 380 kilometres of rugged coastline, Teichelmann was required to be an excellent surgeon and a good administrator. The Westland Hospital provided maternity, surgical, geriatric and medical services, using four wards capable of holding 50 patients. Teichelmann also operated private consulting rooms and a small nursing and convalescent hospital at his Hamilton Street residence, staffed by an onsite housekeeper and a nurse. He was ably assisted for many years both in his private practice and at the hospital by nurse Bess Hudson.

Teichelmann's responsibilities required him to travel at all hours of the day or night in what was a remote and rugged area, often with little more than a track to follow, and where few rivers were bridged. Accidents were commonplace, with mining, land clearing and tree felling being common activities in the area. The year Teichelmann arrived, he treated several people for smoke inhalation and burns after fire destroyed eight buildings on Revell Street, including the Golden Age Hotel, and the Hokitika Guardian and Evening Star newspaper offices and archives. The following year a fall of sand and soil buried miners in Craig's Freehold in South Hokitika, killing three men. On one occasion Teichelmann and Nurse Hudson manned a railway jigger for 10 kilometres (6.2 miles) at night to reach a patient in Ruatapu.

The Teichelmanns settled easily into small-town life. Mary Teichelmann became known as an emancipated woman and a trendsetter, and was the first woman in the town to smoke in public, play golf, and one of the first to drive a car. She also supported the hospital by raising more than £8 for an invalid chair, for which she received a public vote of thanks. In 1909, aged 46, Mary became ill and spent several days in bed. She died suddenly of a heart attack while her husband was at Blue Spur, and the local newspaper reported that a gloom was cast over the entire town at her unexpected death.

In 1912, Teichelmann requested a leave of absence from his post to update his medical skills, citing the isolation of his position, and New Zealand as a whole, as a motivating factor. He planned to spend seven or eight months observing doctors in major hospitals in Europe, before a holiday in the Swiss Alps. The township farewelled him on 22 March 1912, in a gathering at the Hotel Westland, with speeches and a rendition of La Marseillaise, and presented him with a gold watch and chain. Teichelmann travelled to Europe, spending time in Birmingham, Edinburgh, Vienna, Dresden, Leipzig and Paris, as well as period climbing in Zermatt, and attending the sixth International Gynecological and Obstetric Congress in Berlin. On his return to New Zealand in January 1913 he described the advances in motor transport in London, such that horses were rarely to be seen, and several visits to Hendon aerodrome, where he was impressed with England's progress in aviation, but also mentioned that prevalent strikes made things generally unsatisfactory.

== War service ==
With a German father and a Scottish mother, Teichelmann was in an unenviable position when war was declared on 4 August 1914. He was a Surgeon Major in the New Zealand Medical Corps with the 13th Canterbury Regiment since 1907, and he expected to serve but was not initially called up, possibly because of his German name or his age. Teichelmann wrote to the British War Office and to James Allen, the New Zealand Defence Minister, requesting to be allowed to do his duty, and was eventually called up to the Medical Corps on 25 August 1915, and assigned to the Sixth Reinforcements. He sailed in September 1915 and joined the No 1 Stationary Hospital in Port Said Egypt on 9 October 1915. Shortly after his arrival the hospital was instructed to move to another location. Teichelmann boarded the troopship SS Marquette in Alexandria along with other medical personnel from the hospital, including a contingent of 36 New Zealand nurses, and the Ammunition Column of the British 29th Division. Four days later, in the Gulf of Salonika, the Marquette was torpedoed and sank within seven minutes. One hundred and seventy people died, some in the explosion, some when lifeboats were incorrectly launched, and some by drowning or exhaustion. Teichelmann spent several hours in the water but was eventually rescued.

The Stationary Hospital was reestablished using marquees in Lembet Camp in Greece, where they received patients from the front lines in Doiran and Gallipoli. Alongside the more usual problems of typhoid, para-typhoid, and dysentery, strong winds, sleet and snow at the end of November 1915 caused severe frostbite injuries which Teichelmann, with his mountaineering experience, was well-qualified to treat. In March 1916, the Stationary Hospital was relocated back to Port Said, and then in July of that year Teichelmann was attached to the 2nd General Hospital based in Le Havre, France.

It was around this time that the Anti-German League in New Zealand was stirring up sentiment against people with German heritage and German-sounding names. MP for Grey Lynn, John Payne, tabled a list of 50 names of "German suspects" in Parliament, including that of Teichelmann, prompting a strong response from Hokitika Mayor George Perry, who said "Dr Teichelmann has been for twenty years a citizen of this town and is widely known and respected. He is a British Subject, and the Council of which he was a member deeply resents the action of the member for Grey Lynn in bringing Dr Teichelmann's name before the House in the list of German suspects and regards his action as an insufferable insult to the town and district."

Teichelmann served at the Hornchurch Convalescent Hospital and the Codford Depot on Salisbury Plain, before returning to New Zealand as surgeon aboard the hospital ship SS Maheno, arriving in December 1916. Shortly after his return, in January 1917, a close friend Dr Herbert Macandrew died. Macandrew was honorary curator of the Hokitika Museum, and had been active in the Westland Institute with Teichelmann. Macandrew had been medical officer at the Seaview Asylum and Teichelmann took over this role from 1916 to 1921.

In 1918, the influenza epidemic came to Hokitika. News from Europe prepared people in New Zealand for what to expect. The first cases in Hokitika were reported on 13 November, and were followed the next day by a public meeting calling for volunteers to assist with dealing with the effects. Inhalation chambers were set up in the library and a drill shed, and on 15 November, when Westland Hospital was already crowded with patients, Teichelmann opened a further twenty beds at the Victoria School. Further beds were placed in St Mary's Club Rooms on 19 November, by which time 13 people had already died. A medical student sent from Dunedin to assist Teichelmann became ill himself, as did many of the nursing staff, four of whom died. In less than three weeks, influenza killed 27 people in Hokitika.

== Exploring and mountaineering ==
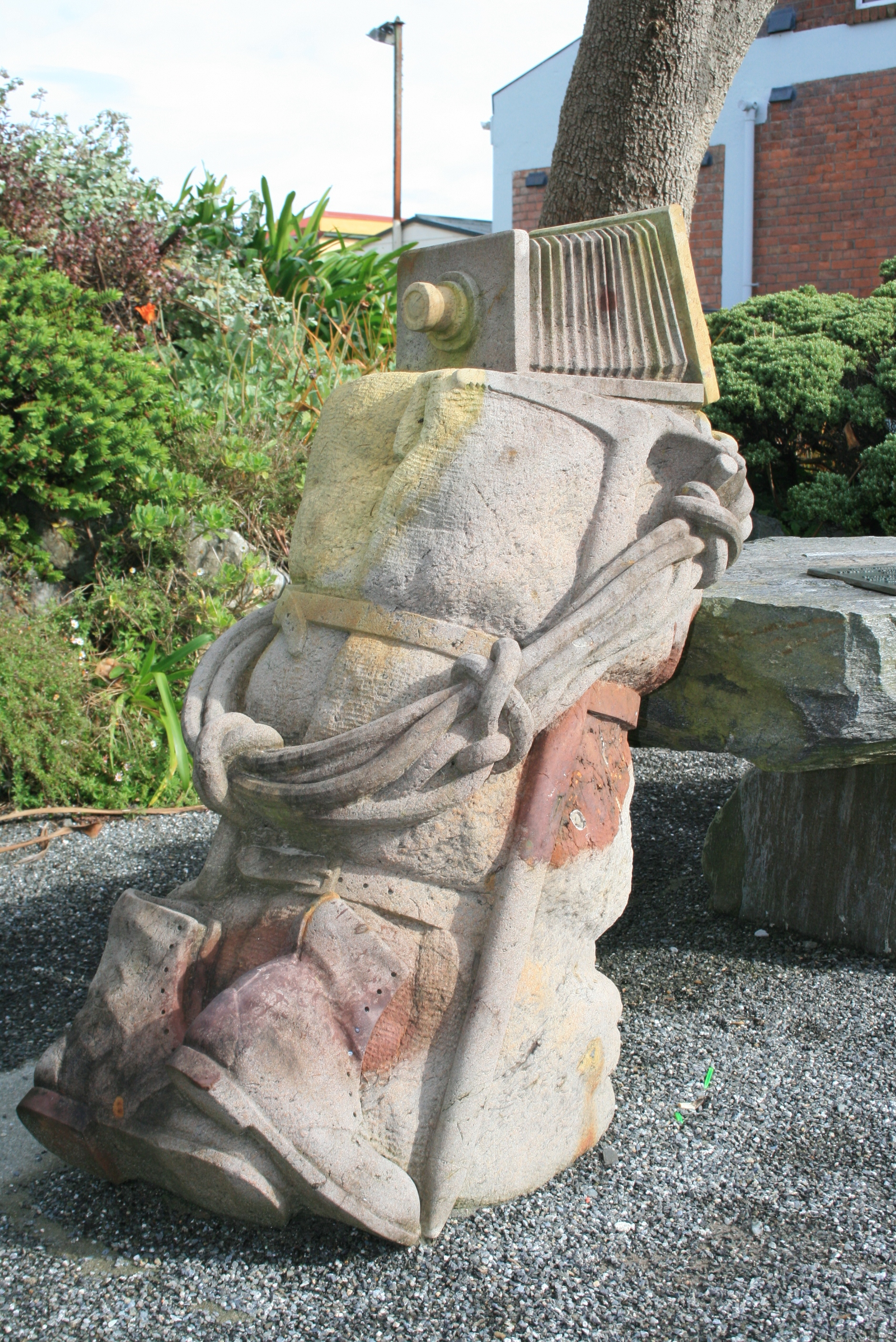
Memorial sculpture and stone bench outside Teichelmann's house in Hokitika, depicting his pack, ropes, boots and camera.

Between 1899 and 1924, Teichelmann recorded 26 first ascents of mountains and seven first ascents, or crossings, of passes, cols, or saddles. He is credited with keeping climbing in New Zealand going during a period when the New Zealand Alpine Club was in abeyance. His mountaineering career began with an interest in gold-mining, a significant industry in Hokitika at the time. In 1899, Teichelmann went into partnership with brothers Charles and Harold Stoner, and Mr Lee, backing brothers Alec and Peter Graham look for gold in the Callery area. It was the connection made through his business interest that led Teichelmann to travel with Arthur Woodham, Charlie Stoner and Peter Graham into the upper Callery River, with Teichelmann keen to document their trip through photography. Peter Graham carried the doctor's full-plate camera up the Burster Range to explore the Burston and Spencer Glaciers over seven days. Although the expedition found no gold, the 40-year old Teichelmann was smitten with the mountains, and was to spend the next 25 years exploring the mountains of South Westland. Teichelmann benefited from advice from surveyors and explorers George John Roberts (1848–1910) and Charlie Douglas, who he visited often and was responsible for the medical care of in the last years of their lives.

Teichelmann was known as "the little Doctor", and described as "a small man, without an ounce of superfluous flesh" but with "amazing" physical powers. When Newton, Alec Graham and Teichelmann made the first ascent of Douglas Peak (3077m) in 1907, they took Teichelmann's full-plate camera and Newton's Sanderson, carrying more than 25 kilograms (55 lb) of camera equipment between them. Newton reports that Teichelmann's companions loathed his heavy camera equipment when it was time to 'swag' in or out of a climb, but that they were always keen to see the photographs that resulted. Teichelmann was known to shelter his camera before himself if there was not space for both. As a surgeon, Teichelmann was always worried about damaging his hands, and before climbing on rock would tape his hands to limit abrasions and cuts that might affect his ability to operate.

Teichelmann regularly climbed with Canon Henry E Newton (1873–1961) and Alex Graham. Teichelmann's biographer Bob McKerrow regarded them as the "greatest climbing trio in the history of New Zealand mountaineering". Newton had arrived on the West Coast in 1901, with a letter of introduction to Teichelmann from Bishop Julius, to take up the position of Vicar of Ross and South Westland. He was a keen mountaineer, having climbed in the Lake District and spent five seasons in the European Alps. Newton returned to England in 1907, although he visited New Zealand again in 1934, bringing his car with him, and met up with his old climbing partner. Other companions included W. Batson, a guesthouse owner from Waiho; Jack Clarke, Scottish climber R. S. Low, the Reverend Kemp, D. Nolan, and Dr Vollman, an archaeologist from Peru.

Teichelmann's list of firsts includes first ascents of Craig Peak, Mounts Gaskill, Purity, McIntosh, Ferguson and Vickers, Chancellor Dome, Engineer Col, Pioneer Pass, La Perouse, Mount Halcombe, Glacier Peak, Mount Douglas, Mount Torres, Mounts Moltke, Roon, Anderegg, Bismark, Glacier Dome (Waiatoto), Mounts Green, Walter, Chudleigh (low and middle peaks), Mount Stoddart, Snowy Peak, Mount Tyndall, Malcolm Peak, and Mount Spencer. His was the first traverse of the Victoria range, and the first crossings of Baker Saddle and Harper Saddle. In 1905 Teichelmann, Jack Clarke, Peter Graham, R. S. Low and Newton made the third ascent of Aoraki/Mount Cook, via the Zurbriggen route.

In 1903, Teichelmann was elected member of the London Alpine Society. He was elected President of the New Zealand Alpine Club in 1936, and was awarded Life Membership in 1937.

== Photography ==
It is not clear where Teichelmann learned photography, but by the time of his arrival in Hokitika he had already acquired the necessary knowledge and equipment. Most of his images were taken with 5 x 4 film and a whole-plate camera, which despite the weight was carried to the top of many mountains. The negatives would often be developed in Alec Graham's bathroom in Waiho, although Teichelmann would use the services of professional Hokitika-based photographer Benno Thiem (1879–1934) to print the negatives and mount them on glass lantern-slides.

Teichelmann built up an extensive collection of photographs of New Zealand scenery, and made a point of taking as near complete panoramic views as possible, which was of assistance to mappers of the area. His photographs were used in books, government reports, tourism brochures and advertisements, and in a farewell speech in 1926 Mr W J Jefferies, the Chairman of the Westland County Council, recognised this publicly, saying "The Doctor's work in booklets and pamphlets has gone all over the world and he has not spared himself in his efforts to extol the beauties and attractions of Westland."

After his last climb with Newton and Graham, in 1907, Teichelmann met Alfred A. Longden at the Hermitage. Longden was the Director of Fine Arts for the British Council, and had put together the display of British Art at the International Exhibition held in Hagley Park, Christchurch, but he was also a mountaineer. Teichelmann spent time with Longden in Mount Cook before leaving for Christchurch to see the exhibition. He had many photographs exhibited of New Zealand scenery and was keen to see the display. Will Kennedy, President of the New Zealand Alpine Club, saw Teichelmann's images of Westland scenery and later said "The outstanding beauty and excellence of these photographs attracted my attention so tremendously that I longed to know the man responsible for them." The two met at the exhibition and became close friends, although when Kennedy catalogued Teichelmann's photographs for him, Teichelmann enjoyed telling everyone that he could no longer find anything.

Australian climber Freda du Faur first saw photographs of the Southern Alps at the Christchurch exhibition. Teichelmann later gave her permission to use several of his photographs in her 1915 autobiography The Conquest of Mount Cook and other climbs.

At the 1926 New Zealand and South Seas International Exhibition, negotiations for a combined display about Westland and the West Coast at the Dunedin exhibition had fallen through. Teichelmann had a collection of glass lantern slides that he was able to use to lecture about the Westland scenery, and left them behind for Tourist Department officials to show, with newspapers appreciating him as an unofficial ambassador for the region.

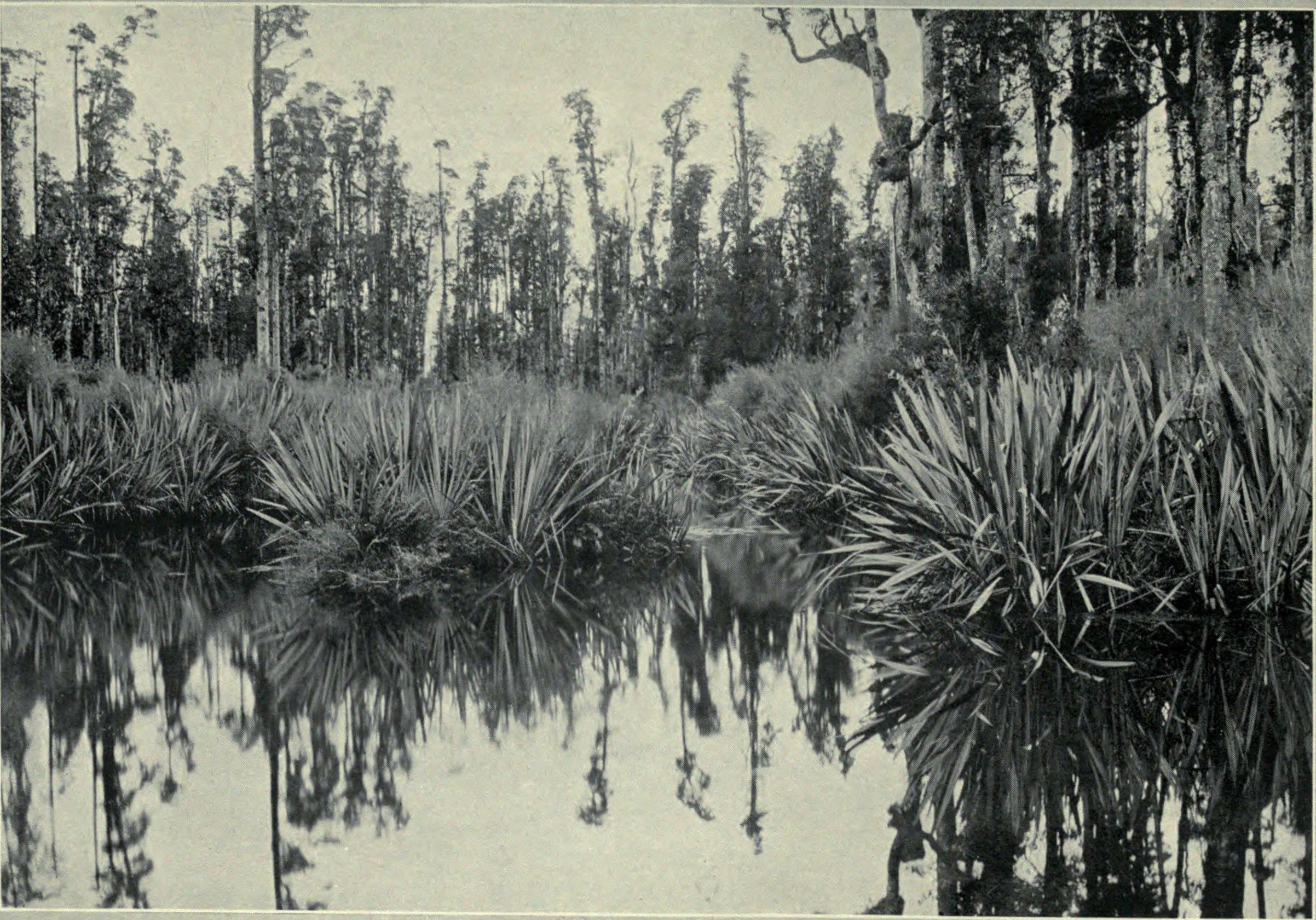
Mahinapua Creek, Westland, 1915

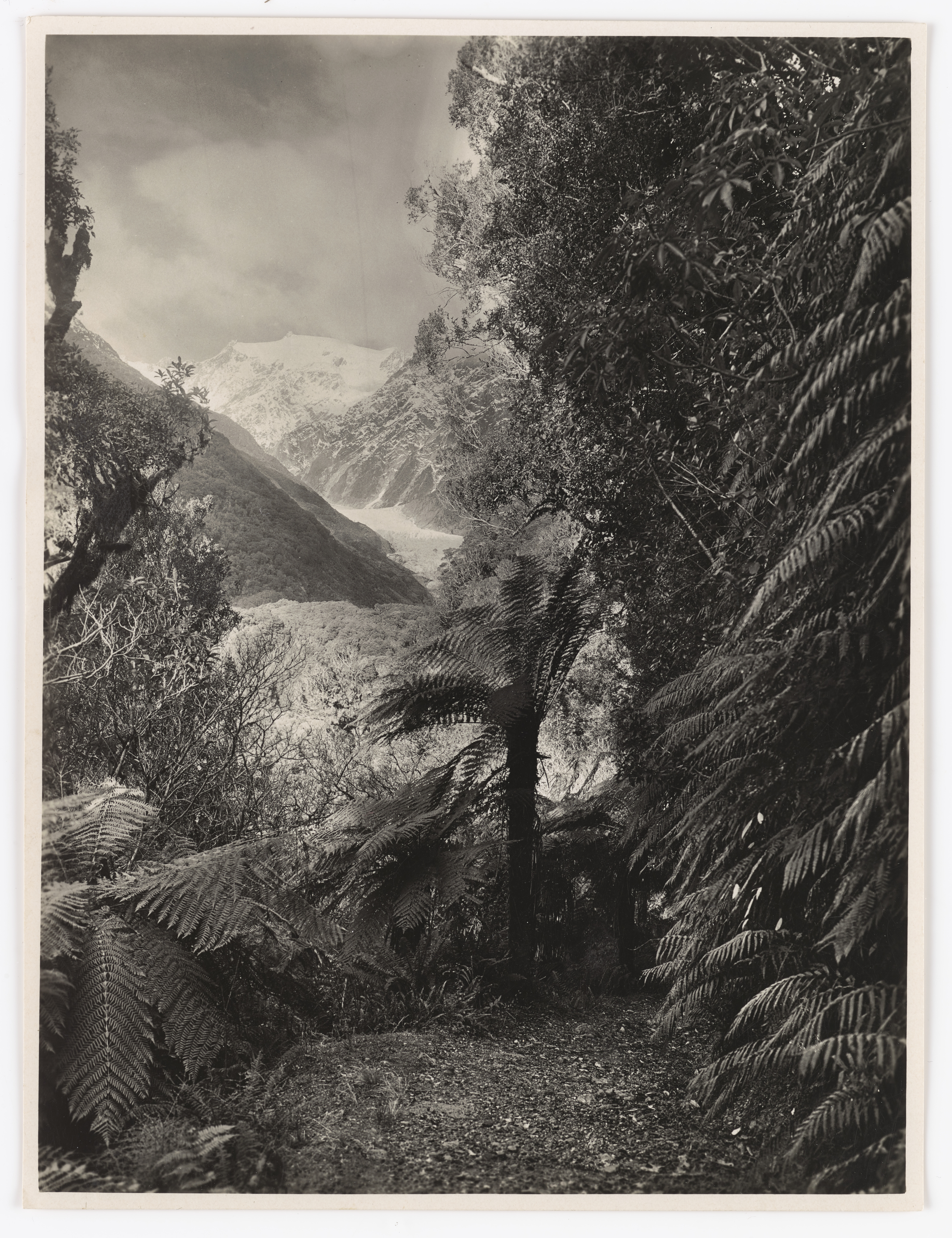
On the track to Franz Josef Glacier

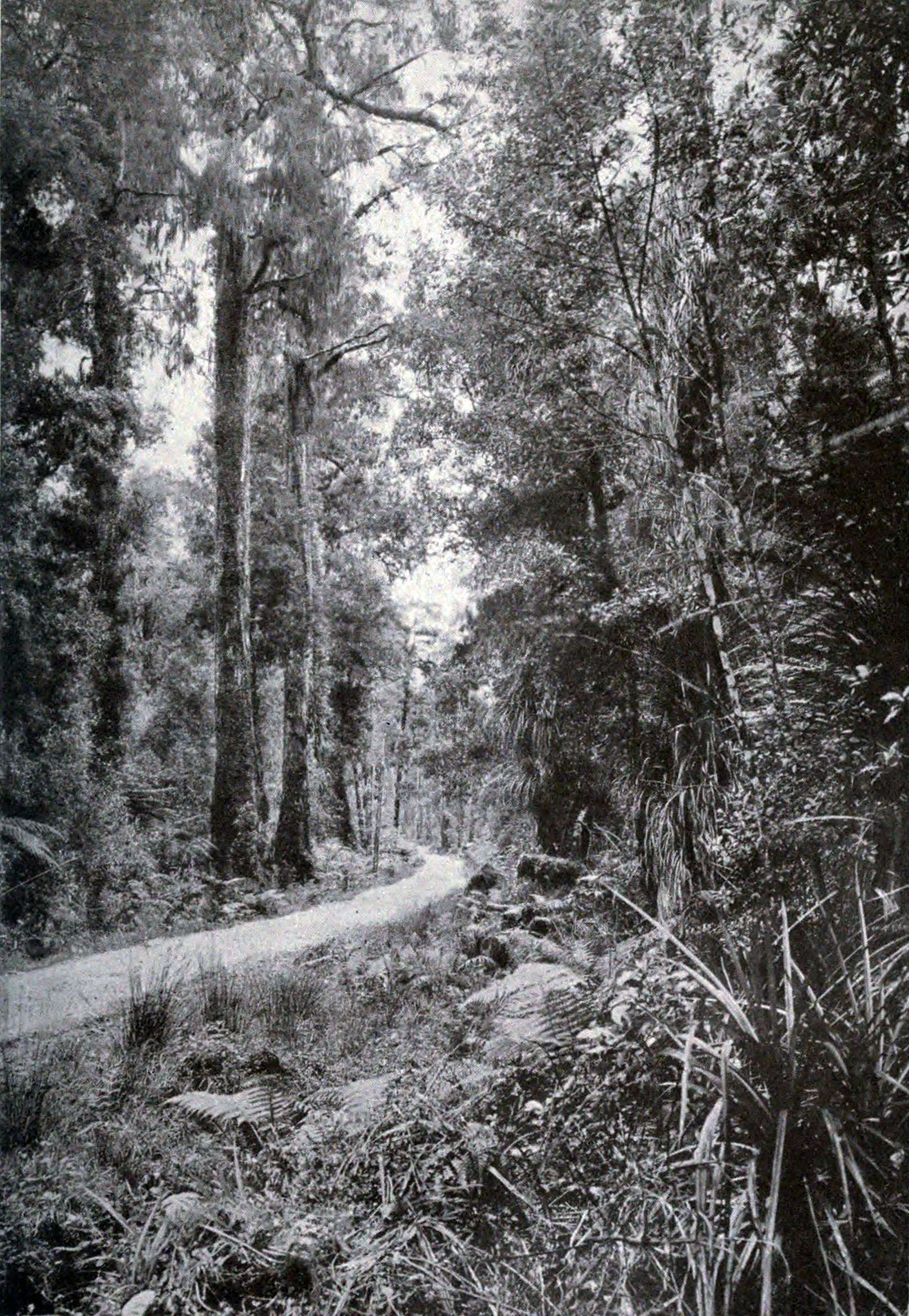
A bush road in South Westland, c1915

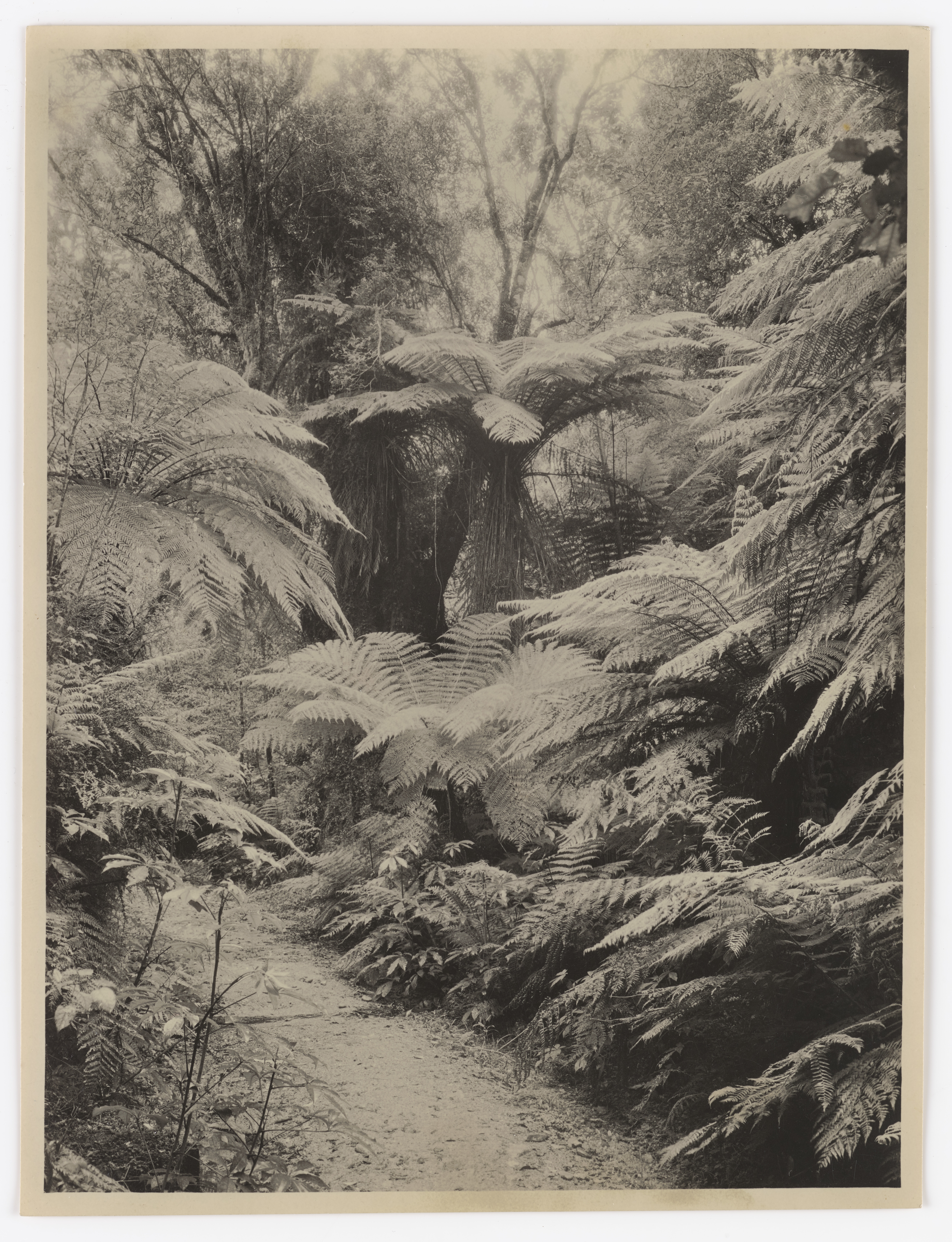
Track through the forest

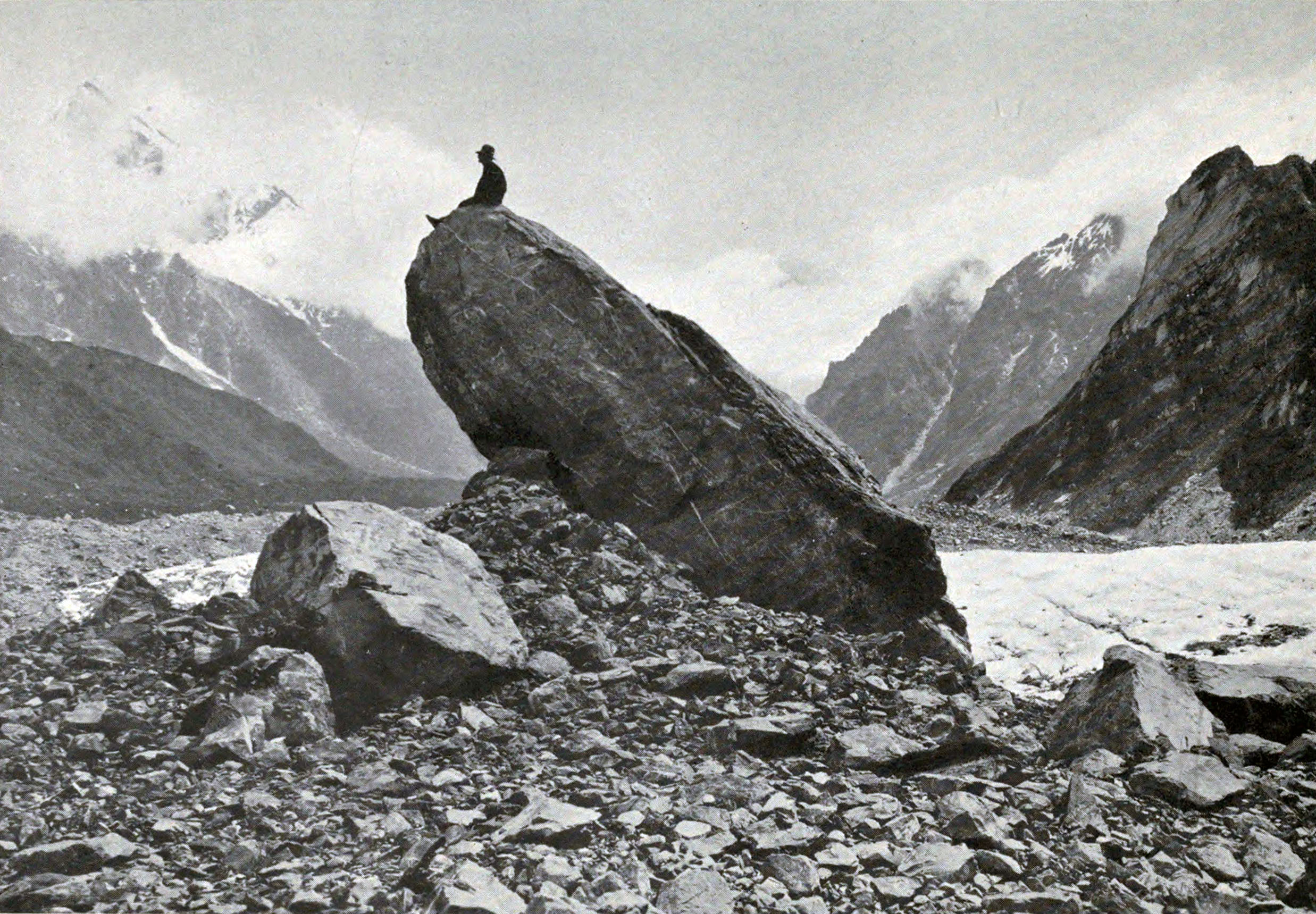
Looking down La Perouse glacier

== Conservation ==
Teichelmann's photographs had heightened public awareness of the scenery in Westland, and were instrumental in achieving scenic reserve status for Lake Kaniere in 1911 (where Teichelmann had a holiday cottage at Hans Bay), Punakaiki, Arthur's Pass, and the four Glacial Scenic Reserves of the Westland Tai Poutini National Park. Teichelmann was interested in botany, and struck up a friendship with botanist Leonard Cockayne. In 1915 they wrote a report on indigenous vegetation on the Port Hills, Christchurch, which opened the possibility of scenic reserves established only for their botanical value. The railway had brought large numbers of people to Arthur's Pass, and Cockayne led a campaign to protect the area. Arthur's Pass National Park was formed in 1929, and Teichelmann was a member of the first control board for the park. It was this experience on the Arthur's Pass board that probably led Teichelmann to be the driving force behind the establishment of a control board for the Lake Kaniere Scenic Reserve, which was established in 1934. The board cleared blackberry, appointed honorary rangers, and advocated for control of possums, weasels, stoats and rats due to their negative effects on native birds.

In 1930, Teichelmann and Cockayne again co-authored a report, this time on the glacial scenic reserves of Westland, as part of a Department of Lands and Survey scenery preservation report. The report details the plant life of the area, but also lists the birds to be seen, and describes "easy excursions".

== Death and legacy ==
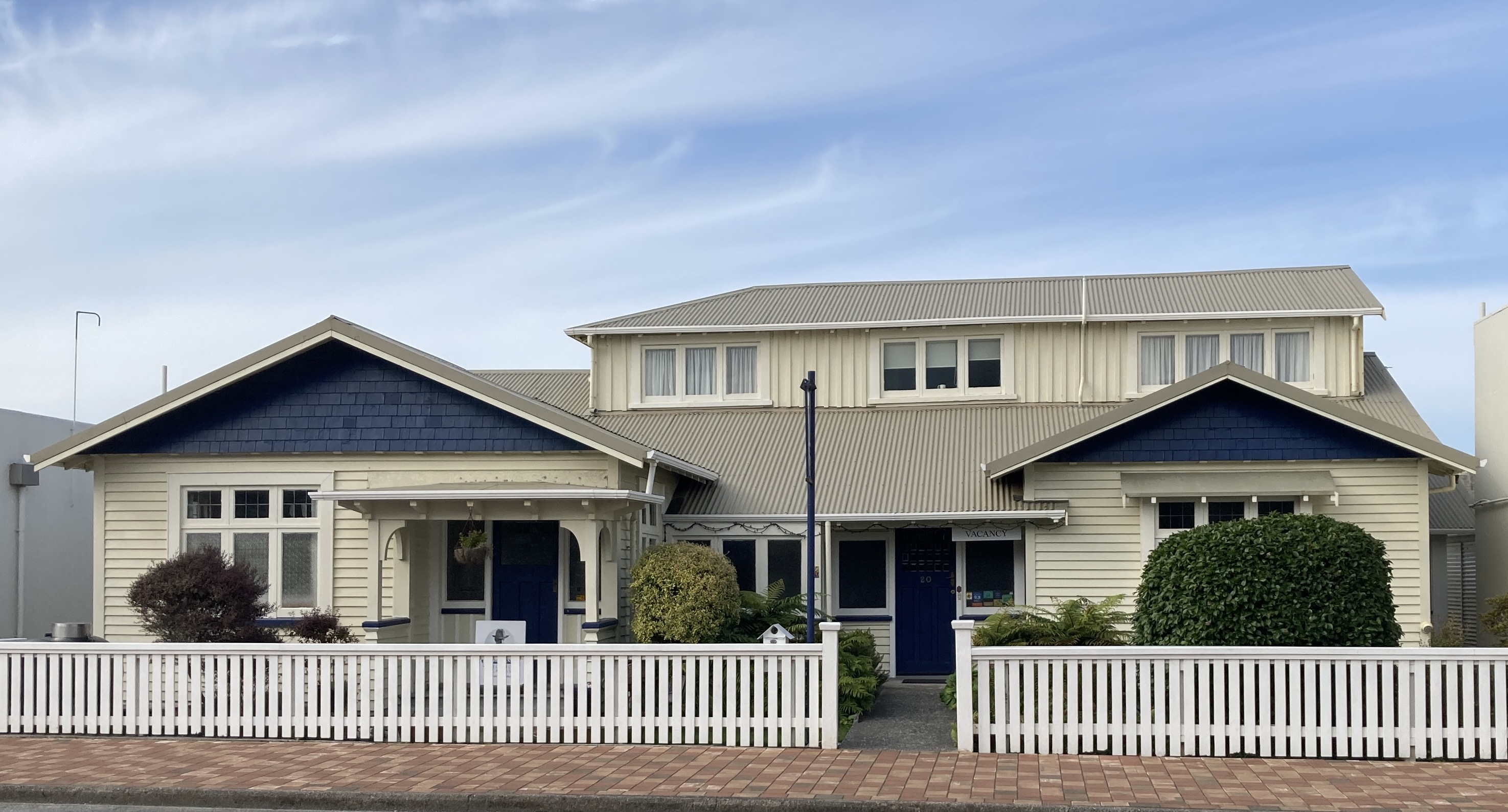
Teichelmann's residence and surgery at 20 Hamilton Street, Hokitika. The upper storey was added in the 1930s, and since 1995 it has been "Teichelmann's Bed and Breakfast"

When Newton returned to Hokitika to stay with Teichelmann in 1934, he found him suffering from "an obscure trouble in the jaw", but otherwise he appeared to have aged little and was as interested in alpine matters as he had always been. He wrote to Newton on 3 December in 1938, expressing his intention to visit England the following summer, but died on 20 December 1938 in Hokitika, aged 79. Teichelmann is buried with his wife, Mary in Hokitika Cemetery.

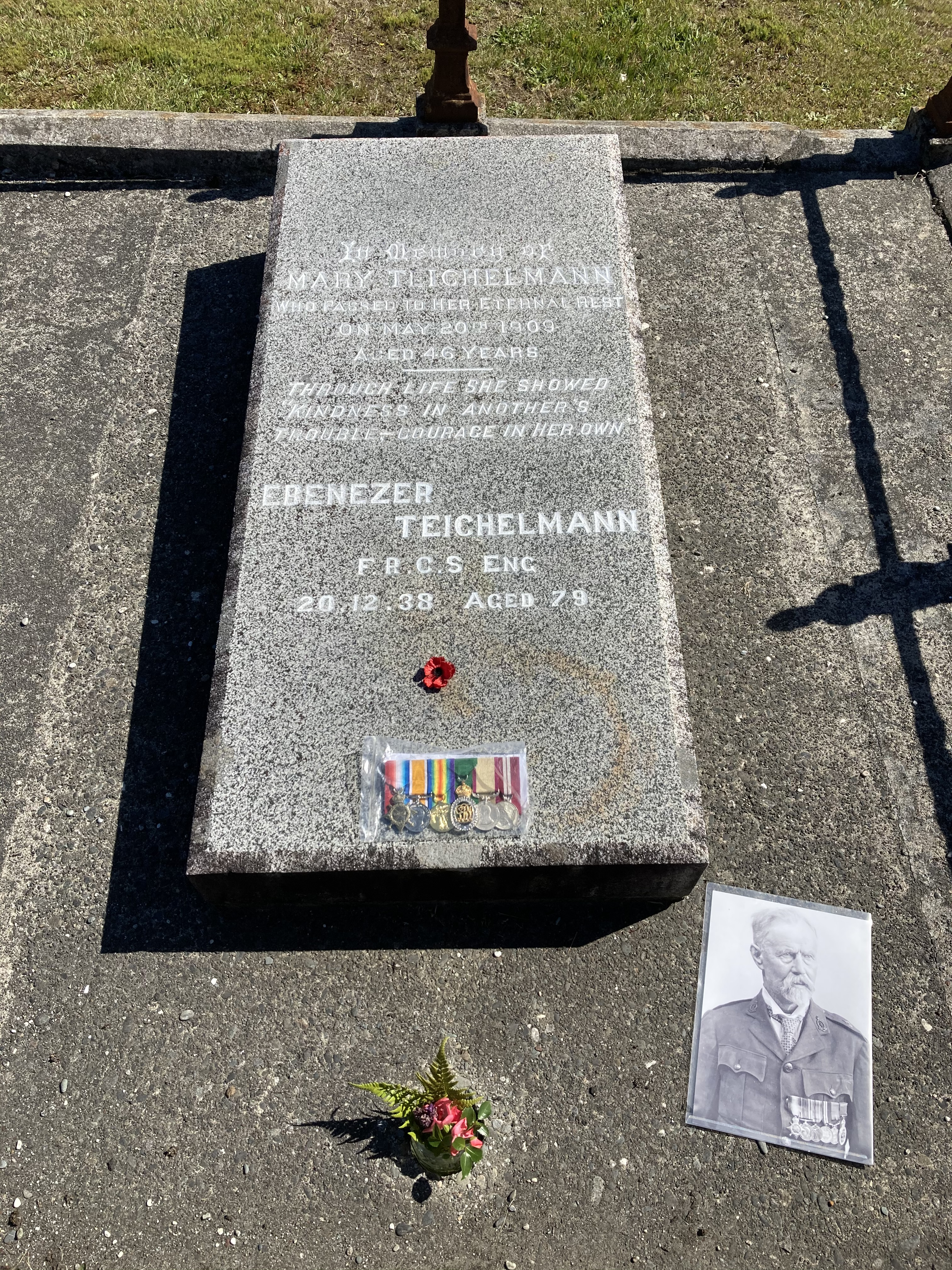
Teichelmann gravestone in Hokitika Cemetery

Around 1920 Teichelmann moved to a new house on the corner of Hampden and Jollie Streets, but continued to consult at his Hamilton Street rooms. The house and surgery remained as a doctor's practice after his death, and after WWII housed the clinic of dentist Arnold Perry. From 1960 it was a private residence, and in 1971 became a bed and breakfast known as the Central Guest House, before being renamed Teichelmann's Bed and Breakfast in 1995. In 2000 a memorial stone bench and sculpture were erected opposite the house, beside the Carnegie Building that Teichelmann helped secure the funds for. The owner of the house, Mr Brian Ward, initiated a project to restore Teichelmann's grave. Permission was required from the family, so Ward tracked down a grand-nephew of Teichelmann's in Victoria, John Tudor, who visited the grave in 2007 and donated $250 towards the restoration project.

Mount Teichelmann, Teichelmann Peak, Teichelmann Rock, Teichelmann Creek, Teichelmann's Corner, Teichelmann's Track, and Ebenezer Peak are all named after Teichelmann.

A collection of more than 600 of Teichelmann's photographs and negatives, some of which have been digitised, are held in the MacMillan Brown Collection of the University of Canterbury.

A biography of Teichelmann was published in 2007. The foreword was written by Sir Edmund Hillary, who said

"As a young climber I came to respect the climbs and exploration done by Dr. Ebenezer Teichelmann, mainly from the West Coast of New Zealand, up those long and difficult valleys such as the Cook River Valley, and his many first ascent were remarkable in that day and age of hobnail boots and long handled ice axes. His third ascent of Mt. Cook in 1905 was a wonderful achievement."

The First Crossings television series included an episode recreating Teichelmann's crossing of the 'fearsome' Cook River Gorge in 1905. The episode aired on TV One on 6 August 2013.

== Publications ==
- E. Teichelmann (December 1891). "Birmingham Workhouse Infirmary: A case of peritonitis following parturition; Removal of ruptured pyo-salpinx; Recovery". The Lancet. 138 (3562): 1276–1277. doi:10.1016/s0140-6736(01)88536-6. ISSN 0140-6736. Wikidata Q100715231.
- E. Teichelmann, F.R.C.S. Eng., of Port Adelaide (June 1892). "Notes of case of gonorrhoeal salpingitis". The Australasian Medical Gazette. 11: 259. Wikidata Q105497751.
- Ebenezer Teichelmann (1895). "Notes of a case of (?) ectopic gestation". Intercolonial Quarterly Journal of Medicine and Surgery. 2: 151. Wikidata Q105497849.
- Dr. E. Teichelmann, A.C. (December 1923). "The Relation of the Rakaia and Rangitata on the East to the Wanganui and Wataroa on the West". New Zealand Alpine Journal. 3 (13): 175–190. Wikidata Q105573284.
- Dr. E. Teichelmann, A.C. (December 1922). "The Pioneer Pass". New Zealand Alpine Journal. 4 (12): 130–140. Wikidata Q105525881.
- Dr. L. Cockayne, C.M.G., F.R.S.; Dr. E. Teichelmann (1930), The Glacial scenic reserves of Westland, Wellington: John Mackay, Wikidata Q105575762
