= Herbert Macandrew =

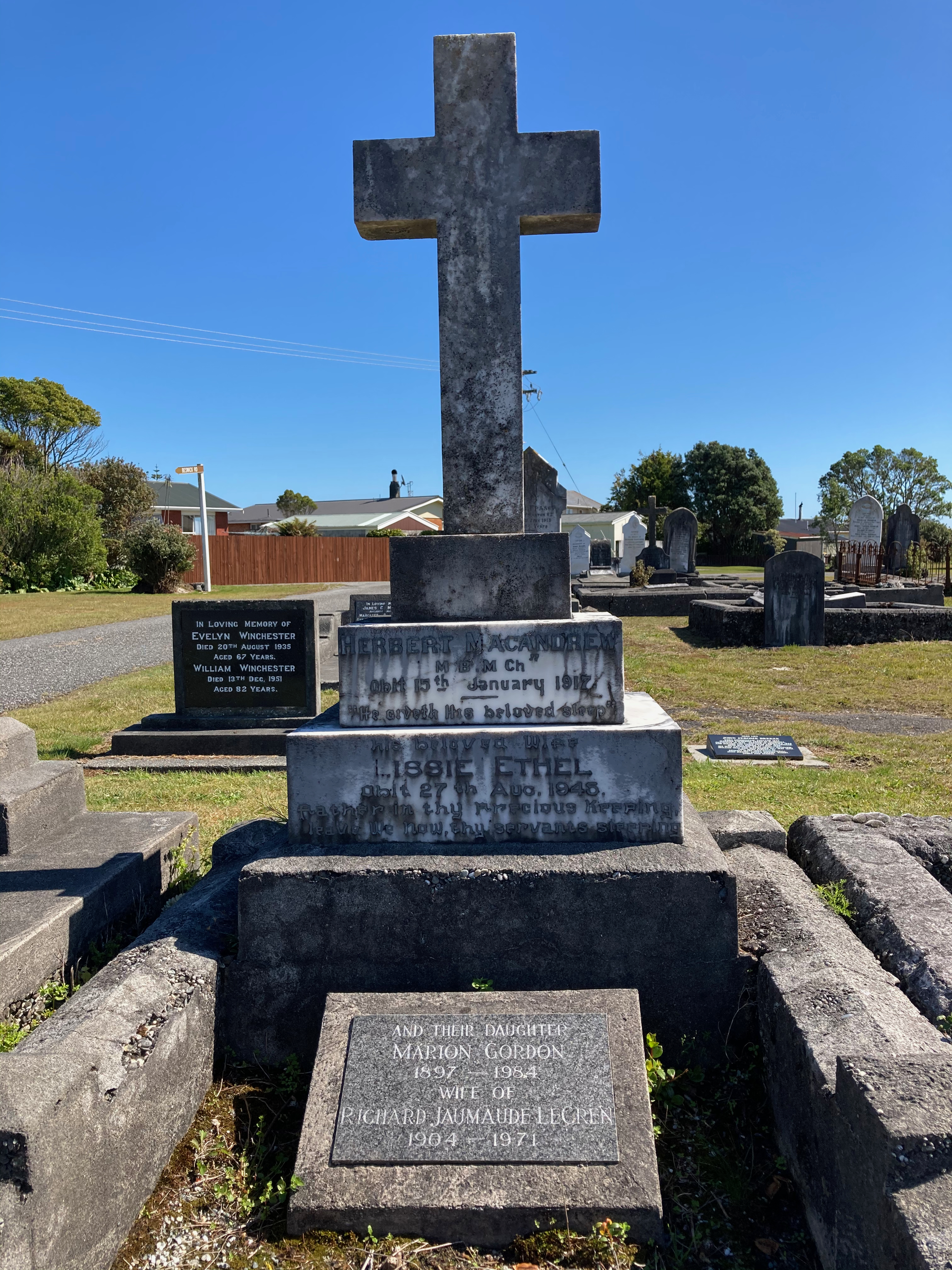
Grave of Herbert Macandrew, his wife Lissie Ethel (d. 1945) and their daughter Marion Gordon (1897–1984), Hokitika Cemetery

Herbert Macandrew (c. 1858 – 15 January 1917) was a New Zealand medical doctor and medical officer of the Seaview Asylum in Hokitika on the West Coast of the South Island.

Macandrew's father was the politician James Macandrew and he was one of four brothers and four sisters.

He was born in Dunedin and attended Otago Boys High School. He studied medicine at the University of Edinburgh; after graduating in 1883 he worked at an asylum in Shrewsbury. He was assistant medical officer at Seacliff Asylum and from 1887 was medical officer at Seaview Asylum in Hokitika for 28 years.

He and his wife had one son and two daughters.

Macandrew died of cancer on 15 January 1917 aged 57 in Hokitika. He is buried in the Hokitika Cemetery.
