= Seaview Asylum =

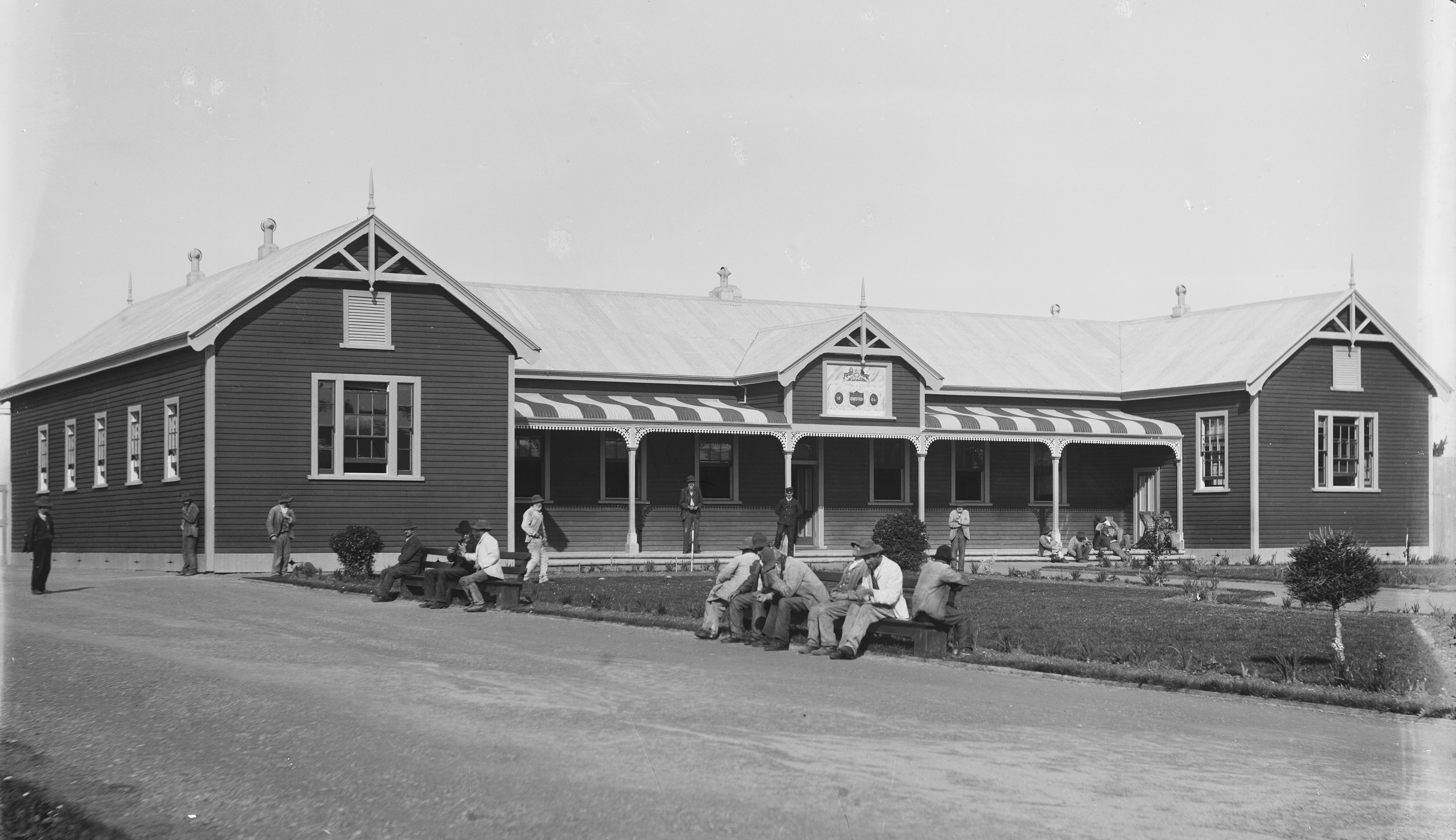
- Seaview Asylum, c. 1904

Geography
- Location: North of Hokitika, West Coast Region, South Island, New Zealand
- Coordinates: 42.706336°S 170.974857°E (approximate)

Organisation
- Type: Specialist

Services
- Beds: 549 at peak
- Speciality: Psychiatric hospital

History
- Former names: Seaview Lunatic Asylum, Seaview Psychiatric Hospital, Hokitika Lunatic Asylum
- Opened: 1872
- Closed: 2009

Links
- Lists: Hospitals in New Zealand

The Seaview Asylum (also known as Seaview Hospital) was a psychiatric hospital located to the north of Hokitika, in the West Coast Region of New Zealand's South Island, adjacent to the former Westland Hospital. Open from 1872 to 2002, Seaview trained psychiatric nurses and was once the town's biggest employer. One of the remaining hospital buildings burnt down in 2025.

== History ==
In the 1860s lunatics in the rapidly growing town of Hokitika were taken to the gaol which quickly outgrew its buildings; a new gaol was built north of the town at Seaview Terrace. The first hospital in Hokitika (which later became Westland Hospital) was built to the south of the town, at South Spit, in 1865 and was able to accommodate a few psychiatric patients but after 1867 the majority of them were sent to Sunnyside Hospital in Christchurch. In 1869 when the option to send patients to Sunnyside was no longer available patients were again kept in the gaol until the Seaview Asylum was opened in 1872. It was located to the north of the town adjacent to the Hokitika cemetery. The hospital was built by the provincial government.

Hugh and Winifred Gribben were the superintendent and matron of Seaview from 1872 to 1904. Gribben encouraged recreation programmes and participation by the community in entertaining patients. In the early years patients undertook domestic and outdoor work including trades. Gribben was notable for not using restraint in patient care. He also built the Cottage in 1879 which was the forerunner of the villa system adopted by other mental hospitals. However in the 1880s–1890s the hospital became much more custodial.

John Downey was promoted to Superintendent in 1904, and his wife served as matron. In 1905 the hospital was staffed by the superintendent, matron, male and female attendants, and a labourer. In 1904 Dr Duncan MacGregor, Inspector-General of Hospitals and Asylums, authorised the villa hospital pattern of development at Seaview Hospital.

Dr Herbert Macandrew was appointed medical officer in 1887, a position he held for 28 years. From 1916 Dr Teichelmann was medical officer until the appointment of Dr H.M. Buchanan as the first medical superintendent in 1921 moving the hospital from lay to medical control.

By 1921 when Buchanan took charge the buildings were in a state of disrepair. His lobbying resulted in a furore in parliament and money was allocated to rebuild the hospital. A central services block, admission and administration blocks were built along with villas to house the patients. The new buildings, Buchanan's changes in the way the hospital was run and the use of qualified general and psychiatric staff resulted in better therapeutic and custodial care of patients. Buchanan also improved the relationship with the nearby Westland Hospital and had a road built between the two institutions.

During the 1920s and 1930s around half or more of Seaview's patients were transfers from other mental hospitals around the country. The construction of villas increased to accommodate the intakes and a custodial approach was taken in patient care.

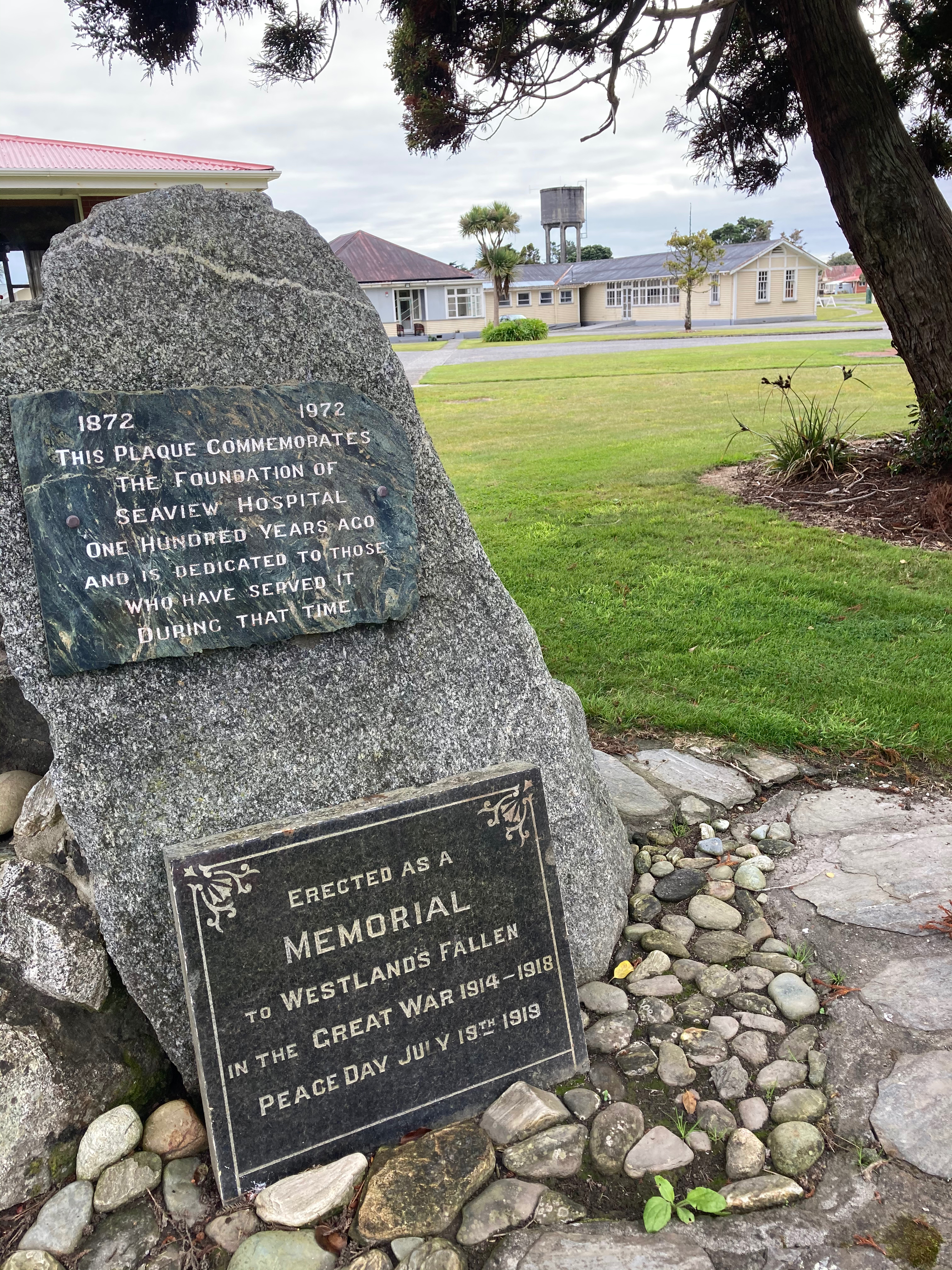
Commemorative plaques to the Seaview Asylum's centennial in 1972 and to those lost in World War 1 with old asylum buildings in the background. March 2021

During and after the war there was a shortage of staff and patients undertook the work needed to maintain the hospital's services. Occupational therapy for patients and building renovations were curtailed because of shortage of staff. In 1946 there were 526 patients of which 304 were working around the hospital in wards, the farm, gardens, workshops and kitchen. Patients were not remunerated for their work until 1947. During the 1950s patient care became more curative as convulsive and drug therapies were introduced but full adoption of these new procedures was hindered by staff shortages and finances. However modernisation of the wards did continue and patients lived in open wards.

In the 1950s and 1960s the farm and gardens ceased operations due to their becoming uneconomic. Part of the hospital land had been taken over for the airport in 1947.

The Nurses' Home was built in 1939–1940 to assist in the recruitment and retention of staff. Before that nurses had lived in the wards or other buildings. Nursing training began at Seaview in the 1930s. It was estimated that about 500 nurses had graduated from the Seaview School of Psychiatric Nursing when it closed in 1992. A reunion of nurses was held in 1992.

The Chapel of the Holy Spirit was opened in 1963 and the hospital's community centre in 1967.

In 1955, Seaview had peaked with 549 patients. By 1996, there were 100, and when the facility closed in 2009, it was down to 22. The hospital cared for patients with intellectual disabilities, psychiatric and psychogeriatric conditions and the frail elderly.

Three units were closed in the 1990s; in 2002, the hospital board sold the asylum to a property developer though some buildings were leased back. Since the facility has been closed it has been used on numerous occasions by the New Zealand Defence Force to stage urban warfare, search and rescue and public disorder exercises.

== Buildings ==
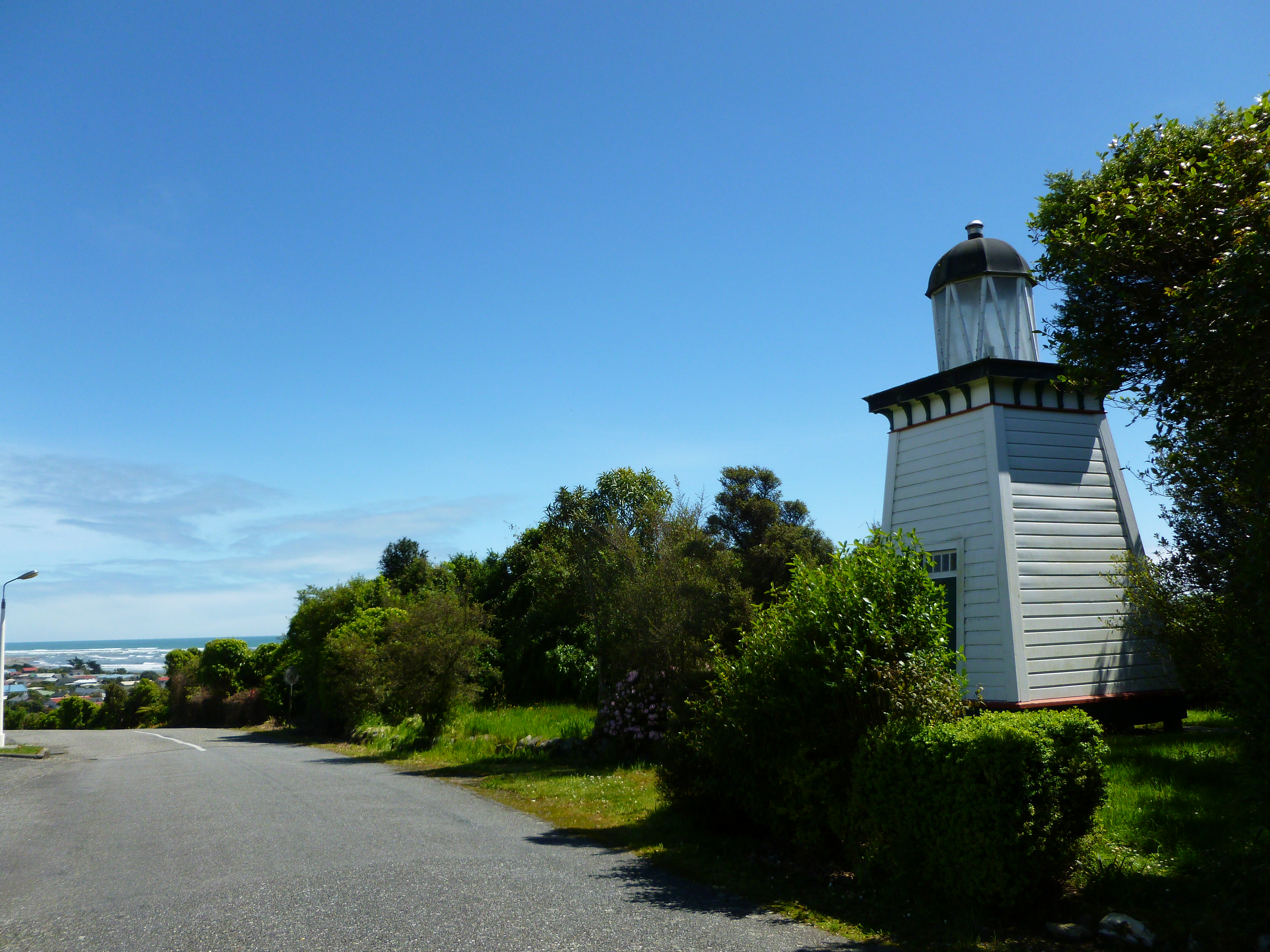
The lighthouse and view of Hokitika township from Seaview Hill

Located on a government reserve, the land was terraced and consisted of approximately 150 acres (61 ha). The major buildings included a chapel, dormitories, single rooms, dining rooms, and a padded cell. The Seaview Lighthouse, a Category II registered Historic Place erected in 1879, was once scheduled for demolition, but it found new leases of life as an observation tower for hospital and as a coast watch station during World War Il. The lighthouse is also known as the Hokitika Lighthouse was restored in 2002 by Heritage Hokitika.

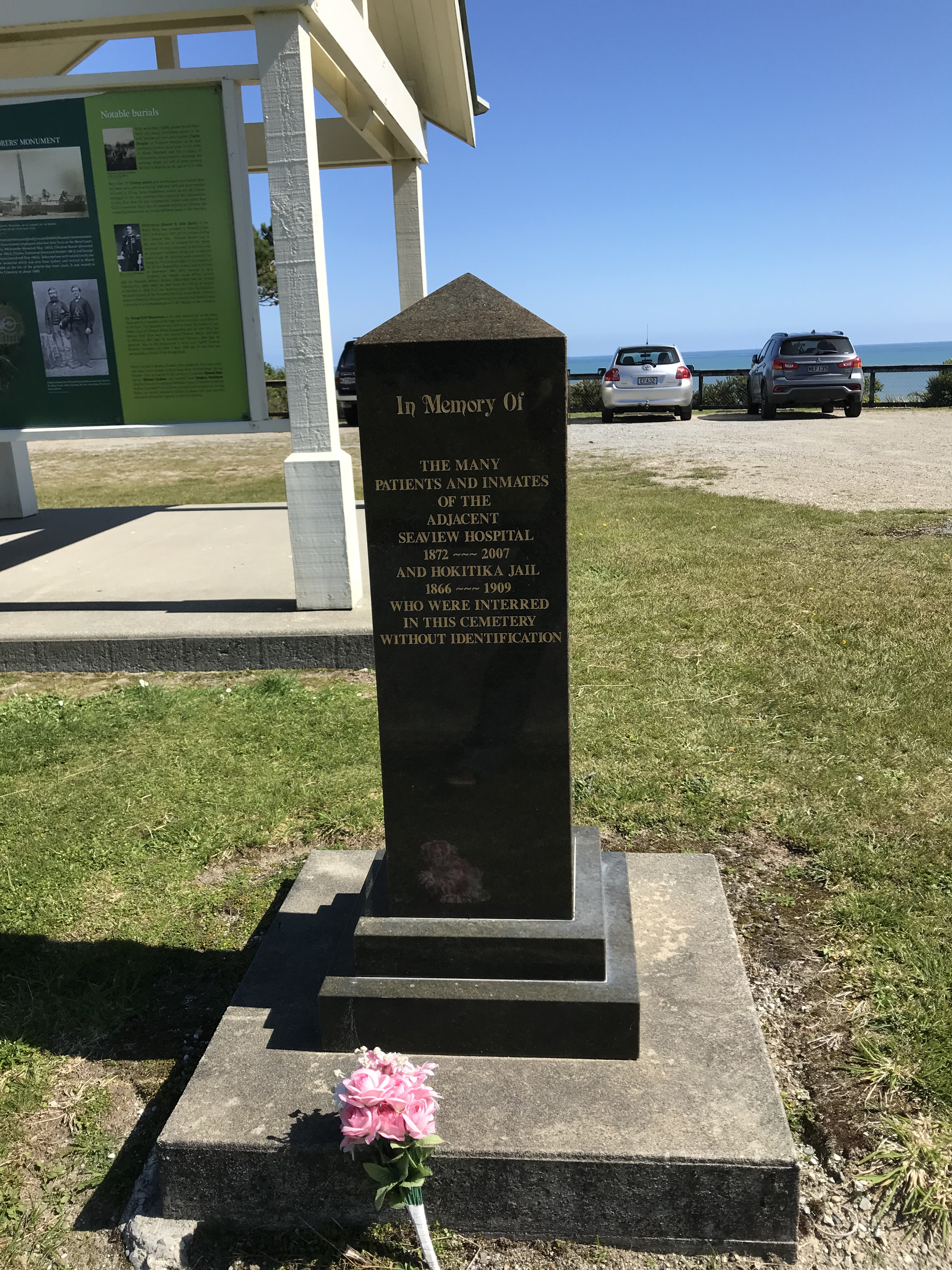
Hokitika Cemetery memorial for patients of Seaview Asylum and inmates of Hokitika Gaol who are buried in this cemetery without identification. Transcription: "In Memory of / the many / patients and inmates / of the / adjacent / Seaview Hospital / 1872–2007 / and Hokitika Jail / 1866–1909 / who were interred / in this cemetery / without identification"

In 2017 a suspicious fire damaged some of the remaining buildings. The land is now sparsely populated and many of the buildings are falling into disrepair, the swimming pool and tennis courts are abandoned but still retain key features such as the nets and diving boards. The through road, although unmaintained, is still passable from one end. The other end has been shut off as some of the land is being cleared.

Some of the buildings have been used as a hostel for long-term tenants and backpackers.

In August 2025 one of the remaining hospital building were destroyed by fire.
