= Westland Hospital =

Former hospital in Hokitika, New Zealand

Westland Hospital was one of two hospitals in Hokitika, on the West Coast of New Zealand. It was founded in 1865 and closed in 1989.

== History ==
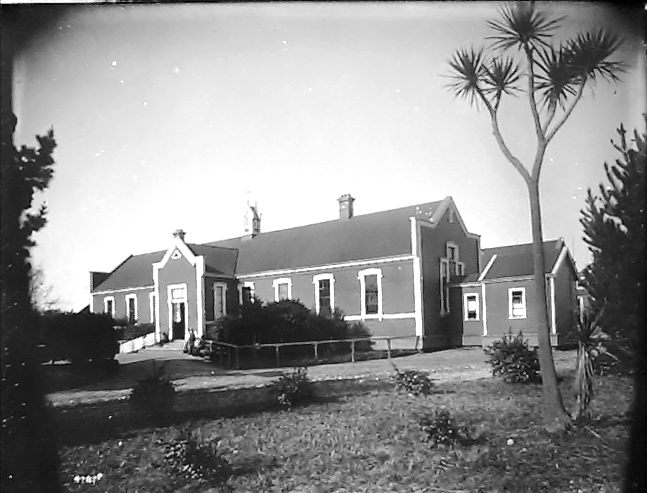
Westland Hospital, 1904

The hospital was founded in 1865 to the south of the Hokitika River and rebuilt about 1875 to the north of the town. It was located adjacent to the Seaview Asylum.

Ebenezer Teichelmann was appointed Surgical Superintendent in 1897, holding the position until 1914. He was assisted by his nurse Bess Hudson.

In 1906 there was a matron and four nurses. The hospital had three wards and accommodated 50 beds. In 1919 a foundation stone was laid for a war memorial wing which was completed in 1923. The wing was named the Mandl Wing in honour of Joseph Mandl a former mayor of Hokitika.

After a sit-in and protests, the Mandl Wing closed in 1985. The rest of the hospital closed in 1989 and the buildings were demolished in the 1990s.
