= Hokitika Savings Bank building =

Former bank building in New Zealand

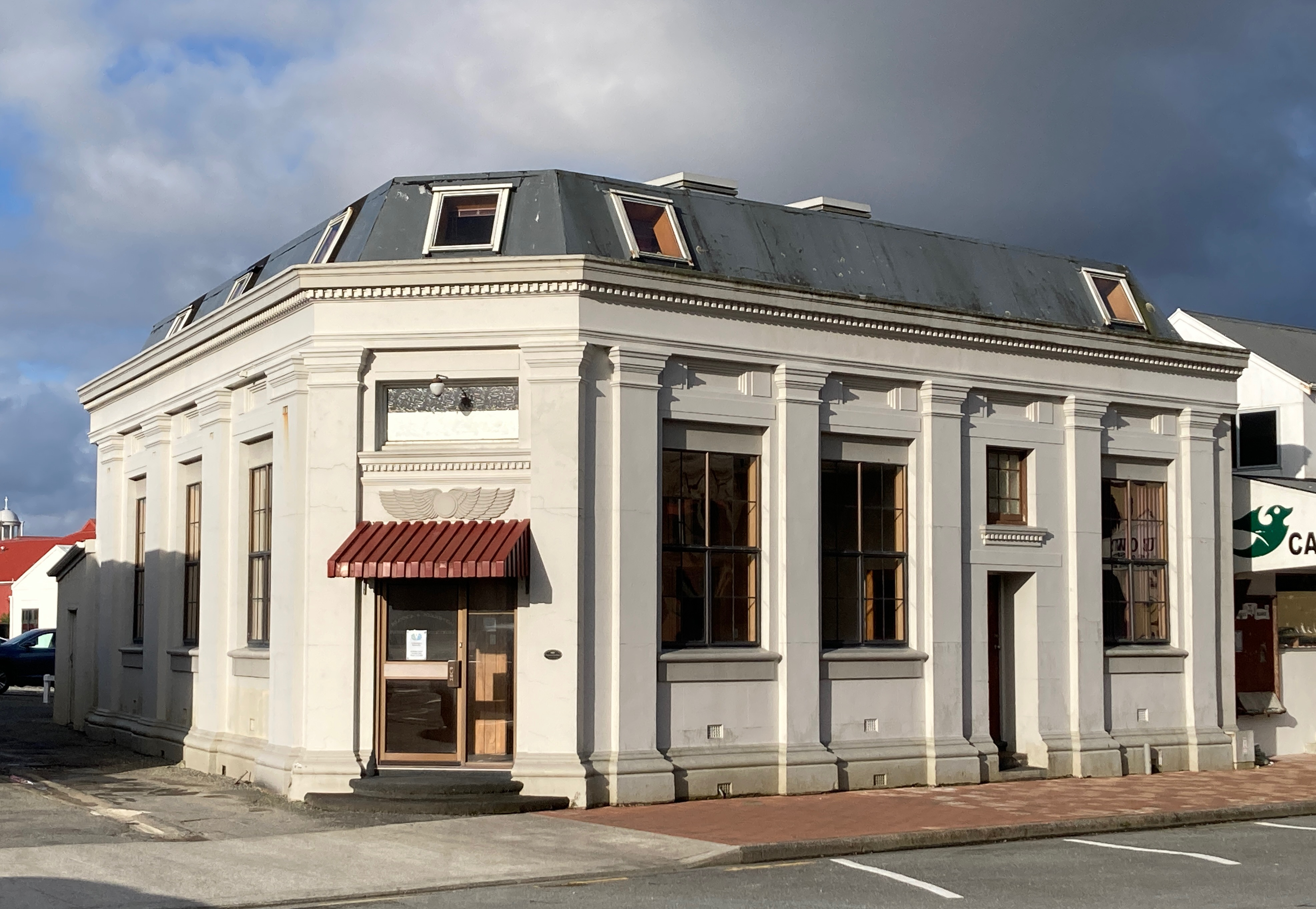
- Hokitika Savings Bank building in 2020

General information
- Type: Bank
- Architectural style: Neoclassical
- Address: 10 Hamilton Street
- Town or city: Hokitika
- Country: New Zealand
- Coordinates: 42°43′5.28″S 170°57′40.07″E
- Opened: 1927
- Cost: £3,106

Technical details
- Material: Plastered brick

Heritage New Zealand – Category 2
- Designated: 21 September 1989
- Reference no.: 5051

The Hokitika Savings Bank building is a former bank building in Hokitika, on the West Coast of New Zealand's South Island. Completed in 1927, the building was granted historic place category 2 status by Heritage New Zealand in 1989.

== Context ==
The Hokitika Savings Bank was established in 1866, during the West Coast gold rush, under the auspices of the Savings Bank Act 1858. Its first premises were in an old courthouse in Revell Street, Hokitika, but in 1880 the bank moved to a new wood and iron building in Hamilton Street. In May 1925, the trustees of the bank agreed to erect a new brick and concrete building on the existing site in Hamilton Street, to mark the bank's 60th jubilee in 1926, and draft plans were approved the following month.

== Construction and architecture ==
Construction of the new building on the existing site and an adjoining section commenced in February 1926, and was completed in early 1927, at a cost £3,106. During construction, the bank operated from temporary premises further along Hamilton Street, opposite Addison's store. Barrister and solicitor, and future mayor of Hokitika, Albert Elcock began operating his practice from the new building in January 1927, the Hokitika Savings Bank began trading from there the following month, on 17 February, and the bank trustees held their first meeting there on 15 March.

Designed in a stripped classical style and constructed of plastered brick, the Hokitika Savings Bank building presents street facades to Hamilton Street and Perry Lane on its southern and western elevations, with the main entrance on an angled facade at the corner, and a secondary entrance on the southern facade. The entrances and three bays of casement windows on the street facades are framed by simplified classical pilasters, and the building's parapet is topped by a cornice with supporting dentils. A mansard roof is clad with corrugated steel.

== Current status ==
The building was occupied by the Hokitika Savings Bank until 1964, when they moved to new premises in Revell Street. At that time, the building was purchased by legal firm Elcock and Johnston, who refurbished building in 1980, adding a second storey within the mansard roof space. In 1989, the former Hokitika Savings Bank building received historic place category 2 classification by the New Zealand Historic Places Trust (now Heritage New Zealand).

In 2020, the building was purchased by Te Rūnanga o Makaawhio, who intend to use it for their offices once earthquake strengthening has been completed.
