= Hokitika =

Town in West Coast, New Zealand

- Town
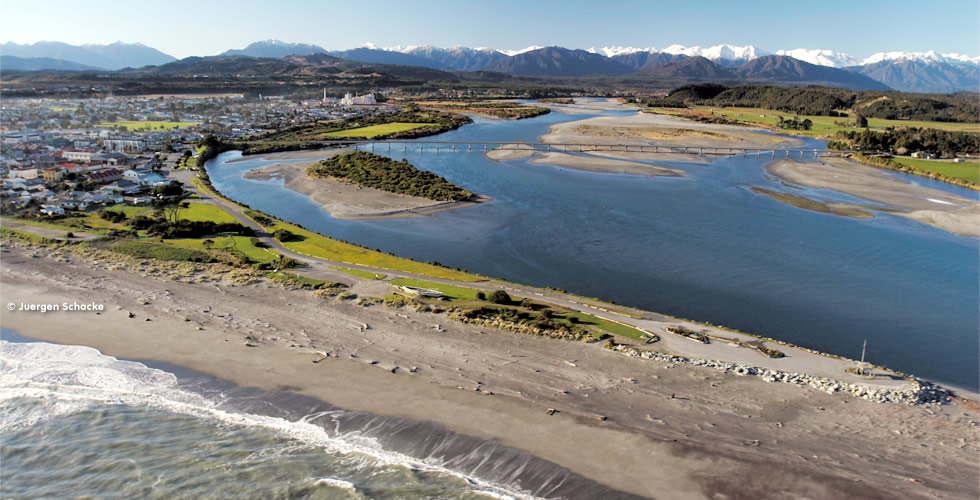
- Hokitika township
- Interactive map of Hokitika
- Coordinates: 42°42′56″S 170°58′5″E
- Country: New Zealand
- Region: West Coast
- District: Westland District
- Ward: Hokitika
- Settled by Europeans: 1864
- Electorates: West Coast-Tasman; Te Tai Tonga

Government
  - Territorial authority: Westland District Council
  - Regional council: West Coast Regional Council
  - Mayor of Westland: Helen Lash
  - West Coast-Tasman MP: Katie Milne
  - Te Tai Tonga MP: Mananui Ramsden

Area
  - Total: 11.78 km^{2} (4.55 sq mi)

Population (June 2025)
  - Total: 3,420
  - Density: 290/km^{2} (752/sq mi)
- Time zone: UTC+12 (NZST)
  - Summer (DST): UTC+13 (NZDT)
- Postcode(s): 7810
- Area code: 03
- Local iwi: Ngāi Tahu

Hokitika is a town in the West Coast region of New Zealand's South Island, 40 kilometres (25 mi) south of Greymouth, and close to the mouth of the Hokitika River. It is the seat and largest town in the Westland District. The town's estimated population is 3,420 as of June 2025.

On a clear day Aoraki / Mount Cook can clearly be seen from Hokitika's main street.

== Toponymy ==
The name Hokitika translates from Māori as "to return directly" (from hoki, 'to return', and tika, 'direct'). According to the Ministry for Culture and Heritage, the name comes from when a band of Ngāi Tahu warriors in search of greenstone were about to attack Ngāti Wairangi pā. The chief of the invaders drowned while trying to cross the Hokitika River, and the leaderless taua (army) then returned directly to their own home.

== History ==
The land where Hokitika stands was purchased in 1860 from Māori when Poutini Ngāi Tahu chiefs signed the Arahura Deed. This was the sale of the whole of the West Coast region, apart from small areas reserved for Māori. It was almost 3 million hectares and sold to the Crown for £300.

Founded on gold mining in 1864, it was a centre of the West Coast gold rush and grew very quickly. Members of the Jewish community ran stores and businesses and built a synagogue in Tancred St. One of them, John Lazar, was appointed Town Clerk in 1866 and was a prominent Freemason.

By late 1866, it was one of New Zealand's most populous centres. On 16 September 1867, there were 41 vessels alongside the wharf at Hokitika, in some places three and four deep. In 1867, the port of Hokitika ranked first in New Zealand in both the number of vessels entered inwards and in the total value of exports; principally gold.

On 8 March 1868 a mock funeral was held in protest about the conviction and hanging of three Irish Fenians in Manchester – the Manchester Martyrs. The funeral was led by Roman Catholic Father William Larkin and a Celtic Cross was erected in the Hokitika Cemetery. Larkin was later arrested, charged, and convicted of riot and seditious libel.

In 1873 Hokitika became the capital of the short-lived Westland Province which lasted from 1873 until the abolition of provinces in 1876.

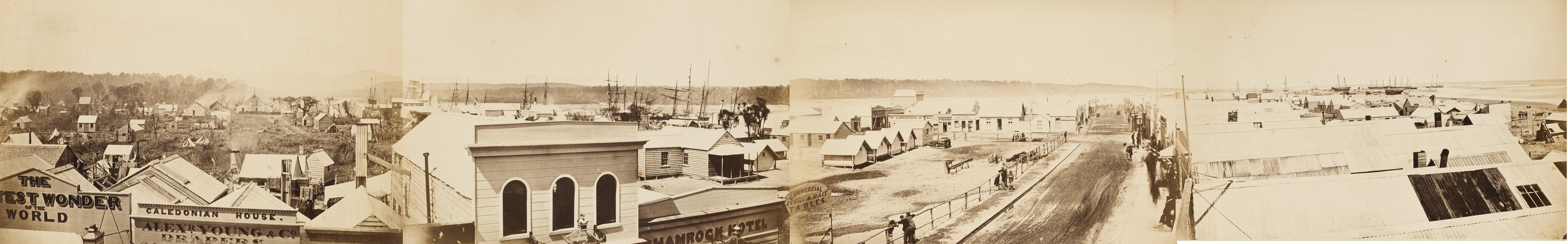
Panoramic view Hokitika, New Zealand, c. 1875

In the early 20th century Hokitika had two hospitals, the Westland Hospital and the Seaview Asylum.

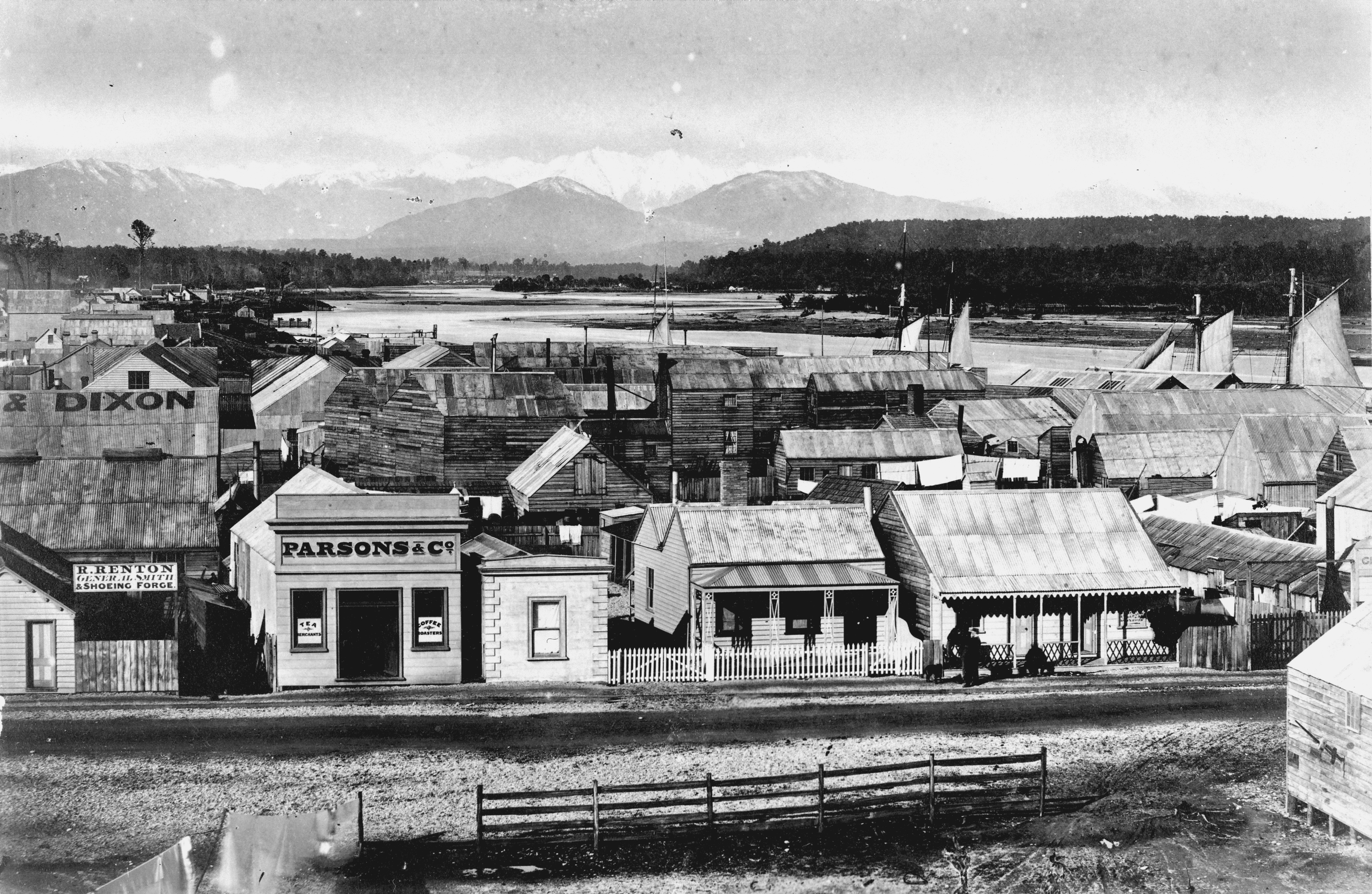
Hokitika township in the 1870s

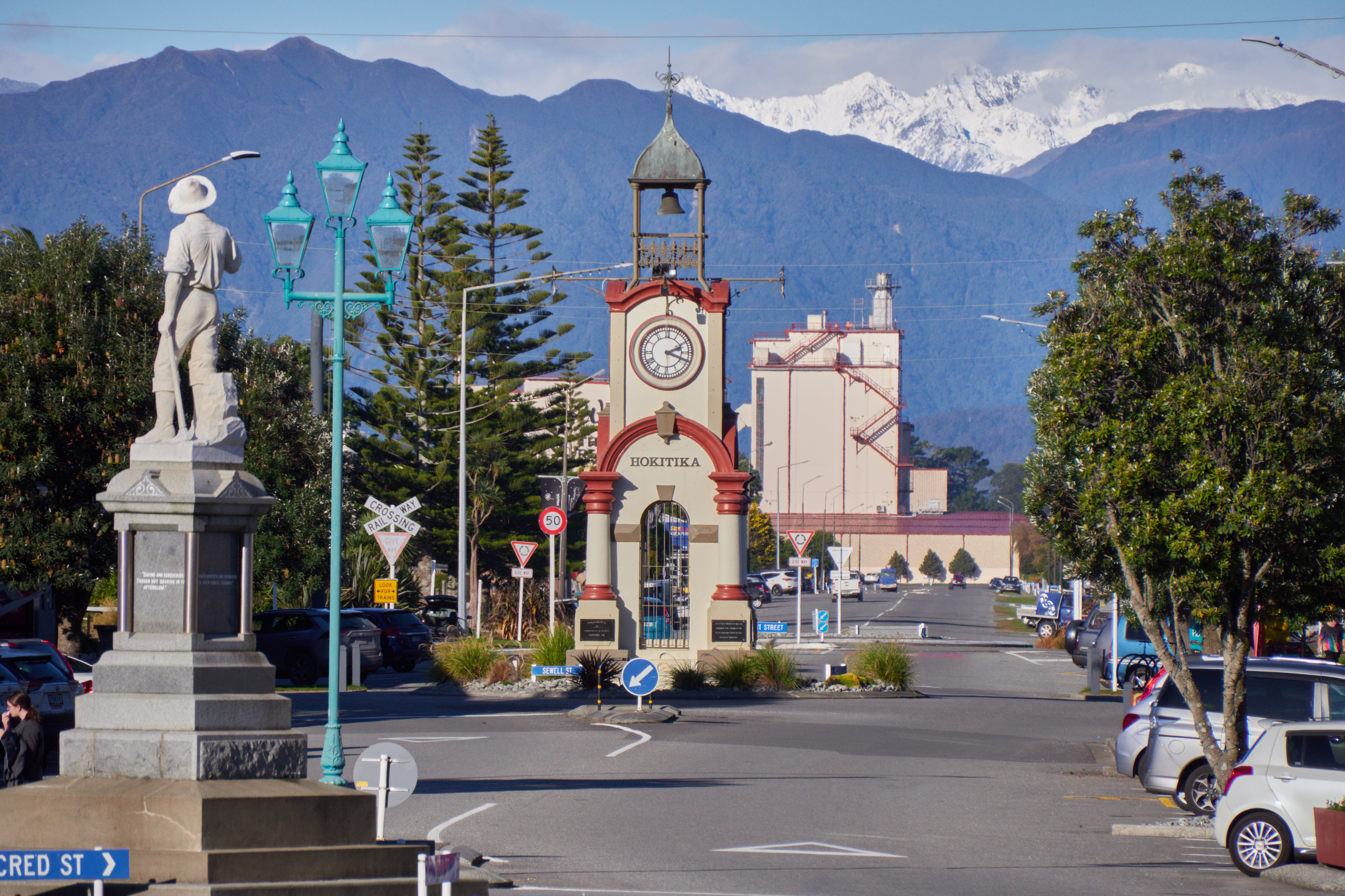
The Hokitika Clock Tower arch on Weld Street, with the Southern Alps visible in the background

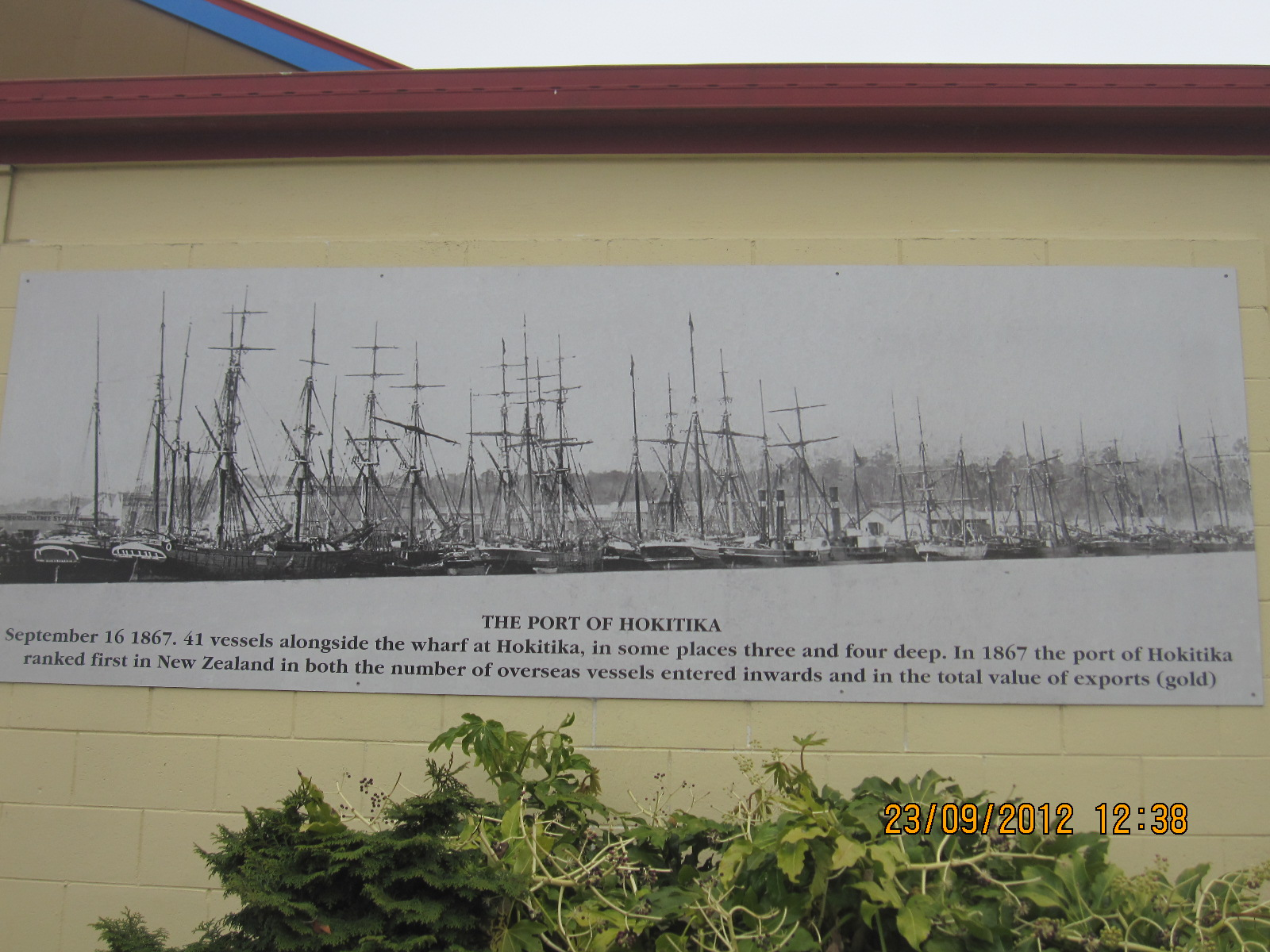
Port of Hokitika in 1867

In October 1941, three Hokitika police officers (and a policeman stationed in the neighbouring locality of Kaniere), along with a field instructor for the Canterbury education board, were killed when a local farmer, Stanley Graham, went on a shooting rampage and killed seven people, including two armed Home guard personnel.

In the ensuing manhunt, the biggest in New Zealand history, overseen by the Commissioner of Police, Denis Cummings, more than 100 New Zealand Police and several hundred New Zealand Army & Home Guard searched the area for the gunman for 12 days, with orders to shoot him on sight if found still armed. On 20 October, after being spotted by two police constables and a local civilian carrying his rifle and ammunition belts, Graham was fatally wounded by a police constable and died the next day.

The population has declined greatly since that time but the population of the Westland District is now on the rise thanks to "lifestyle inhabitants". Almost 30% of the district's rate-payers live outside of Hokitika.

== Geography ==
=== Climate ===
Hokitika has an oceanic climate, with mild summers, cool winters, and rainfall evenly distributed across the year. It is one of the wettest places in New Zealand, with over 2,800 mm (110 in) of rainfall per year.

Climate data for Hokitika Airport (1991–2020)
Month	Jan	Feb	Mar	Apr	May	Jun	Jul	Aug	Sep	Oct	Nov	Dec	Year
Record high °C (°F)	29.7 (85.5)	28.4 (83.1)	26.7 (80.1)	24.5 (76.1)	26.7 (80.1)	18.6 (65.5)	18.8 (65.8)	19.8 (67.6)	22.8 (73.0)	24.0 (75.2)	27.4 (81.3)	27.1 (80.8)	29.7 (85.5)
Mean daily maximum °C (°F)	19.5 (67.1)	19.9 (67.8)	18.8 (65.8)	16.6 (61.9)	14.6 (58.3)	12.5 (54.5)	12.0 (53.6)	12.6 (54.7)	13.9 (57.0)	14.9 (58.8)	16.3 (61.3)	18.2 (64.8)	15.8 (60.4)
Daily mean °C (°F)	15.8 (60.4)	16.0 (60.8)	14.7 (58.5)	12.6 (54.7)	10.6 (51.1)	8.4 (47.1)	7.6 (45.7)	8.4 (47.1)	9.9 (49.8)	11.2 (52.2)	12.6 (54.7)	14.5 (58.1)	11.9 (53.4)
Mean daily minimum °C (°F)	12.0 (53.6)	12.1 (53.8)	10.6 (51.1)	8.6 (47.5)	6.5 (43.7)	4.2 (39.6)	3.1 (37.6)	4.2 (39.6)	5.9 (42.6)	7.5 (45.5)	8.8 (47.8)	10.9 (51.6)	7.9 (46.2)
Record low °C (°F)	4.7 (40.5)	3.5 (38.3)	−0.4 (31.3)	−0.7 (30.7)	−2.2 (28.0)	−3.2 (26.2)	−4 (25)	−2.9 (26.8)	−2.1 (28.2)	−1.3 (29.7)	−0.6 (30.9)	2.9 (37.2)	−4 (25)
Average rainfall mm (inches)	257.4 (10.13)	191.7 (7.55)	213.4 (8.40)	244.9 (9.64)	252.8 (9.95)	261.2 (10.28)	228.0 (8.98)	246.9 (9.72)	244.7 (9.63)	284.8 (11.21)	222.9 (8.78)	272.1 (10.71)	2,920.8 (114.98)
Average rainy days (≥ 1.0 mm)	12.4	10.8	12.1	13.1	15.0	14.8	14.1	15.3	16.9	17.7	14.5	15.7	172.4
Average relative humidity (%)	83.8	87.2	87.1	85.3	87.8	87.4	85.4	85.2	81.7	84.1	80.9	82.9	84.9
Mean monthly sunshine hours	214.3	193.6	177.5	142.6	116.2	103.6	126.0	139.6	144.9	166.1	187.7	197.5	1,909.6
Source 1: NIWA Climate Data
Source 2: CliFlo

=== Hokitika Gorge ===
Nearby Hokitika Gorge is a popular short tourist walk, with vibrant blue water and a "swing" (metal rope suspension) bridge.

== Demographics ==
Hokitika is described as a small urban area by Stats NZ, and covers 11.78 km^{2} (4.55 sq mi). It has an estimated population of 3,420 as of June 2025, with a population density of 290 people per km^{2}.

Historical population
Year	Pop.	±% p.a.
2006	3,078	—
2013	3,165	+0.40%
2018	3,096	−0.44%
2023	3,267	+1.08%
The 2006 population is for a smaller area of 3.91 km^{2}. Source:

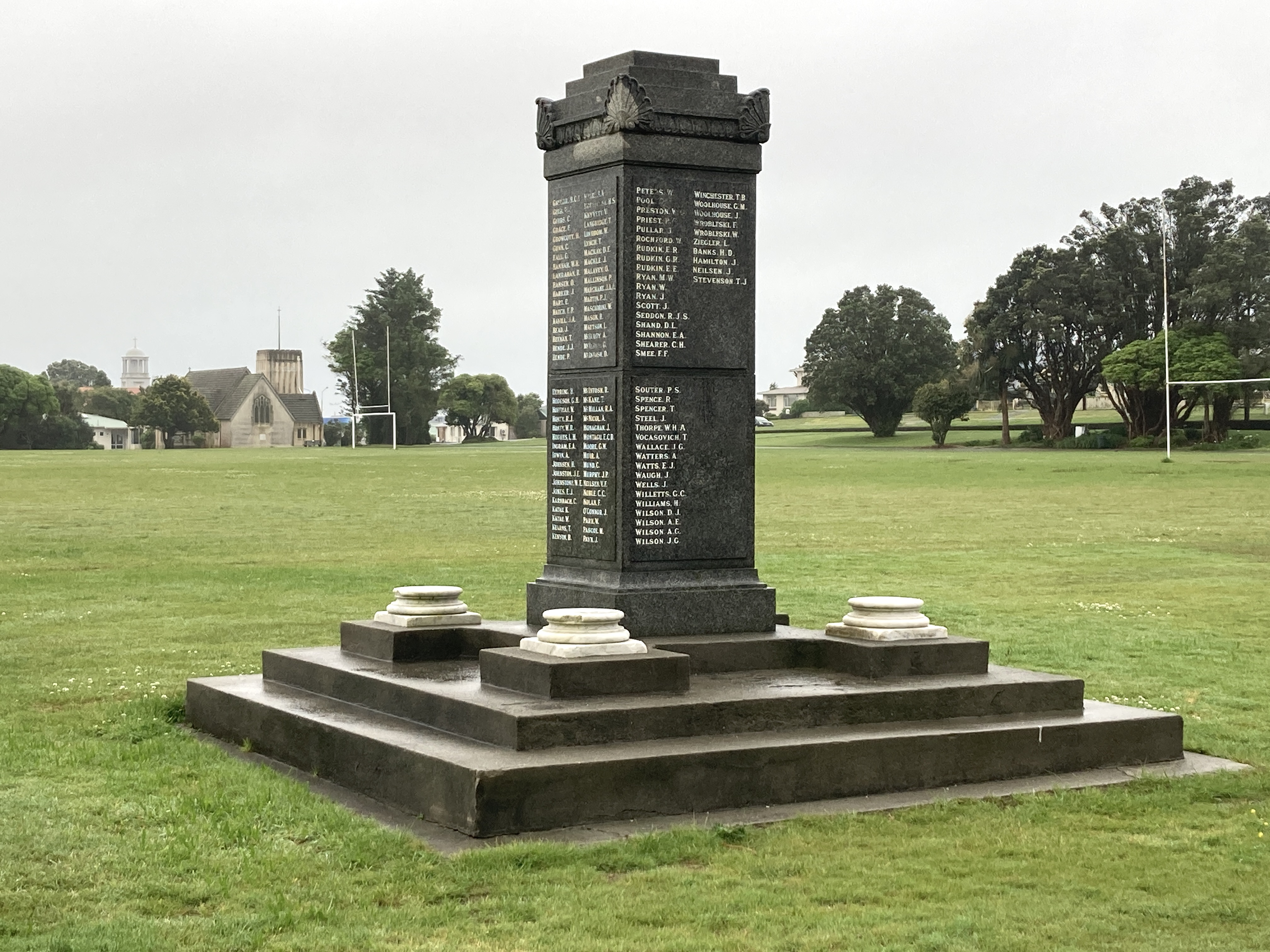
World War One Memorial, Cass Square

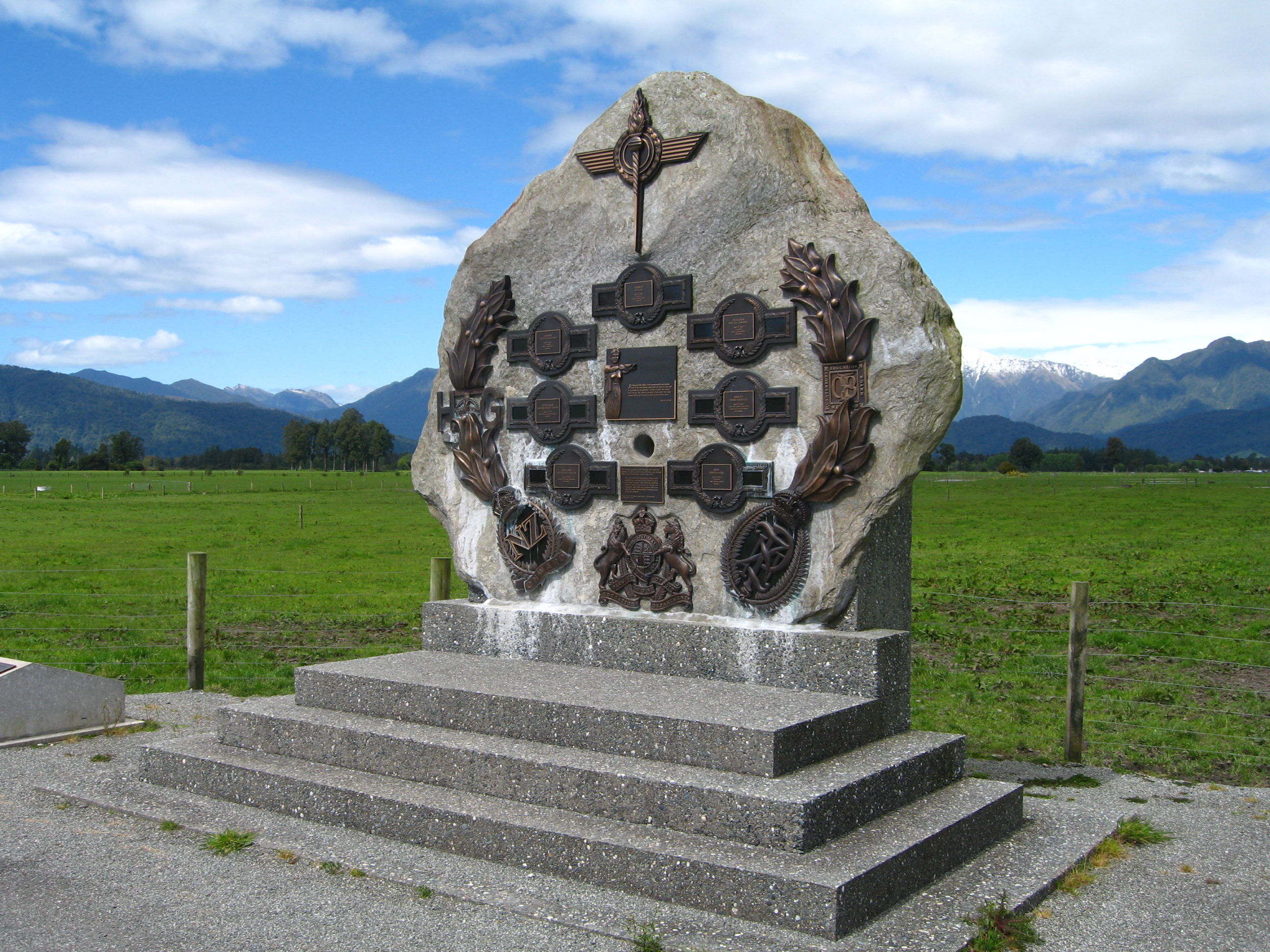
Memorial for the 1941 shooting, Kowhitirangi

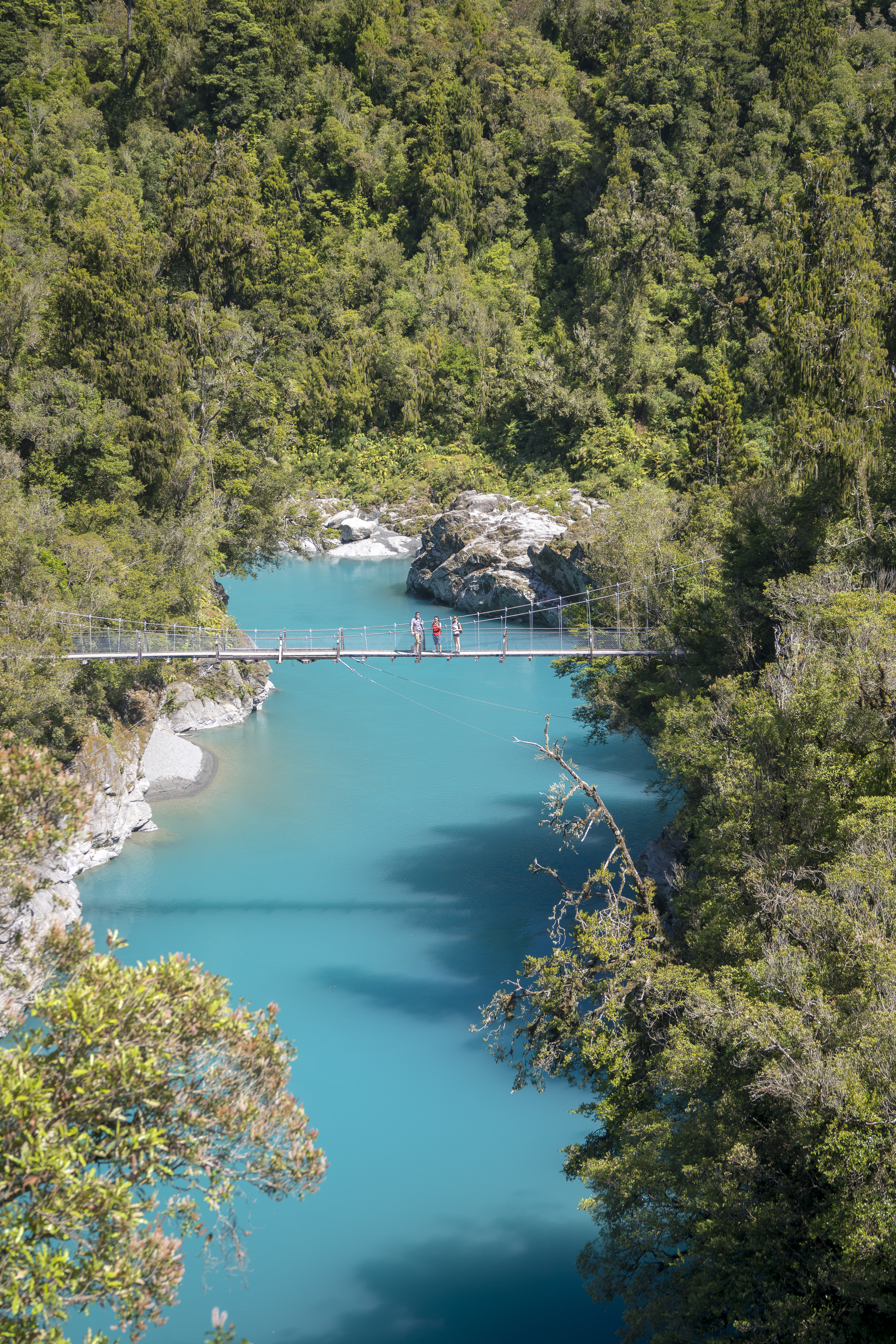
Hokitika Gorge, with swing bridge in the background. The turquoise blue colour is caused by glacial milk.

Hokitika had a population of 3,267 in the 2023 New Zealand census, an increase of 171 people (5.5%) since the 2018 census, and an increase of 102 people (3.2%) since the 2013 census. There were 1,587 males, 1,677 females, and 6 people of other genders in 1,461 dwellings. 3.0% of people identified as LGBTIQ+. The median age was 46.7 years (compared with 38.1 years nationally). There were 528 people (16.2%) aged under 15 years, 465 (14.2%) aged 15 to 29, 1,491 (45.6%) aged 30 to 64, and 786 (24.1%) aged 65 or older.

People could identify as more than one ethnicity. The results were 86.1% European (Pākehā); 21.3% Māori; 2.0% Pasifika; 5.2% Asian; 0.3% Middle Eastern, Latin American and African New Zealanders (MELAA); and 2.8% other, which includes people giving their ethnicity as "New Zealander". English was spoken by 97.8%, Māori by 4.3%, Samoan by 0.2%, and other languages by 6.8%. No language could be spoken by 1.6% (e.g. too young to talk). New Zealand Sign Language was known by 0.6%. The percentage of people born overseas was 13.4, compared with 28.8% nationally.

Religious affiliations were 33.2% Christian, 0.9% Hindu, 0.4% Islam, 0.7% Māori religious beliefs, 0.3% Buddhist, 0.9% New Age, and 0.8% other religions. People who answered that they had no religion were 54.0%, and 8.7% of people did not answer the census question.

Of those at least 15 years old, 429 (15.7%) people had a bachelor's or higher degree, 1,524 (55.6%) had a post-high school certificate or diploma, and 795 (29.0%) people exclusively held high school qualifications. The median income was $35,900, compared with $41,500 nationally. 189 people (6.9%) earned over $100,000 compared to 12.1% nationally. The employment status of those at least 15 was 1,320 (48.2%) full-time, 396 (14.5%) part-time, and 63 (2.3%) unemployed.

== Economy and culture ==
The major industries of greenstone (pounamu), gold, coal, and forestry have all dwindled over the last century, but a growing ecotourism industry has grown up and the town is starting to show signs of recovery. It has become a major tourist stop on the West Coast's main highway route, with carving of greenstone an important local industry. It is also gaining a reputation for its annual wild food festival which has been running since 1990.

Seaview Asylum was once the town's biggest employer.

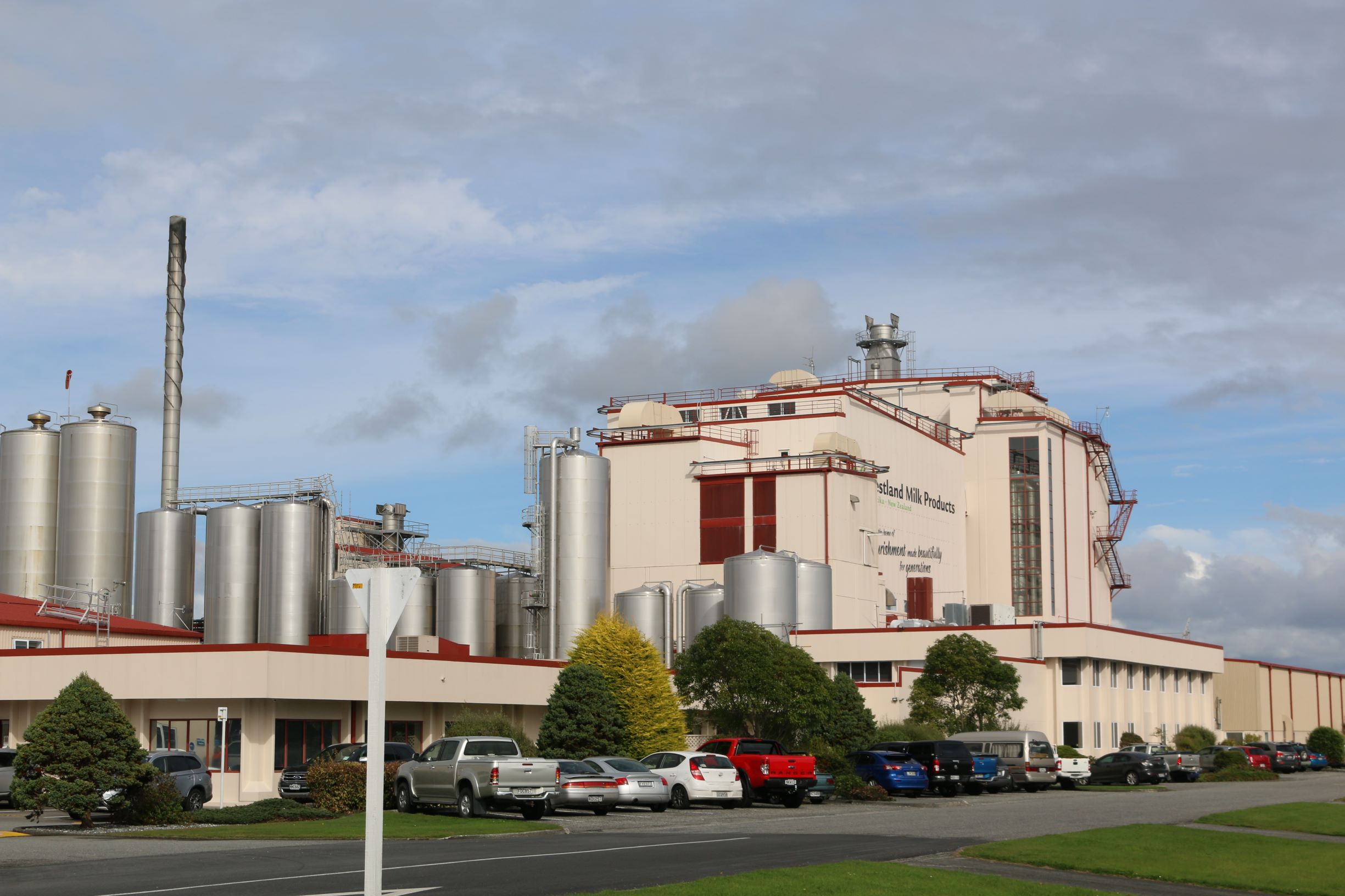
The Westland Milk factory in Hokitika (2021)

Another important industry is dairy farming, with Westland Milk Products having its headquarters and main processing plant in the town. Westland Milk Products was established as a dairy co-operative in 1937, and was sold to the Yili Group in 2019. It is the country's third-equal largest dairy processor as of 2018.

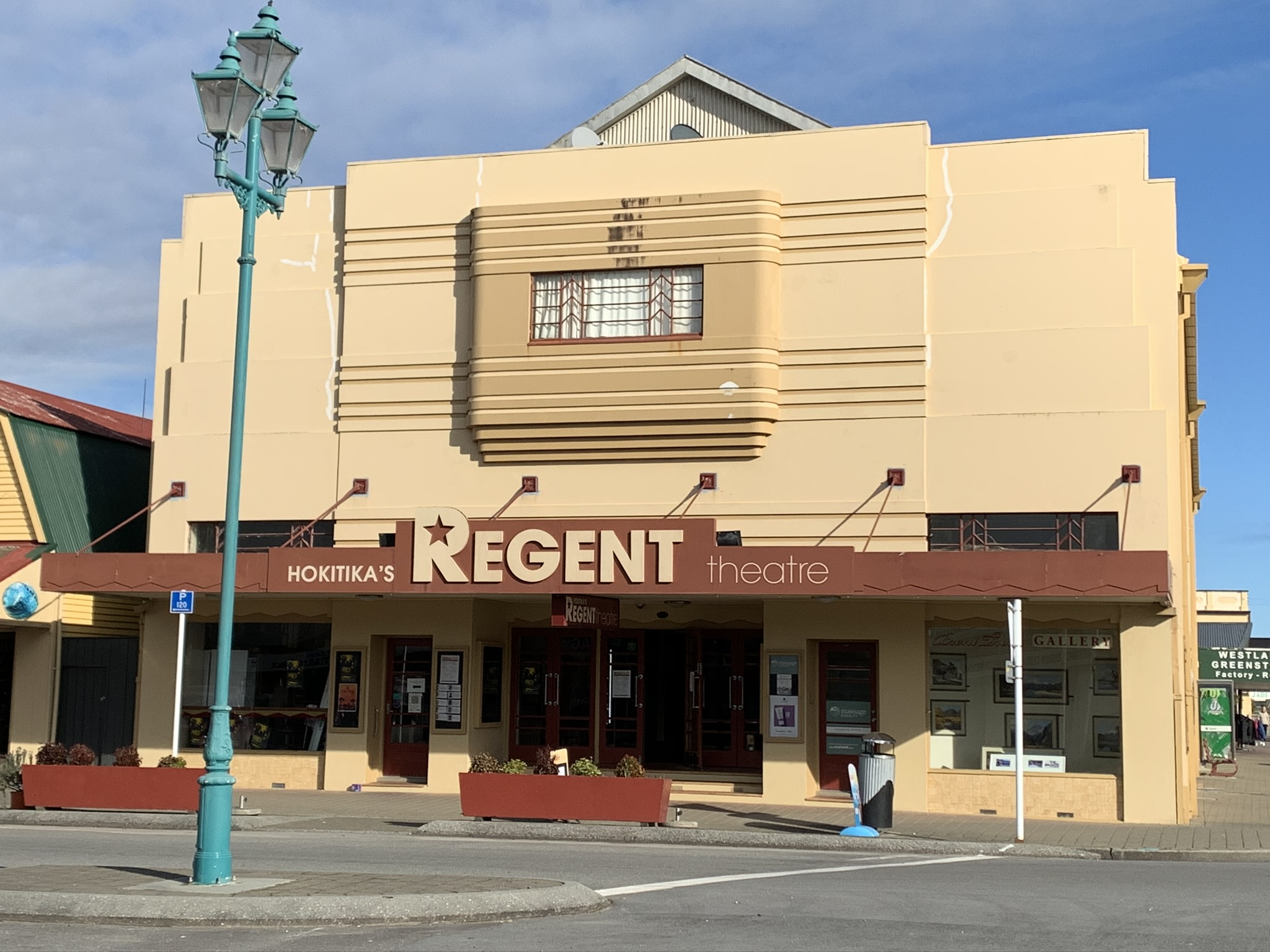
Hokitika's Regent Theatre

Hokitika's cinema, the Regent Theatre, is housed in an Art Deco style building which was constructed in 1935. It is an independent cinema, operated by the non-profit Westland Community Centre, which purchased the theatre in 1977 after community fundraising. The theatre building has undergone refurbishment and strengthening in 1979–1986 and 2007–2013, funded by grants from the Lion Foundation, New Zealand Lottery Grants Board, and Development West Coast through the Major District Initiative. Community performances are also held there, including local drama productions and concerts.

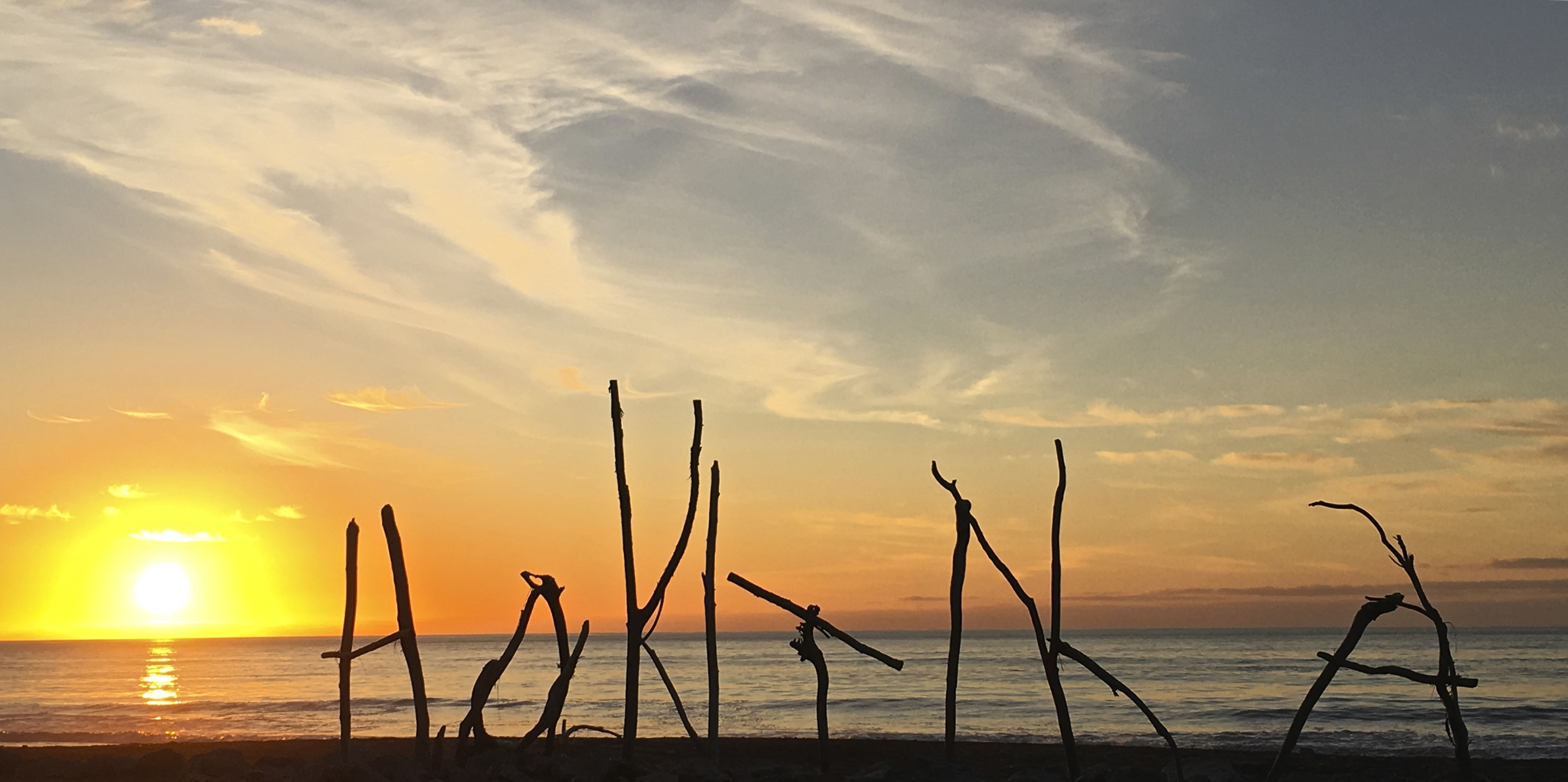
Hokitika driftwood sign marks the spot for the Driftwood and Sand Festival. The sign is a popular destination with tourists.

Every January, Hokitika beach hosts the Driftwood and Sand Festival. The festival involves members of the public and a sponsored artist constructing sculptures out of beach debris. Driftwood and Sand originated as a beach festival run by Hokitika artist Donald Buglass in November 2002, and it has been run as an annual festival since 2003.

The Hokitika Museum is housed in the town's Carnegie library building. The Sock World & Sock Knitting Machine Museum in Revell Street has on display a collection of antique sock-knitting machines. Visitors are invited to knit their own socks.

The main library for the Westland District is in Hokitika.

=== Marae ===
Arahura Marae is located near Hokitika. It is a marae (tribal meeting ground) of Ngāi Tahu and its Ngāti Waewae hapū, and includes the Tūhuru wharenui (meeting house).

In October 2020, the Government committed $161,131 from the Provincial Growth Fund to upgrade the marae, and create four jobs.

== Transport ==
=== Road ===
State Highway 6 passes through the town.

=== Rail ===
The first rail transport was the Hokitika & Kanieri Tramway laid with wooden rails was established in 1868, with cars drawn by horses. A road followed in 1873.

A branch line railway known as the Hokitika Branch was established to the town from Greymouth in 1893, and an extension to Ross was open from 1909 to 1980.

Passengers to Hokitika were initially served by mixed trains that carried both goods and passengers. In 1936, these services were augmented by a Leyland diesel railbus service that ran from Hokitika to Greymouth, Christchurch, and briefly Reefton. In the early 1940s, the Vulcan railcars were introduced and they provided a twice-daily service between Ross and Christchurch via Hokitika. The mixed trains continued to operate until 1967, and all passenger services to Hokitika ceased when the Vulcan railcars stopped running past Greymouth in 1972.

Since then, the line to Hokitika has been freight only with traffic primarily coming from Westland Milk Products.

=== Shipping ===
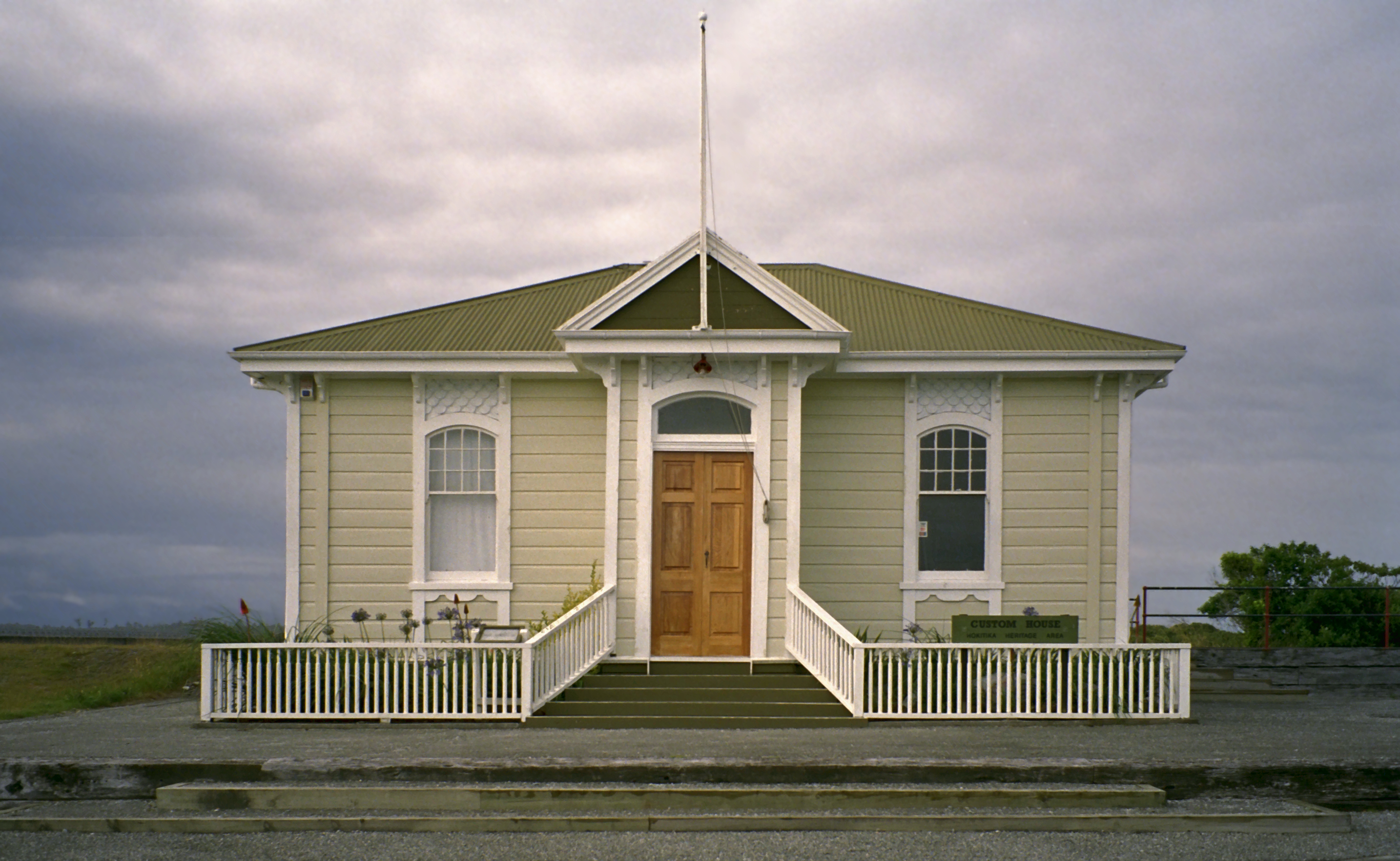
Hokitika Customhouse was built in 1895 when Hokitika was still an official port of entry to New Zealand.

In 1865, after the discovery of gold in the area, the town became the official port of entry of the West Coast. A boom period ensued when Hokitika was second only to Auckland, with reports of over 40 ships in the harbour at one time, with more waiting offshore. It was a dangerous port, with 108 strandings and 32 ships lost from 1865 to 1867. The lack of nearby coal meant that the port declined rapidly along with the gold, though Hokitika remained an official entry port until the 1950s.

=== Air ===
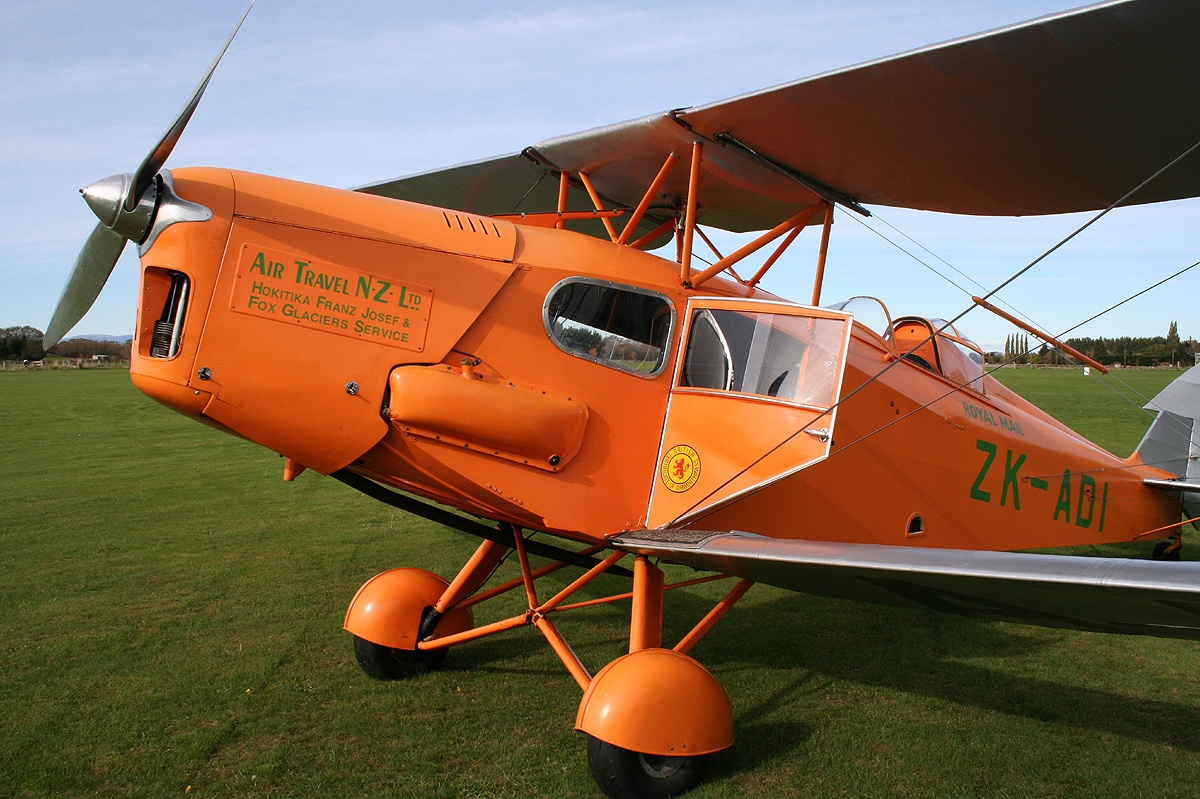
De Havilland DH-83 Fox Moth ZK-ADI, Air Travel's first aircraft

Air New Zealand provides two flights a day to Christchurch. The Hokitika Airport is adjacent to the town, immediately to the north-east in the suburb of Seaview.

Hokitika's Southside airfield was the base of Air Travel, New Zealand's first airline. Air Travel carried passengers, mail and freight south from Hokitika to the glaciers and remote landing strips beyond Haast and north up to Westport. Its first scheduled flight was in December 1934. Directors were Hokitika residents: Bert Mercer, Paul Renton and Harry Newman.

After the second world war, Air Travel was nationalised and became part of NAC.

== Education ==
Westland High School caters for years 7 to 13 and has a roll of 404. It opened in 1880, became a high school in 1884 and then the Hokitika District School in 1891. It was renamed Westland High School in 1963.

Hokitika School is a contributing primary (years 1–6) school with a roll of 165. A primary school was open in Hokitika in 1865.

St Mary's School is a full primary (years 1–8) school with a roll of 137. It is a state integrated Catholic school and is connected with St Mary's Catholic Church. It was open by 1869. In 1877 there were both girls' and boys' state schools in Hokitika, and St Mary's which was a boys' or coeducational school. The girls' school was run by the Sisters of Mercy from 1878 and the boys' school from 1892. They also ran a high school, but that school closed in 1973. The schools were called St Mary's Primary School and St Mary's High School.

All these schools are coeducational. Rolls are as of July 2026.

== Notable people ==
- Agnes Addison (c. 1842–1903), Scottish draper who was one of Hokitika's early businesswomen.
- Margaret Andrews Alcorn (1868–1967) and her sister Mary Alcorn (1866–1928) were interior designers and business owners
- Charles Button (1838–1920), mayor of Hokitika, solicitor, judge, and MP
- John Urquhart Cropp (1927–2016), Olympic yachtsman
- Edward St John Daniel (1837–1868), Victoria Cross recipient, died and is buried in Hokitika
- Charlie Douglas (1840–1916), explorer and surveyor
- Alice Eyton (1874–1929), journalist, screenwriter, playwright, and novelist in Hollywood
- Stanley Graham (1900–1941), a farmer who killed seven people and was the target of New Zealand's biggest manhunt
- Bess Hudson (1875–1961), early nurse, for Dr Teichelmann
- Al Hunter (born 1950), musician, singer-songwriter
- John Lazar (1840–1916), actor, town clerk, mason
- Sharlotte Lucas (born 1991), road cyclist
- Fayne Robinson (born 1964), Māori carver
- Holly Robinson (born 1994), athlete born in Hokitika
- John Rutherford Ryley (1837–1884), who introduced antiseptic technique to New Zealand, was surgeon at Hokitika Hospital at the time
- Richard Seddon (1845–1906), New Zealand politician and Premier
- Ebenezer Teichelmann (1859–1938), surgeon, mountaineer, photographer and conservationist

== Notable buildings ==
- Hokitika Customhouse, built 1897, a Category I historic place
- The Hokitika Clock Tower, built 1902/3, the most prominent landmark in Hokitika
- Hokitika Museum, housed in the former Carnegie Library, built 1908
- Seaview Asylum, founded 1872 and once the town's biggest employer
- All Saints' Church, a prominent landmark and early unfaced concrete church
- St Andrew's United Church, built in 1935, a good example of a small Gothic parish church
- Renton Hardware building (also known as the Okitiki building), completed in 1908, a Category 2 historic place
- Government Buildings (also known as Seddon House), completed in 1913, a Category 1 historic place
- St Mary's Catholic Church, a Category 1 historic place
- Hokitika Savings Bank building, a Category 2 historic place

== Sister cities ==
Hokitika has one sister city.

- Deloraine, Australia

== In popular culture ==
The events of The Luminaries, by Eleanor Catton, take place within and around Hokitika. The book won the Man Booker Prize in 2013.

The novel Hokitika Town, by Charlotte Randall, is set in Hokitika.

The 2004 historical novel The Colour by Rose Tremain is partially set in 1860s Hokitika.

The 1999 movie Magik and Rose was filmed and set in Hokitika.

== See also ==
- Mayor of Hokitika
- Westland Pioneers' Memorial
