= Politics of Niue =

The politics of Niue take place in a framework of a parliamentary representative democratic dependency, whereby the Prime Minister is the head of government, and of a non-partisan system. Niue is self-governing in free association with New Zealand and is fully responsible for internal affairs. New Zealand retains some responsibility for external affairs, in consultation with Niue. The Niue Constitution Act 1974 (NZ) vests executive authority in His Majesty the King in Right of New Zealand and the Governor-General of New Zealand. The constitution specifies that in everyday practice, it is exercised by a Cabinet of the Prime Minister of Niue and three other ministers. The premier and ministers must be members of the Niue Assembly, the nation's legislative assembly. The Judiciary is independent of the executive and the legislature.

== Executive branch ==
Main office-holders
Office	Name	Party	Since
Monarch	Charles III		8 September 2022
Governor-General	Cindy Kiro		28 September 2021
Prime Minister	Dalton Tagelagi	Independent	11 June 2020

The monarch is hereditary; his representative in relation to Niue (the Governor-General of New Zealand) is appointed by the monarch. The New Zealand high commissioner is appointed by, and acts solely as a diplomatic agent of, the New Zealand Government. The cabinet is chosen by the prime minister and appointed by the Speaker of the Niue Assembly and collectively responsible to Parliament.

=== Cabinet ===
The Cabinet is made up of four ministers, each overseeing a different portfolio. Each minister, with the exception of the Prime Minister, has another Member of the Assembly assisting him/her in the operations of their portfolio. Each ministry also has Directory Generals serving as permanent employees of the ministries, as well as directors for each division.

Minister	Portfolio	Constituency	Assistant Minister
Dalton Tagelagi	Prime Minister Minister for Central and Commercial Agencies; Responsible for the departments of Cabinet & Legislative; Crown Law; NPSC & Secretariat; Police and National Security; Commercial Agencies	Alofi South	
Crossley Tatui	Minister of Finance and Infrastructure Responsible for the departments of Finance and Planning; Transport; Communications; Utilities	Common roll representative	
Mona Ainu'u	Minister of Natural Resources Responsible for the departments of Agriculture, Forestry and Fishery; Meteorological Services; Environment	Tuapa	
Sauni Tongatule	Minister for Education and Social Services Responsible for the departments of Justice; Taoga Niue; Education; Health	Common roll representative	

== Legislative branch ==
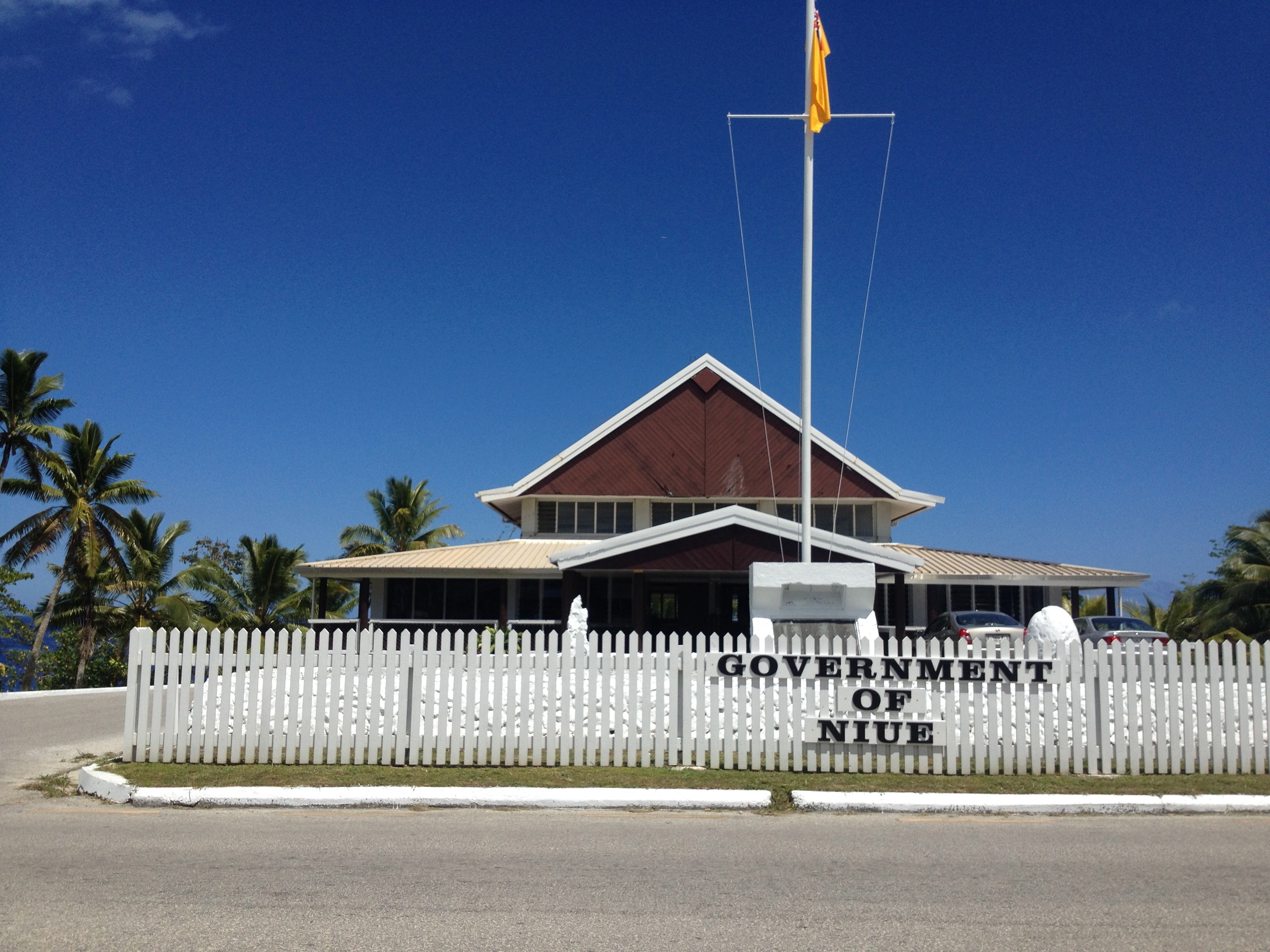
Government House of Niue

The Assembly has 20 members elected for a three-year term, 6 elected on a nationwide list, called the common roll, and 14 representatives of the villages. Electors must be New Zealand citizens, resident for at least three months, and candidates must have been electors, resident for twelve months. The speaker is elected from among the members.

== Political parties and elections ==
In Niue, political parties have never played an important role. There is, at present, no political party, and candidates to elections therefore run as independents. The only party ever to have existed, the Niue People's Party, disbanded in 2003.

As there are no political parties, there is no formal parliamentary opposition, though there are MPs who oppose the government.

=== By-elections ===
Below is a list of recent by-elections:

Election	Date	Reason	Winner
1988 Common Roll by-election	November 1988		O'Love Jacobsen
1997 Common Roll by-election	15 February 1997	Death of Toeono Tongatule	Billy Talagi
2001 Common Roll by-election	2 April 2001	Resignation of Hima Douglas	Hunuki Hunukitama
2003 Common Roll by-election	30 August 2003	Death of Hunuki Hunukitama	Krypton Okesene
2012 Toi by-election	31 March 2012	MP disqualified due to improperly administered oath	Dion Taufitu

== Judicial branch ==
The Judicial Committee of the Privy Council sitting in the United Kingdom is Niue's highest court. On the island, there is a Court of Appeal (which sat in New Zealand until 2009), and the High Court of Niue.

The current Chief Justice of the High Court is Craig Coxhead. The Chief Justice is chosen by the Governor-General of New Zealand on advice from the cabinet of Niue.

=== Public Defender of Niue ===
Initially, it was the Crown Counsel of New Zealand that provided legal assistance to those accused of serious offenses such as murder. In 1971, the Select Committee on the Appointment of a Public Defender recommended that the Government of Niue provide any offenders with court representation. John Funaki (a non-attorney) was the first to serve as the Public Defender of Niue in 1976. Even today, the government provides funding for a Public Defender.

== Administrative divisions ==
Niue is divided in 14 villages, each with its own village council whose members are elected and serve three-year terms.

== International organization participation ==
- African, Caribbean, and Pacific Group of States (Cotounu Convention)
- U.N. Economic and Social Committee for Asia and the Pacific (associate)
- Intelsat (nonsignatory user)
- Pacific Islands Forum
- South Pacific Regional Trade and Economic Co-operation Agreement (SPARTECA)
- The Pacific Community (SPC)
- United Nations Educational, Scientific and Cultural Organization (UNESCO)
- World Health Organization
- World Meteorological Organization

== Local government ==
Local Government in Niue is established under the provisions of the Niue Village Council Act 1967. Every village in Niue has a Village council, the term in office is three years before going back to the polls. The election of the members of the village council follows the same rules and regulations used in the General Election to elect members of the Niue Legislative Assembly (parliament). At the first meeting of the Village Council the Chairman will be elected, including the Deputy Chair and the appointment of the Secretary/Treasurer. The Village Council receives grants from the Government, donor agencies also fund some development projects. The Council use to organize show days and conduct fundraising activities to generate revenue to help run some of the activities of the village.

=== Attorney General of Niue ===
Before achieving independence in 1974, there was an Attorney General for Niue that also served as the Attorney General for New Zealand. However, it would not be until 1996 that Niue would create the official title of Attorney General after amending the Niue Act 1966. Nevertheless, the amendment would not create much of a constitutional change, and the introduction of the Interpretation Act 2004 instated the Crown Law Office as providing legal advice to the Niue government. As a result, it was advised in 2004 that the post of Attorney General be repealed.

The head of the Crown Law Office functions as a public servant, and the Public Service Commission designates the titles for the service officers. The Crown Law Office is responsible for advising the government ministries, and advises the police in regards to criminal prosecution. Due to the lack of attorneys in Niue, there are certain instances in which the office will provide legal presentation to Niue residents.

Attorney General of Niue	Years of Service
A'e'au Semi Epati	c. 1995-1996
Warner Banks	c. 1997-1999
Togia Sioneholo*	c. 2002-2004

*He may have spent the majority of his service as the Acting Attorney General as the Niue government had difficulty filling the position.

== See also ==
- Cabinet of Niue
- Electoral calendar
- Electoral system
- Foreign relations of Niue
- List of political parties by country to browse parties by country
