= 1987 New Year Honours (New Zealand) =

Awards list for New Zealand

The 1987 New Year Honours in New Zealand were appointments by Elizabeth II on the advice of the New Zealand government to various orders and honours to reward and highlight good works by New Zealanders. The awards celebrated the passing of 1986 and the beginning of 1987, and were announced on 31 December 1986.

The recipients of honours are displayed here as they were styled before their new honour.

== Knight Bachelor ==
- The Right Honourable (Mr Justice) Duncan Wallace McMullin – of Wellington; judge of the Court of Appeal.
- Francis Henry Renouf – of Wellington. For philanthropic services.

== Order of the Bath ==
=== Companion (CB) ===
Military division

- Rear Admiral Lincoln John Tempero – Royal New Zealand Navy; Chief of Naval Staff.

== Order of Saint Michael and Saint George ==
=== Companion (CMG) ===
- Adam Miller Begg – of Stirling; chairman, New Zealand Meat Producers Board.

== Order of the British Empire ==
=== Dame Commander (DBE) ===
Civil division

- Dr Marie Mildred Clay – of Auckland. For services to education.
- Dorothy Rita Fraser QSO JP – of Dunedin. For services to the Otago Hospital Board and the community.
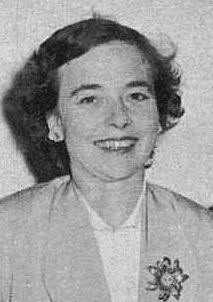
Dame Dorothy Fraser

=== Commander (CBE) ===
Civil division

- Richard Gray Collins – of Wellington. For public services.
- Dr Daniel Marcus Davin MBE – of Oxford, England. For services to literature.
- Dr Richard Henry Lindo Ferguson JP – of Auckland. For services to medicine, education, local government and the community.
- Alison Margaret Holst QSM – of Wellington. For services to home science.
- Jocelyn Margaret Keith – of Wellington. For services to nursing.
- Ernest John Neilson – of Christchurch. For services to marketing, export and the community.
- The Honourable Evan Murray Prichard – of Auckland; lately judge of the High Court.
- Kenneth Owen Thompson LVO QPM – Commissioner of Police, New Zealand Police.
- Mavis Ada Tiller OBE – of Wellington. For services to the community.

Military division

- Brigadier Geoffrey Andrew Hitchings MBE – Brigadiers' List, New Zealand Forces South East Asia (now retired).
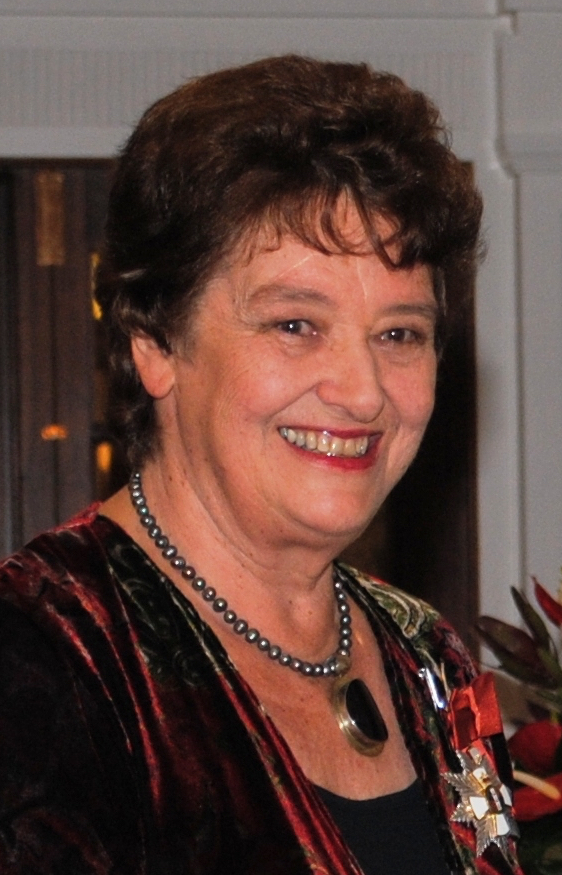
Alison Holst

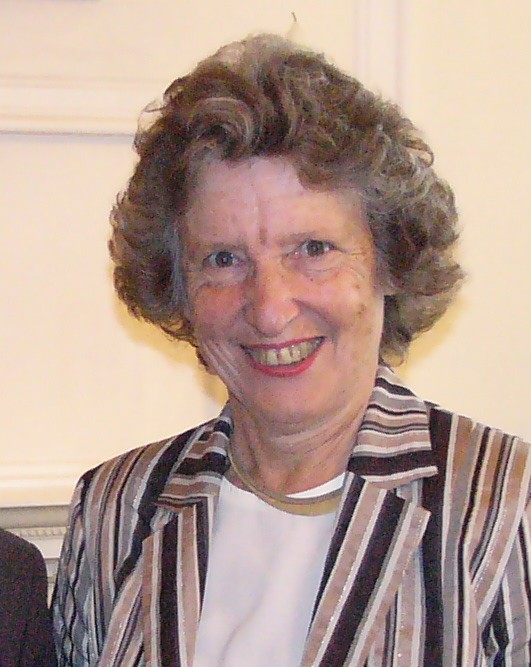
Jocelyn Keith

=== Officer (OBE) ===
Civil division

- Eric Albert Cammell JP – of Auckland. For services to the meat industry and local-body affairs.
- Graham Thorne Dowling – of Christchurch. For services to cricket.
- Roland Woodroffe Earp – of Tauranga. For services to the kiwifruit industry.
- James Lennon Fahy JP – of Auckland; managing director, Accident Compensation Corporation, 1981–1985.
- Duncan Kenneth Hamilton – of Auckland. For services to the tourist industry.
- Terence John Harris – of Pukekohe. For public services.
- Louis Albert Johnson – of Wellington. For services to literature.
- James Richard Joyce – of Napier. For services to local-body and trade-union affairs.
- Duncan Maclean – of Auckland. For services to local-body affairs.
- Dr John Forman Mann JP – of Christchurch. For services to education and the community.
- William Harold Martin – of Whangārei. For services to the fishing industry.
- John Rowdon Milne – of Auckland. For services to the tourist industry and the community.
- Evelyn Margaret Page – of Wellington. For services to art.
- Dr William James Pryor – of Christchurch. For services to anaesthetics and the medical profession.
- William James Robertson – of Dunedin. For services to education.
- Lionel Martin Stevens – chief superintendent, New Zealand Police.
- Noel Bruce Ullrich – of Christchurch. For services to sport.
- Valerie Isobel Margaret Young – of Christchurch. For services to athletics.

Military division

- Commander Kenneth James Robertson – Royal New Zealand Navy.
- Lieutenant Colonel (now Colonel) David McGregor ED – Territorial Force, New Zealand Army.
- Group Captain William Ross Donaldson MBE – Royal New Zealand Air Force.
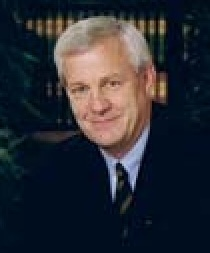
Bruce Ullrich

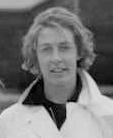
Valerie Young

=== Member (MBE) ===
Civil division

- Maureen Evelyn Bamford – of Balclutha. For services to education.
- Graham Neil Bartlett – of Auckland. For services to entertainment.
- Lucy Miriam Brook – of Gisborne. For services to music.
- Francis James Cameron – of Dunedin. For services to cricket.
- Terry Magaoa Chapman – of Alofi, Niue; secretary to the Government of Niue.
- The Reverend Dr Maru George Check JP – of Blenheim. For services to education and the community.
- Dr Agnes Elizabeth Coates-Earl (Mrs Armstrong) – of Auckland. For services to the community.
- Hana Lyola Cotter – of Napier. For services to the community.
- Frank Leslie Coutts JP – of Napier. For services to the trade-union movement and the community.
- Jean Aleen Mae Dougall – chief inspector, New Zealand Police.
- Vera Irene Dowie JP – of Auckland. For services to women.
- Dr Dennis Joseph Janus – of Christchurch. For services to the community.
- The Reverend Dr Matthew Alexander McDowell – of Waikanae. For services to the community.
- Jean Isobel McInnes – of Oamaru. For services to the community.
- John David McNab – of Waikane; lately director (special duties), Ministry of Agriculture and Fisheries.
- Ernest Philip Markham – of Auckland. For services to the community.
- Robert Grant Moffat – of Wainuiomata. For services to local government.
- Lesley Jean Murdoch – of Christchurch. For services to hockey and cricket.
- Dr John Shirley Phillips – of Waikanae; lately director of Clinical Services Division, Department of Health.
- Norman Arthur Reynolds JP – of Orewa. For services to the Baptist Church and the community.
- Ian Stuart Russell – of New Plymouth. For services to swimming and the community.
- Rosalie Hearn Somerville – of Dunedin. For services to adult education.
- Ewen Martin Wainscott JP – of Auckland. For services to the architectural profession.
- Joseph Williams JP – of Hokianga. For services to the community.

Military division

- Lieutenant Commander Colin Leslie Campbell – Royal New Zealand Navy.
- Major Jeffrey Raymond Bright – Corps of Royal New Zealand Electrical and Mechanical Engineers.
- Warrant Officer Class I Busby Otene – Royal New Zealand Infantry Regiment.
- Squadron Leader Malcolm John Turnbull – Royal New Zealand Air Force.
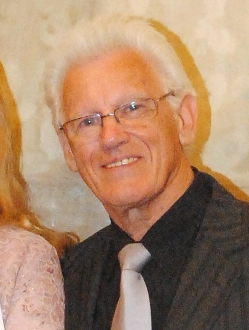
Gray Bartlett

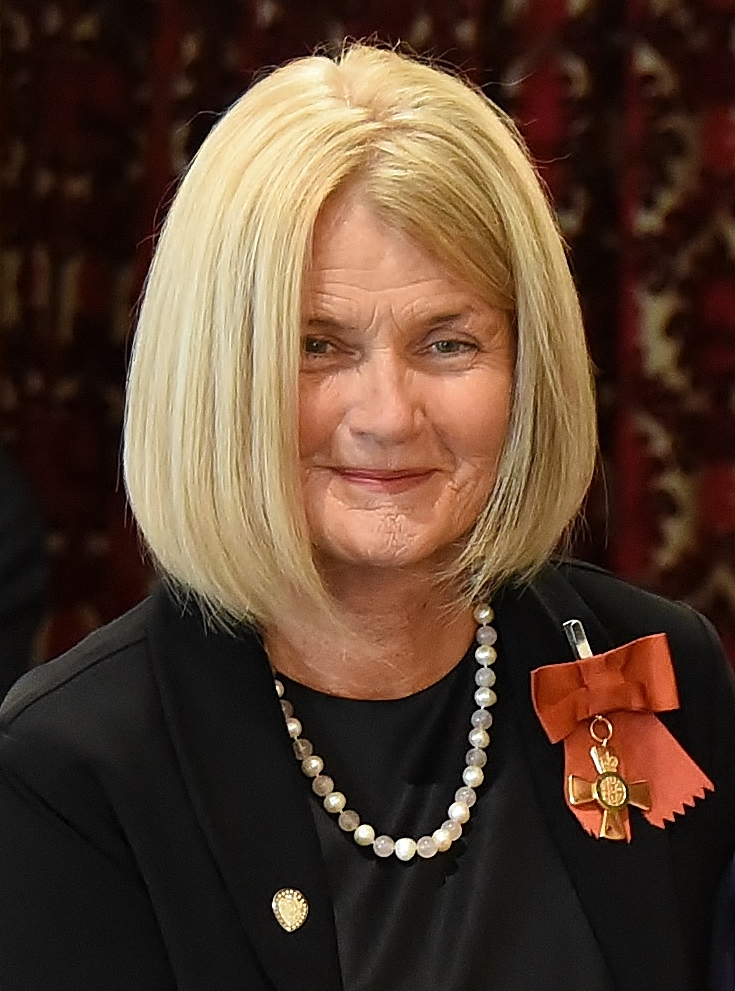
Lesley Murdoch

== British Empire Medal (BEM) ==
Military division

- Petty Officer Paul Cullen – Royal New Zealand Navy.
- Warrant Officer Class II Leslie John Janett – Royal New Zealand Corps of Transport.
- Staff Sergeant Lance Thomas Nicholas – Territorial Force, Royal New Zealand Infantry Regiment.
- Sergeant Christine Nancy Everitt – Royal New Zealand Air Force.

== Companion of the Queen's Service Order (QSO) ==
=== For community service ===
- Roger Leighton Hall – of Dunedin.
- Judith Leicester, Lady Hay – of Christchurch.
- The Reverend Father Peter Gwyn McCormack – of Palmerston North.
- Miss Edith Mayall (Sister Mary Catherine) – of Papatoetoe.
- Peter Amos Walden – of Papatoetoe.
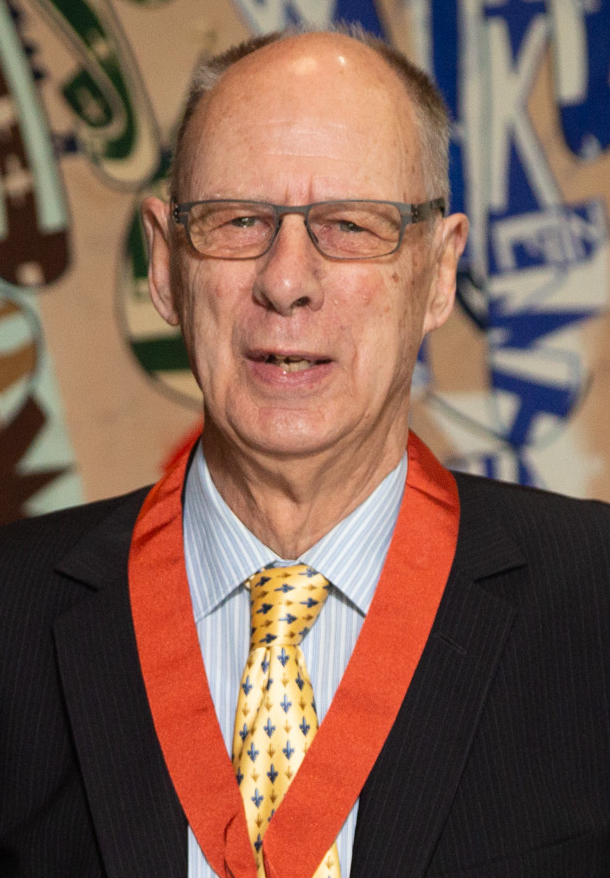
Roger Hall

=== For public services ===
- John Campbell Cator Bird – of Nelson.
- Wesley Raymond Cameron – of Wellington.
- John Edward Keaney – of Rotorua.
- Percy Hylton Craig Lucas – of Wellington; lately Director-General of Lands.
- Graydon Brian Nelson – of Wellington; private secretary to minister of the Crown.
- Dr Eric Mervyn Ojala – of Havelock North.
- Dr Charles Plummer Powles – of Waikanae Beach.
- Dr Anthony Trevelyan Rogers – of Hamilton.
- Joan Velvin – of Hastings.
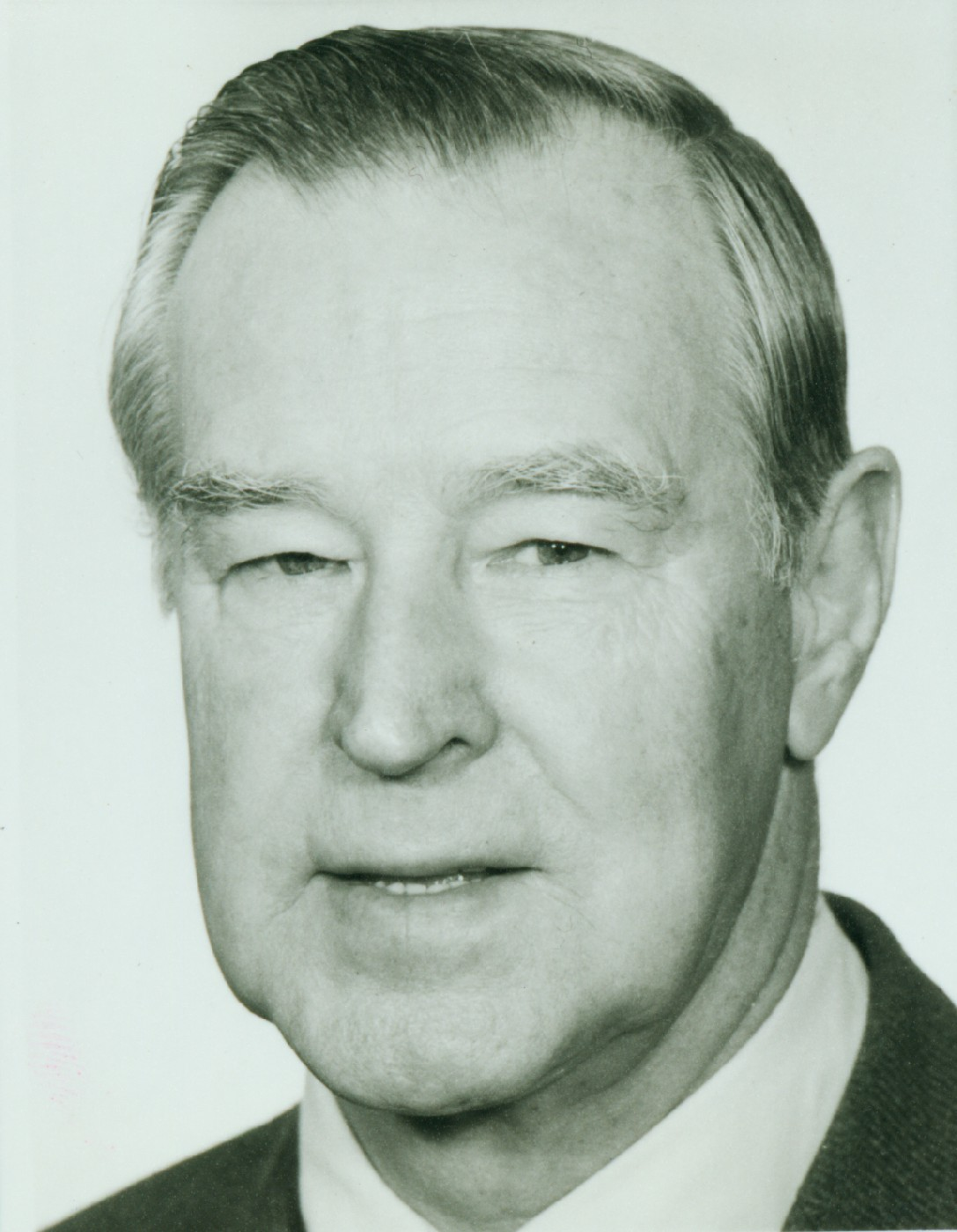
Eric Ojala

== Queen's Service Medal (QSM) ==
=== For community service ===
- Jean Matekitewhawhai Andrews – of Paekākāriki.
- Jean Myra Armstrong – of Whakatāne.
- Valda Margaret Bedingfield – of Wellington.
- Jean Beryl Bennett – of Wellington.
- Marie Grace Burman – of Auckland.
- Eileen Catherine Joyce Campbell (Joyce Cain) – of Auckland.
- Man Chung (James) Chiu – of Wellington.
- Betty Climo – of Napier.
- Margaret Joan Fage – of Hamilton.
- Edith Isabella Fitzpatrick – of Auckland.
- Charles Gaiger – of Wellington.
- Joyce Beryl Gaiger – of Wellington.
- Leslie William Graham JP – of Waihi.
- Lilly Valentine Joyce Gunn – of Palmerston North.
- Eugene Thomas Haddock – of Belfast.
- James Jeffrey Harley – of Whakatāne.
- Claude Karauria Hawea JP – of Te Hauke.
- Arnold John Heine – of Lower Hutt.
- Duncan Philip Heinz – of Nelson.
- John Lloyd – of Christchurch.
- Beryl Victoria Montgomerie – of Wanganui.
- Gordon Edward Munro – of Christchurch.
- Leo Frank James Shalders – of Christchurch.
- The Reverend Lagi Fatatoa Sipeli – of Wellington.
- William Harold Straw – of Christchurch.
- Ephraim Te Paa – of Ahipara.
- Barry Cecil Joh Turpin – of Christchurch.
- Taniwharau Te Hoemanuka Sonny Waru – of Rahotu.
- William Albert Whitehead – of Christchurch.
- Audrey Jean Willing – of Foxton.
- Dorothy Lena Louise Yarrall JP – of Hamilton.

=== For public services ===
- Elma Vivian Aitken JP – of Auckland.
- William Allan Apes – senior constable, New Zealand Police.
- Gavin Charles Apperley – of Auckland; constructive manager, HMNZ Dockyard, Ministry of Defence, Auckland.
- Rex Bennett JP – of Auckland.
- Colin Berquist – senior constable, New Zealand Police.
- Robert Gordon Brown – of Auckland.
- John Conway Butterfield – of Christchurch; traffic superintendent, Ministry of Transport, Christchurch.
- Henry Neil Chalklen – of Christchurch.
- Frederick Charles Chandler JP – of Auckland.
- Edric Theodore Cheer – of Woodville.
- Ruth Allison Coom JP – of Auckland.
- Wilhelmina Cruickshank – of Masterton.
- Kathleen Hemi – of Blenheim.
- Timothy Leigh Henderson – constable, New Zealand Police.
- Hylton Oliver Hensman – of Queenstown.
- Witchell Narsay Jaram – of Whakatāne; lately director, Department of Maori Affairs, Rotorua.
- Gerald Charles Leathem – of Auckland.
- Wilfred Ernest Lineham JP – of Karamea; chief fire officer, Karamea Volunteer Fire Brigade, New Zealand Fire Service.
- Lloyd Neil Matheson – senior constable, New Zealand Police
- Tini Milo Sio Meleisea – of Porirua.
- Mara Niumata JP – of Auckland.
- Andrew Grahame Paine JP – of Dunedin.
- George Pickering – of Dunedin.
- Margaret Evelyn Powell – of Omaio.
- Ronald Guy Powell – of Taumarunui.
- Fredreck Andrew George Rakich – of Auckland.
- Captain John Anthony Reedman – of Orewa.
- Muriel Stephens – of Dunedin.
- Patrick Francis Lloyd Stephenson JP – of Hamilton.
- Leo George Trott – of Auckland.
- Alice Elizabeth Van Gaalen JP – of Wainuiomata.
- Trevor Steadman Wilson – of Wellington.
- Arthur Lancelot (Joe) Wolfe – of Auckland.

== Queen's Fire Service Medal (QFSM) ==
- Russell James Kerr – station officer, Sumner Volunteer Fire Brigade, New Zealand Fire Service.
- Maxwell John Robinson – third officer, Carterton Fire Brigade, New Zealand Fire Service.
- Edward Peter Hartley Smith – fire commander and chief fire officer, Taupō Fire Brigade, New Zealand Fire Service.

== Queen's Police Medal (QPM) ==
- Gerard Conal Cunneen – detective chief inspector, New Zealand Police.

== Queen's Commendation for Valuable Service in the Air ==
- Flight Lieutenant Robert Howard – Royal New Zealand Air Force.
