= List of historic places in Hokitika =

List of heritage-registered places in Hokitika, New Zealand

This list of Heritage New Zealand-listed places in Hokitika contains those buildings and structures that are listed with Heritage New Zealand (formerly known as Historic Places Trust) in Hokitika, New Zealand.

Heritage New Zealand is a Crown entity and the national heritage agency. With a head office in Wellington, the Christchurch area office is responsible for the West Coast region, which includes Hokitika.

Image	Article	Type of structure	Street address	Built	Date listed	Heritage New Zealand listing	HNZ list no.
	Seddon Statue	statue	14 Sewell Street	1910	28 June 1990	Historic Place Category 1	4995
	Mahinapua Creek Railway Bridge	railway bridge	State Highway 6	1905	28 June 1990	Historic Place Category 1	5010
	Regent Theatre	cinema and theatre	23 Weld Street	1935	21 September 1989	Historic Place Category 2	5053
	Hungerford Mausoleum	mausoleum	Seaview Hill Road, Hokitika Public Cemetery		2 April 2004	Historic Place Category 2	1703
	Seaview Lighthouse	lighthouse	Seaview Terrace	1879	2 April 2004	Historic Place Category 2	1704
	Hokitika Customhouse	historic building	Gibson Quay	1897	28 June 1990	Historic Place Category 1	1700
	Okitiki Building	historic building	21 Hamilton Street	1908	21 September 1989	Historic Place Category 2	5050
	Totalisator Building	~~historic building~~	6 Dalton Street	1913	30 April 2010	Historic Place Category 1	~~9249~~
	Prestons Building	shop	95 Revell Street	1923	21 September 1989	Historic Place Category 2	5052
	Carnegie Building	historic Carnegie library	17 Hamilton Street and Tancred Street	1908	11 December 2003	Historic Place Category 2	1702
	Government Buildings/Courthouse	historic building	14 Sewell Street	1913	28 June 1990	Historic Place Category 2	5011
	Hokitika Clock Tower	memorial and clock tower	Sewell Street and Weld Street	1903	21 September 1989	Historic Place Category 2	5054
	St Andrew's United Church	church building	66 Hampden Street	1935	28 June 1990	Historic Place Category 1	5013
	All Saints' Church (Anglican)	church building	57 Bealey Street and Stafford Street	1936	28 June 1990	Historic Place Category 1	5012
	National Bank (Former)	former bank building	46 Revell Street	1939	21 September 1989	Historic Place Category 2	5057
	Hokitika Savings Bank Building (Former)	historic bank building	10 Hamilton Street	1927	21 September 1989	Historic Place Category 2	5051
	Bank of New Zealand (Former)	historic bank building	36 Revell Street and Camp Street	1931	21 September 1989	Historic Place Category 2	5055
	Bank of New South Wales (Former)	historic bank building	32–34 Revell Street and Camp Street	1905	21 September 1989	Historic Place Category 2	5056
	St Mary's Catholic Church	Catholic church	Sewell Street and Stafford Street	1914	2 April 2004	Historic Place Category 1	1705
