= Public Trust Building =

Public Trust Office Building
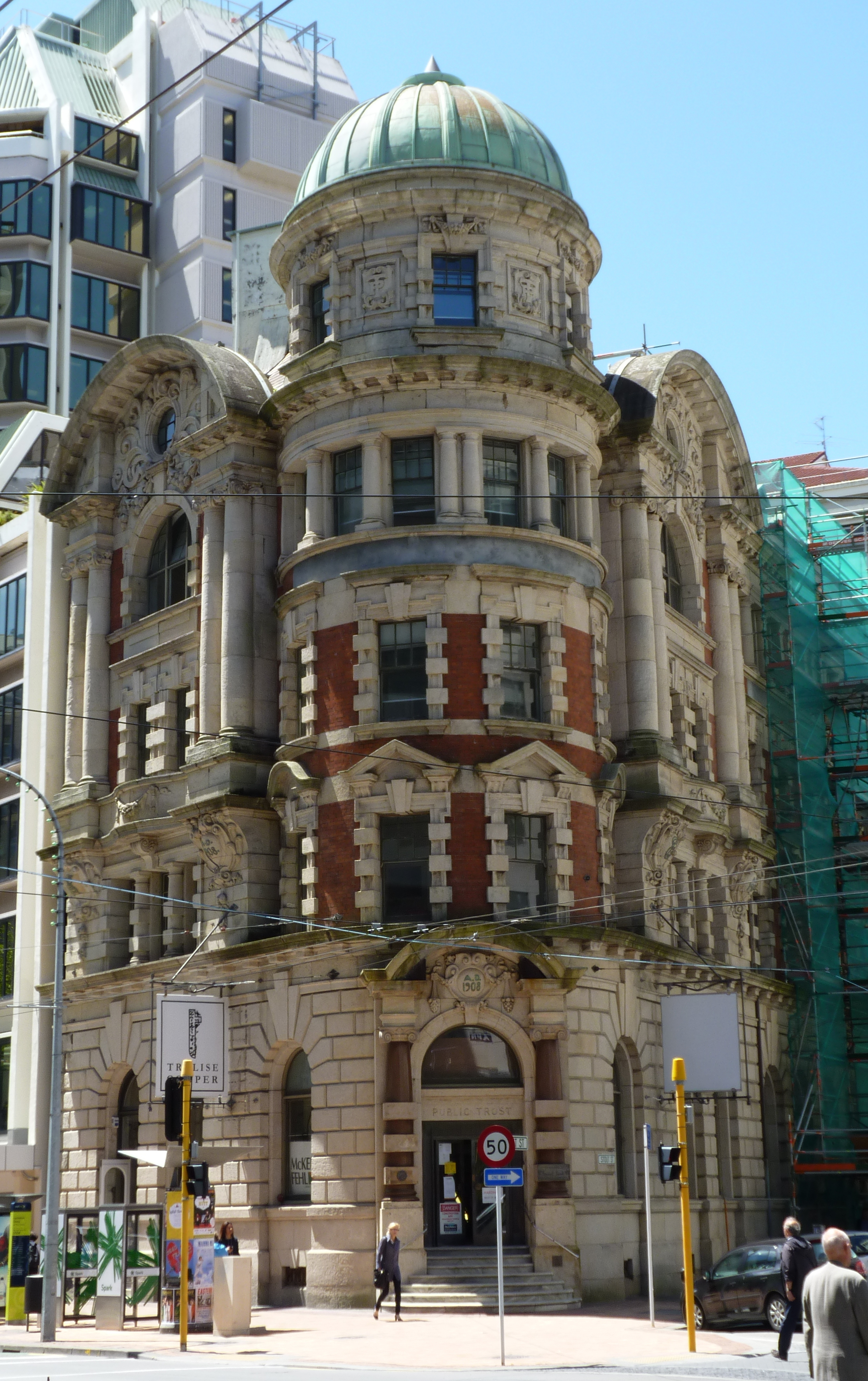
- The building in 2014

General information
- Architectural style: Edwardian Baroque
- Location: 41.28103°S 174.77636°E, 131-135 Lambton Quay and Stout Street, Wellington, New Zealand
- Current tenants: Ministry for Culture and Heritage
- Named for: New Zealand Public Trust
- Groundbreaking: 1905
- Topped-out: 1908
- Completed: 1909
- Opened: 9 June 1909
- Renovated: 2014-2015

Design and construction
- Architect: John Campbell

Heritage New Zealand – Category 1
- Designated: 26 November 1981
- Reference no.: 224

The Public Trust Office Building is an office building in central Wellington, New Zealand, completed in 1908. It is the only (surviving) building "made of a true New Zealand granite – from Tonga Bay in north-west Nelson." It is also believed to be New Zealand's first steel-framed office building.

== History ==
=== Design and construction ===
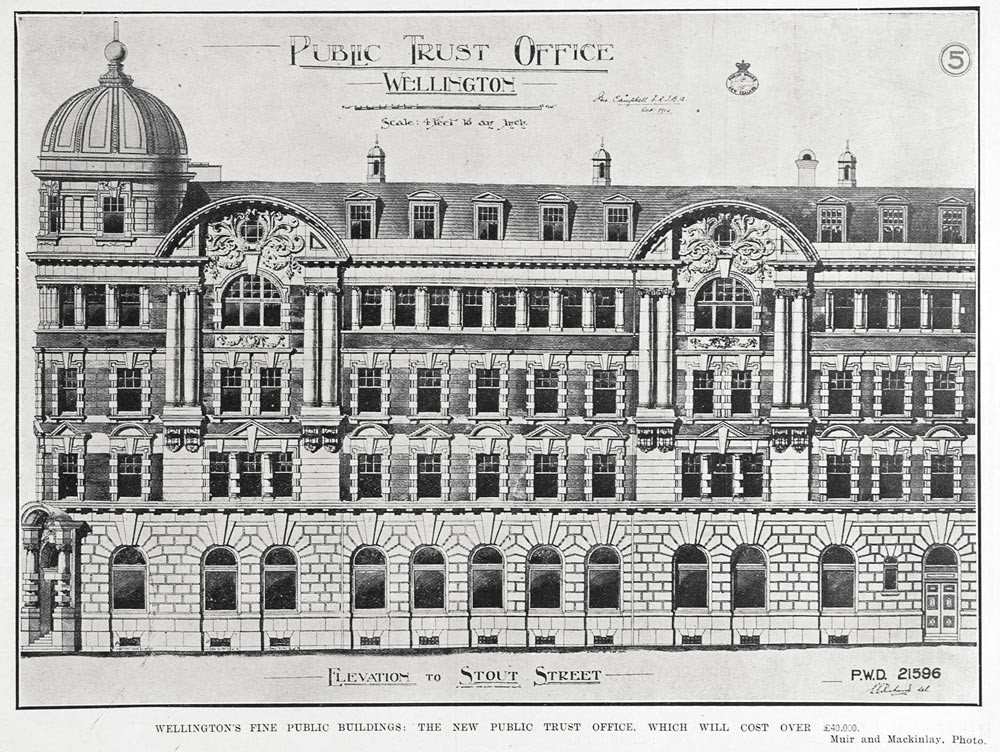
The plans for the building in the Auckland Weekly News in 1907

In 1894, Government Architect John Campbell was asked to start drafting plans for the building.

It was eventually opened by Prime Minister Sir Joseph Ward on 9 June 1909. The Minister in charge of the Public Trust, Āpirana Ngata, invited a number of Members of Parliament and Wellingtonians to the opening event. The event included a lunchtime banquet, concert, and dance in the evening. The cost was estimated to be £40,000.

=== Occupation by Public Trust and Creative NZ ===
The building was occupied by Public Trust from 1909 to 1982. In 1982, the Public Trust moved to a building next door.

Subsequently Creative New Zealand were the main occupiers of the building from 1985 to 2013.

In 1975 a public campaign successfully saved the building from demolition.

=== Period of vacancy and renovation ===
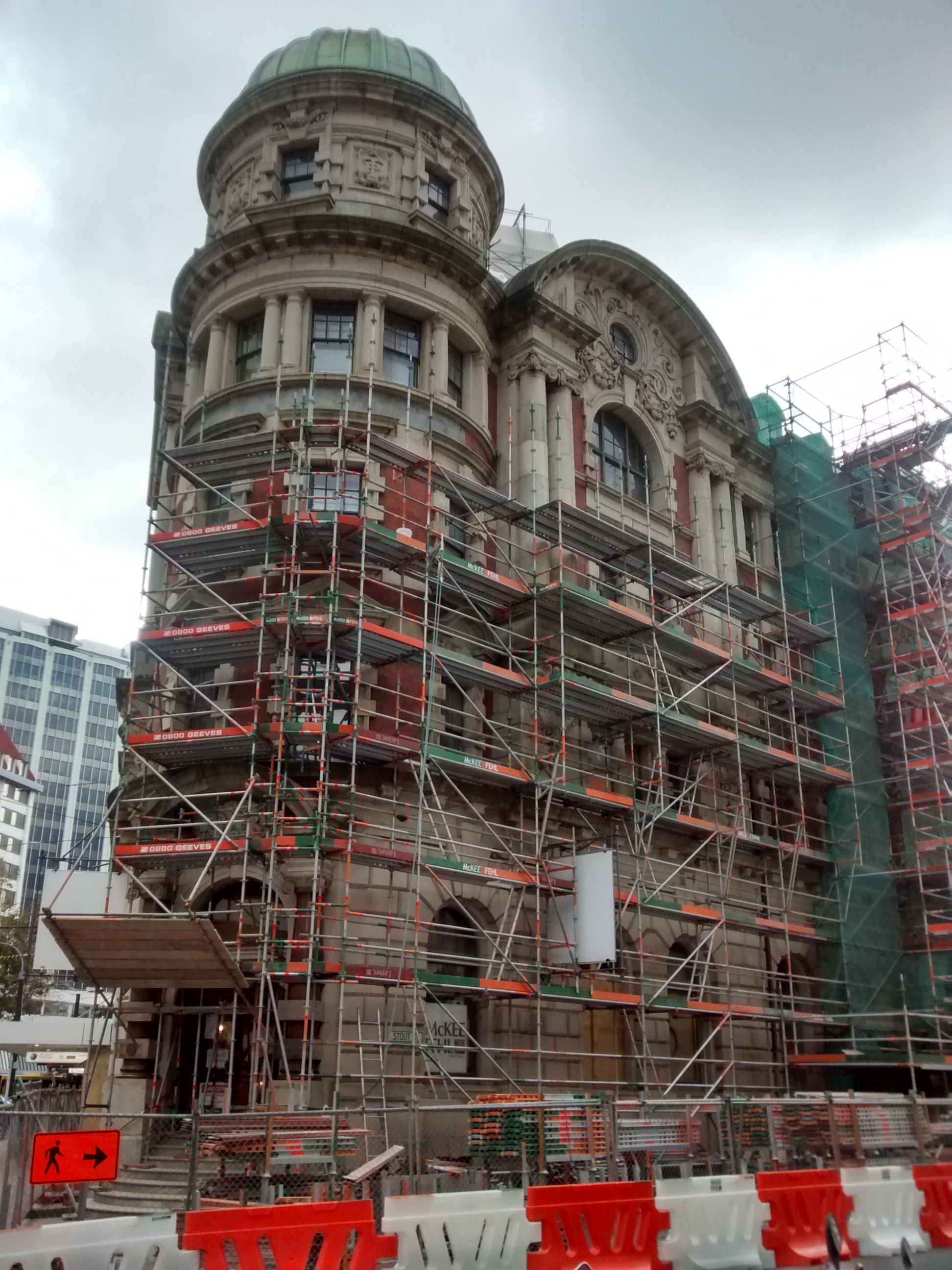
The Public Trust Building being renovated in May 2015

Doubts about the building's future were (again) raised following the 2013 Seddon earthquake. Most of the building's tenants were evacuated following the earthquake. Creative New Zealand's Wellington office had been in the building since 1985. After the building's body corporate (Creative New Zealand; Stout Street Chambers; Julian Parsons and Reedy Holdings) commissioned an assessment by engineering firm Dunning Thornton, they decided to sell the building to a party better placed to strengthen the building.

In 2013, Wellington City councillor Andy Foster said the Public Trust building was one of the heritage buildings he would most like to see strengthened and saved.

After it was largely evacuated, the building was bought by Maurice Clark, who was labelled a "hero" for taking on one of Wellington's largest heritage strengthening projects.

From 2014 to 2015, the building was renovated and earthquake strengthened. The restoration work was undertaken by Maurice Clark's construction firm McKee Fehl with architects Warren & Mahoney. The two companies also collaborated on the restoration of the now former Defence House across the road on Stout Street. In May 2016, the restoration won two awards at the New Zealand Institute of Architects Awards for 'Heritage' and 'Interior Architecture'.

=== Post-strengthening life ===
Following the strengthening of the building and its opening on 27 October 2015, the Ministry for Culture and Heritage has occupied most of the building.

A Jamie Oliver restaurant was also planned for the large downstairs room, but the venture did not proceed and alternative uses were sought. In October 2019 the large downstairs room was officially opened as an events venue called the Public Trust Hall, with capacity for 300 guests.

== Heritage status ==
The building is listed by Heritage New Zealand as a Category I Historic building. When the building was first listed by Heritage New Zealand, the citation said that:

This building is a superb example of a public and commercial building of the Edwardian period. Its corner site and powerful blend of architectural styles combine to create an outstanding piece of townscape. Chief Government Architect, John Campbell, was responsible for the design of this building which was erected in 1908. Historically the building's importance lies with its use as the Public Trust Office which when established in 1872 was the first of its type in the world.

The Wellington Architecture Centre describes the building as:

possibly the most architecturally elaborate façade in the capital – if not the entire country, and is without doubt in my mind, Government Architect John Campbell’s finest work outside of his design for Parliament House. It is, literally, our nation’s crowning glory.
