= Gray Nelson =

New Zealand public servant and diplomat (1927–2022)

Gray Nelson QSO
- Born: Graydon Brian Nelson; 8 May 1927
- Died: 29 November 2022 (aged 95)
- Occupations: Public servant; diplomat
- Spouse: Mary Butler O’Connell (m. 1956; died 2005)
- Children: 3

Graydon Brian Nelson QSO (8 May 1927 – 29 November 2022) was a New Zealand public servant and diplomat.

== Early life and family ==
Nelson spent his childhood in Taranaki, then the Auckland suburb of Epsom, and was educated at St Peter's College where he was a foundation pupil in 1939.

In 1956, Nelson married Mary Butler O’Connell, and the couple had three children.

== Career ==
Nelson began working in the Department of Lands and Survey in 1952 and later at Parliament, and was private secretary to five New Zealand prime ministers: Keith Holyoake, Jack Marshall, Norman Kirk, Bill Rowling, and Robert Muldoon. He also held the diplomatic position of counsellor at the New Zealand High Commission to the United Kingdom between 1978 and 1981. He was senior representative and life member of the Government Superannuitants Association and also a life member of Bellamy's.

In retirement, Nelson lived in Greytown. He died on 29 November 2022, aged 95, having been predeceased by his wife in 2005.

== Honours ==
In 1977, Nelson was awarded the Queen Elizabeth II Silver Jubilee Medal. In the 1987 New Year Honours, he was appointed a Companion of the Queen's Service Order for public services.
