= Departmental Building =

Historic building in Wellington, New Zealand

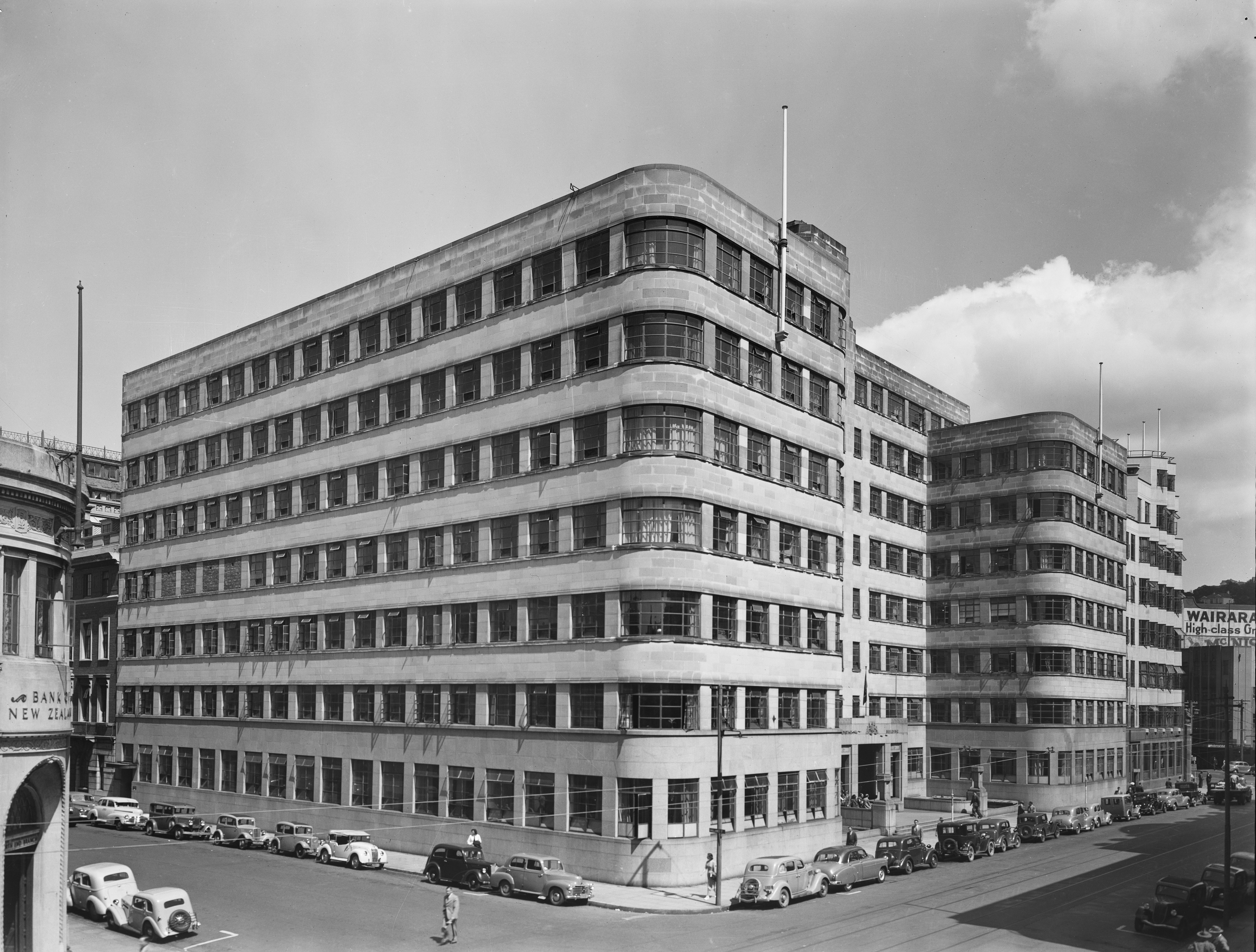
- Departmental Building, c. 1952
- Former names: Defence House

General information
- Architectural style: Art Deco
- Location: 15–21 Stout Street, Wellington
- Coordinates: 41.28130°S 174.77695°E
- Current tenants: Ministry of Business, Innovation and Employment
- Owner: Argosy Property Management

Technical details
- Floor count: 8
- Floor area: 21,000 square metres

Design and construction
- Architect: John Mair
- Main contractor: Fletcher Construction

Heritage New Zealand – Category 2
- Designated: 10 September 1981
- Reference no.: 1356

The Departmental Building (formerly Defence House), is a historic office building in Wellington, New Zealand. For many decades the building housed the New Zealand Defence Force and after a period of vacancy and subsequent extensive refurbishment, it is now occupied by the Ministry of Business, Innovation and Employment (MBIE).

The building is classified as a Category 2 Historic Place (places of "special or outstanding historical or cultural heritage significance or value") by Heritage New Zealand.

== History ==
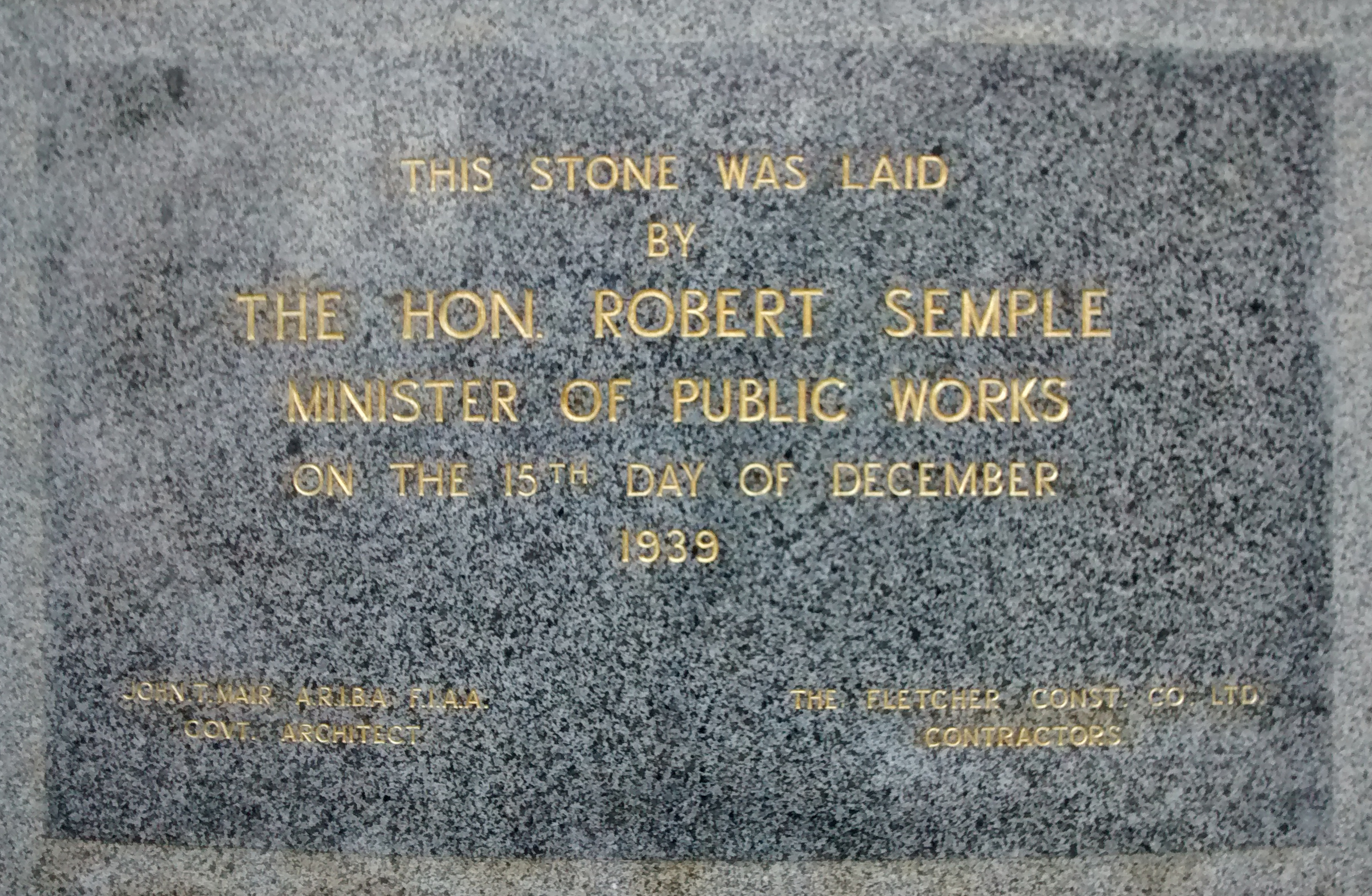
The foundation stone

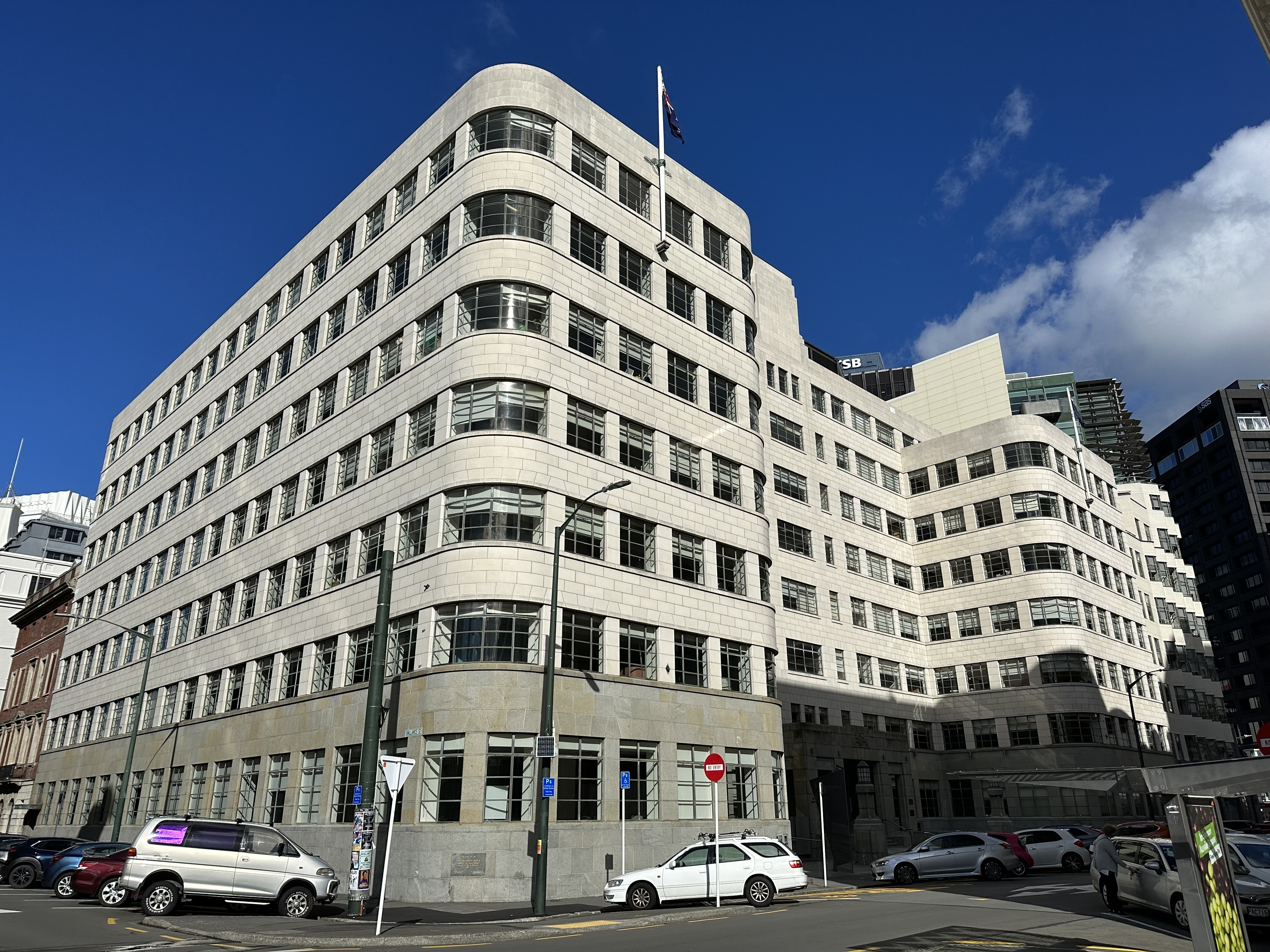
MBIE head office, 2023

=== Departmental Building ===
The Departmental Building was designed by Government Architect John Mair in 1935. Work started in late 1935 but was suspended in 1936 while additional land was bought and new plans drawn up. The foundations were completed in 1938. The main contractor was Fletcher Construction, with the steel framework erected by William Cable & Company. Construction was largely finished by 1940, although fitting-out was still being done in March 1942.

=== Defence House ===
In 2007, the New Zealand Defence Force moved out of the building after tenanting the building since its construction. The building was no longer fit-for-purpose, and according to the Defence Force: "Despite refurbishments the décor remained dull and dated and the building’s services were inefficient." The Defence Force flags were taken down on 23 February 2007 in a ceremony to close the building.

In December 2012, it was announced that the building would be bought by Argosy Property Management for $33.2 million. A 12-year tenancy agreement was signed between Argosy and the New Zealand Government in January 2013.

On 2 October 2019, the New Zealand Defence Force and other agencies moved into the Bowen State Building in Bowen Street, renaming it Defence House.

=== MBIE head office ===
In late 2014, about 2,000 Ministry of Business, Innovation and Employment employees moved from five Wellington buildings into the 15 Stout Street building. The relocation had a capital budget of over $18 million, but ultimately $16 million was spent. Operational expenditure on the move was $688,000. The costs involved with the refurbishment were controversial, including the almost $70,000 cost of the MBIE sign outside the building, and the $360,000 cost of office furniture ($1,800 per staff member).
