= Defence House =

Headquarters of the New Zealand Defence Force

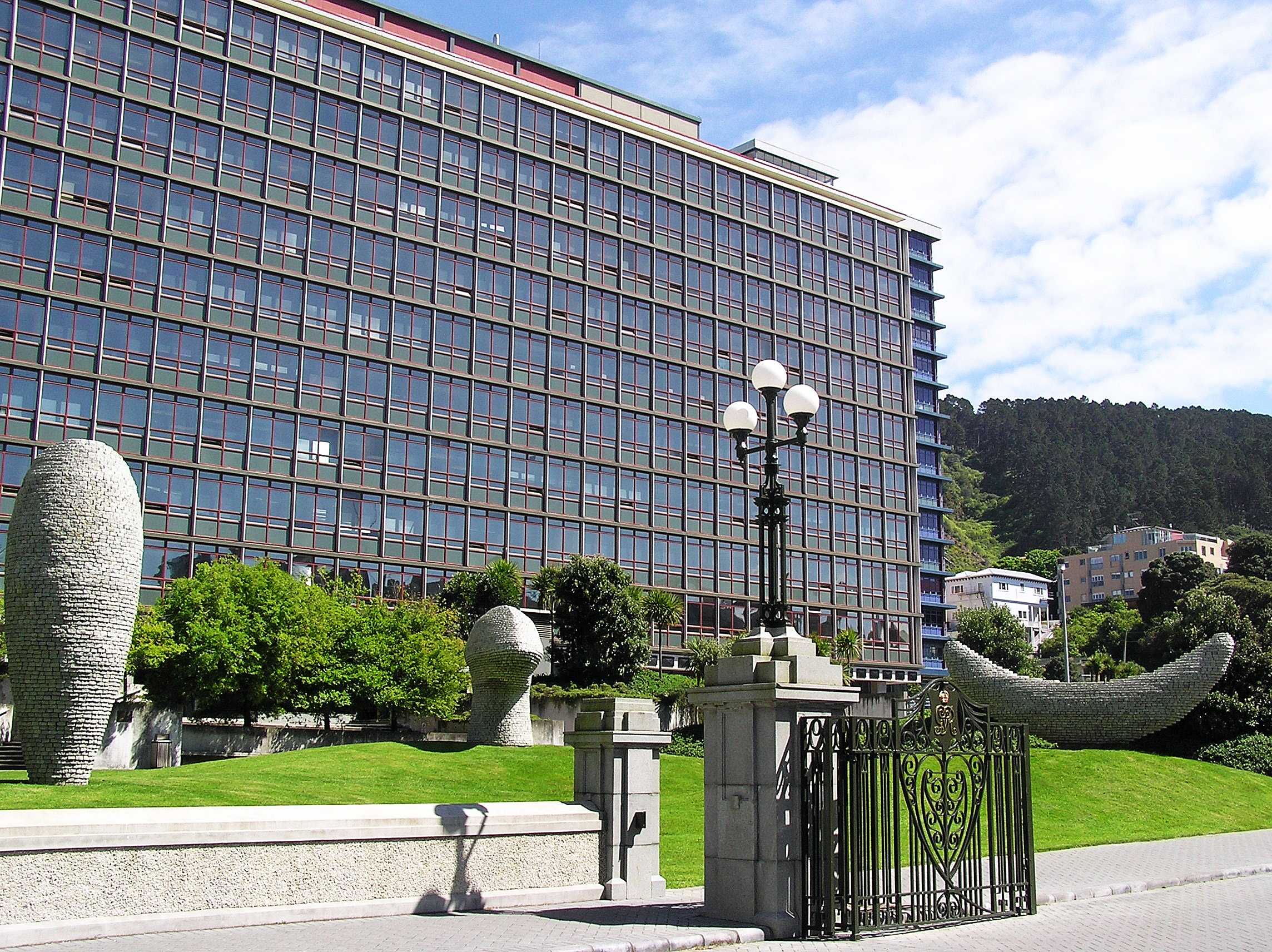
- Defence House (then Bowen State Building) in 2007
- Interactive map of the Defence House area
- Former names: Bowen State Building

General information
- Status: Completed
- Type: Government Building
- Architectural style: Modernist (pre-renovation)
- Location: 34 Bowen Street, Wellington
- Coordinates: 41.2782°S 174.7748°E
- Current tenants: New Zealand Defence Force
- Construction started: 1958
- Completed: 1961
- Inaugurated: 1962
- Renovated: 2016-2019
- Owner: Precinct Properties

Technical details
- Floor count: 12 (2 underground)

Design and construction
- Architect: Gordon Wilson
- Developer: Ministry of Works

Renovating team
- Architect: Warren and Mahoney
- Renovating firm: LT McGuinness

Website
- Official Page

Defence House (formerly the Bowen State Building) is the headquarters of the New Zealand Defence Force and Ministry of Defence, located in Bowen Street, Wellington. It should not be confused with Bowen House (now known as Te Iho) also in Bowen Street.

== History ==
Designed in the 1950s by architects Ian Reynolds and Jock Beere under the supervision of Government Architect Gordon Wilson for the Ministry of Works, construction began in 1958 and the building was competed in 1961. It was named the Bowen State Building due to its location in Bowen Street and to commemorate George Bowen, a former Governor of New Zealand. The building had 10 storeys and a penthouse and cost £1 million. It was officially opened on 7 November 1961 by Prime Minister Keith Holyoake. A feature of the new building was its large staff cafeteria for serving lunches. The cafeteria level was also the base for 'tea ladies' who each morning and afternoon would take four-decker steel tea trolleys, each capable of serving 100 cups of tea, to workers throughout the building.

From 1962 until the Ministry of Social Development moved out in 2016 the building housed a variety of different government agencies. Following the building's acquisition in 2012 as part of the purchase of several Bowen Campus buildings by Precinct Properties (then ANZO) for NZ$50,400,000, Precinct began a NZ$203,000,000 refurbishment of the building in November 2016.

In August 2017 it was reported that once renovated, the building would house the New Zealand Defence Force, Ministry of Defence, the Government Communications Security Bureau (GCSB), the New Zealand Security Intelligence Service (NZSIS) and the Department of Prime Minister and Cabinet (DPMC). In late 2016, during the building's redevelopment, a time capsule was discovered buried in the walls of the building.

On 2 October 2019, the New Zealand Defence Force and other agencies moved into the Bowen State Building, renaming it Defence House.

The refurbished building won the award for 'Commercial Architecture' in the 2020 New Zealand Institute of Architects' Wellington regional awards. The Institute of Architects stated that the renovation and extension by architects Warren and Mahoney was "a fine example of sustainability in action". The architects had adapted a Brutalist Modernist building into a modern government workplace while respecting "the muscular form of the original building".

== See also ==
- New Zealand Defence Force
- Ministry of Defence
- Departmental Building, building formerly known as Defence House
