= Waitomo Caves Hotel =

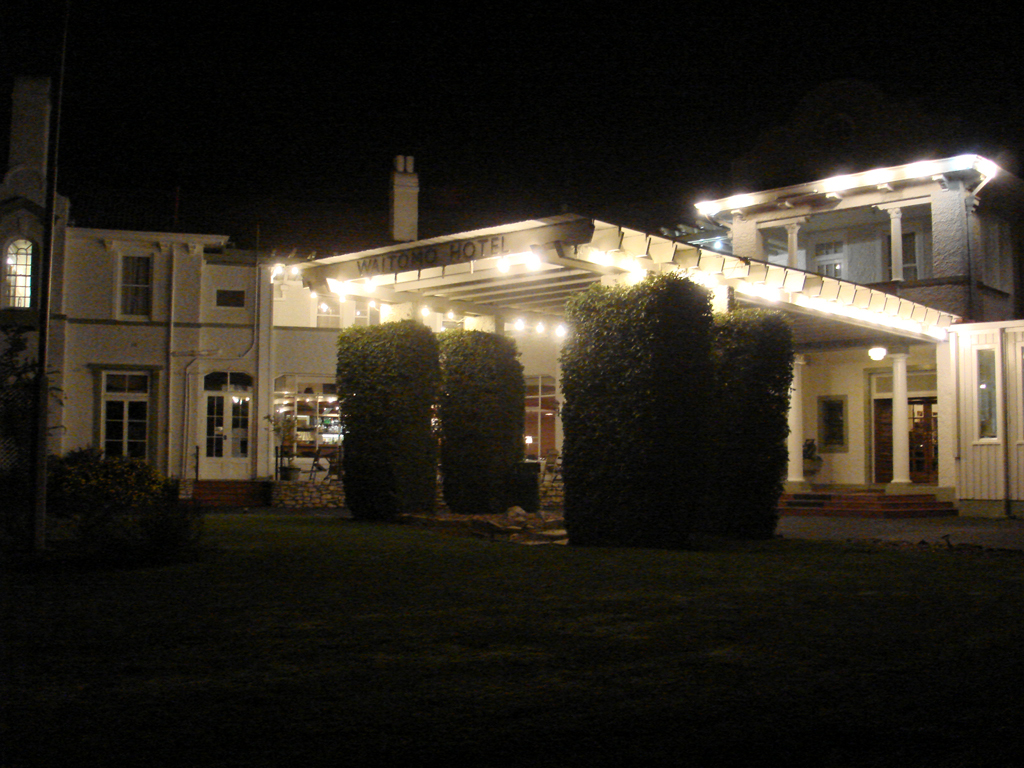
- Waitomo Hotel
- Former names: Waitomo House, Government Hostel at Waitomo

General information
- Type: Hotel
- Architectural style: Victorian
- Location: 27D Waitomo Village Road and Access Road, Waitomo Caves, Waitomo, New Zealand
- Coordinates: 38.26103°S 175.10658°E
- Construction started: 1908
- Renovated: 1928

Waitomo Caves Hotel (originally called Waitomo House and later Government Hostel at Waitomo) is a historic hotel built in 1908 that is located in Waitomo District, King Country above Waitomo Caves in New Zealand. The hotel initially had only six bedrooms, and was later expanded in 1927–1928 with the addition of 24 more rooms, along with a new kitchen and dining room. The building is famous for its unique style of New Zealand Victorian. Some claim that the hotel is haunted.

== History ==
=== Background ===
In response to the increasing numbers of tourists that began visiting the Waitomo Caves in the late nineteenth century early cave explorer and tour guide Tāne Tinorau Opataia together with his wife constructed a house in 1901 when they converted to provide tourist accommodation in 1904 calling it Waitomo House. In that same year the Government nationalised the caves using the Public Works Act.

In 1905 the Tourist and Health Resorts Department purchased Waitomo House and its success under their ownership persuaded them to commission a more modern replacement from the Public Works Department. The building was designed by John Campbell who at the time was the architect-in-charge of the Public Buildings Division of the Public Works Department.

=== Construction and development ===
Despite being designed during the Edwardian period Campbell looked back to the previous century for influence designing a two-storeyed shiplap weatherboard asymmetric building with none of the four facades the same. On two facades it had continuous verandas on both the ground and first floor levels. There was a two-storeyed bay window on the rounded corner. The bay is continued beyond the corrugated iron roof to form an impressive octagonal turret which has an eight-sided pavilion roof. Multiple chimneys puncture the roof.

Despite its apparent size the hotel only had six guest bedrooms. The other rooms were an office/reception, kitchen, dining room and staff rooms. Tents were however available to accommodate more guests (though these may not have very comfortable on cold winter nights). The timber used in its construction was transported into the area on horse-drawn carts. As it was remote from town water and power supplies water was pumped from the Waitomo Stream and fed back up the slope to the hotel, while electricity was generated by a dynamo powered by a petrol driven motor engine. Completed in 1909, the building which is positioned on an escarpment overlooking the village was originally called the "Government Hostel at Waitomo" and is today known as "The Victorian Wing".

=== Extension ===
By the mid-1920s the hotel was proving to be too small to accommodate the increasing number of visitors to the Waitomo caves. As a result, it was enlarged between 1927 and 1928 by adding a two-storeyed plastered reinforced concrete tiled roof extension which is now called the "Art Deco Wing". This extension was designed by the Government Architect John Mair. In line with the Art Deco style of the period Mair incorporated architectural influences from many sources with the thick concrete walls, decks and patios being in the Spanish Mission style of the Spanish missionary settlements in California while the concrete pillars and facades are in the Cape Dutch style often seen in South Africa. The result was in sharp contrast with the earlier building.

As well as a large kitchen and dining room the extension added another 24 bedrooms to the hotel which allowed the hotel to accommodate up to one hundred guests. None of the new rooms had bathrooms and most were very small.

=== Change of ownership ===
Ownership passed to the Tanetinorau Opatai Trust in the 1980s as part of a Waitangi Treaty settlement.

The trust subsequently leased the hotel to the Taharoa Tourism management group which markets the hotel as part of its Wellesley Hotels and Resorts portfolio.

By 2012 the hotel was due for a planned $3.5 million refurbishment with approximately 20 of the hotel's 45 rooms not up to a suitable occupancy standard, which was contributing to tourists staying in Rotorua rather than in Waitomo. However the Tanetinorau Opatai Trust, was not in a position to fund the work as it had not received any income for seven years from its 51% share of the Waitomo Caves tourism operation. This was due to a long-running dispute between the descendants of Tane Tinorau Opataia which put distribution of the revenue to the trust on hold while the dispute was heard in the Maori Land Court, before being referred to the Maori Appellate Court. Despite the case, funding of a refurbishment began in June 2014. The case was resolved in favour of the trust in 2015, which freed up eight years of accumulated revenue.

=== Registration as a historic place ===
Because the hotel represents the work of two different eras of Government architecture and is a fine example of the respective styles of its two architects it was registered under the Historic Places Act 1980 as a Category 2 Historic Place on 28 June 1990.

== Claimed hauntings ==
According to stuff.co.nz, Waitomo Caves Hotel is the fourth most haunted spot, and the most haunted hotel, in New Zealand. There have been claims of bathtubs dripping blood, orbs bouncing around the driveway and a Māori princess stalking the corridors. Some people have also reported experiencing the dining room going cold, laughter, the feeling of 'something' walking through them and the noise of a maid's trolley going along the long stretch of hall in the lower part of the hotel.

It has been reported by hotel staff and guests that a ghost likes to play tricks on them or that apparitions have been seen in the dining room, along with an uneasy feeling in the atmosphere. It has also been reported that some rooms have moving lights, objects and even screams.

In 2011, it was reported in the Waikato Times that a paranormal investigator for The Quantum Foundation, a Waikato-based research group, claimed to have had a time slip experience – an alleged paranormal phenomenon in which a person, or group of people, travel through time via unknown means – at the Waitomo Caves Hotel. In March 2012, a team of paranormal investigators from Haunted Auckland and Strange Occurrences performed an overnight investigation of the hotel, however their findings were inconclusive.

=== Media appearances ===
In late 2001, a television program called Hauntings screened on New Zealand's TV2 featuring an episode involving the Waitomo Caves Hotel. In 2006, Waitomo Caves Hotel was featured on an episode of Ghost Hunt, a New Zealand television show.

Director Guillermo del Toro claimed to have encountered a ghost when he stayed a night at the hotel. The hotel was the single biggest inspiration for his 2015 film Crimson Peak.
