= 1997 Niue Common Roll by-election =

← 1996	15 February 1997	1999 →

One common roll seat
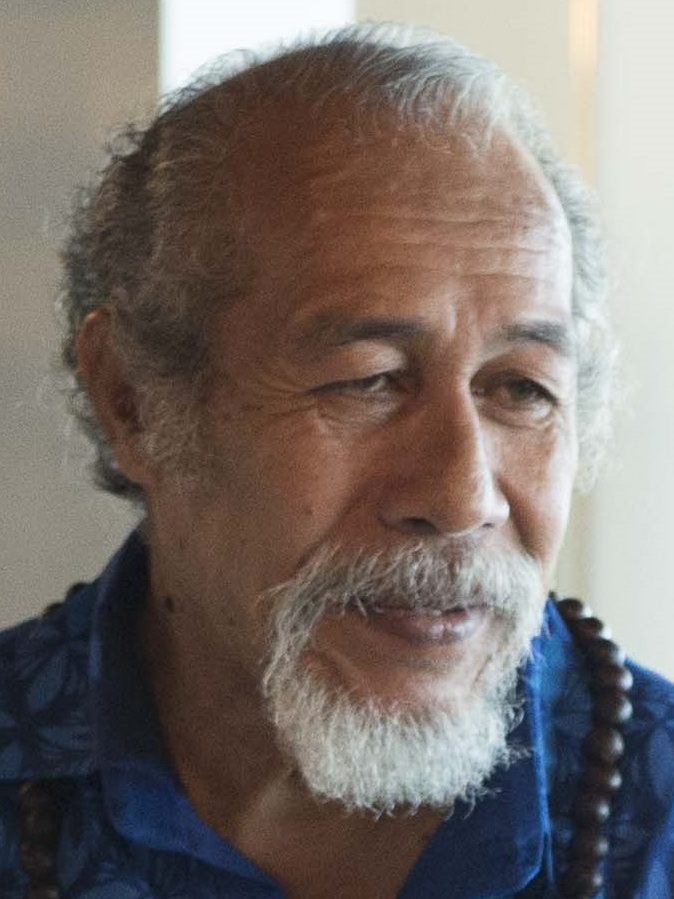
	First party	Second party	Third party
		NPP	NPP
Candidate	Billy Talagi	Tiva Tongatule	Terry Magaoa Chapman
Party	Independent	Niue People's	Niue People's
Popular vote	275	194	90
Percentage	49.19%	34.70%	16.10%
MP before election
Toeono Tongatule
Niue People's
Elected MP
Billy Talagi
Independent

The 1997 Niue Common Roll by-election was held on February 15, 1997, to fill a vacant common roll seat in the Niue Assembly after the death of Toeono Tongatule. The seat was won by independent Billy Talagi, a former member of the Niue People's Party that defeated Toeono Tongatule's late wife, Tiva Tongatule, and Terry Magaoa Chapman.

== Results ==
Candidate	Party	Votes	%
Billy Talagi	Independent	275	49.19
Tiva Tongatule	Niue People's Party	194	34.70
Terry Magaoa Chapman	Niue People's Party	90	16.10
Total		559	100.00
