= Toeono Tongatule =

Niuean politician

Member of the Niuean Parliament for Common Roll
- Succeeded by: Billy Talagi

Personal details
- Died: October 1996
- Party: Niue People's Party
- Spouse: Tiva Tongatule

Toeono Tongatule (died October 1996) was a Niuean politician who served in the Niue Assembly until his death in October 1996. Tongatule was a member of the Niue People's Party. The 1997 Niue Common Roll by-election was held to fill Tongatule's vacant seat after his death. Billy Talagi won the seat over Terry Magaoa Chapman and Tongatule's widow, Tiva Tongatule, who ran for the seat as part of the Niue People's Party.
