= Statue of Richard Seddon, Hokitika =

Statue in Hokitika, New Zealand

Statue of Richard Seddon
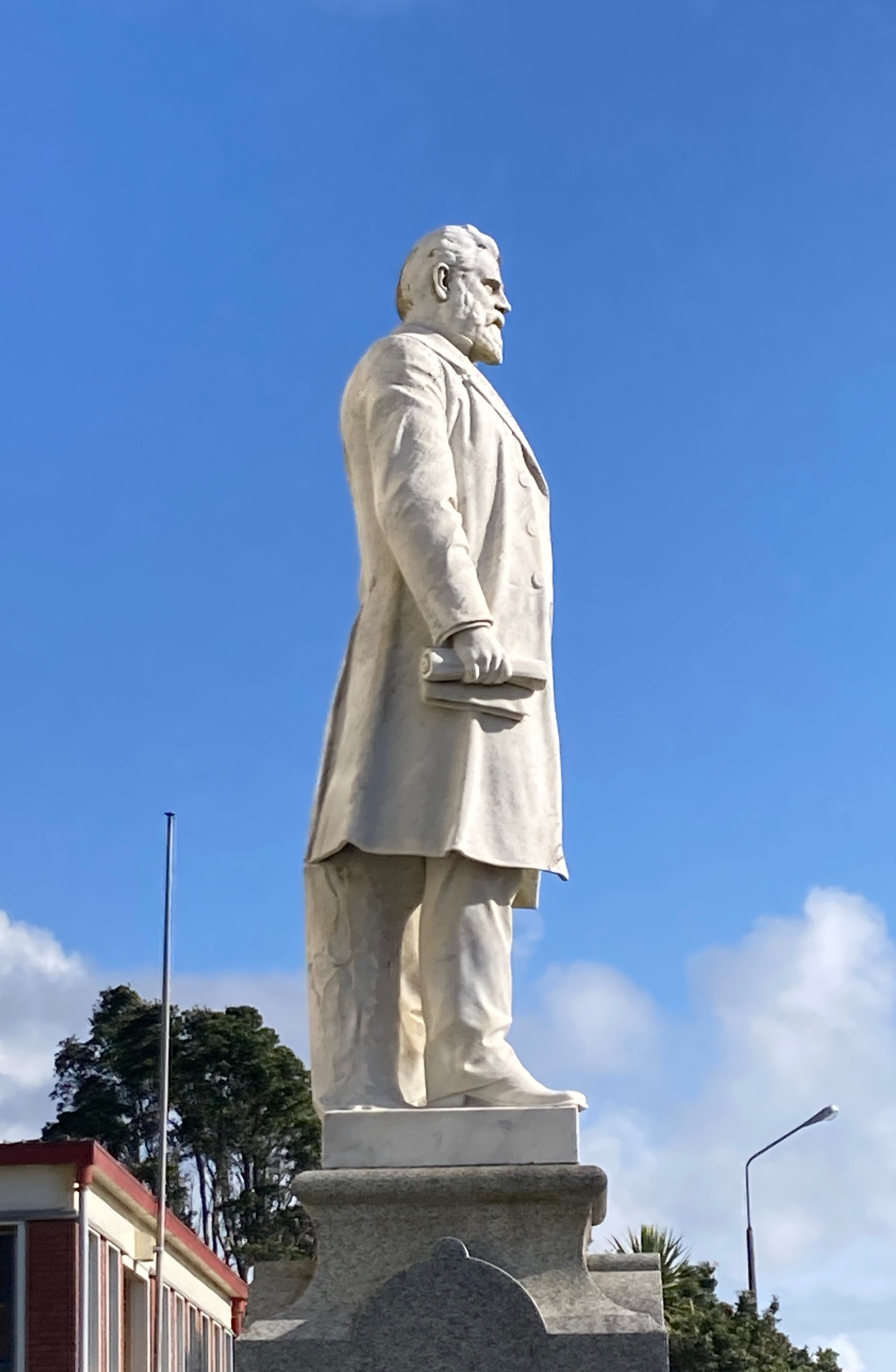
- Statue of Richard Seddon, outside Hokitika Government Buildings

- Artist: William Parkinson
- Completion date: 25 May 1910
- Subject: Richard Seddon
- Designation: Category II historic place
- Location: Hokitika
- 42°43′09″S 170°57′47″E

Heritage New Zealand – Category 2
- Designated: 28 June 1990
- Reference no.: 4995

This statue of Richard Seddon is in Hokitika, on the West Coast of the South Island of New Zealand. The statue is situated on Sewell Street, outside the Government Buildings known as Seddon House.

== History ==
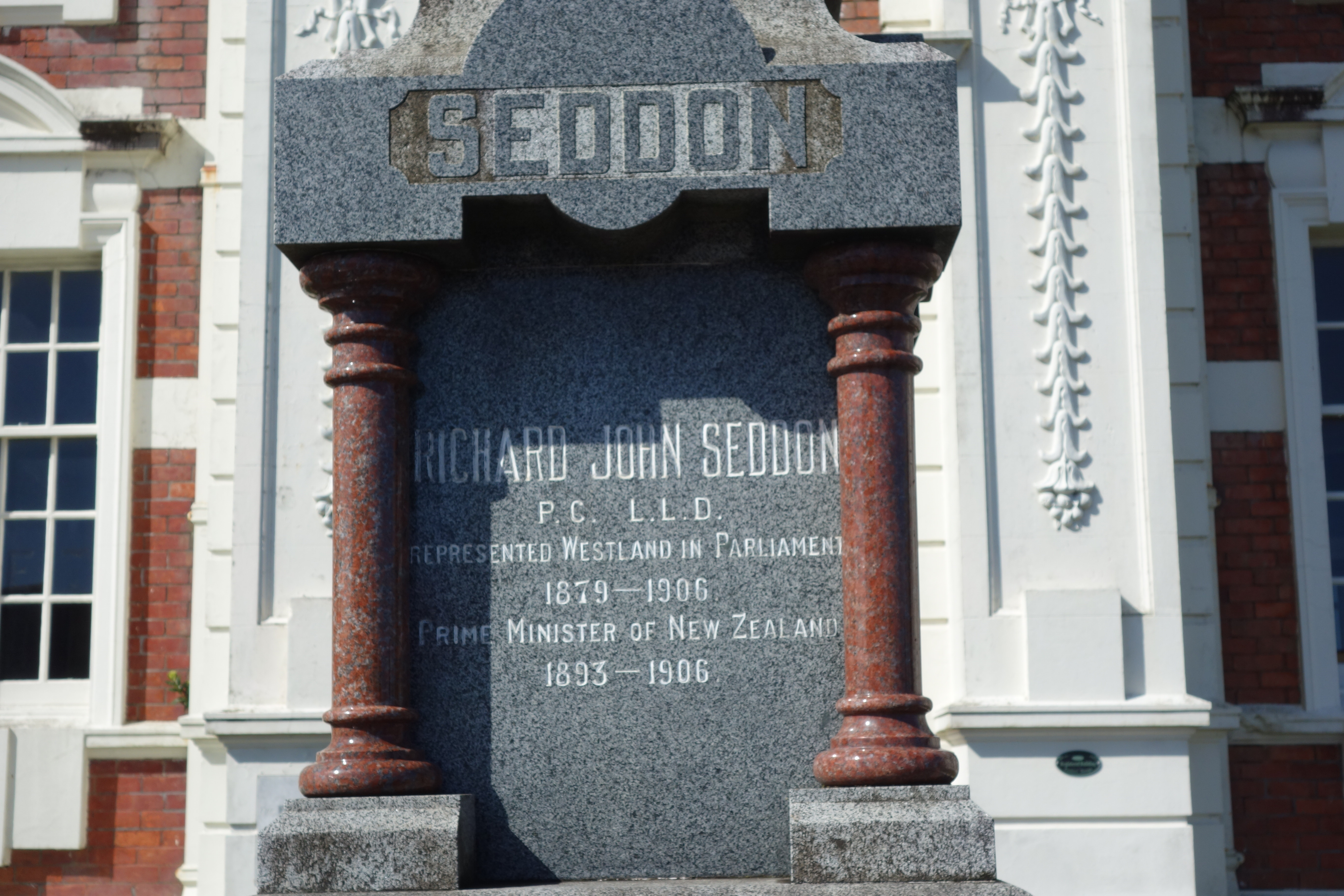
Inscription below the plinth

Richard Seddon, known as "King Dick", was born in England, and arrived in Hokitika in 1866, via Australia, to work the goldfields. After opening a store, Seddon then expanded his business to include the sale of alcohol and became a publican. His involvement with politics began with local boards, and then the local council, before becoming mayor of Kumara in 1874, and successfully running for Parliament in 1879.

Seddon was Premier of New Zealand from 1893, and died in office in 1906. Two years later, the Seddon Memorial Committee in Hokitika proposed to the Hokitika Borough council to erect a statue in his honour. Funds of £580 were raised through public subscription, and William Parkinson (of W. Parkinson & Co, Monumental Masons) of Auckland commissioned to produce the statue. Unusually for the time, the statue was produced in New Zealand, rather than overseas. Parkinson had previously, in 1902–03, designed and built the Hokitika Clock Tower to great public satisfaction.

The Government Buildings then being designed by the Government Architect John Campbell were set back 20 feet (6.1 m) to allow room for the statue.

On 25 May 1910, the statue was unveiled outside the Government Buildings in Hokitika. Thomas Joseph Mcguigan as chair of the memorial committee spoke first. The main speaker was Joseph Ward, the premier who had succeeded Seddon. Henry Michel, the mayor of Hokitika, spoke next and accepted the statue to be taken care of by Hokitika Borough. Tom Seddon, who had succeeded his father as representative of the Westland electorate, was the last speaker and, on behalf of his family, he thanked the people of Westland for their generosity of having fundraised for the statue. The inscription below the plinth reads:

Richard John Seddon / P.C. L.L.D / Represented Westland in Parliament 1879–1906 / Prime Minister of New Zealand 1893–1906

Wreaths were laid on the thirtieth anniversary of Seddon's death.

== Ownership ==
The Government Buildings and statue were both advertised for sale in 1993, which attracted national attention, and led to the continued public ownership of the statue. Despite a proposal to move the statue to another location in Hokitika in 1994, the statue remains in its original site.

The statue was registered by the New Zealand Historic Places Trust as a Category I item in June 1990, with registration number 4995.

== Significance ==
There are around six monuments erected to Seddon throughout New Zealand, but only two of them, this one, and the one by Sir Thomas Brock outside Parliament House, Wellington, resemble the man himself. According to the Historic Places Trust, the Hokitika statue is "a fine example of the realistic style of sculpture developed in Victorian times".
