= 2001 Niue Common Roll by-election =

The 2001 Niue Common Roll by-election was held in April 2001 to fill a vacant common roll seat in the Niue Assembly after assembly member Hima Douglas resigned to take an appointment as the Niue High Commission. Independent politician Hunuki Hunukitama won the election over an opponent in the Niue People's Party.
