= Krypton Okesene =

Niue politician

Member of Niue Assembly
- In office July 2003 – ?
- Preceded by: Hunuki Hunukitama
- Succeeded by: ?

Krypton Okesene is a Niuean politician who was elected to a common roll seat in the Niue Assembly in the 2003 Niue Common Roll by-election that was held after the death of Hunuki Hunukitama. Okesene is a retired medical technician from Tuapa.
