= John Campbell (architect) =

Scottish architect in New Zealand (1857–1942)

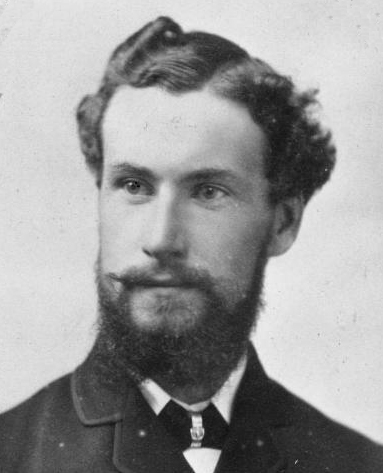
- Campbell c. 1892
- Born: 4 July 1857; Glasgow, Scotland
- Died: 4 August 1942 (aged 85); Wellington, New Zealand
- Occupation: Architect
- Spouse: Mary Jane Marchbanks (m. 1889)
- Parent(s): Janet and Donald Campbell
- Buildings: Dunedin Law Courts; Wellington Public Trust Building, Parliament House

John Campbell (4 July 1857 – 4 August 1942) was a New Zealand architect, responsible for many government buildings in New Zealand, among them the Dunedin Law Courts, the Public Trust Building in Wellington, and Parliament House. From 1909 until his retirement in 1922 he held the position of government architect.

== Early life and education ==
Campbell was born on 4 July 1857 in Glasgow, Scotland to Janet (née McKechnie) and Donald Campbell, a ship's chandler. He was educated first at the Haldane Academy and then the Glasgow School of Art.

== Career ==
After leaving school Campbell undertook an apprenticeship between 1872 and 1876 with architect John Gordon. Upon completion of his apprenticeship he remained with the firm as an assistant draughtsman until leaving Gordon's practice in 1880. He subsequently emigrated to New Zealand in 1882.

=== Enters New Zealand government service ===
After arriving in New Zealand, he worked for the firm of Mason and Wales for a short time before in 1883 taking up a temporary position as an architectural draughtsman in the Dunedin office of the Public Works Department. His first known work was an unbuilt design from the mid-1880s for the Dunedin railway station. The earliest buildings constructed to his design, were predominantly Queen Anne in style and included the Porirua Lunatic Asylum (1894) and the Dunedin Prison (1895–98) which was reminiscent of Norman Shaw's New Scotland Yard in London. Since the sudden death of William Clayton in 1877 his position of Colonial Architect had not been filled. Instead his Chief Draughtsman Pierre Finch Martineau Burrows had undertaken responsibility for the design of government buildings until he was let go in a cost saving measure in 1884, which downsized the government's architectural section. Despite this Campbell stayed on in government service.

=== Transfers to Wellington ===
In 1888, Campbell was transferred to Wellington and in 1889, he was appointed to the position of draughtsman-in-charge in the newly created Public Buildings Department. Campbell's appointment effectively gave him responsibility for a staff of up to 10 who between them undertook the design of all government buildings in New Zealand. Notable among them were William Crighton (1861–1928), Llewelyn Richards (1865–1945) and Claude Paton (1881–1953). The Public Buildings Department subsequently merged with the Public Works Department (PWD) in 1890 with Campbell retaining his responsibility. His pragmatic professionalism contributed to establishing architects as an important part of the PWD. For much of his career, Campbell worked for the Liberal Government (1891–1912), designing the buildings needed to support an administration which was committed to wide-ranging social and economic reforms. His design for the Dunedin Law Courts building which was completed in 1902 was an adaptation of an earlier design for a railway station whose plan is a precursor of Campbell's later design for the Parliament House in Wellington.

As his career progressed his designs were increasingly Edwardian Baroque, a style he successfully established as the official architectural style for government buildings (such as police stations, courthouses and post offices) in New Zealand in the early twentieth century. Among them were buildings as diverse in function as the Magistrate's Court, Wellington (1901–3), the Napier Government Buildings (1902–7) and the Public Trust Office, Wellington (1905–9). His office was responsible for design and construction of a large number of post offices between about 1900 and 1914. Among them were the similar Auckland and Wellington chief post offices. For the smaller post offices two designs were widely reproduced across the country. The Government Buildings in Hokitika, designed by Campbell in two stages, in 1907 and 1911, are a more restrained expression of his characteristic Imperial Baroque style. The crowning achievement of Campbell's career was winning the commission in 1911 (following a nation-wide architectural competition) to design Parliament House in Wellington. At the time of its construction it was the most ambitious architectural project attempted in New Zealand.

=== Appointed architect ===
Campbell's position was changed to that of “Architect” in 1899. In 1905 Campbell was elected a fellow of both the New Zealand Institute of Architects and the Royal institute of British Architects. He was given the title of “Government Architect” in 1909 and held it until his retirement. He was the first to hold this title. He was succeeded as Government Architect by John Mair. Campbell assisted in the founding of the first Architectural Students Association in Wellington.

=== Retirement ===
Upon his retirement in 1922 he was succeeded by John Mair as Government Architect. Following his retirement Campbell travelled extensively. John Campbell died in Wellington on 4 August 1942 and is buried in Karori Cemetery.

== Personal life ==
Campbell was married by the Rev. David M. Stuart, to Mary Jane Marchbanks, the second daughter of David Marchbanks on 18 April 1889 at Queen Street north in Dunedin. It appears that the couple had no children. For many years he was a member of the board of management of St. John's Presbyterian Church.

His wife, Mary Jane Campbell, died in 1950.

== Works ==
Among the buildings which Campbell personally designed, collaborated on or supervised the design of are:

Building	Image	Completed	Location	Notes
Campbell House		1892	21 Salamanca Road, Kelburn, Wellington	The building was designed by Campbell as his family home.
Kaikōura Post Office		1893	1 Torquay Street, Kaikōura	Granted Heritage New Zealand historic place category 2 status in 2006.
Porirua Lunatic Asylum		1894	Porirua	Constructed 1891–94. This was subsequently demolished.
Ashhurst Post Office		1897	64 Bamfield Street, Ashhurst	Granted Heritage New Zealand historic place category 2 status in 2010.
Featherston Courthouse		1897	Featherston	
Hokitika Customhouse		1897	Gibson Quay, Hokitika	Granted Heritage New Zealand historic place category 1 status in 1990
Marton Courthouse		1897	23 High Street, Marton	Granted Heritage New Zealand historic place category 1 status in 1985.
Dunedin Prison		1898	2 Castle Street, Dunedin	The design was completed in 1892 but construction didn't start until 1895 and after a number of delays it was completed in 1898. It was later used as a police station. Granted Heritage New Zealand historic place category 1 status in 1984.
Waitekauri Post Office		1898	Waitekauri	
Clyde Post Office		1900	4 Blyth Street, Clyde	Extended in 1909. Granted Heritage New Zealand historic place category 2 status in 2005.
Tākaka Post Office		1900	73 Commercial Street, Tākaka	Granted Heritage New Zealand historic place category 2 status in 2004.
Collingwood Courthouse		1901	Corner of Elizabeth Street and Gibbs Road, Collingwood	Granted Heritage New Zealand historic place category 2 status in 2004.
Hamilton Post Office		1901	114–120 Victoria Street, Hamilton	Completed 1901. It was then extended in 1916. Granted Heritage New Zealand historic place category 2 status in 1990.
Naseby Post Office		1901	14–16 Derwent Street, Naseby	Granted Heritage New Zealand historic place category 2 status in 2011.
Parliamentary Library		1901	Parliament Grounds, Molesworth Street, Te Aro, Wellington	Constructed 1899–1901. The building was originally designed by Thomas Turnbull and was completed by Campbell after Turnbull resigned from the project following the government's decision to reduce to height of the building to save money. Campbell redesigning the parapets, gables, and roof to accommodate the reduction in the building's height.
Opunake Courthouse		1901	104 Tasman Street, Opunake	Opened in November 1901 with its official opening in February 1902. Granted Heritage New Zealand historic place category 2 status in 1983.
Waihi Courthouse		1901	61 Kenny Street, Waihi	Granted Heritage New Zealand historic place category 1 status in 1990.
Dunedin Law Courts		1902	1 Stuart Street, Dunedin	Granted Heritage New Zealand historic place category 1 status in 1987.
Onehunga Post Office		1902	120 Onehunga Mall, Onehunga	Granted Heritage New Zealand historic place category 2 status in 1993.
Temuka Post Office		1902	59 King Street and Domain Avenue, Temuka	Constructed in 1901–1902. Granted Heritage New Zealand historic place category 2 status in 1983.
Wanganui Post Office		1902	Wanganui	
Hunterville Post Office		1903	10 Bruce Street, Hunterville	Granted Heritage New Zealand historic place category 1 status in 1990.
Newton Police Station		1903	Auckland	
Tauranga Post Office and Government Building		1905	Tauranga	
Dannevirke Courthouse		1905	Gordon Street, Dannevirke	Granted Heritage New Zealand historic place category 2 status in 1986.
Animal Research Laboratory		1905	70 Ward Street, Wallaceville, Upper Hutt	Granted Heritage New Zealand historic place category 1 status in 1985.
Collingwood Courthouse		1906	Collingwood	
Government Building, Tauranga		1906	141 Harington Street, Tauranga	Granted Heritage New Zealand historic place category 1 status in 1983.
Dominion Observatory		1907	Wellington	
Government Building, Napier		1907	Napier	Constructed 1902–7. Destroyed by the 1931 earthquake.
Manakau Post Office		1907	33 Honi Taipua Street, Manakau	Granted Heritage New Zealand historic place category 2 status in 1985.
Cambridge Post Office		1908	43 Victoria Street, Cambridge	Granted Heritage New Zealand historic place category 2 status in 1985.
Eltham Courthouse		1908	Eltham	
Te Kuiti Courthouse		1908	Te Kuiti	
Te Kuiti Public Works Department Office		1908	Te Kuiti	
Roslyn Post Office		1908	Dunedin	
Government Bathhouse		1908	Government Gardens, Rotorua	Constructed 1905–1908, with a southern extension added in 1911–1912. Granted Heritage New Zealand historic place category 1 status in 1985.
Waitomo Caves Hotel		1908	27D Waitomo Village Road and Access Road, Waitomo	Granted Heritage New Zealand historic place category 2 status in 1990.
Cambridge Courthouse		1909	Cambridge	Granted Heritage New Zealand historic place category 2 status in 1985.
Government Building, Greymouth		1909	Greymouth	
Epsom Post Office		1909	311 Manukau Road and Kimberley Road, Epsom, Auckland	The two-storey brick building originally had a Marseilles-tiled roof and rough-cast finish. In 1937 the exterior was modernised and a flat-roofed office was added. Granted Heritage New Zealand historic place category 2 status in 2010.
Matakohe Post Office		1909	Matakohe	
Public Trust Building		1909	Corner of 131–135 Lambton Quay and Stout Street, Te Aro, Wellington	Designed in conjunction with Llewelyn Richards. Granted Heritage New Zealand historic place category 1 status in 1981.
St Bathans Post Office		1909	1680 Loop Road, St Bathans	Granted Heritage New Zealand historic place category 2 status in 2007.
Bannockburn Post Office		1910	Bannockburn	
Government House		1910	1 Rugby Street, Newtown, Te Aro, Wellington	Constructed 1908–1910. The building was principally designed by Campbell's assistant, Claude Paton.
Mornington Post Office		1910	Dunedin	
Ongaonga Post Office		1910	55 Bridge Street, Ongaonga	Granted Heritage New Zealand historic place category 2 status in 1983.
Government Building, Stratford		1911	Stratford	
Kingsland Post Office		1911	Kingsland, Auckland	
Ōpōtiki Courthouse		1911	119 Church Street, Ōpōtiki	Granted Heritage New Zealand historic place category 2 status in 1984.
Shannon Post Office		1911	2 Stout Street, Shannon	Granted Heritage New Zealand historic place category 2 status in 1982.
General Headquarters Building		1912	213–215 Taranaki Street and Buckle Street, Mt Cook, Wellington	Originally known as the Defence Stores Office. Granted Heritage New Zealand historic place category 2 status in 2003.
Greymouth Courthouse		1912	Greymouth	
Masterton Courthouse		1912	Masterton	
Ponsonby Post Office		1912	1–3 St Marys Bay Road, Auckland	Designed by Campbell in association with Claude Paton.
Waikouaiti Post Office		1912	Dunedin	
Chief Post Office		1912	12 Queen Street, Auckland	Designed by Campbell and Claude Paton. Constructed 1909–1912.
Government Buildings, Hokitika		1913	14 Sewell Street, Hokitika	The first half of the building, including the central entrance bay, was completed in 1909. The south end was extended between 1912 and 1913, and it was occupied from 1914 onwards. Granted Heritage New Zealand historic place category 1 status in 1990.
Magistrates District Court		1913	Auckland	Designed by Campbell and Claude Paton.
Otorohanga Courthouse		1913	Otorohanga	
Brooklyn Post Office		1914	22 Cleveland Street, Brooklyn, Wellington	The plans were drawn by drawn by Stuart R. Tennent.
Dargaville Post Office		1914	Dargaville	Designed by Campbell in association with Claude Paton.
North East Valley Post Office		1914	282 North Road and Calder Avenue, Dunedin	
Remuera Post Office		1914	Auckland	
Rotorua Post Office.		1914	Rotorua	
St John's Post Office		1914	373 Victoria Ave, Wanganui	Granted Heritage New Zealand historic place category 2 status in 1982.
Taranaki Street Police Station		1915	25–29 Taranaki Street, Te Aro, Wellington	
Central Police Station		1917	31–35 Waring Taylor Street and 36–40 Johnston Streets, Wellington	Constructed 1914–17.
Oamaru Police Station		1919	14–16 Severn Street, Oamaru	Granted Heritage New Zealand historic place category 2 status in 1982.
Wellesley St Telephone Exchange		1922	Auckland	
Native Land Court and Aotea Māori Land Board Building		1922	11 Rutland Street, Whanganui	Granted Heritage New Zealand historic place category 1 status in 2008.
Parliament House		1922	1 Molesworth Street, Wellington	* Constructed 1912–21. Designed by Campbell in association with Claude Paton. Only one wing was completed. Granted Heritage New Zealand historic place category 1 status in 1989.
Khandallah Automatic Telephone Exchange		1922	86–88 Khandallah Road, Khandallah, Wellington	Constructed 1918–22.
Pearce Block, Southland Boys' High School		1922	Herbert St, Invercargill	Campbell completed the design of the building prior to his retirement and it was constructed under the supervision of his successor John Mair.
