= John Mair (architect) =

New Zealand architect (1876–1959)

- Born: 12 October 1876; Invercargill, New Zealand
- Died: 26 November 1959 (aged 83); Wellington, New Zealand
- Occupation: Architect
- Spouse: Ethel Margaret Snow (m. 1914)
- Children: John Lindsay Mair
- Parent(s): Catherine and Hugh Mair
- Buildings: First Church Invercargill, Government Life Insurance Head Office Wellington, Chief Post Office Dunedin, Stout St Departmental Building in Wellington, Jean Batten Building in Auckland.

John Thomas Mair (12 October 1876 – 26 November 1959) was a New Zealand architect. From 1923 until his retirement in 1941 he held the position of Government Architect.

== Early life and education ==
Mair was born in Invercargill, Southland, New Zealand, on 12 October 1876 to Catherine (nee Hamilton) and Hugh Mair. Hugh Mair had started as a carpenter before becoming a building contractor in partnership with his brother, Matthew. They built the water tower, and a number of large buildings. Hugh served as a borough councillor from 1892-1897 and then mayor of Invercargill from 1897–1898. Mair was educated at Southland Boys' High School in Invercargill.

== Career ==
Mair commenced his architectural training in 1892 with William Sharp, engineer, architect and surveyor to the borough of Invercargill as well as engineer to the Bluff Harbour Board.

In 1900 he moved to Wellington and joined the architectural branch of the New Zealand Railways where he was a member of the staff of the Office Engineer George Troup during the time that he was designing the Dunedin railway station. He remained with Railways for three years, before becoming chief clerk to the architectural firm of William Turnbull and Son in Wellington in Wellington. In 1906 Mair travelled to the United States of America where he studied architecture at the Beaux Arts-influenced University of Pennsylvania, where among his lecturers were Paul Cret and Thomas Nolan. He also got to know the Australian architect John Hennessy. Mair was one of eight out of the class of 23 to graduate and obtained a special certificate of graduation in architecture (S.C.A).

Upon completion of his studies in 1908 he worked with the prominent firm of architect George B. Post and Sons in New York for 12 months. In 1909 he left New York and travelled to London, England for examination prior to being admitted as an Associate of the Royal Institute of British Architects.

=== Return to New Zealand ===
After sitting the exam Mair returned via a building study tour of the United Kingdom, France and Italy to New Zealand. He was home in Invercargill, New Zealand by October 1909. While in Invercargill he obtained the commission to design one of his most notable early buildings, the Presbyterian First Church in Invercargill, with the plans approved in February 1910. The church was of Romanesque character, whose design was influenced by the neo-Romanesque work of the American architect Henry Hobson Richardson. The church was completed in 1915.

By April 1910 he had moved to Wellington where he established a private practice as both an architect and structural engineer with an office at 16 Stock Exchange Building, Featherston Street. He largely carried domestic commissions, but among his clients was the Upper Hutt Town Board. His father represented him in Invercargill.

In 1918 he was appointed Inspector of Military Hospitals by the Defence Department. He supervised the erection of King George Hospital and of the Waipukurau Sanatorium. In 1920 he became architect to the Department of Education.

=== Government architect ===
Following the retirement of John Campbell in 1922, Mair was appointed Government Architect in April 1923, a position which he held until his own retirement. The introduction of the Public Service Act 1912, had established a unified structure in place of the quasi-independent public sector fiefdoms under which Mair's predecessor had operated. The Act codified public service career paths in a manner that tended to be more favourable for engineers than architects. As a result Mair's office lacked autonomy as it reported to an Under-Secretary in a Public Works Department which was dominated by engineer. In 1930 he was elected a member of the Town Planning Institute of New Zealand. Mair's strong leadership guided his office through the Depression, the sudden rebuilding demand of the Napier earthquake, and the beginning of World War II.

Most of the government buildings designed during Mair's tenure as Government Architect were significant departures from the buildings designed by his predecessor with the Public Works Department adopting modernist architectural precepts with an emphasis on function, structure and volume. His designs were typically restrained with In structural terms he was a leader by utilising concrete and structural steel which provided a superior seismic ability compared with the brick and timber which had been preferred to date in New Zealand. As Government Architect Mair was responsible for a wide range variety of buildings, including courthouse, post offices and Government administration buildings. Notable among them were the Government Life Insurance Head Office in Wellington (1939), Chief Post Office in Dunedin (1937), Stout St Departmental Building in Wellington (1940) and the Jean Batten Building in Auckland (1941). During the difficult period of the depression Mair supported private architects in cities and towns outside Wellington by allocating government contracts to them. For many years Mair's staff were divided between offices in the Government Buildings and the old Museum Building. In 1939 he was able to bring them into a single office located in an upper storey of the Whitmore Street annexe to the Government Buildings.

In 1941 Mair served together with the Acting Prime Minister Walter Nash, Horace Massey (president of the New Zealand Institute of Architects) and J. W. Mawson (Government Town Planner) on the jury to select a design for the clifftop mausoleum and memorial gardens for New Zealand Prime Minister, Michael Savage at Bastion Point, Auckland.

=== Retirement ===
Following his retirement in October 1941 he was succeeded as Government Architect by his assistant Robert Adams Patterson in February 1942. He committed suicide on 26 November 1959 at his home in Khandallah, Wellington.

== Honours ==
He became a Fellow of the Royal Institute of British Architects in 1940. He was also made a Fellow of the New Zealand Institute of Architects, and became a Life Member in 1942.

== Personal life ==
On 29 April 1914, at the age of 37, Mair was married at his parents' house in Liddel Street in Invercargill to Ethel Margaret Snow of Wellington by the Rev. R, M. Ryburn, M.A., of First Church. Sadly within months Ethel contracted tuberculosis and died at the age of 33 in September 1915, leaving Mair to raise their eight-month-old son, John. Mair's father had died the previous month at the age of 72. Mair never remarried.

His son John Lindsay Mair also practised as an architect.

== Works ==
Among the buildings which Mair personally designed, collaborated on or supervised the design of are:

Building	Image	Completed	Location	Notes
First Church		1914	155 Tay Street and Ythan Street, Invercargill	Granted Heritage New Zealand historic place category 1 status in 1984.
Bank of New Zealand, Otaki		1918	49 Main Street, Otaki	Designed by Mair in association with Haughton. It currently houses the Otaki Museum.
Dannevirke Post Office		1923	Dannevirke	
Devonport Police Station		1924	7 Rattray Street Devonport, Auckland	
Administration Block, Hastings Boys' High School	Hastings Boys High School designed by J.T. Mair	1926	Hastings	Designed by Mair in association with George Penlington in a Spanish Mission style.
Paeroa Post Office		1926	101 Normanby Road, Paeroa	
Te Kopuru Post Office		1925	Te Kopuru	
Tinui Post Office		1926	Tinui	
Chisholm Ward, Queen Mary Hospital		1926	Hanmer Springs	Arts and Crafts bungalow style
Marton Post Office		1927	Marton	
Nurses' Home, Seddon Memorial Hospital		1927	Gore	
Waitomo Caves Hotel		1928	27D Waitomo Village Road and Access Road, Waitomo	Mair designed what is now termed the “Art Deco” extension to this hotel which had been designed by Campbell and had opened in 1908. Granted Heritage New Zealand historic place category 2 status in 1990.
Arbitration Court Building		1928	Whitmore Street, Wellington	Construction commenced in 1927.
Napier Post Office		1929	Napier	
Wellington East Post Office		1930	Wellington	
Maungaturoto Courthouse		1930	Maungaturoto	Courthouse for the Kaipara District.
Hamilton Courthouse		1931	116 Anglesea Street, Hamilton	
Westport Post Office		1931	Westport	
Blue Baths		1931-33	Rotorua	Constructed between 1931 and 1933 of reinforced concrete with a float type foundation. Modifications including the insertion of heating were made between 1934 and 1935. Granted Heritage New Zealand historic place category 1 status in 1992.
Hastings Post Office		1932	Hastings	Constructed after the 1931 Hawke's Bay Earthquake in the Stripped Classical style. NZ Heritage Listed Category II Listed and also a part of the Russell Street Historic Area. The building underwent a conversion in 2022 and is now a Westpac Bank Branch.
High St Post and Telegraph Office		1934	209 Tuam Street, Christchurch	
Putaruru Courthouse		1935	Putaruru	
Rangiora Post Office		1936	Corner of High and Percival Streets, Rangiora	This two-storey Art Deco building has a chamfered corner. The upper floor housed the telephone exchange and the postmaster's residence.
Blenheim Courthouse		1937	58 Alfred Street, Blenheim	Officially opened 7 September 1938. Constructed from golden sandstone, its front façade features columns and wide steps.
Dunedin Art School, King Edward Technical College		1937	Corner of Tennyson Street and York Place, Dunedin	This was a purpose-built art school that was an architectural departure from the rest of the College. As the art school building was partially funded by a substantial grant from the government the building was designed by the Public Works Department instead of the college's normal architects. The sketch plans were ready by August 1935 with construction tenders called for in May 1936. The school was officially opened on 22 March 1937. The King Edward Technical College was granted Heritage New Zealand historic place category 2 status in 1987.
Dunedin Central Post Office		1937	6 Liverpool Street, Dunedin	Designed in 1934.
Pahiatua Post Office		1937	122 Main Street, Pahiatua	This single-storey, painted reinforced concrete building with stripped classical features and Art Deco detailing was granted Heritage New Zealand historic place category 2 status in 2011.
Ashburton Courthouse		1938	Corner of Baring Square West and Cameron Street, Ashburton	Scheduled as a Group B heritage item in the Ashburton District Plan.
Invercargill Law Courts		1938	Invercargill	
Palmerston North Police Station		1938	351-361 Church Street, Palmerston North	A Art Deco design with highly decorative and bold elements. Granted Heritage New Zealand historic place category 2 status in 2010.
Government Life Insurance Office		1938	106-110 Trafalgar Street, Nelson	Later renamed the State Advances Building.
Spring St Post Office		1938	Spring Street, Tauranga	
State Fire and Accident Insurance Office		1938	Invercargill	
Wigram Administration Building		1938	Flying Training School, RNZAF Base Wigram	The same plans were used for the Hobsonville Station Headquarters. The building was demolished circa 2014.
Government Life Insurance Head Office		1939	50-64 Customhouse Quay, 9 Brandon Street and 2-6 Panama Street, Wellington	Constructed between 1935 and 1939. Granted Heritage New Zealand historic place category 2 status in 1984.
Public Works Department Building		1939	Napier	
Station Headquarters, RNZAF Base Ohakea		1939	Kororareka Avenue, Ohakea	
Rotorua Police Station		1940	1182 Tutanekai Street, Rotorua	
Stout St Departmental Building		1940	15-21 Stout Street, Ballance and Maginnity Streets, Wellington	This is a steel framed building with reinforced concrete walls. At the time of its construction it was the largest office block in New Zealand. Granted Heritage New Zealand historic place category 2 status in 1981.
Otorohanga Post Office		1940	32 Maniapoto St, Otorohanga	Art Deco-styled building with a chamfered corner.
RNZAF Headquarters Building		1940	214 Buckley Avenue, Hobsonville	Designed in 1938 and constructed between 19139 and 1940. Plans of the building were labelled “RNZAF Flying Training School Hobsonville Aerodrome Administration Building”. This label gave rise to the building originally being known as the Administration Building. The title “Headquarters” is shown on the plans of the building.
Wellington Children's Dental Clinic		1940	Wellington	
Jean Batten State Building		1941	Auckland	This was one of the earliest major government office buildings to be constructed in the moderne style. It was largely demolished in 2007 with only the rear sides and the rear (as seen from Queen Street) being retained for 80 Queen Street.
Post Office, Invercargill		1941	Invercargill	
Nelson College		1941	Nelson	
Post Office, Lower Hutt		1943	2-10 Andrews Avenue and 151 High Street, Lower Hutt	The construction contract for this Moderne design, which incorporated Art Deco elements was issued in July 1940, but it was not until a year later that the foundation stone was laid. Further delays caused by shortages associated with the Second World War meant that the post office did not open until February 1943, with work still to be completed on the upper storeys of the building. Granted Heritage New Zealand historic place category 2 status in 1985.
