= Government Buildings, Hokitika =

Former government buildings in Hokitika, New Zealand

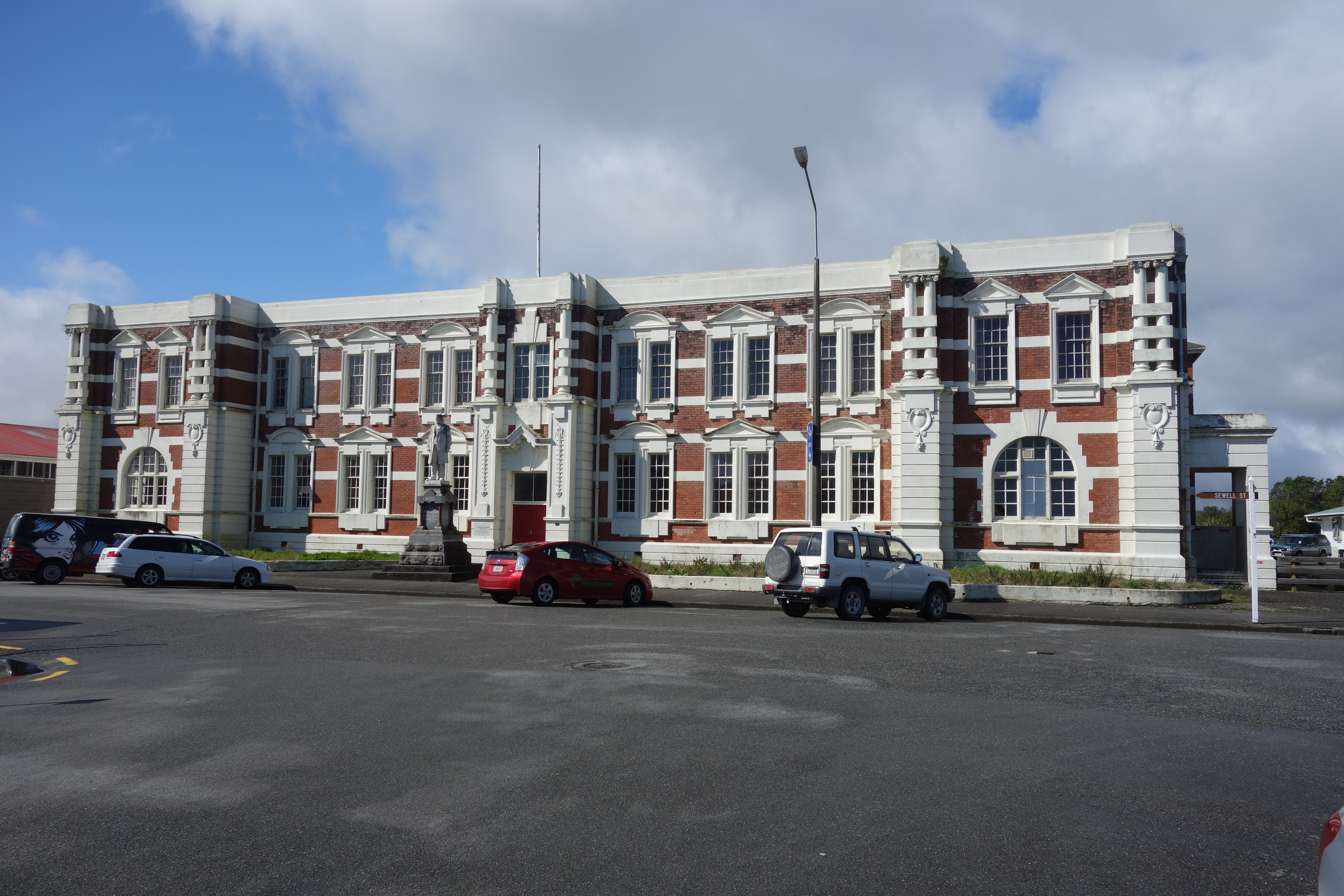
- Government Buildings, Hokitika
- Interactive map of the Government Buildings, Hokitika area

General information
- Architectural style: Edwardian Baroque
- Location: 14 Sewell Street, Hokitika, New Zealand
- Coordinates: 42.719118°S 170.963054°E
- Construction started: 1908
- Completed: 1913
- Owner: Heritage New Zealand

Design and construction
- Architect: John Campbell

Heritage New Zealand – Category 1
- Designated: 28 June 1990
- Reference no.: 5011

The former Government Buildings in Hokitika, also known as Seddon House, are on the West Coast of the South Island of New Zealand. The building is classified as a "Category I" ("places of 'special or outstanding historical or cultural heritage significance or value'") historic place by Heritage New Zealand Pouhere Taonga, previously known as the New Zealand Historic Places Trust.

== History ==
The Government Buildings were designed by Government Architect, John Campbell primarily as a response to the request by the Lands and Survey Department for more and better space. Campbell also incorporated a new courthouse and space for other government departments.

Contract plans for the first half of the building were completed in January 1908. While tenders for the building were being considered, a public subscription in Hokitika raised funds for a statue of Richard Seddon. Minister of Public Works William Hall-Jones requested that the Government Buildings be set back to allow the statue to be placed in front. Campbell agreed that the building be set back 20 feet (6.1m), although he did this to allow shrubs to be planted in front, as he did not consider the setback sufficient for the statue. The statue was however placed outside the partially completed Government Buildings and unveiled on 25 May 1910.

== Construction and style ==
Prime Minister, Sir Joseph Ward, laid the foundation stone on 7 May 1908. Construction of the first half of the building, the main entrance and the left wing, was completed by 8 June 1909. Plans for the second half were not drawn up until November 1911. The second stage of the building contained the new courthouse. The original plans had contained both a Magistrates' Court on the ground floor and a Supreme Court above. However in 1911 the Supreme Court was moved to Greymouth, and so the plans were redrawn to contain a boardroom above the Magistrates' Court. The building was completed by end of 1913, and contained the Supreme Court, the Stipendiary Magistrate and Warden's Court, the office of the Commissioner of Crown Lands and offices for the Chief Surveyor, Education Board, and County Council.

The building is constructed of banded brick and plaster in an Edwardian Imperial Baroque style. The Hokitika building is considered more restrained than some of Campbell's earlier designs, such as the Dunedin Law Courts. According to Heritage New Zealand Pouhere Taonga, it was one of the key buildings which established Edwardian Baroque as the style of government architecture in New Zealand in the early part of this century.

== Changing uses and ownership ==
The courtroom was closed in the 1970s due to restructuring by the then Department of Justice.

The building was registered by the New Zealand Historic Places Trust as a Category I item in June 1990, with registration number 5011.

The building housed various government departments until the 1990s, but was sold by the government in 1994. In 2015, it was sold to three Auckland property investors, and then put on the market again in 2017.

On the 26 September 2020, the building was purchased by Heritage New Zealand for $400,000. The New Zealand Government will invest $22 million from the Government’s $3 billion infrastructure fund in seismic strengthening and for the building to be refitted for use as offices for the Department of Conservation (DOC), which will lease the building.
