= Hokitika Customhouse =

Historic building in New Zealand

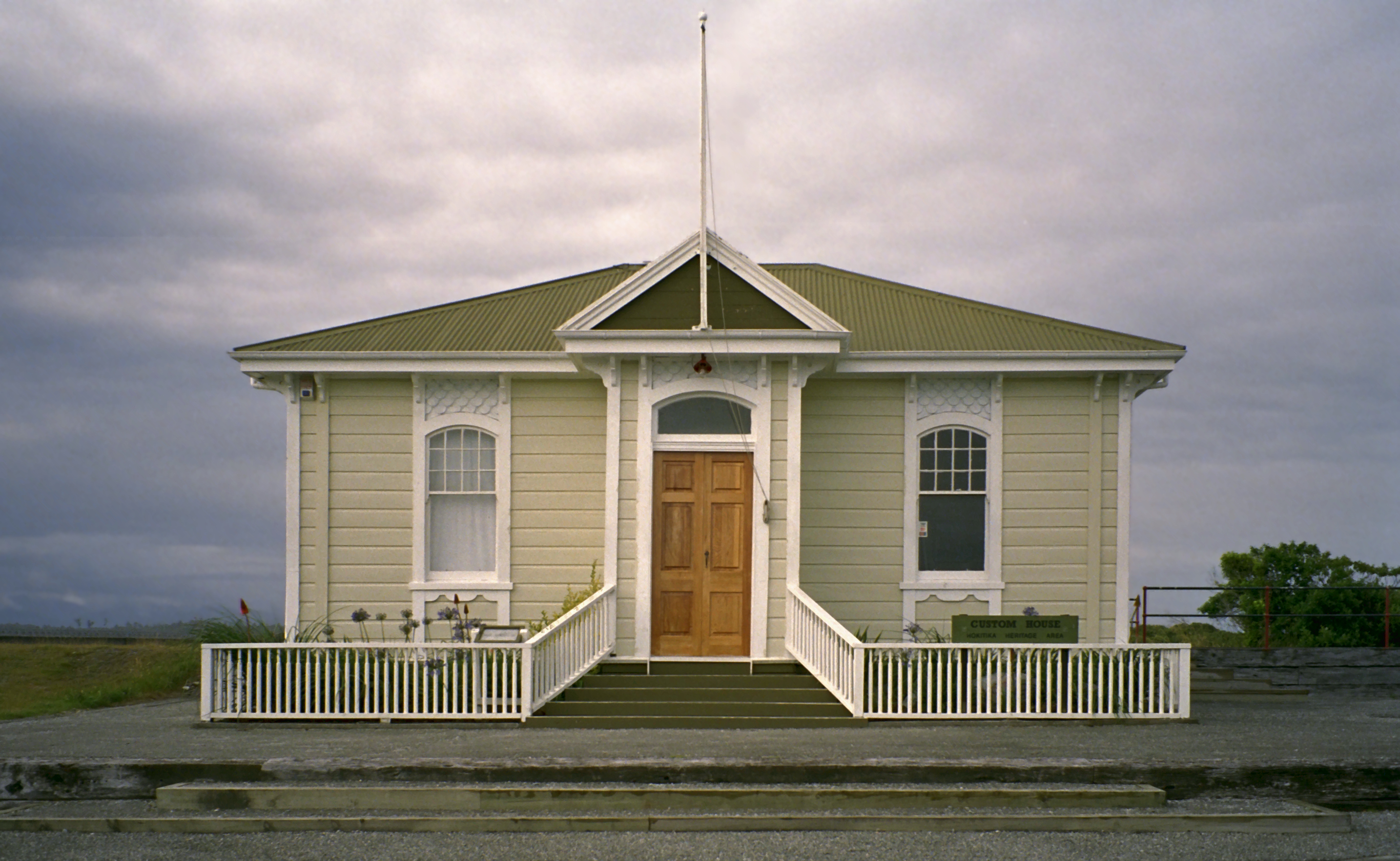
- Hokitika Customhouse in 1993
- Interactive map of the Hokitika Customhouse area

General information
- Location: Gibson Quay, Hokitika, New Zealand
- Coordinates: 42°43′11″S 170°57′41″E
- Completed: 1897
- Cost: NZ£400
- Owner: Westland District Council

Technical details
- Structural system: Timber
- Floor count: one

Design and construction
- Architect: John Campbell

Heritage New Zealand – Category 1
- Designated: 28 June 1990
- Reference no.: 1700

Hokitika Customhouse is an historic building in Hokitika on the West Coast of the South Island of New Zealand.

The West Coast gold rush of 1864 established Hokitika as an important regional town and port.

The first customhouse was erected on Gibson's Quay, where the current Department of Conservation annex stands, in July 1865. It was enlarged the following year. The current building was erected by the Public Works Department in 1897 at a cost of £400 to a design by John Campbell. After the Hokitika port closed in 1954, the building was no longer needed as a custom house, and was used by the Ministry of Works. In 1985 it was taken over by the local council and shifted to its present site, where it was officially reported in March 1990.

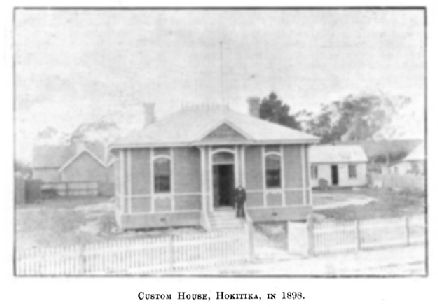
The Customhouse in 1898 on its original site, soon after it was built

The Customhouse is a small plain building clad in rusticated weatherboards, with Queen Anne influences.

The Customhouse is registered by the New Zealand Historic Places Trust as a Category I structure, with registration number 1700.
