= Hunuki Hunukitama =

Niue Assembly member

Member of Niue Assembly
- In office April 2001 – July 2003
- Preceded by: Hima Douglas
- Succeeded by: Krypton Okesene

Secretary to Premier of Niue
- Preceded by: ?
- Succeeded by: ?

Personal details
- Died: July 2003 Limu Pools, Niue
- Party: Independent

Hunuki Saletogia Hunukitama (died July 2003) was a Niuean politician and independent member of the Niue Assembly from 2001 until his death in 2003. Prior to his election to the assembly, Hunukitama served as the secretary to the premier of Niue. Additionally, Hunukitama served in managerial roles across a number of governmental and business organizations.

== Political career ==
Hunukitama was elected to a common roll seat in the Niue Assembly in an April 2001 by-election that occurred after MP Hima Douglas resigned to take an appointment as the High Commissioner of Niue to New Zealand, defeating a Niue People's Party candidate by a significant margin. Hunukitama was re-elected to the Niue Assembly in the 2002 Niuean general election as a common roll member. In that year, Hunukitama ran against Young Vivian for Premier of Niue and lost 6 votes to 14.

In 2002, Hunukitama and former premier Sani Lakatani visited Baltimore, Maryland to broker a deal with a Korean group called the Christian Ambassador Mission Holy People University that wanted to set up a holy city in Niue that would act as the group's headquarters on 121 hectares of farmland in Vaiea. The facility was planned to house 600 people, construct a temple, and be fully walled and guarded and disallow police access. In addition to meeting with the group, Hunukitama and others in the Niue government conducted background checks for the organization.

Prior to his election to the assembly, Hunukitama served as the secretary to the premier of Niue.

== Business career ==
Hunukitama was the inaugural chairman of the first Polynesian radio station in Auckland and was a manager of the Auckland Office of Pacific Island Affairs. As of 2001, Hunukitama was the chief executive officer of the Niue Growers Association, which markets taro grown in Niue on the Auckland market.

== Death ==
In July 2003, Hunukitama died at the Lord Liverpool Hospital after he collapsed at the Limu Reef pools. Hunukitama's family filed a formal complaint with the police regarding his treatment at the hospital. The 2003 Niue Common Roll by-election was held in August 2003 to fill Hunukitama's seat in the Niue Assembly. Krypton Okesene defeated five other candidates, including Lofa Rex and Kupa Magatongia, to take the vacant position.
