= 2003 Niue Common Roll by-election =

Niue Common Roll by-election

The 2003 Niue Common Roll by-election was held in August 2003 to fill a vacant common roll seat in the Niue Assembly after the death of Hunuki Hunukitama in July 2003. The seat was won by Krypton Okesene of Tuapa, who received 55 more votes than Lofa Rex, wife of MP Robert Rex, Jr. Former director of education, Kupa Magatongia, received the third most votes, ahead of three other candidates.
