= Bill Whitehead =

New Zealand sports administrator (1931–2021)

William Albert Whitehead QSM (19 August 1931 – 15 January 2021) was a New Zealand sports administrator who was involved in rugby league for more than 70 years. He also worked in horse racing and bowls. He received the Queen's Service Medal in 1987. He also played one game for Marist, and played with University for one season.

== Life and career ==
He is arguably the most decorated man in Rugby League, being the holder of nine life memberships, both the senior and schoolboys boards of Canterbury and West Coast, his club Marist and NZ Marist Rugby League Association of which he was President for a record eight years, and patron when it was disbanded by President/Secretary Ross Lipscombe in 2000.

He was selected as winner of Nelson/Stewart Challenge Trophy as Personality of Tournament at the last NZ Marist tournament in 1997 in Wellington. He was manager of the NZ Marist team to Australia in 1979. Whitehead was Deputy Chairman of Canterbury Schoolboys board in 1964, but was headhunted to join senior Board of Control in 1965 (till 1974) to prepare Rugby League Weekly, the official CRFL programme (was its editor for over a decade), with renowned historian John Coffey. He, and CRFL Secretary Dave Gaynor were inducted as the first Rangitira of the Maori Advisory Board in 1971. "WA" was for some time a Vice President of NZ Universities Rugby League, a team he managed to beat Australian Universities for the first time in 1971, when coached by Eddie Butts, and was a life member (its last) of the now defunct NZRL Schoolboys' Council, and elected a life member of NZ Rugby League (with original schoolboy Kiwi, Bud Lisle) in 1998. He was awarded the Queen's Service Medal by Sir Paul Reeves in 1986 after managing the schoolboy Kiwis to Australia in 1986, having been NZ Manager in 1980 and 1984.

He has been local manager or managed 300 teams, including every West Coast side from 1964 to 1989 during which time 25 Kiwis passed through his hands, and most countries, NSW Country (3 times), Queensland Country, and all provinces. He and the late Lory Blanchard, a Rugby League legend and former Kiwi coach, were proxy delegates for West Coast and Otago in 1968, before Whitehead became WC Deputy Delegate from 1969, then Resident Delegate from 1972 until Council wound up in 1991. He was Secretary-Manager of South Island Rugby League Kiwis Association. He is a son of former Speaker of Parliament in the Kirk Government, Sir Stanley Whitehead KB JP, Member of Parliament for Nelson for 18 years. Whitehead senior was a former player with Blackball and Inangahua before being a provincial referee in both Union and League. He controlled Buller versus Inangahua (then a sub league of West Coast) in both Union and League, both games on Victoria Square in Westport. His uncle (Bill Clark) scored a try for Inangahua v Canterbury in 1937 when the Canterbury fullback was the legendary George Nēpia, who then played for Hornby. As well as Canterbury XIII, the History of Canterbury Rugby League, Coffey also did the centenary book in 2013. His tenth life membership was of the Canterbury Licensed Trade Bowls club, he was its tournament convenor for many years when Blanchard was President. He was Bar Manager (eight bars) for the DB Golden Oldies World Cricket Festival in 1992 and organised South Island, Canterbury Jockeys Rugby Union teams from 1958 to Whitehead was Chairman of the 75th Anniversary Committee for Canterbury in 1987, when Coffey, or "Coffdrop" to his friends, published 1965 and co-ordinator of Rugby League Night at Trots at Addington Raceway from its inception in 1982 till 2011. He was Assistant Manager of Kiwis at World Cup in 1977, and Media Manager of Weightlifting at 1974 Commonwealth Games, when his late father hosted the Queen and Prince Philip. He has also been secretary (now Secretary-Manager) of South Island Kiwis Association when the late Mel Cooke was President, and since under Mike O'Donnell.

== Death ==
William Albert Whitehead. Born: 19 August 1931 at Inangahua. Died: 15 January 2021 at Christchurch. Pre-deceased by wife Cath. Survived by sons Tony and James, and daughters Sharon, Lisa and Angela, and their families.
