= Ministry of Defence (New Zealand) =

Government ministry of New Zealand

- Manatū Kaupapa Waonga (Māori)

Agency overview
- Formed: 1964
- Jurisdiction: New Zealand
- Headquarters: Level 2, Defence House, 34 Bowen Street, Wellington
- Annual budget: Vote Defence; Total budget for 2019/20 $766,047,000
- Minister responsible: Hon Paul Goldsmith, Minister of Defence
- Agency executive: Brook Barrington, Chief Executive and Secretary of Defence
- Website: www.defence.govt.nz

The Ministry of Defence (Māori: Manatū Kaupapa Waonga) is the public service department of New Zealand responsible for advising the government on strategic defence policy, acquiring military equipment to meet defence capability and conducting audits and assessments of the New Zealand Defence Force.

== History ==
The Defence Act 1964, passed on 17 November, established a new Ministry of Defence. Under the Act the three armed services were combined into the new ministry. The central core of the new Ministry of Defence was the central Defence Office.

A Defence Council was established which consisted of:

- Minister of Defence
- Chief of Defence Staff
- Secretary of Defence
- Chiefs of Staff from the three Services
- Co-opted members if required (especially the Secretaries of External Affairs and Treasury)

The Defence Council was responsible for:

- Administering and commanding the Services
- Advising the Minister on defence policy
- Integrating common functions where desirable and practical

The boards for each service continued to exist, but they acted under delegated power from the Defence Council. The Chiefs of Staff Committee was retained, but as a committee of the Defence Council. (The Defence Council was later abolished under the Defence Act 1990).

In 1969–1971 moves were implemented to provide a fully centralised administration in control of all non-operational functions previously within the responsibility of the three services. These changes were embodied in a further Defence Act that came into effect on 1 April 1972. The Service Boards were abolished and their functions divided between the Chiefs of Staff and a central Defence Headquarters that replaced the Defence Office. The disadvantage of the continued existence of the Service Boards had been one that the one Service could still express its views to the Minister independently of the other Services. Policy formation and planning, logistics and supply, personnel, administration, finance, civil management, and management services were transferred to the central Defence Headquarters. Each Chief of Staff and their separate Headquarters were now only concerned with operational matters.

In 1989 Defence was separated into two separate bodies – the Ministry of Defence headed by the Secretary of Defence, the senior civilian officer and the New Zealand Defence Force headed by the Chief of Defence Force (CDF), the senior military officer. Both are equally answerable to the Minister of Defence for their individual elements.

Under the CDF are the three service chiefs who, as the senior officers of their individual services, act as advisors to CDF and provide forces as required.

== Responsibilities ==
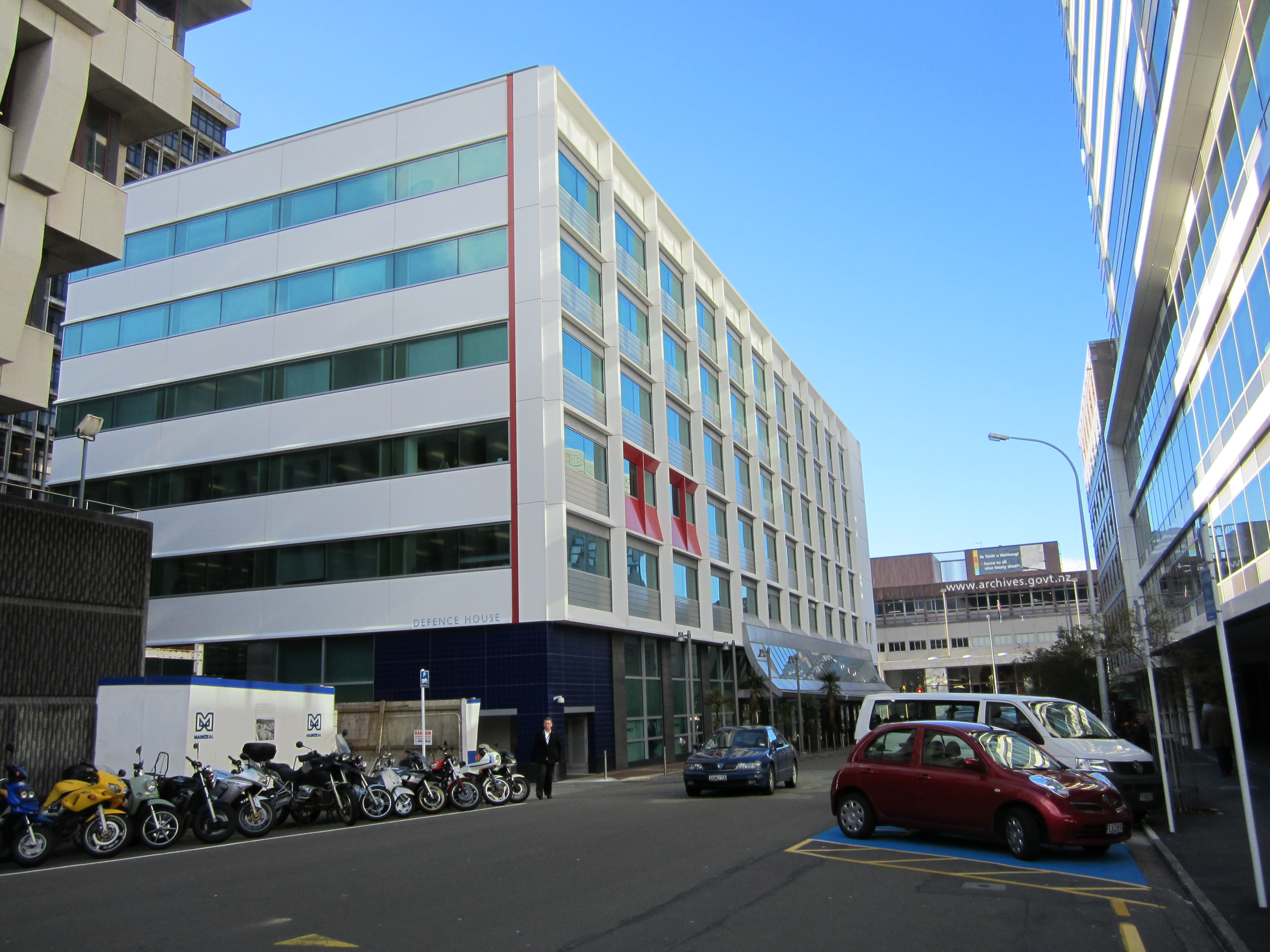
Former Defence House in Wellington. The Ministry moved to a new site in 2018 due to damage sustained to the old building in the 2016 earthquakes.

In 1999 James Rolfe described in The Armed Forces of New Zealand the then structure of the Ministry of Defence. It numbered only about 70 people in total, with three divisions involved in policy: Policy Division, Acquisition Division, and Evaluation Division. Also part of the structure were Corporate Services Division and Corporate Finance Division. The Ministry is responsible for the following functions:

- Providing advice to the New Zealand Government on the Defence of New Zealand and its national interests,
- Acquisition of Military Equipment,
- Assessment and audit of the New Zealand Defence Force functions, duties and projects.

== See also ==
- Military history of New Zealand
