= Terry Magaoa Chapman =

Niuean administrator

Terry Chapman MBE
- Born: Terry Magaoa Chapman; 1944 or 1945; Hakupu, Niue
- Died: 2 January 2014 (aged 69); Hamilton, New Zealand

Terry Magaoa Chapman MBE (1944 or 1945 – 2 January 2014) was a Niuean administrator known for his work in advocating the self-governance of Niue.

== Biography ==
Chapman was born in the village of Hakupu on Niue, and studied at Victoria University of Wellington in New Zealand, where he was awarded a Diploma in Public Administration. He was a leading architect, with Robert Rex and Young Vivian, of the modern Niue and in the formulation of its Constitution, creating a pathway for the island to become self-governing on 19 October 1974, which followed a visit from the United Nations Decolonisation Committee to Niue.

Chapman wrote a book, The Decolonisation of Niue, published in 1976. He was appointed a Member of the Order of the British Empire in the 1987 New Year Honours, in recognition for his services as Secretary to the Government of Niue.

== Death ==
Chapman died in Hamilton, New Zealand, where he had lived since 2006, on 2 January 2014, aged 69, and was survived by his wife, Fakaofomatua Pepese Chapman, and their children.

== Works ==
- Chapman, Terry Magaoa (1974). The development of Niue's political institutions of government (an essay submitted in partial fulfilment of the requirements for a Diploma in Public Administration). Victoria University of Wellington.
- Chapman, Terry Magaoa (1976). The decolonisation of Niue. Wellington: Victoria University Press & New Zealand Institute of International Affairs.
- Chapman, Terry Magaoa (1982). "Chapter 8: Modern times". Niue: a history of the island. Alofi: University of the South Pacific, Institute of Pacific Studies, & Government of Niue.
- Chapman, Terry Magaoa (1990). Preliminary report on Cyclone Ofa. Alofi: Disaster Council.
- Chapman, Terry Magaoa; Enetama, Moira, eds. (2008). Tāoga Niue. Alofi: Department of Niue Cultural Heritage.
