= Richard Strachan De Renzy Harman =

New Zealand architect

Richard Harman
- Born: Richard Strachan De Renzy Harman; 18 November 1896; Christchurch, New Zealand
- Died: 14 September 1953 (aged 56)
- Occupation: Architect
- Spouse: Jocelyn Mary Wilson (m. 1933)
- Buildings: All Saints' Church, Hokitika; Church of the Good Shepherd, Lake Tekapo
- Relatives: Thomas Harman (father); Richard Harman (uncle); Annesley Harman (uncle); Richard Harman (grandfather); Cecil Wilson (father-in-law)

Richard Strachan De Renzy Harman (18 November 1896 – 14 September 1953) was a New Zealand architect based in Christchurch during the first half of the 20th century, and was particularly known as an ecclesiastical and residential architect. His notable works include the Church of the Good Shepherd, Lake Tekapo.

== Biography ==
Born in Christchurch in 1896, Harman was the eldest son of lawyer Thomas De Renzy Harman and Jenny Harman (née Cook). His uncles included Richard Dacre Harman, also an architect, and Annesley Harman, and his grandfather was Richard James Strachan Harman, one of the Canterbury Pilgrims.

Harman was educated in Christchurch. Between 1914 and 1916, he served his articles with the Christchurch firm of Seager and Macleod, and took classes at the Canterbury College School of Art. He saw military service with the New Zealand Expeditionary Force in France during the latter part of World War I, and then undertook further study at the Royal College of Art, London, before returning to New Zealand. He rejoined Seager's practice, but spent another period in London between 1923 and 1926, when he worked for the ancient monuments branch of the Office of Works, as well as doing further study.

After Harman returned to New Zealand, he worked in partnership with Cecil Wood from December 1926 until setting up his own practice in 1928. Harman gained a reputation as a residential and ecclesiastical architect, and was particularly associated with the Anglican Church. He was appointed as consulting architect for ChristChurch Cathedral in the 1940s, and designed the Chapel of St Michael and St George for the south transept in 1949.

Harman was elected president of the New Zealand Institute of Architects in 1949.

On 22 February 1933, at St Augustine's Church, Cashmere, Harman married Jocelyn Mary Wilson, the daughter of Cecil Wilson, the bishop of Bunbury in Western Australia; the wedding ceremony was conducted by Jocelyn's grandfather, Archbishop Churchill Julius. Richard Harman died on 14 September 1953, and he was buried at Waimairi Cemetery, Christchurch. His wife, Jocelyn, died in 1991.

== Notable works ==
Notable buildings designed by Harman include:

Building	Image	Date	Location	Notes
Church of the Good Shepherd		1935	Pioneer Drive, Lake Tekapo	Granted Heritage New Zealand historic place category 1 status in 1985
St James' Church		1935	750 Harewood Road, Christchurch	Second vestry added to north elevation in 1991
All Saints' Church		1936	57 Bealey Street, Hokitika	Granted Heritage New Zealand historic place category 1 status in 1990
St Ninian's Church		1936	Kane Road, Hāwea Flat	Vestry added in 1953, to plans drawn by Harman
St Matthew's Church		1937	1075 Halkett Road, Kirwee	Concrete construction, with stained-glass windows from earlier church
Cathedral of St John the Evangelist		1965	28 Browning Street, Napier	Preliminary design by Harman; design completed by Malcolm and Sweet, Napier, after Harman's death
