= Richard Harman =

Richard Harman may refer to:

- Richard Harman (cricketer) (1859–1927), New Zealand architect and sportsman
- Richard Harman (journalist), New Zealand television current affairs broadcaster
- Richard Harman (politician) (c. 1621–1646), English politician
- Richard James Strachan Harman (1826–1902), a Founding Father of Canterbury Province, New Zealand
- Richard Strachan De Renzy Harman (1896–1953), New Zealand architect

== See also ==
- Richard Harman Reeves (1836–1910) New Zealand politician
- Richard Harmon (born 1991), Canadian actor
