= All Saints' Church, Hokitika =

All Saints' Church
- Hokitika Anglican Church
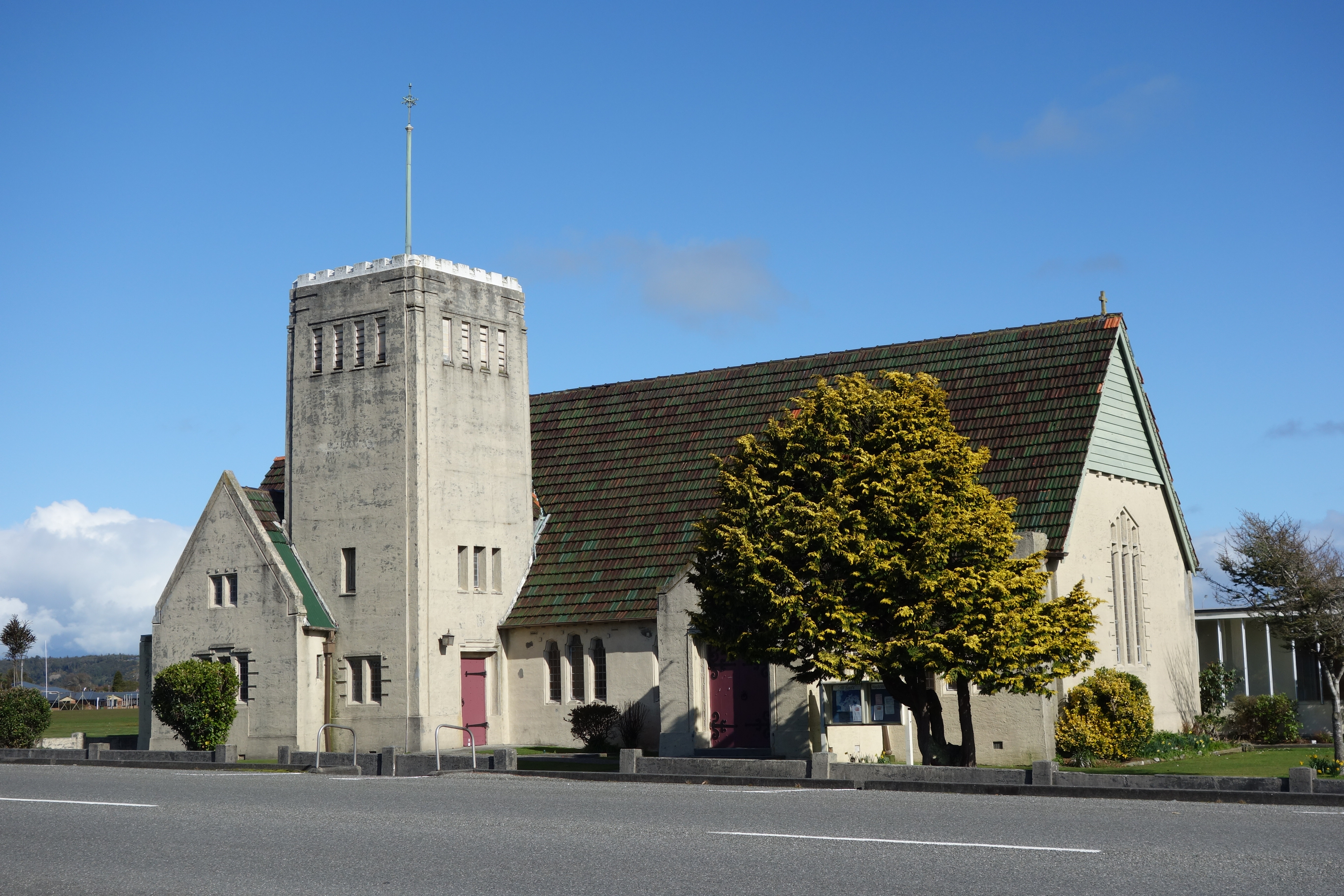
- All Saints' Church, Hokitika
- All Saints' Church
- 42°43′05″S 170°58′02″E
- Location: 57 Bealey Street and Stafford Street, Hokitika, South Island
- Country: New Zealand
- Denomination: Anglican
- Website: anglicansinwestland.co.nz

History
- Status: Church
- Dedication: World War I war memorial
- Consecrated: 1 November 1936 by Bishop West-Watson

Architecture
- Functional status: Active
- Architect: Richard Strachan De Renzy Harman
- Architectural type: Church
- Groundbreaking: 1936
- Construction cost: NZ£4,142

Specifications
- Capacity: 200 people
- Materials: Reinforced concrete

Administration
- Province: Anglican Church in Aotearoa, New Zealand and Polynesia
- Diocese: Christchurch
- Parish: Parish of Westland

Clergy
- Priest: Rev. Tim Handley

Heritage New Zealand – Category 1
- Designated: 28 June 1990
- Reference no.: 5012

All Saints' Church, also known as Hokitika Anglican Church, is an heritage-listed Anglican church located in Hokitika, on the West Coast of the South Island of New Zealand. The church forms part of the Westland Parish, covering the South Westland Communities reaching from Hokitika to Haast. The parish is part of the Diocese of Christchurch within the Anglican Church in Aotearoa, New Zealand and Polynesia. The church building is a Category I building on the Heritage New Zealand register.

== Background ==
Soon after the establishment of Hokitika, during the West Coast gold rush of the 1860s, an Anglican church was built. This wooden building was erected in 1866 on Fitzherbert Street. Subsequently, the congregation decided to erect a new church as a memorial to All Saints' members who had died during World War I. A building fund was established, and in 1919 an architect from Invercargill, Edmund Wilson (1871–1941) was engaged to draw up plans. Despite putting forward a number of plans, no church was built, and the agreement with Wilson was dissolved in 1935.

The congregation then invited proposals from several architects including Cecil Wood, Roy Lovell-Smith and Richard Strachan De Renzy Harman. The congregation specified that the church be built from concrete, seat 200 people, and not cost more than NZ£4,000. A design from Harman was accepted. It is possible the congregation was inspired to specify concrete both by the relative cheapness of the material, and by the construction in 1931 of the nearby St Andrew's Presbyterian Church. Earthquake safety may also have been a consideration, after the 1931 Hawke's Bay earthquake.

== Construction ==
Building began in 1936 and the church was consecrated on 1 November 1936, All Saints' Day, by the Rt. Rev. Campbell West-Watson, Bishop of Christchurch.

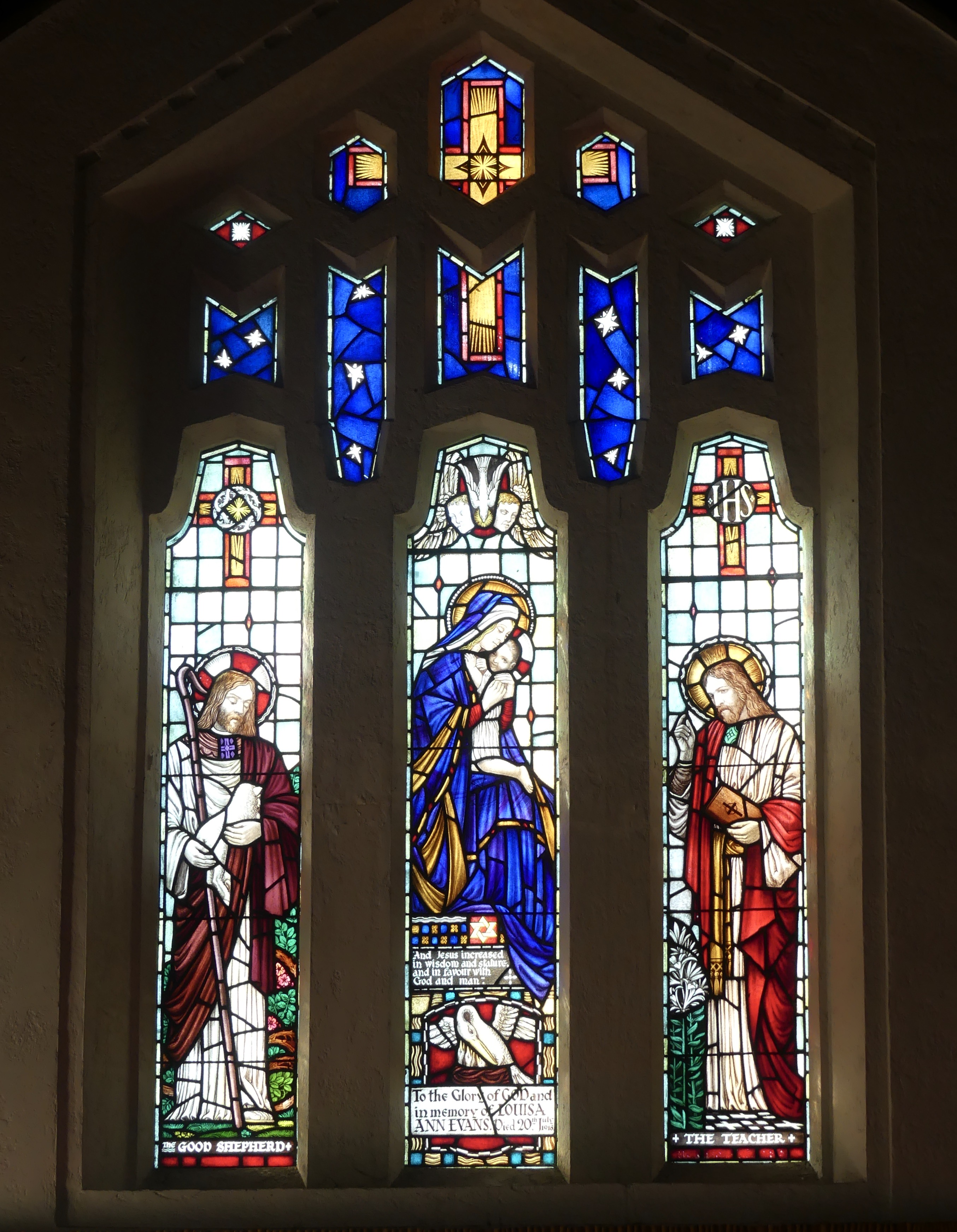
Stained glass window designed by Frederick Ellis

The Unemployment Board, under the United–Reform coalition Government of New Zealand, instituted a house-building subsidy scheme, to provide work to the unemployed. During 1935 the scheme was expanded from house-building to include churches, Sunday schools, public halls, libraries and other buildings for non-profit organisations. All Saints' church was one of only a handful of churches to be built using a subsidy under the scheme. The total cost was £4,142, with a ten per cent government subsidy.

The church has cavity walls of reinforced concrete, rimu roof timbers, joists and flooring. The Oamaru stone font was carved by Frederick Gurnsey, a frequent collaborator of Harman's. The use of unadorned concrete required Harman to adapt and simplify some forms, giving a modern appearance. Initial plans for the church show a roof of cedar shingles and a tower with a spire. However the church decided to replace the shingles with tile, which meant forgoing the spire.

The church contains a stained glass window designed by Wellington artist Frederick Vincent Ellis. The window commemorates Louisa Ann Evans, who died 20 July 1918, and had been instrumental in support efforts for soldiers during the war.

== Heritage status ==
The church is registered by Heritage New Zealand as a Category I structure, with registration number 5012. The listing recognises the church's importance as a landmark in a town with few medium- or high-rise buildings. It also states

"All Saints' may also be favourably compared with the Arts and Crafts-inspired work of contemporaries such as Cecil Wood. The church illustrates Harman's understanding and skilful exploitation of the qualities inherent in reinforced concrete and realised in solid form his belief that 'with a material such as concrete it is neither feasible nor desirable to imitate exactly features developed in wood or stone'."

== Notable members ==
Notable members of the congregation are:

- Bess Hudson (1875–1961), nurse
