= Nancy Russell =

Nancy Russell may refer to:

- Nancy Russell (speech teacher) (1909–1993), New Zealand speech teacher, journalist and drama critic
- Nancy Neighbor Russell (1933–2008), American conservationist
