= Thomas Harman =

Thomas Harman may refer to:

- Thomas Harman (writer) (fl. 1567), English writer known for A Caveat or Warning for Common Cursitors
- Thomas Harman (cricketer) (1861–1950), New Zealand cricketer
- Thomas W. Harman (c. 1807–1848), American attorney and militia officer from New York
- Tom Harman (born 1941), American politician from California
