= 1980 Birthday Honours (New Zealand) =

Awards list for New Zealand

The 1980 Queen's Birthday Honours in New Zealand, celebrating the official birthday of Elizabeth II, were appointments made by the Queen in her right as Queen of New Zealand, on the advice of the New Zealand government, to various orders and honours to reward and highlight good works by New Zealanders. They were announced on 14 June 1980.

The recipients of honours are displayed here as they were styled before their new honour.

== Knight Bachelor ==
- Alan Fleming Gilkison CBE – of Wānaka. For services to aviation, export industry and community.
- The Honourable John Richard Harrison ED MP – of Hawke's Bay, Speaker of the House of Representatives.
- Ralph Patrick Thompson – of Christchurch. For services to commerce and the community.
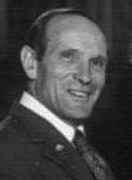
Sir Richard Harrison

== Order of the Bath ==
=== Companion (CB) ===
Military division

- Major General Brian Matauru Poananga CBE – Chief of General Staff.

== Order of Saint Michael and Saint George ==
=== Dame Commander (DCMG) ===
- Norma Janet, Lady Holyoake – of Government House, Wellington. For public services since 1935.
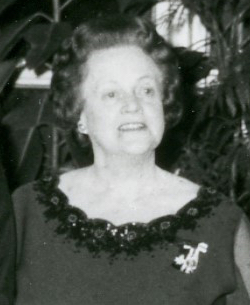
Dame Norma Holyoake

=== Companion (CMG) ===
- Howard Graham Fleming Callam – of Auckland. For services as chairman of the Totalisator Agency Board, and to the community.
- Frank Henry Corner – of Wellington; lately Secretary of Foreign Affairs.
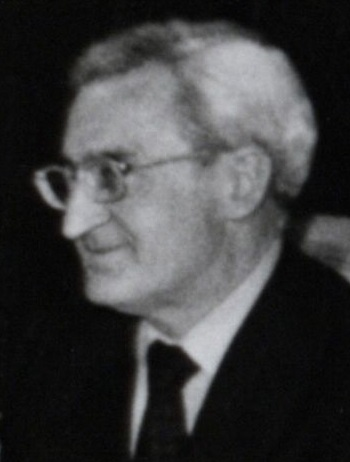
Frank Corner

== Order of the British Empire ==
=== Knight Commander (KBE) ===
Civil division

- Graham Stanley Latimer – of Taipuha, Northland; president of the New Zealand Māori Council.

=== Commander (CBE) ===
Civil division

- Kevin Nicholas McNamara – of Auckland. For services to surgery.
- Charles Stuart Masters – of Auckland. For political services.
- George Malcolm Peters – of Taitā; director-general, New Zealand Post Office, 1977–1979.
- John Graeme Sinclair Reid – of Auckland. For services to business management.
- Professor George Lancelot Rolleston – of Christchurch; dean, Christchurch Clinical School of the University of Otago.
- William Alexander Sutton – of Christchurch. For services to art.
- Horace Leslie Verry – of Wellington; lately general manager, New Zealand Press Association.
- Sheilah Maureen Winn – of Christchurch. For services to the arts.

=== Officer (OBE) ===
Civil division

- John Boyd-Clark – of Christchurch. For services to the wool industry and community.
- Ailsa Evelyn Densem – of Christchurch. For services to the playcentre movement.
- Helen June Patricia Evison – of Wellington. For services to the theatre.
- Ronald William Greenough – of Te Awamutu. For services to the dairy industry.
- Frank Albert Hardy QFSM – of Wellington; fire commissioner, New Zealand Fire Service.
- Victor Edwin Jaynes – of Wellington; lately director, External Intelligence Bureau, Prime Minister's Department.
- Sydney James Lavelle JP – of Auckland. For services to the community.
- Robert Stewart Lockwood JP – of Palmerston North. For services to the building industry.
- George Tuoro Marsden ED JP – of Hamilton. For services to the Māori people.
- Herbert James Poole – of Lower Hutt. For services to horticulture.
- Hollis Wilton Reed – of Wellington. For services to the community.
- Harry Leonard Riley MBE JP – of Golden Bay. For services to local government.
- Nancy Elizabeth Russell – of Hāwera. For services to speech and drama teaching.
- John Oswald Sanders – of Auckland. For services to the Bible College of New Zealand.
- Hugh Hunter Saunders – of Christchurch. For services to manufacturing and the community.
- Alan Raine Topham – of Auckland. For services to export.
- George Edward Twentyman – deputy assistant commissioner, New Zealand Police.

Military division

- Colonel James Alexander McArthur – Colonels' List, New Zealand Army.
- Lieutenant Colonel David William Stewart Moloney – Royal New Zealand Infantry Regiment.
- Group Captain Geoffrey Charles Hubbard – Royal New Zealand Air Force.

=== Member (MBE) ===
Civil division

- Beverley Doris Bennett – of Wellington. For services to art.
- Jack Breward – of Christchurch. For services to the Royal Life Saving Society and community.
- Colin Alexander Dickie – of Wellington. For services to athletics and art.
- Andrew Robert Dreaver ED – of Auckland. For services to the community.
- Maurice Raymond Duckmanton – of Christchurch. For services to swimming.
- Ralph Oliver Eagles JP – lately general manager, Auckland Education Board.
- William Elliott – of New Plymouth; superintendent, New Plymouth Prison.
- Alan Charlton Fraser – of Rangiora. For services to the community.
- Richard John Hadlee – of Christchurch. For services to cricket.
- Ralph James Iorns JP – of Golden Bay. For services to the community.
- Arthur Kennedy – of Tauranga. For services as a first-aid training officer in forestry industry.
- Ian Andrew Kirkpatrick – of Gisborne. For services to rugby.
- Eugene James Metge MacLoughlin – of Te Puke. For services to the kiwifruit industry.
- Lieutenant Commander Courtney Phillip Medland – of Paremata; New Zealand Cadet Forces.
- Ethel Margaret Millar – of Auckland; chief nursing officer, Auckland Hospital Board.
- Alfred Nevil Wells (Peter) Newton – of Rangiora. For services to literature.
- James Julius Nielsen – of Auckland; superintendent of traffic, Auckland City Council.
- Thelma Elsie Pearson – of Blenheim. For services to the community.
- Irene Mary Reid – of Ngakawau. For services to bowling.
- Thomas Michael Noel Rodgers – of Palmerston North. For services to the New Zealand Automobile Association and community.
- Edgar Pearce Rogers – of Tawa; private secretary to Ministers of Health, 1956–1979.
- Ortvin Sarapu – of Auckland. For services to chess.
- William David Skelton – of Levin. For services to horse racing as a jockey.
- Donald Murray Stafford – of Rotorua. For services to the preservation of Māori traditions and history.
- Henry Ellis Thomas Sutton – of Invercargill. For services to sport, music and the community.
- Beatrice Marion Webster – of Auckland. For services to music and singing.

Military division

- Lieutenant Commander Nicholas Terence Byrne – Royal New Zealand Navy.
- Warrant Officer Marine Engineering Artificer Arthur Wayne Hurndell – Royal New Zealand Navy.
- Warrant Officer Master at Arms John Joseph Watt – Royal New Zealand Navy.
- Major Gordon Crichton Forgie ED – Royal New Zealand Infantry Regiment (Territorial Force).
- Warrant Officer Class I Albert James Owen Hewlett – Royal New Zealand Infantry Regiment.
- Major Bruce Hill – Royal New Zealand Infantry Regiment.
- Warrant Officer Class I Selwyn Francis Ryder – Royal New Zealand Signals.
- Warrant Officer Russell John David McKay – Royal New Zealand Air Force.
- Squadron Leader Daniel Wakefield McLeod – Royal New Zealand Air Force.
- Warrant Officer Brian Kelvin Read – Royal New Zealand Air Force.
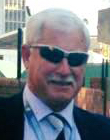
Richard Hadlee

== British Empire Medal (BEM) ==
Military division

- Petty Officer Radio Supervisor Rodney Michael Kevin Berry – Royal New Zealand Navy.
- Chief Petty Officer Control Electrical Artificer Leonard John Bilton – Royal New Zealand Navy.
- Staff Sergeant Keith Allan Inwood – Royal New Zealand Engineers.
- Sergeant Ian Leslie McKenzie – Royal New Zealand Electrical and Mechanical Engineers.
- Staff Sergeant Thomas Douglas Whitaker – Royal New Zealand Infantry Regiment.
- Flight Sergeant Rex William Johnson MBE – Royal New Zealand Air Force.
- Flight Sergeant Roger Wilfred Louis – Royal New Zealand Air Force.
- Sergeant Neville Roderick Clyde Simpson – Royal New Zealand Air Force.

== Companion of the Queen's Service Order (QSO) ==
=== For community service ===
- Emilie Bellwood – of Auckland.
- Yolande Elizabeth Lyell Gay JP – of Hamilton.
- Norman George Goffin – of Lower Hutt.
- Russell James Laurenson JP – of Lower Hutt.
- Noeline Mary McIlroy – of Christchurch.
- Peter Leonard Newberry – of Auckland.
- Huntly Stuart Skinner JP – of Dunedin.
- Mona Wikaira JP – of Kihikihi.

=== For public services ===
- Ian Lawrence Baumgart – of Lower Hutt; lately Commissioner for the Environment.
- Howard Byron Danby JP – of Thames.
- Ernest Dwyer – of Hastings.
- Gordon Glendinning Grieve – of Invercargill.
- Lorna Margaret Johnston – of Auckland.
- John Holdsworth Nairn – of Waipawa.
- William Henry Parr JP – of Nelson.
- Ronald George Russell JP – of Wanganui; mayor of Wanganui.
- John Bernard Thomas JP – of Reporoa.
- Wallace Emilie Walker JP – of Dunsandel; chairman, Ellesmere County Council, since 1959.
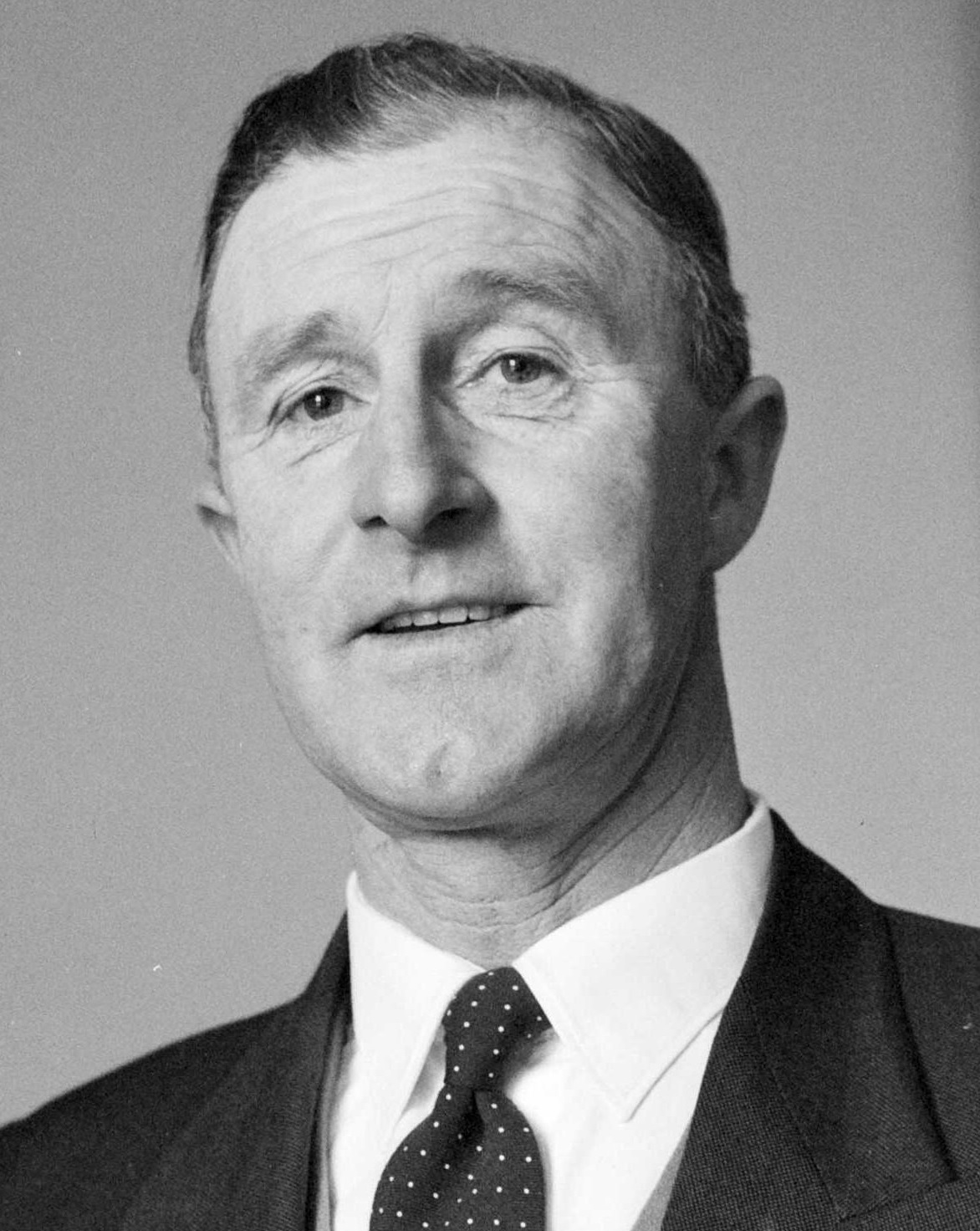
Gordon Grieve

== Queen's Service Medal (QSM) ==
=== For community service ===
- Audrea Eileen Beddie – of Christchurch.
- Margaret Clare Boyce – of Auckland.
- Alice Elizabeth Corballis – of Marton.
- Moe Alma Mary Dudfield – of Wellington.
- Thomas Mutu Ellison – of Otago.
- Violet Edith Fairweather – of Christchurch.
- Valerie Lorna Ferguson – of Hamilton.
- Molly Casement Persse Foster – of Auckland.
- Leslie Herbert Freeman – of Khandallah.
- Ripeka Huingariri Atawhai Wilcox George – of Bay of Islands.
- Cecilia Joan Andrews Greenwood – of Havelock North.
- Ruby Hannan – of Port Chalmers.
- Albert Charles Norman Harmer JP – of Auckland.
- Tihi Harris – of Northland.
- Kararaima Heke – of Rotorua.
- Punia Mollie Hotene JP – of Morrinsville.
- Norah Annie Humphreys – of Nelson.
- Arthur Tolson Inskeep – of Frankton.
- Mabel Elizabeth James – of Christchurch.
- Richard Malcolm Leach – of Waihi.
- Hazel Adelaide Lomax – of Northland.
- Adelaide Frances McLean – of Dunedin.
- Ian Nelson Menzies – of New Plymouth.
- Evan William Musgrove – of Blenheim.
- Eva Rennie – of Kaiapoi.
- Zella Roberts – of Auckland.
- Robert Hugh Rodgers – of Motueka.
- Lucy Dorset Taylor – of Wellington.
- Hinauri Strongman Tribole – of Utah, United States.
- Margaret Gertie Wall – of Dannevirke.
- Teoti Rupi Wawatai – of Gisborne.

=== For public services ===
- Dr Basil Ernest West Aldwell MC – of Gisborne.
- John Renata Blackman – of Te Kūiti.
- Dorothy Brenda Isabel Ruth Brown – of Invercargill.
- Nancy Margaret Caldwell JP – of Wainuiomata.
- Dora Kathleen Cathro – of Ngāruawāhia.
- Raymond William Cleland – of Wānaka; chief ranger, Mount Aspiring National Park, 1966–1979.
- Elsie Barrie Dillon – of Waipawa.
- Grahame Durston – of Auckland.
- Douglas Eccles Fleury – of Kimbolton.
- Thomas William Darcy Hughes – of Albany.
- Hugh Marchwell Jennings – of Gisborne.
- Patricia Mary Lockhart – of Wellington.
- Thomas Richard Alexander McCleary – of Christchurch.
- Tere Anini McGuire JP – of Hicks Bay.
- Alexander Robert McLay – senior constable, New Zealand Police.
- Richard Joseph O'Connell – sergeant, New Zealand Police.
- George Cyril Parish – of Auckland; lately senior education officer, Mount Eden Prison.
- Betty Alice Plant – of Wellington; lately curator, Old Saint Paul's Cathedral, New Zealand Historic Places Trust.
- Hoera Kewa Tika Ruru JP – of Te Karaka.
- Henry Richard Thorp – of Paeroa.
- Bryan Blake Wills JP – of Rotorua.

== Queen's Fire Service Medal (QFSM) ==
- Andrew Barr – of Papakura; lately volunteer senior station officer, Papakura Volunteer Fire Brigade.
- Garth Winston Bicknell JP – of Porirua; chief fire officer, Porirua Fire Brigade.
- Phillip Ernest O'Malley – of Waimate; chief fire officer, Waimate Volunteer Fire Brigade.

== Queen's Police Medal (QPM) ==
- Ross Phillip Dallow – inspector, New Zealand Police.
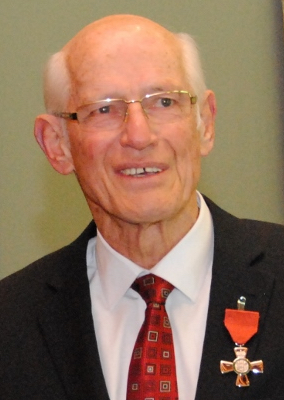
Ross Dallow

== Air Force Cross (AFC) ==
- Wing Commander Robin John Klitscher DFC – Royal New Zealand Air Force.

== Queen's Commendation for Valuable Service in the Air ==
- Squadron Leader Ian George Brunton – Royal New Zealand Air Force.
- Sergeant Peter Stanley Burton – Royal New Zealand Air Force.
