= Beverley Shore Bennett =

New Zealand portrait artist and glass artist (1928–2024)

Beverley Shore Bennett MBE
- Born: Beverley Doris Shore; 1928; Wellington, New Zealand
- Died: 3 September 2024 (aged 95); Waikanae, New Zealand
- Spouse: Peter Bennett (died 2002)
- Children: 3

Beverley Doris Shore Bennett MBE (nḗe Shore; 1928 – 3 September 2024) was a New Zealand portrait artist and glass artist. Her work is included in the collection of the New Zealand Portrait Gallery and she was a Fellow of the British Society of Master Glass Painters.

== Biography ==
Shore Bennett was born in Wellington to Edith Carter and Martin Shore. She attended Samuel Marsden Collegiate School from 1934 to 1945. Her art teacher there, Betty Rhind, gave her extra classes in portrait drawing. From 1946 to 1950, she attended Wellington Technical College where she studied under stained glass artist Frederick Ellis.

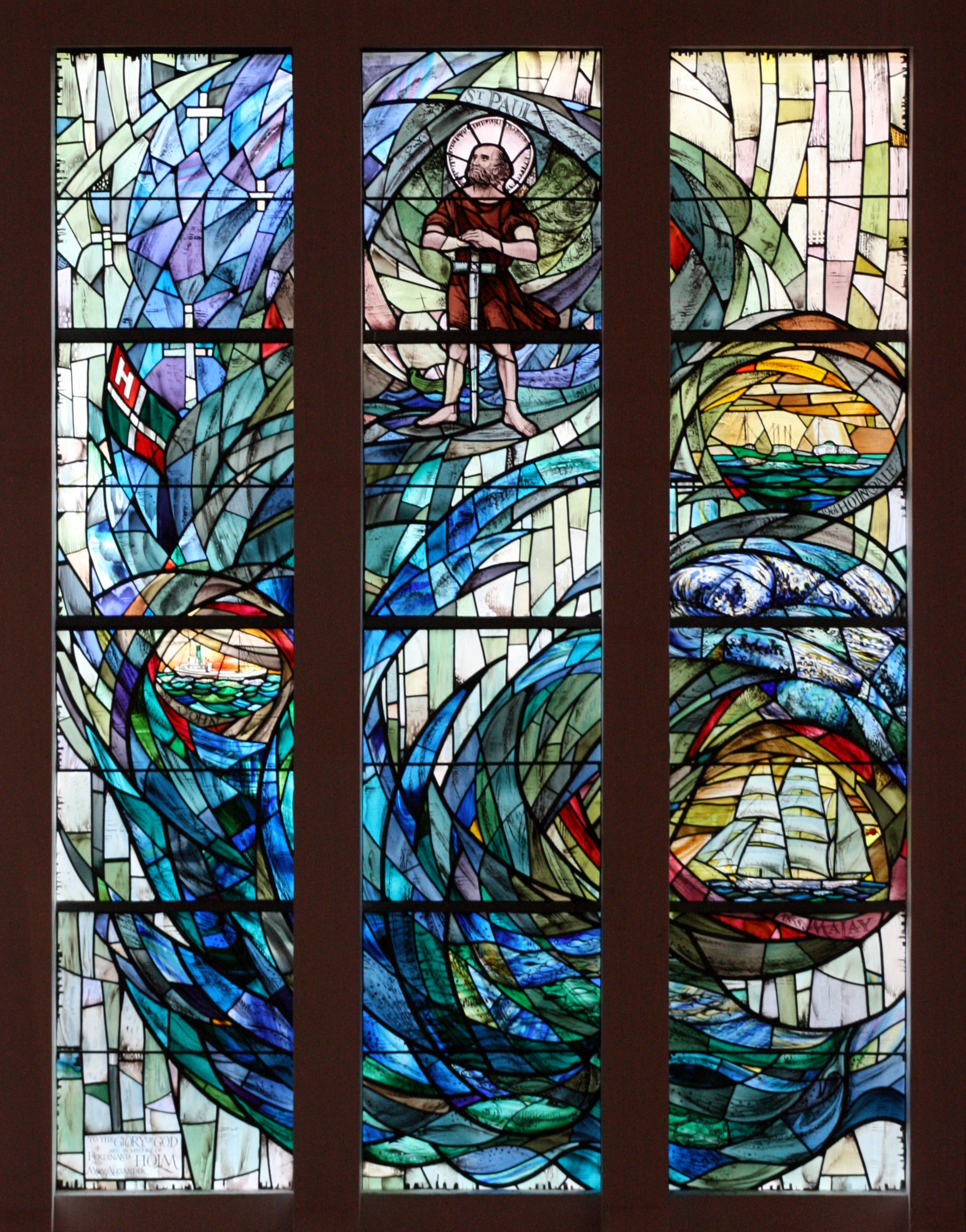
The Holm Memorial window, designed by Shore Bennett, at Wellington Cathedral of St Paul

In 1948, Shore Bennett joined the New Zealand Academy of Fine Arts, exhibiting her work there, and continued as an exhibiting member until 1967. She travelled to England and studied at the Byam Shaw School of Art from 1951 to 1953, majoring in portraiture. While there, she had two portraits accepted for the 1953 Royal Academy summer show.

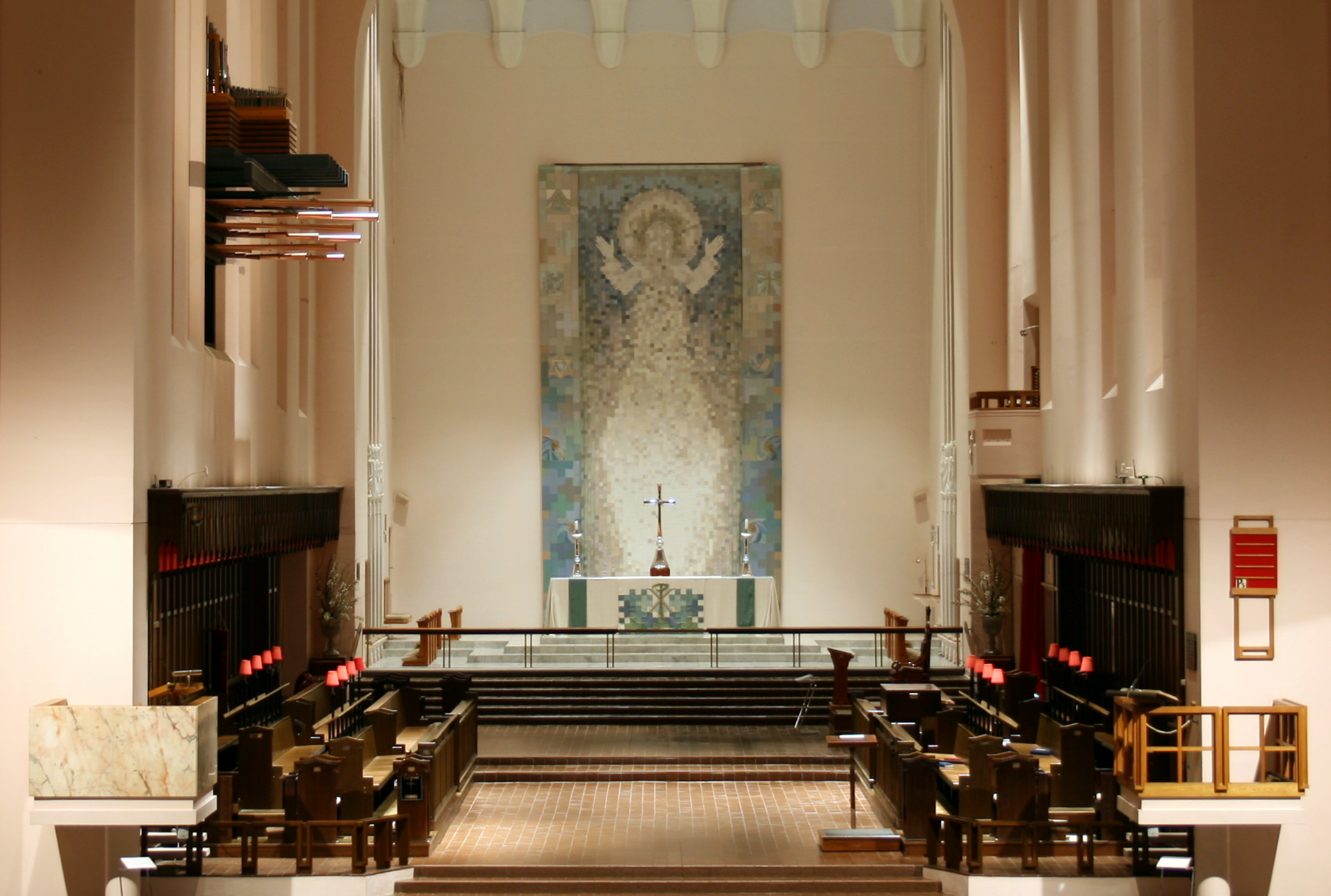
A dossal, designed by Shore Bennett, hanging behind the altar at Wellington Cathedral of St Paul

In 1953, Shore Bennett returned to New Zealand and started designing stained glass windows. In the early 1960s, she designed windows for Waiapu Cathedral of Saint John the Evangelist in Napier. At the dedication of the windows at Saint John's Cathedral, she said:

"Glass is not just beauty, but communication; it should lead you to ponder, recollect and be inspired by the great Christian truths."

Shore Bennett and Martin Roestenburg designed the windows in the Wellington Hospital Nurses' Memorial Chapel, which opened in 1965.

In 1969, she was asked to design the portable font for the Wellington Cathedral of St Paul by the dean, Walter Hurst, which then led to her being invited to design the Holm Memorial window for the cathedral. She later designed the cathedral's dossal hangings, which took her three years to make, and windows for the Lady Chapel and ambulatory. She also designed and fabricated church vestments.

In 1972, she was appointed a Fellow of the British Society of Master Glass Painters, becoming the first New Zealander to be accorded that honour. In the 1980 Queen's Birthday Honours, she was made a Member of the Order of the British Empire, for services to art.

It is estimated that over the course of her career, Shore Bennett designed between three and four hundred windows in churches, chapels and cathedrals around New Zealand. In 1974, she wrote the book, A Key to Embroidery, which has had two editions.

Shore Bennett was made a lay canon for the arts in the Anglican Diocese of Wellington in 1976, and later was a lay canon emeritus. She was involved with Zonta International: she was charter president of the Wellington Zonta Club and Australasian Governor of Zonta International from 1976 to 1978. From 1979 to 2008, she served on the board of management and trust board of Samuel Marsden Collegiate School.

Shore Bennett married Peter Osborne Bennett after she returned to New Zealand from Britain in the early 1950s. The couple had three daughters. Peter Bennett died in 2002. Shore Bennett lived in retirement in Waikanae, and died there on 3 September 2024, at the age of 95.
