= Annesley Harman =

New Zealand cricketer

Personal information
- Full name: Annesley Frederick George Harman
- Born: 10 November 1864; Christchurch, New Zealand
- Died: 18 June 1895 (aged 30); Christchurch, New Zealand
- Relatives: R. J. S. Harman (father); Richard Harman (brother); Thomas Harman (brother)

Domestic team information
- Years: Team
- 1889–90 to 1893–94: Canterbury

Career statistics
Competition	First-class
Matches	12
Runs scored	193
Batting average	8.77
100s/50s	0/0
Top score	45
Balls bowled	689
Wickets	16
Bowling average	16.75
5 wickets in innings	2
10 wickets in match	0
Best bowling	5/43
Catches/stumpings	8/–
- Source: Cricinfo, 21 November 2014

Annesley Frederick George Harman (10 November 1864 – 18 June 1895) was a cricketer who played first-class cricket for Canterbury from 1889 to 1894.

Annesley Harman was the third son of Richard James Strachan Harman, a leading Canterbury pioneer. He attended Christ's College, Christchurch, from 1875 to 1883, excelling in sport. When he left school he joined Harman and Stevens, the law firm of which his father was a partner.

For many years Harman was one of the leading batsmen in Christchurch senior club cricket, but perhaps owing to nerves he was unable to transfer this form to inter-provincial level. His best score in 12 matches for Canterbury was 45, the highest score on either side when Otago beat Canterbury by five wickets in 1891–92. He was sometimes more effective as a bowler, as in his first match for Canterbury when, having not bowled in Wellington's first innings, he took 5 for 43 in the second to help Canterbury to a 39-run victory.

Harman died of pneumonia in June 1895, aged 30. A stained-glass window in his memory was placed in St Michael's Church in Christchurch in August 1897.
