= Frederick Vincent Ellis =

New Zealand artist and art teacher (1892–1961)

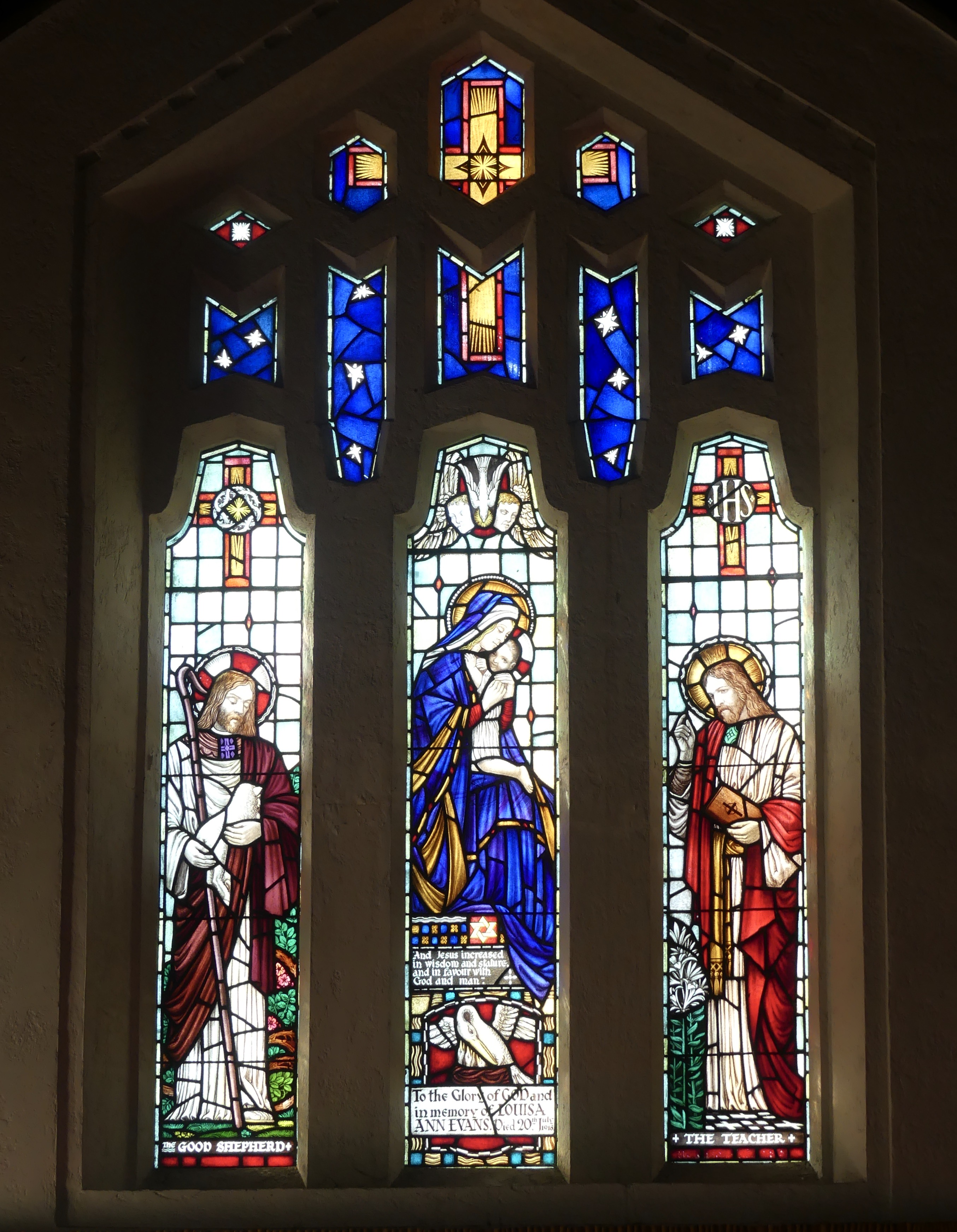
Ellis designed the stained glass window for All Saints' Church in Hokitika

Frederick Vincent Ellis (5 February 1892 – 8 November 1961) was a New Zealand artist and art teacher. His works of notable stained glass windows include the war memorial windows in the Auckland War Memorial Museum, the World War I memorial window in the Hunter Building of Victoria University of Wellington, and windows in the First Presbyterian Church, Dunedin, and Timaru Boys' High School.

== Background and war service ==
He was born in Halifax, West Yorkshire, England. He studied at the Halifax Technical College School of Art from 1909 to 1913, and gained distinction in drawing in the 1914 the Board of Education exams, being placed second in England. In 1914 he was awarded a scholarship to study at the Royal College of Art, London, but soon after entering his studies were postponed by the First World War. He served in France for four years as a gunner with the Duke of Wellington's West Yorkshire Regiment. Ellis suffered the effects of gas during the war.

== Qualifications and teaching ==
At the war's end, he returned to the Royal College and gained the Diploma of ARCA in 1921, also completing the teaching course. His studies at the Royal College included stained glass design under Professor Anning Bell and he executed several commissions before moving to New Zealand.

Following medical advice, he travelled to New Zealand early in 1922, taking up a three-year teaching position at King Edward Technical College School of Art in Dunedin as part of the La Trobe scheme. He was head of crafts, teaching drawing, etching, engraving and lettering. The intentions of the scheme were to raise the standards of art education in New Zealand and introduce more modern approaches to students. Other artists moving to New Zealand under the scheme included R. N. Field, Francis Shurrock, Christopher Perkins and Roland Hipkins.

Ellis married Elizabeth Bunbury in 1926 and moved to Wellington, having joined the staff of N.Z. Railways Publicity Studios.

He taught evening classes in life drawing and design from 1927 to 30 at the Wellington Technical College School of Art, and became a full-time tutor at the School from 1930. He was appointed head of department in 1939, a position he held until retiring in 1959. He died in Lower Hutt on 8 November 1961.

== Artworks ==
His New Zealand career saw many more windows designed, both in ecclesiastical and secular areas. The most notable include the war memorial windows in the Auckland War Memorial Museum, the World War I memorial window in the Hunter Building of Victoria University of Wellington, and windows in the First Presbyterian Church, Dunedin, and Timaru Boys' High School. His church windows are to be found throughout New Zealand. Etchings, lithographs, statues, and paintings in oil and watercolour also testify to his wide range of skills. He was a regular exhibitor in the Academy of Fine Arts shows in Wellington.

== Notable students ==
Ellis' notable ex-pupils include Vivian Lynn (1944–45), Valerie Beere, John Drawbridge, Alan Pearson, Don Peebles, Beverley Shore Bennett, Guy Ngan and Gordon Walters. Many consider that Ellis contributed in no small measure to the artistic development and appreciation of many people in his adopted country.
