= Betty Rhind =

New Zealand artist and art teacher (1892–1965)

Betty Rhind (1892–1965) was a New Zealand artist and art teacher.

== Biography ==
Rhind was born in Wellington. She was an art teacher at Samuel Marsden Collegiate School and taught portraiture to Beverley Shore Bennett. Bennett's portrait of Rhind is included in the collection of the New Zealand Portrait Gallery.
