= Bess Hudson =

(1875–1961), early nurse in Hokitika, New Zealand

- Born: Elizabeth Mary Hudson; 28 April 1875; Hokitika, New Zealand
- Died: 7 May 1961 (aged 86); Hokitika, New Zealand
- Occupation: Nurse

Elizabeth Mary Hudson (28 April 1875 – 7 May 1961) was an early nurse in Hokitika on the West Coast of the South Island of New Zealand.

== Early life and family ==
Hudson was born in Hokitika on 28 April 1875, the second daughter of Mary Hudson (née Higgins) and John Robert Hudson. Her father opened the first store in Hokitika, in 1864.

== Career ==
Hudson spent her whole life in Hokitika. She began nursing in 1900, against her parents' wishes, in a private hospital. Hudson worked for Dr Ebenezer Teichelmann (1859–1938), who was also the superintendent of Hokitika Hospital, and so she did relieving shifts there. Her pay at starting was five shillings per week. Hudson worked long hours, on call from 6am until midnight, but commented, "I was always there, whenever I was wanted". As Teichelmann was the only doctor in Hokitika for many years, Hudson would take charge of his surgery when he was unavailable, but require patients return to see the doctor later. She was also required to assist in many procedures in rural areas around the town, when the patient was too unwell to be moved, and was familiar with tonsil removal, lancing of abscesses and amputation of fingers. On one occasion, doctor and nurse used a railway jigger to attend a patient down the line during the night. As an unofficial district nurse, Hudson mostly travelled by buggy, and became proficient at wound dressing.

Hudson took on private nursing before retiring. She was a keen and active member of the congregation of All Saints' Church.

== Death ==
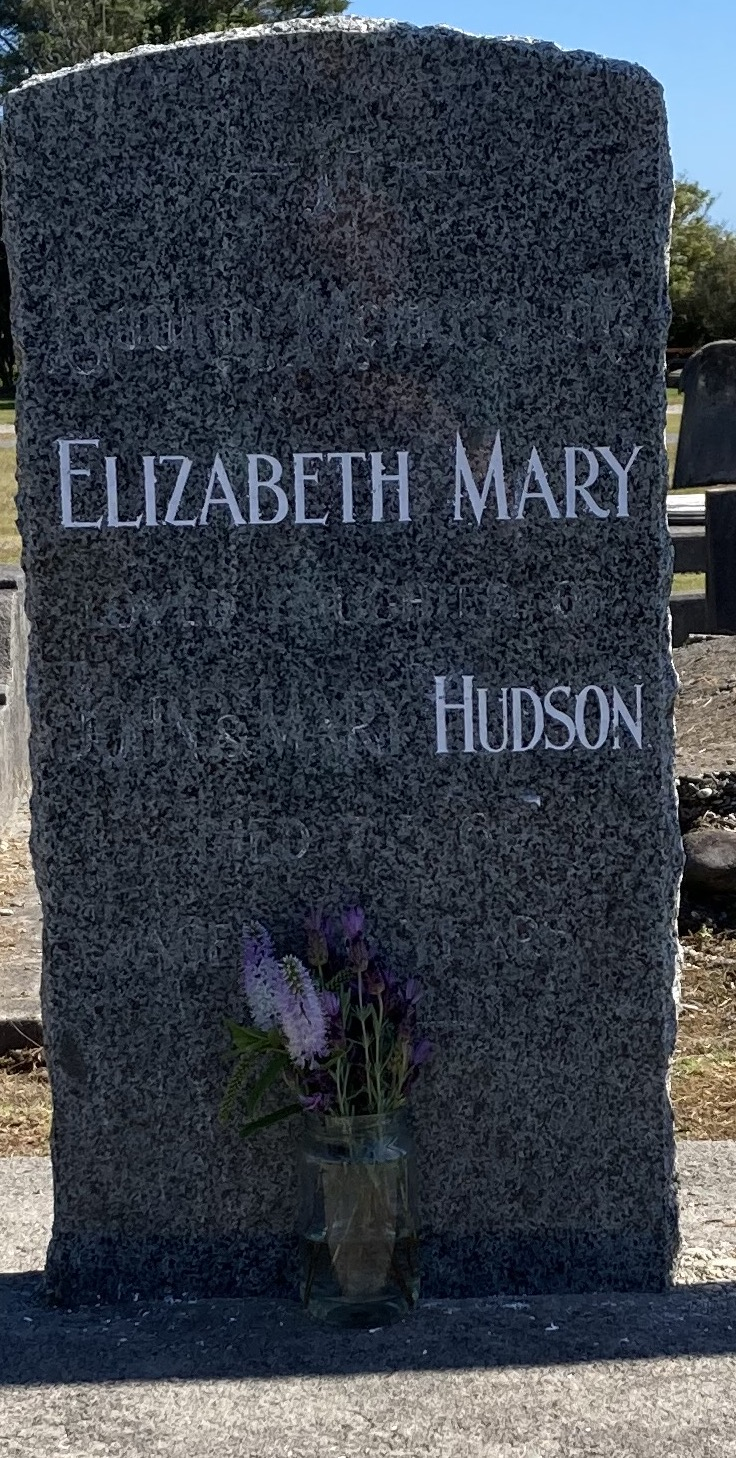
Hudson's gravestone in Hokitika Cemetery

Hudson died at Westland Hospital on 7 May 1961, aged 86, and was buried with her parents at Hokitika Cemetery. Her death was considered to sever one of the last remaining links to the earliest days of Hokitika.
