= Richard Harman (cricketer) =

New Zealand cricketer, tennis player, and architect

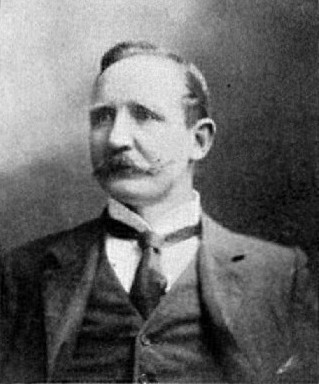

Personal information
- Full name: Richard Dacre Harman
- Born: 3 June 1859; Christchurch, New Zealand
- Died: 26 December 1927 (aged 68); Christchurch, New Zealand
- Relatives: R. J. S. Harman (father); Annesley Harman (brother); Thomas Harman (brother)

Domestic team information
- Years: Team
- 1883–84 to 1896–97: Canterbury

Career statistics
Competition	First-class
Matches	9
Runs scored	135
Batting average	8.43
100s/50s	0/1
Top score	61
Balls bowled	12
Wickets	0
Bowling average	–
5 wickets in innings	0
10 wickets in match	0
Best bowling	–
Catches/stumpings	1/–
- Source: CricketArchive, 25 April 2019

Richard Dacre Harman (3 June 1859 – 26 December 1927) was a New Zealand cricketer, tennis player and architect.

Harman was one of the 15 children of the Canterbury pioneer Richard James Strachan Harman and his wife Emma. After training as an architect he joined the established Christchurch firm of Armson Collins, and later became partner, when the firm's name changed to Armson, Collins and Harman. While working with the firm he designed many of Christchurch’s major buildings.

He was a prominent sportsman. He represented Canterbury at rugby, and played first-class cricket for Canterbury from 1884 to 1897. His performances in senior club cricket gave him the "reputation as one of Canterbury's best batsmen", though his first-class batting was less successful. In a club match in December 1881 he scored the first century at the newly-constructed Lancaster Park ground. He also umpired five first-class matches at Lancaster Park between 1887 and 1898.

Harman was one of the leading tennis players in New Zealand. He won the New Zealand men's singles title in 1891–92, and won the doubles title five times between 1887 and 1894 with his partner Frederick Wilding and once with D. Collins in 1895–96. He won the Canterbury Championships singles title six times between 1888 and 1900.

Harman married Alice Spooner in Christchurch in October 1895. He died in December 1927, leaving his widow.
