= Roy Lovell-Smith =

New Zealand architect (1884–1972)

Lovell-Smith in 1924

Leonard Roy Lovell-Smith (born Leonard Roy Smith; 26 September 1884 – 25 April 1972) was a New Zealand architect.

== Early life and family ==
Leonard Roy Smith was born in Christchurch on 26 September 1884, the son of the printer and stationer William Sidney Smith and his wife Mary Jane (Jennie) Smith (née Cumberworth). The family later changed their surname to Lovell-Smith. His siblings included feminist and community worker Kitty Lovell-Smith, artist and writer Edgar Lovell-Smith, and artist Colin Lovell-Smith.

== Career ==
Lovell-Smith served articles with A.H. Hart and qualified as an architect in 1905, establishing his own practice that year, as well as becoming the youngest associate member thus far of the newly formed New Zealand Institute of Architects.

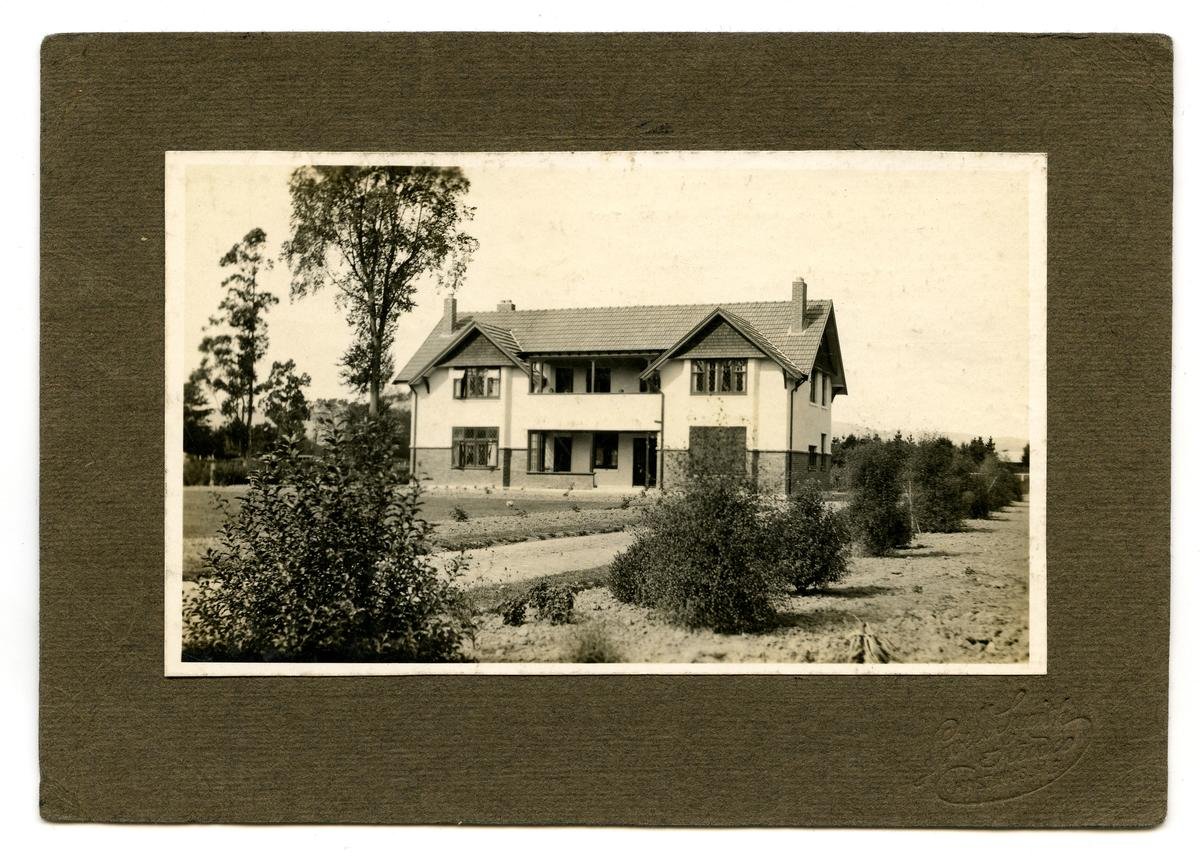
Midway, designed by Lovell-Smith, in 1921

Lovell-Smith's parents were friends of Kate Shepard, and she provided the funds with which the family home "Midway", on Middleton Road in Riccarton, was built in 1920. Lovell-Smith designed it in the English Domestic Revival style, and lived there in the 1930s and again after his conversion of it into flats in 1949. Lovell-Smith joined the Valuation Department of the State Advances Corporation in 1933, becoming the district property supervisor before retiring in 1939. He still continued in private practice, and was particularly known for ecclesiastical and residential buildings.

Churches designed by Lovell-Smith include St Ninian's Presbyterian Church, Riccarton (1926), St Paul's Presbyterian Church, Timaru (1926), a carved chapel at Te Waipounamu School (1926), St John's Methodist Church, Bryndwr (1928), St Andrew's Church in Hokitika (1931), St Kentigern's Anglican Church in Ataahua (1933) and the Kaiapoi Methodist Co-operating Church (1934). Significant residential properties include the former Methodist Parsonage in Kaiapoi (1914), and the landmark Skellerup House in Christchurch.

== Death ==
Lovell-Smith died on 25 April 1972, and he was buried at Waimairi Cemetery, Christchurch.
