= New Plymouth Prison =

Heritage prison building in New Plymouth, New Zealand

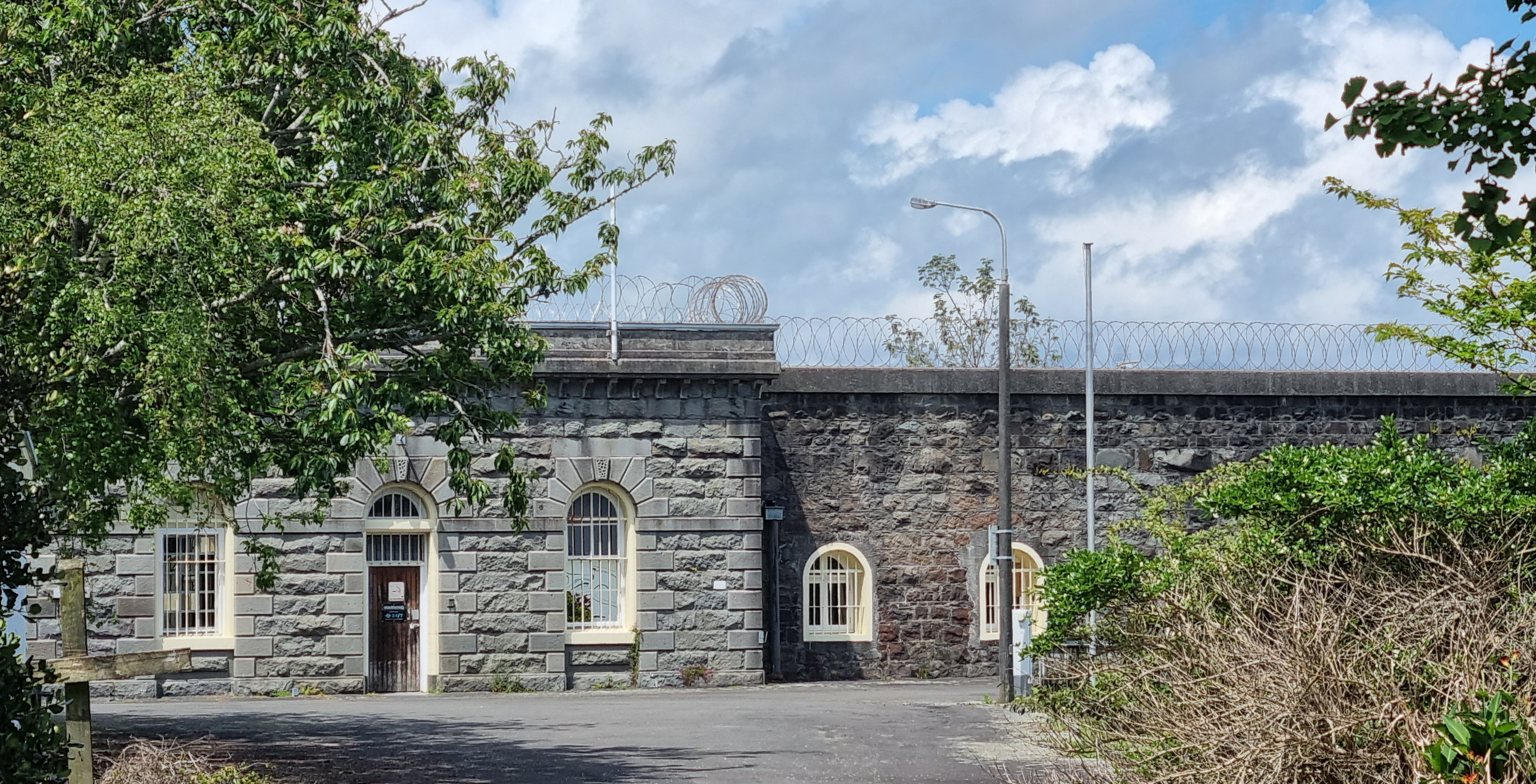
- New Plymouth Prison
- Interactive map of New Plymouth Prison
- Location: New Plymouth, New Zealand; 39.063727°S 174.073120°E
- Status: decommissioned
- Opened: 1880
- Closed: March 2013

Heritage New Zealand – Category 1
- Official name: New Plymouth Prison
- Designated: 13 August 2009
- Reference no.: 903

The New Plymouth Prison, also known as Marsland Hill Prison, is a decommissioned correctional facility in New Plymouth, New Zealand, registered as a Category 1 historic place by Heritage New Zealand. Prior to its closure, it was the oldest operational prison in New Zealand, with roots dating back to a wooden military hospital built in the 1850s. The prison is considered a place of high cultural and historical importance due to its association with penal reform in New Zealand, and its layout reflecting 19th-century punishment policies.

== History ==
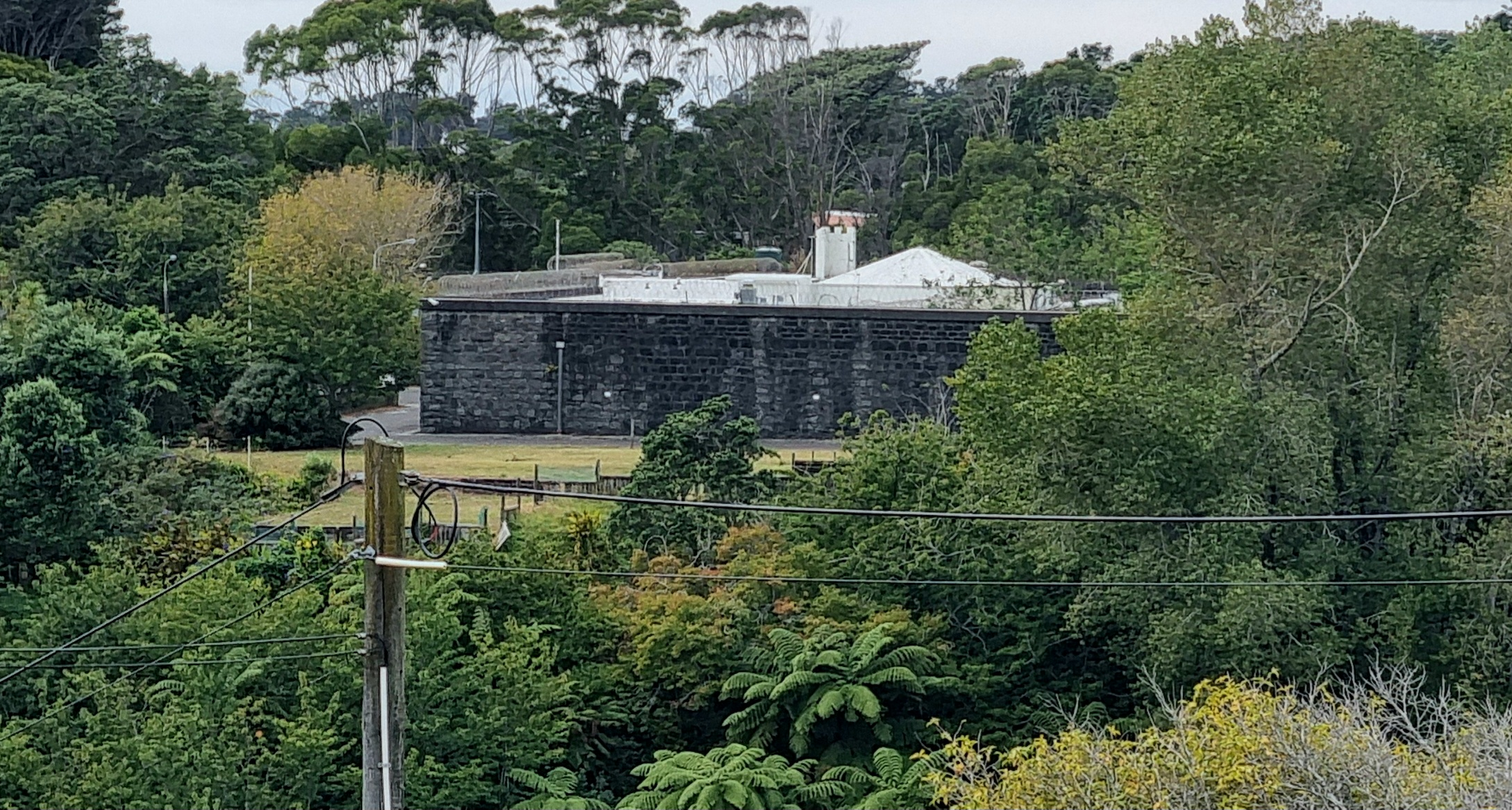
New Plymouth Prison on Marsland Hill

The New Plymouth Prison was converted from a 1850s wooden military hospital, originally built on Marsland Hill, the former Maori stronghold of Pukaka Pa, in New Plymouth Central. The hill was the place of the former military barracks, where the British troops were stationed in a stockade, in 1855, during the New Zealand Wars. The hospital cared for the injured imperial troops during the Taranaki Wars, but after the troops withdrew, it was repurposed as a district jail in 1870.

Colonial Architect William Clayton then imagined a grand, radial Central Prison for New Plymouth, an ambitious, English‑inspired separate‑confinement institution that never rose from the hill, undone by local protest and political upheaval. Instead, the old Marsland Hill gaol was steadily rebuilt. The works to convert the building into a more secure facility started in 1879. Clayton’s design ideas likely influenced the redevelopment, despite later claims that the design was “entirely” Gaoler William Bosworth’s. The wooden structure was reinforced with iron cladding and cement floors over stone rubble to enhance security. It included cells (mostly for men, with a few for women), kitchen, dining, ablution, chapel facilities, and accommodation for the jailers' families. Prisoners engaged in hard labour, such as breaking stones from a nearby quarry, a practice that lasted until the late 1950s.

The refurbished prison reopened in 1880, with construction continuing into 1904. The exterior walls were heightened between 1900–1915, other minor additions and alterations were made throughout its operational life, but the core structure and layout have remained largely intact.

Between 1917 and 1954, the prison was used as a specialised facility for men convicted of homosexual offences, a period now regarded as a failed penal experiment.

In March 2013, the 140-years-old prison was closed because it was deemed an earthquake risk and no longer met modern humanitarian standards for prisoner housing. The Department of Corrections commissioned a Conservation Plan for the site.

Now, the site is owned and managed by Land Information New Zealand (LINZ) while it undergoes the disposal process under the Public Works Act.

== Description ==
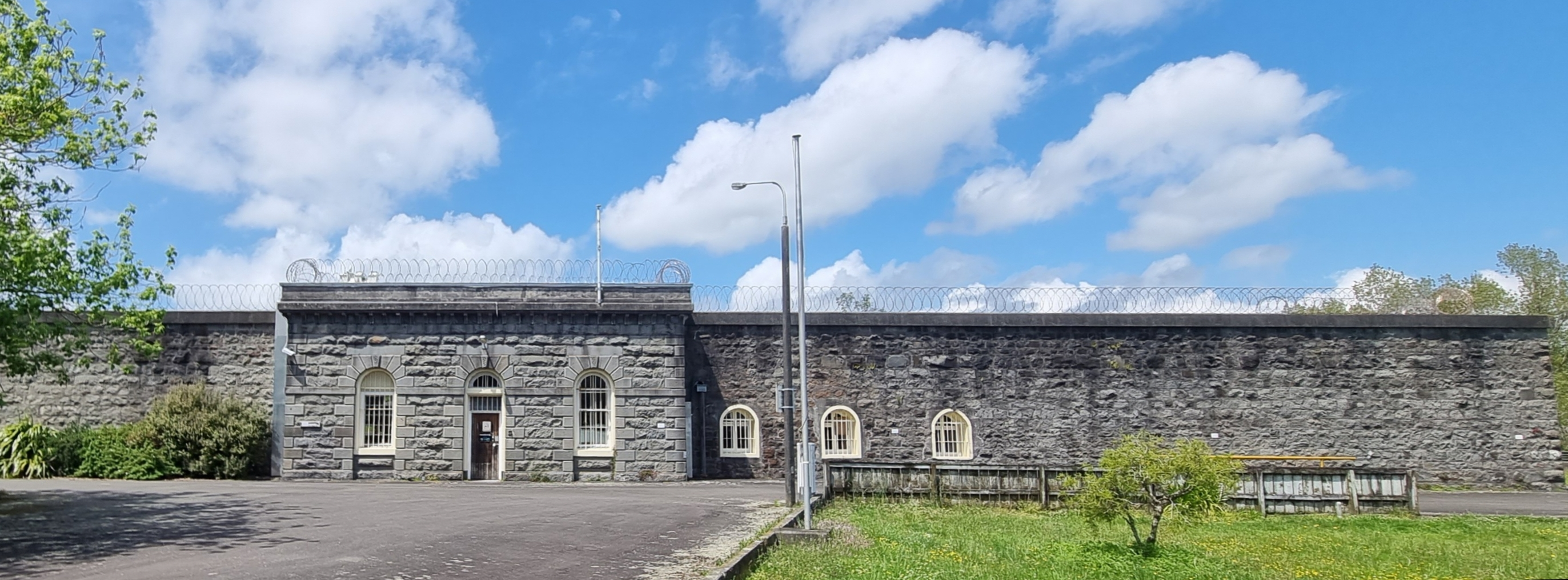
New Plymouth Prison

The old New Plymouth Prison sits on a leveled platform against the southern flank of Marsland Hill, where the land drops toward the Huatoki River. The prison is known for its Victorian penitentiary design, its frightening bluestone walls, well-preserved interior evoking a sense of the harsh discipline experienced by its inmates, and the very small cells, measuring approximately 2 metres by 3 metres.

The prison's design reflects 19th-century penal reform ideas by John Howard, emphasising classification and separate confinement to encourage reform and prevent the emergence of a criminal class. Captain Arthur Hume, Inspector-General of prisons, implemented these ideas in New Zealand, leading to the expansion of the prison from 1879 with three separate wings.

The prison compound is rectangular. The northern façade is marked by an arched doorway, barred windows, and finely worked stonework. Inside, three narrow wings radiate from a central hub known as “The Dome”. Each corridor is vaulted, lined with small, high‑ceilinged cells lit only by high windows and watched through tin‑sheathed doors with iron viewing ports. Open yards lie to the south, simple tar sealed spaces enclosed by the same stones. Around the original block, there are the later additions, like the 1960s brick unit, workshops and service rooms to the east, and a modern accommodation block linked by corridor to the old prison. A nursery shed and a modest warder’s cottage complete the cluster. The site includes remnants of quarrying activity, original flagstones, and architectural elements like corbel courses and drill marks on stone blocks.
