= Thomas Harman (cricketer) =

New Zealand cricketer (1861–1950)

Personal information
- Full name: Thomas de Renzy Harman
- Born: 3 February 1861; Christchurch, New Zealand
- Died: 21 April 1950 (aged 89); Christchurch, New Zealand
- Relatives: R. J. S. Harman (father); Richard Harman (brother); Annesley Harman (brother)

Domestic team information
- Years: Team
- 1882–83 to 1901–02: Canterbury

Career statistics
Competition	First-class
Matches	12
Runs scored	223
Batting average	11.15
100s/50s	0/2
Top score	65
Balls bowled	56
Wickets	1
Bowling average	27.00
5 wickets in innings	0
10 wickets in match	0
Best bowling	1/1
Catches/stumpings	7/–
- Source: CricketArchive, 1 December 2019

Thomas de Renzy Harman (3 February 1861 – 21 April 1950) was a New Zealand cricketer who played first-class cricket for Canterbury from 1882 to 1901. He worked as a lawyer.

== Life and career ==
Thomas Harman was one of several sons of Richard James Strachan Harman, a leading Canterbury pioneer. He attended Christ's College, Christchurch. He worked as a solicitor, first in partnership in the firm Maude and Harman, then after 1909 on his own. In 1924 he formed a partnership with his son Annesley, T. D. Harman and Son. He was also a director of the Christchurch Building Society for more than 40 years.

A middle-order batsman, Harman made his highest score in Canterbury's match against Wellington in 1891–92, when, captaining the team, he scored 15 and 65, Canterbury's highest score in the match. His brothers Richard and Annesley also played first-class cricket for Canterbury. When the New Zealand Cricket Council was formed in 1894, Harman was elected the inaugural treasurer.

Harman was a fine all-round sportsman. He played representative rugby union for Canterbury, and twice won the New Zealand men's long jump title at the national athletic championships, in 1888 and 1890. He was one of the founders of the Christchurch Golf Club, and helped to select the site for the links; he was later a founder of the Russley Golf Club, also in Christchurch.

On 17 October 1895, at St John's Church, Roslyn, Dunedin, Harman married Jenny Cook. He lived all his life in Christchurch, and died there in April 1950, aged 89, survived by Jenny and two sons and a daughter.
