= St Andrew's United Church =

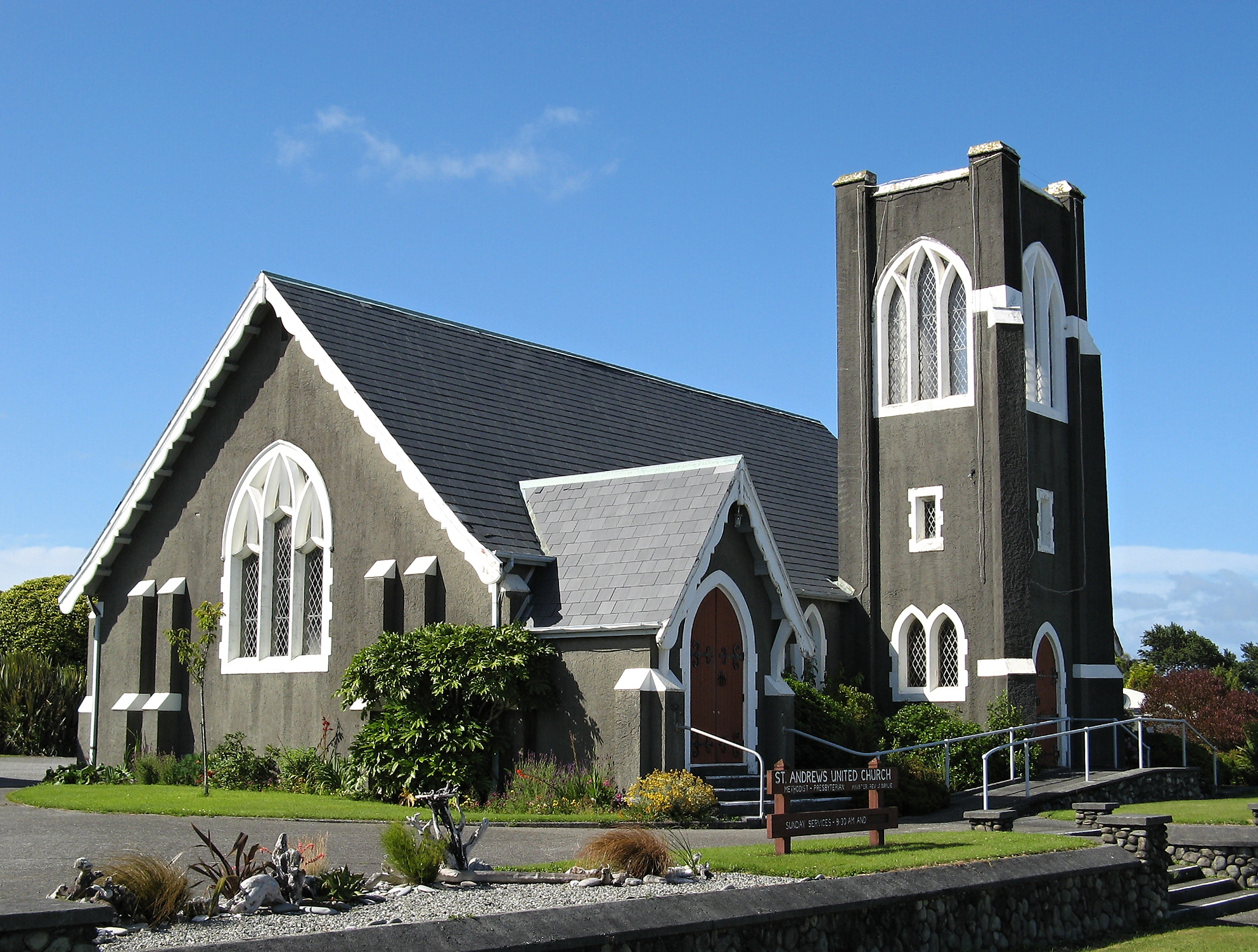
- St Andrew's United Church, Hokitika
- St Andrew's United Church
- 42°42′55.6″S 170°58′7.3″E
- Location: 66 Hampden Street and Fitzherbert Street, Hokitika
- Country: New Zealand
- Denomination: Presbyterian/Methodist

History
- Status: Parish church

Architecture
- Functional status: Active
- Heritage designation: Category I
- Designated: 28 June 1990
- Architect: Roy Lovell-Smith
- Architectural type: Gothic
- Groundbreaking: 19 July 1919
- Completed: 24 November 1935
- Construction cost: £2,540

Specifications
- Materials: Reinforced concrete, roughcast plaster

St Andrew's United Church, previously the Scot's Memorial Church, in Hokitika, New Zealand, is a Presbyterian/Methodist United church. It is a Category I registered building on the West Coast of New Zealand.

== Background ==
The first St Andrew's Church in Hokitika was built in February 1867, following the arrival of the first minister of the Hokitika parish, Reverend John Gow. It was a wooden building with a prominent spire, sited on Stafford Street.

In 1919, the congregation of St Andrew's elected to build a new church, to be known as the Scot's Memorial Church, to honour the contribution of Westland Scots who died in the First World War and as an offering to God for the Allied victory. A ground-breaking ceremony was held on Peace Day in 1919, although the church was eventually built on a different site.

An architect was not commissioned until 1931, when Roy Lovell-Smith completed his design. Construction was then delayed by both the choice of site and financial problems. Tenders were finally called In January 1935, and a month later the tender for £2,450 from J.O. Grant of Christchurch was accepted. The church was officially opened on 24 November 1935, at a final cost of just over £2,540.

The original church building of 1867 was used as a Sunday School, until it was demolished in 1946. In 1941, a booklet describing the history of the church was published to celebrate the 75th anniversary.

In 1970, the Presbyterian St Andrew's Church united with the Methodist church to form St Andrew's United Parish.

== Construction ==
The church is built in the Gothic style with a minimum of interior ornamentation. The tower is notable for having wide Gothic arch windows on four sides.

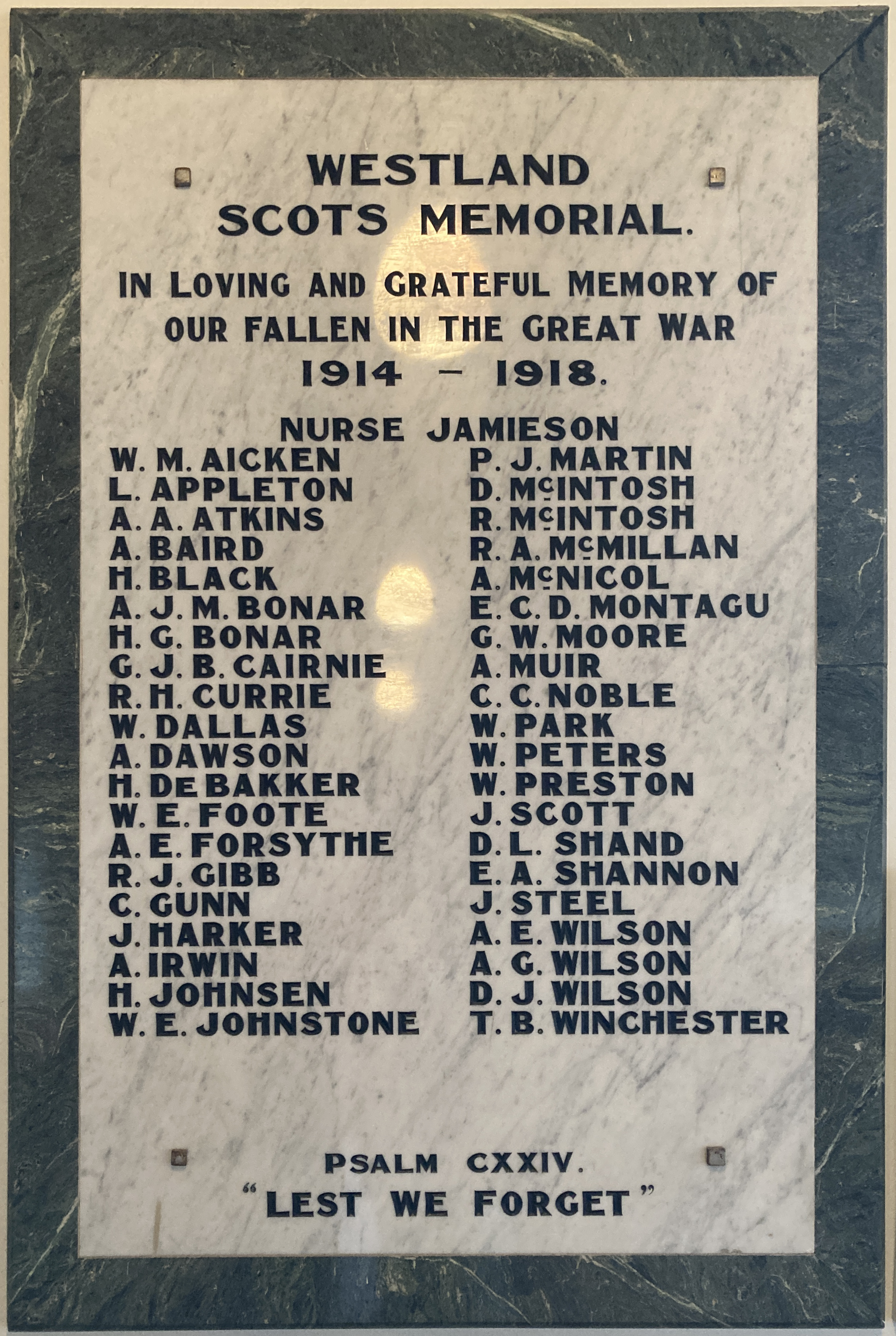
The Westland Scots Memorial inside St Andrew's Church

The church is built of reinforced concrete, with double walls and exterior roughcast cement plaster. The roof is slate with wooden bargeboards. The interior walls are plastered, and the ceiling and interior fittings, all designed by the architect, are of oiled rimu.

The church contains the Westland Scots Memorial, a marble roll of honour listing forty locals fallen in the First World War.

== Current status ==
The church is registered by Heritage New Zealand as a Category I structure, with registration number 5013. The listing recognises the importance of St Andrew's as the first Presbyterian congregation to be established on the West Coast, and the church as a visible symbol of that, as well as a memorial. Further, the listing describes the building as a fine example of a small Gothic style parish church, and acknowledges its importance as a local landmark. The Roll of Honour in the church is 'very fine'.
