= Nancy Russell (speech teacher) =

New Zealand speech teacher, producer (1909–1993)

Nancy Elizabeth Russell OBE (née Kent, 28 December 1909 – 10 February 1993) was a notable New Zealand speech teacher, journalist, drama critic and producer. She was born in Eltham, New Zealand, in 1909.

In the 1980 Queen's Birthday Honours, Russell was appointed an Officer of the Order of the British Empire, for services to speech and drama teaching.
