= Richard James Strachan Harman =

New Zealand civil engineer (1826–1902)

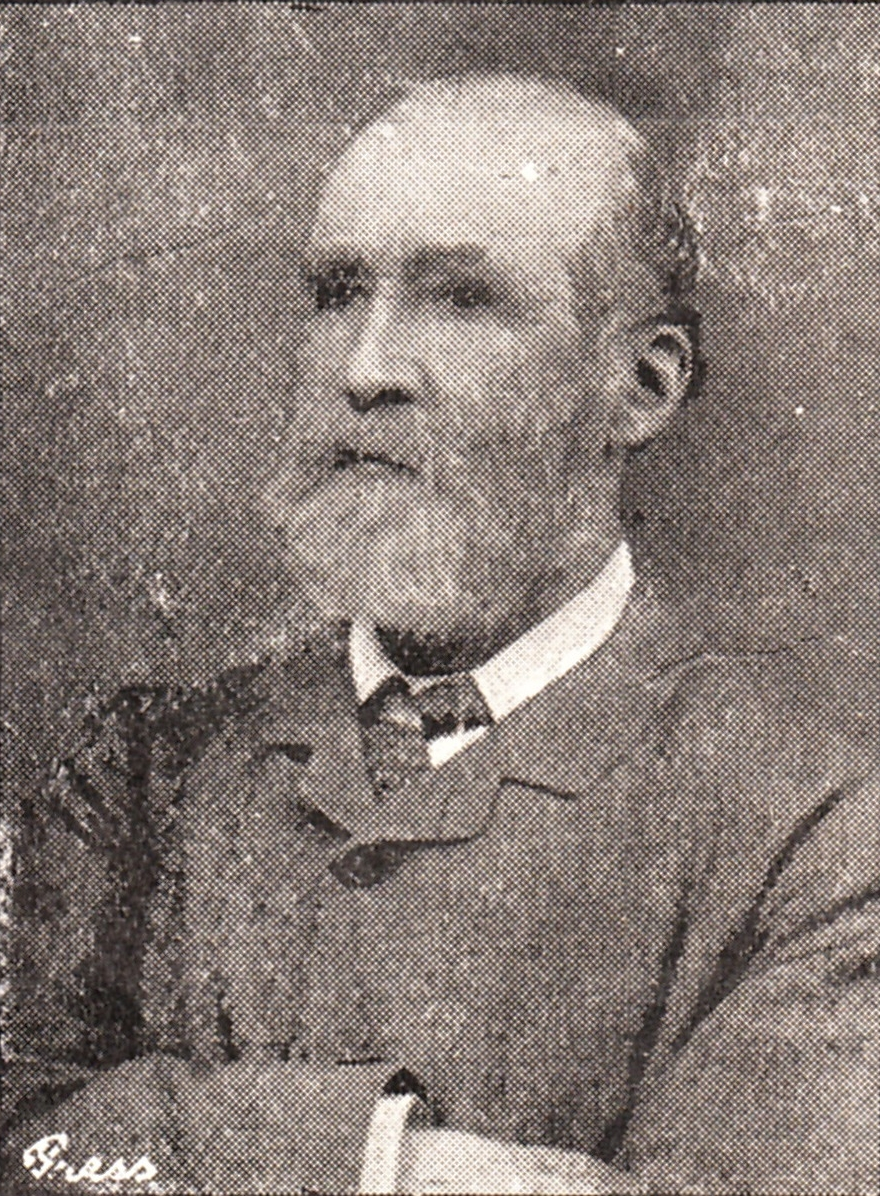
Portrait of Harman

Richard James Strachan Harman (14 April 1826 – 26 November 1902) was trained as a civil engineer. However, in Christchurch, New Zealand, he worked as a bureaucrat, politician and businessman. He was one of the Canterbury Pilgrims, having arrived in Lyttelton, on Sir George Seymour, one of the First Four Ships. He was a business partner of Edward Cephas John Stevens and senior partner of Harman and Stevens, and together they took financial control of the Christchurch newspaper The Press from its original proprietor, James FitzGerald, over a protracted period. Harman held many important roles with the Canterbury Provincial Council and was the last Deputy-Superintendent.

== Early life ==
Harman was born in Dublin in 1826, the son of Richard Harman. He was educated at Rugby School under Dr Thomas Arnold, and at King's College London. He was a pupil of George and Sir John Rennie, the London engineers, and he graduated as a civil engineer.

== Professional life ==
Soon afterwards, he emigrated to New Zealand, arriving in Lyttelton on 17 December 1850 by the ship Sir George Seymour. He lived in Canterbury except for one period. Between 1854 and 1856, he was emigration agent in London for the Canterbury Province. With the financial assistance of long-standing friends of Canterbury, John Robert Godley and Henry Selfe, he established emigration to the province. The first ship which he sent out was the Grasmere in 1855. The sixth, and last, which brought him back to Lyttelton, in 1856, was the Egmont.

Harman had already established himself in business in 1851 as a land and estate agent, and as agent for absentee land owners. He was joined in that business in 1862 by the Hon. Edward Cephas John Stevens.

Harman was one of the original land purchasers in Christchurch. In February 1851, he took up rural section (RS) 58, which had an area of 50 acres (20 ha); rural sections were numbered in the order in which they were assigned to land holders. Harman and the surveyor Cyrus Davie took up land between Lake Ellesmere and the Selwyn River. In May 1853, they purchased Run 82, and in the following month, they bought the adjoining Run 53 from James Stuart-Wortley. In 1862, they took up Run 426, which gave them access to the lake. Much of the land was freeholded by them, and Harman sold his holding in the late 1870s.

=== The Press ===
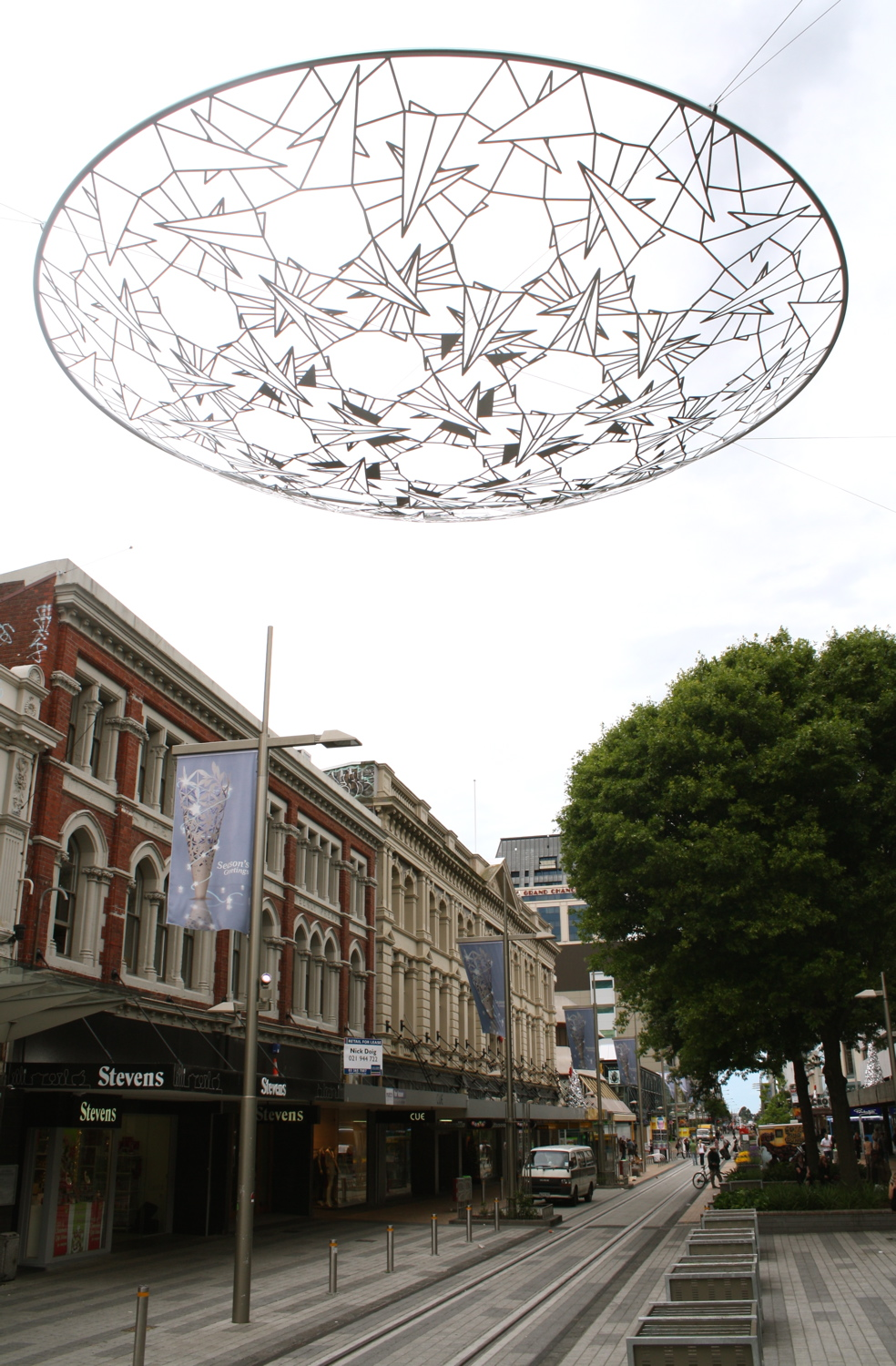
Former Press Building in Cashel Street, in use by the newspaper until 1908. Harman and Stevens took over the land from James FitzGerald in 1872

Harman was part of the committee that decided on the establishment of The Press, a newspaper first published on 25 May 1861. The intellectual brain of this venture was James FitzGerald, who had been the first editor of the Lyttelton Times. Fitzgerald, who had retired from the Lyttelton Times in 1853, was opposed to the proposed tunnel project for reasons of fiscal irresponsibility, but his old newspaper was one of the project's chief supporters. The Lyttelton Times' editor, Crosbie Ward, made an imputation of unknown content, and this spurred FitzGerald to set up The Press as a rival newspaper. In February 1862, an attempt was made to form a company and formalise the ownership of the paper. A deed of association for "The Proprietors of The Press" was drafted, and it lists the five members of the previous committee (John Watts-Russell, Rev. John Raven, H. P. Lance, Henry Tancred, and Harman), plus five new members: Alfred Richard Creyke, John Hall, Joseph Brittan, Isaac Cookson, and James Somerville Turnbull. Surprisingly, the deed was not executed, but four month later, FitzGerald, who had no funds, was the sole owner "through the liberality of the proprietors", as he called it later. In June 1862, Fitzgerald won a by-election and regained a seat in the House of Representatives. With less time for the day-to-day affairs of The Press, Fitzgerald engaged Harman and Stevens later in 1863 as commercial agents to run the newspaper's affairs. Stevens was mostly acting on behalf of the commercial agents. Over a protracted period of several years, Harman and Stevens manoeuvred Fitzgerald out of ownership by taking on his debts, charging large interest on loans, and taking more and more control. Harman and Stevens took over most of Fitzgerald's shareholding in 1871, and in June 1872, they bought the business premises in Cashel Street from him. Fitzgerald kept a mortgaged shareholding, but had lost control to Harman and Stevens. In its centennial history, the period of high debt and poor financial management under Fitzgerald is described "as a discolouration of the brightest character connected with The Press in its founding years." The writers of the history acknowledge Harman and Stevens as "among the shrewdest financial brains in Christchurch in their day". FitzGerald once called Stevens a "thorough Jew".

== Public service ==
=== Political activity ===
Harman was elected onto the council of the Society of Land Purchasers, the organisation that looked after the interests of the settlers and dealt with the representative of the Canterbury Association, John Robert Godley. Harman was clerk of the council.

Harman was member of the Canterbury Provincial Council for different constituencies. He was first elected for the Heathcote electorate in November 1857 in the election for the second council. He resigned in January 1858 and was re-elected in the following month, and served until January 1860. From February 1860 to January 1861, he represented the Akaroa electorate, and was again Akaroa's representative from September 1861 to March 1862.

Prior to his first election onto the council, he was appointed in June 1857 onto the Canterbury Executive Council led by Richard Packer. He was on successive executive councils under Charles Bowen, Thomas Cass, and resigned in January 1858 when the executive was led by Henry Tancred. He held the roles of Provincial Treasurer and Auditor while on the executive. He then led the Executive Council himself for a week in November 1859. Harman was the province's last Deputy-Superintendent and filled that role from September 1871 until the abolition of provincial government in 1876.

The second Canterbury Superintendent, William Sefton Moorhouse, shocked the province into economic development by putting a tunnel through the Port Hills and developing a railway system. In 1861, he planned a spur line from the Ōpāwaho / Heathcote River port at Ferrymead to the main line to Christchurch and arranged privately to purchase land from Captain William Charlesworth. Finding that he lacked the money, Moorhouse obtained permission from his executive to take funds from the provincial account. Harman, acting treasurer and outside the executive, resigned rather than approve this cavalier means of obtaining money.

Moorhouse's foes on the provincial council, led by Joseph Brittan, were strident in their criticism of the 'Branch Railway Job' and tried, unsuccessfully, to drive him from office.

=== Community engagement ===
Harman served on many public bodies, including the Christchurch Drainage Board and Domain Board, and was at one time chairman. Harman was a member of the Cathedral Chapter and Diocesan Synod. He was for thirty years a member of the governing body of Christ's College, and from 1876 to 1878 of the Canterbury College. As a volunteer in the early days, he was captain of No. 2 Company Christchurch Rifles, and was also for many years captain of the Honorary Reserve Corps.

Sometimes business and community engagement overlapped. For many years, Harman and Stevens were the agents for English businessman, Benjamin Lancaster, who, in 1850, had bought Rural Section 62, on Ferry Road, just outside the original boundary of the City of Christchurch. In 1880, Christchurch sportsmen sought land which they could enclose and where the public would pay to witness cricket, cycling and rugby. Lancaster agreed to sell, for two thousand eight hundred and forty one pounds, 10 acres three roods and 30 perches. The purchaser was the newly formed Canterbury Cricket and Athletics Sports Club. On the site, there was established the famed Lancaster Park. E. C. J. Stevens, a prominent member of the club, is commemorated in a thoroughfare in the area, Stevens Street.

Harman had a strong affinity to the Church of St Michael and All Angels, Christchurch's first Anglican church and the settlements pro-cathedral until the completion of ChristChurch Cathedral in 1881. Harman attended service every Sunday, was a churchwarden and a vestryman. When a new vestry was built in 1901, he had a bad fall on the construction site and broke his thigh bone, which made him bed bound for three months.

== Death ==
It is assumed that Harman never fully recovered from his accident at St Michael, and he died on 26 November 1902 at his residence in Windmill Road. His funeral service was held at St Michael, and he was buried at Barbadoes Street Cemetery.

== Notes ==
Political offices
Preceded by Edward Richardson	Chairman of the Lyttelton Harbour Board; 1882	Succeeded by Peter Cunningham
