= 15th Niue Assembly =

2014–2017 legislative term

The 15th Niue Assembly was a term of the Niue Assembly. Its composition was determined by the 2014 election, held on 12 April 2014.

The Speaker of the 15th Assembly was Togiavalu Pihigia.

== Members ==
The members of the 15th Legislative Assembly were:

Name	Electorate
Terry Donald Coe	Common Roll
Andrew Funaki	Tamakautoga
Stanley Atuvaha Kalauni	Common Roll
Jack Willie Lipitoa	Namukulu
Halene Kupa Magatogia	Lakepa
Bill Vakaafi Motufoou	Mutalau
Fisa Igilisi Pihigia	Tuapa
Tofua Puletama	Makefu
Togia Likalika Sioneholo	Common Roll
Pokotoa Sipeli	Liku
Dalton Tagelagi	Alofi South
Opili Talafasi	Hikutavake
Billy Graham Talagi	Avatele
Toke Talagi	Common Roll
Talaititama Talaiti	Vaiea
Crossley Tatui	Common Roll
Dion Paki Taufitu	Toi
Va'aiga Tukuitonga	Alofi North
Joan Sisiati Tahafa Viliamu	Common Roll
Mititaiagimene Young Vivian	Hakupu
