= 2014 Niuean general election =

- 12 April 2014

All 20 seats in the Assembly 11 seats needed for a majority

Parliamentary elections were held in Niue on 12 April 2014. Candidates supportive of the government of Premier Toke Talagi won 12 of the 20 seats.

== Background ==
Following the 2011 election, Toke Talagi was re-elected as premier for a second term. The Assembly was dissolved on 7 March 2014.

== Electoral system ==
Of the 20 Niue Assembly members, six were elected on a common roll and fourteen in single-member constituencies. There were no political parties in Niue at the time of the election, and all candidates were independents.

== Results ==
=== Common roll ===
Candidate	Votes	%	Notes
Stan Kalauni	450	9.44	Elected
Toke Talagi	439	9.21	Elected
Crossley Tatui	397	8.33	Elected
Togia Sioneholo	349	7.32	Elected
Terry Coe	340	7.13	Elected
Joan Viliamu	328	6.88	Elected
Asu Pulu	282	5.91	
Sisilia Talagi	278	5.83	
John Tiakia	273	5.73	
Tapu Pihigia	270	5.66	
Willie Saniteli	260	5.45	
Fapoi Akesi	235	4.93	
Richie Mautama	233	4.89	
Maru Talagi	191	4.01	
Gustava Pavihi	186	3.90	
Shield Palahetogia	137	2.87	
Charlie Tongahai	120	2.52	
Total	4,768	100.00	
Valid votes	814	96.67	
Invalid/blank votes	28	3.33	
Total votes	842	100.00	
Source: Niue TV

=== Constituency results ===
Constituency	Candidate	Votes	%	Notes
Alofi North	Va'aiga Tukuitonga	–	–	Elected unopposed
Alofi South	Dalton Tagelagi	81	39.13	Elected
Alofi South	Manasofai Talagi	47	22.71	
Alofi South	Rosaalofa Rex	41	19.81	
Alofi South	Laga Lavini	38	18.36	
Alofi South	Invalid/blank votes	2	–	
Alofi South	Total	209	100	
Avatele	Billy Talagi	–	–	Elected unopposed
Hakupu	Young Vivian	49	51.58	Elected
Hakupu	Michael Jackson	46	48.42	
Hakupu	Invalid/blank votes	2	–	
Hakupu	Total	95	100	
Hikutavake	Opili Talafasi	15	57.69	Elected
Hikutavake	James Salekiki	11	42.31	
Hikutavake	Invalid/blank votes	1	–	
Hikutavake	Total	27	100	
Lakepa	Halene Kupa Magatogia	–	–	Elected unopposed
Liku	Pokotoa Sipeli	–	–	Elected unopposed
Makefu	Tofua Puletama	23	58.97	Elected
Makefu	Tulelehemaama Tongia	16	41.03	
Makefu	Invalid/blank votes	0	–	
Makefu	Total	39	100	
Mutalau	Bill Vakaafi Motufoou	33	66.00	Elected
Mutalau	Hare Paka	17	43.00	
Mutalau	Invalid/blank votes	0	–	
Mutalau	Total	50	100	
Namukulu	Jack Lipitoa	–	–	Elected unopposed
Tamakautoga	Andrew Funaki	36	56.25	Elected
Tamakautoga	Muiakituki Makani	28	43.75	
Tamakautoga	Invalid/blank votes	4	–	
Tamakautoga	Total	68	100	
Toi	Dion Taufitu	10	50.00	Elected (by lots)
Toi	Mokaelalini Vaha	10	50.00	
Toi	Invalid/blank votes	0	–	
Toi	Total	20	100	
Tuapa	Fisa Igilisi Pihigia	30	56.60	Elected
Tuapa	Mona Ainuu	23	43.40	
Tuapa	Invalid/blank votes	3	–	
Tuapa	Total	56	100	
Vaiea	Talititama Taliati	–	–	Elected unopposed
Source: Niue TV
