= 2011 Niuean general election =

- 7 May 2011

All 20 seats in the Assembly 11 seats needed for a majority

General elections were held in Niue on 7 May 2011, to elect the members of the Niue Assembly. In the leadup to the election Speaker of the Niue Assembly Atapana Siakimotu announced that he would be retiring from politics.

== Electoral system ==
Of the 20 Niue Assembly members, six were elected on a common roll and fourteen in single-member constituencies. There were no political parties in Niue at the time of the election, and all candidates were independents.

The election was managed and controlled by the Chief Electoral Officer, Justin Kamupala, who was also the Secretary of the Niue Department of Justice, Lands and Survey.

== Results ==
There were four changes in membership: Three new members were elected on the common roll, with caretaker PM Toke Talagi topping the vote. The only change in village seats was that Tofua Puletama was ousted from Makefu by Salilo Tongia in a close result.

=== Common roll ===
Candidate	Votes	%
Toke Talagi	467	10.49
Terry Coe	429	9.64
Joan Viliamu	366	8.22
Stan Kalauni	360	8.09
Togia Sioneholo	326	7.32
Crossley Tatui	324	7.28
Opoleta Tiaka	297	6.67
Asu Pulu	289	6.49
Maru Tafagi	270	6.06
Esther Pavihi	250	5.62
Maihetoe Hekau	242	5.44
Lofa Rex	210	4.72
Willie Papani	195	4.38
Grace Talagi	169	3.80
Laga Lavini	159	3.57
David Poihega	67	1.50
Vilikaua Vilikai	32	0.72
Total	4,452	100.00
Valid votes	4,452	99.26
Invalid/blank votes	33	0.74
Total votes	4,485	100.00
Source: Niue TV

=== Constituency results ===
Constituency	Candidate	Votes	%	Notes
Alofi North	Va'aiga Tukuitonga	62	77.50	Elected
Alofi North	Roz Hipa	18	22.50	
Alofi South	Dalton Tagelagi	116	60.42	Elected
Alofi South	Charlie Togahai	76	39.58	
Avatele	Billy Talagi	—	—	Elected unopposed
Hakupu	Young Vivian	33	53.23	Elected
Hakupu	Michael Jackson	29	46.77	
Hikutavake	Opili Talafasi	13	54.17	Elected
Hikutavake	Pamela Togiakona	11	45.83	
Lakepa	Halene Magatogia	—	—	Elected unopposed
Liku	Pokotoa Sipeli	—	—	Elected unopposed
Makefu	Salilo Tongia	16	43.24	Elected
Makefu	Tofua Puletama	15	40.54	
Makefu	Charlie Tohovaka	6	16.22	
Mutalau	Bill Vakaafi Motufoou	34	72.34	Elected
Mutalau	Makaseau Ioane	13	27.66	
Namukulu	Jack Willie Lipitoa	—	—	Elected unopposed
Tamakautoga	Andrew Funaki	—	—	Elected unopposed
Toi	Dion Taufitu	11	61.11	Elected
Toi	Hamouli Kaulima	4	22.22	
Toi	Lilivaka Muimatagi	3	16.67	
Tuapa	Fisa Igilisi Pihigia	—	—	Elected unopposed
Vaiea	Talaititama Talaiti	—	—	Elected unopposed
Source: Niue News 1

== Aftermath ==
As expected, Talagi was re-elected as PM with 12 of 20 votes.

== See also ==
- 2012 Toi by-election
