= Coconut production in Niue =

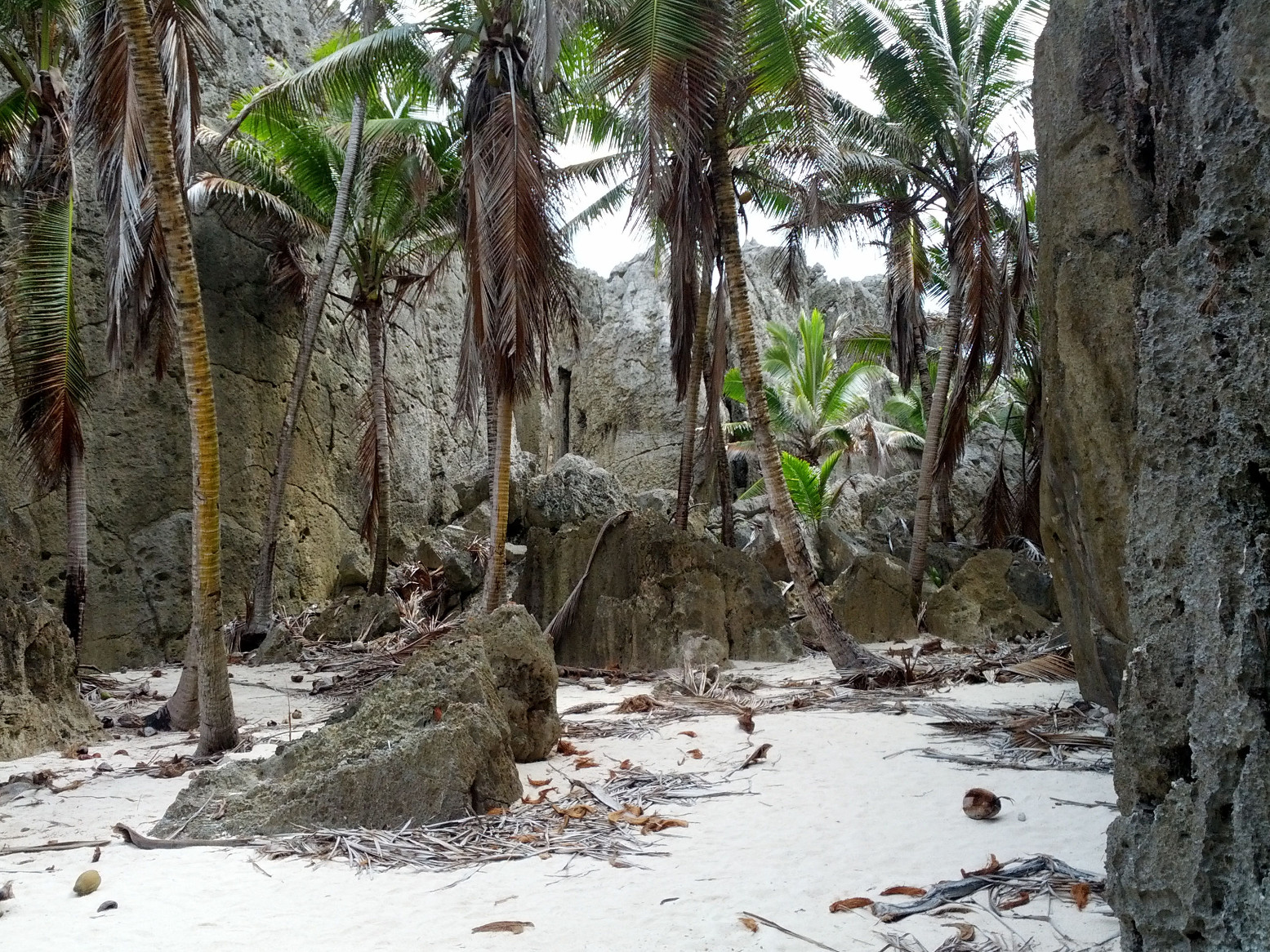
Niue landscape with coconut trees

In 2013, the island country Niue produced 3,200 tonnes of coconuts valued at INT$385,830. Coconut is a cash crop on the island, which is converted to derivatives such as copra and coconut cream in tinned form, and also exported. Originally, the island had a profusion of coconut trees reflected in the country's name, Niue, in the local language. The Niue Development Board is responsible for planning and execution of schemes of agricultural produce, including coconut and related products.

== History ==
The name of the island "Niue" is the local name for coconut. The coconut is not indigenous to the island or any of the Pacific Islands. It has been stated that it could be from Central America. It has been growing on the island since historical times. One view, by a local man, is that the plant drifted ashore and was picked up and planted at Mutalau. It could have drifted due to trade winds. Another view is that voyagers carried them in their canoes and planted them in the islands, which they visited during journey. According to local legend two men, Levei-matagi and Levei-fualoto, who travelled from Tutuila carrying gifts of coconuts given to them by the local chief, came to the island and called it the island Niue-fekai, after the name of the coconut niue.

Its growth is more prominent in the island's lower terrace rather than the interior, and in villages on the eastern side; Mutalau to Lakepa on the northern part of the island account for its largest plantations. In the 1880s, coconut plantations had been created by clearing half the area of the island. A coconut cream factory closed in 1991, subsequent to hurricane damage. As of 2013, the Food and Agriculture Organization reports 3,200 tonnes of coconut production, valued at INT$385,830, from an area of 3,300 hectares (8,200 acres) with an average yield of 9,697 hectograms per ha (969.7 tons/ha).

== Local uses ==
A coconut with little pulp is called kola and pona-niu. The stem on which the nut grows is called the loholoho, the flowering stage is called tome, the young shoot is named uruka, midrib of the leaf is called palelafe, the rib of each separate branch is known as kaniu. As the fruits start maturing the sponge that develops inside is called who-niu. The branches of the tree are used for making brooms, combs, etc. The dried leaf itself is used to make thatch for roofs, baskets (kato), and mats (potu). The wood of the tree is tough and heavy, and is used to make polished walking sticks. The white pulp of the nut is extracted and pressed to make coconut oil called puke-lolo, a sometimes scented oil which is used for massaging the body before taking a bath.

The fibrous part of the coconut, called pulu, is used for making rope or sinnet (tona) and strings (aho). Sinnet is considered to be very strong and durable. Coconut shells, after cleaning and polishing are used for making vessels such as a water bottle. Dried coconut or copra is exported from the island. The names used in the island while presenting the coconut at one of the festivals is Fua-alu (Ulu-Ola).

The coconut tree is climbed by young boys of age 8 and above, and the fruit is felled. The coconut is then sheared at the top end with a pointed rod of wood fixed on the ground. After the surface skin is removed and an opening is made to drink the coconut water contained in it. The flesh inside the coconut is then scooped out and used in cooking various dishes. The stem of the tree is affixed with a leaf, termed fona, indicating that the tree is preserved for a long time. A guest to the island is presented with a fresh coconut on arrival indicating that he is welcome to enjoy his stay in Niue.

== Bibliography ==
- Cushman, Gregory T. (25 March 2013). Guano and the Opening of the Pacific World: A Global Ecological History. Cambridge University Press. ISBN 978-1-107-31072-8.
- Ridgell, Reilly (1995). Pacific Nations and Territories: The Islands of Micronesia, Melanesia, and Polynesia. Bess Press. ISBN 978-1-57306-001-1.
- Smith, S (1993). Niue The Island And Its People. editorips@usp.ac.fj. pp. 97–. GGKEY:1ZG5T864FZB.
- Sykes, William Russell (1970). Contributions to the Flora of Niue. Government Print. ISBN 9780477018883.Coconut plantation in Niue had suffered serious damage in the hurricane of 1989, which had then resulted in closure of the coconut cream factory.
