= Nukai Peniamina =

Niuean missionary

- Born: Unknown; Niue
- Died: 6 March 1874; Samoa?
- Resting place: Makefu, Niue
- Known for: Bringing Christianity to Niue

Nukai Peniamina was a Niuean who brought Christianity to the island of Niue in 1846.

== Conversion ==
In 1830, the London Missionary Society abducted two local boys (Uea and Niumaga) away from the island and attempted to convert them. When they returned, they were no longer accepted and Uea was killed. Niumaga soon decided to leave for Samoa with his friend; Nukai Peniamina. There, Peniamina began to work as servant for Dr. George Turner, a Welsh missionary. Nukai learned to read and write and was converted to Christianity, subsequently being trained as a pastor in Malua Theological College in Samoa.

== Return ==
In 1846, Peniamina returned to Niue on board the John Williams, accompanied by Fakafitifonua (a Niuean with influence on the island). On 26 October, and on their fifth landing attempt, the chiefs of Mutalau accepted them. Peniamina was taken to the 'Taue i Fupiu' where he is said to have been constantly protected by 61 warriors, due to were many plots to kill him and Fakafitifonua. Christianity was first taught to the Mutalau people before it spread to the other villages on the island, the last of them being Vaiea.

== Later life ==
Peniamina remained at the station at Mutalau until October 1849, when it was taken over by a Samoan. In 1850, it was found that Peniamina had had an extra-marital relationship with another woman. Although acceptable in Niuean society at the time, it was not permitted by his missionary superiors. Peniamina was banished and sent out to sea on a canoe. He settled in Samoa and died on 6 March 1874. He is buried in the Niuean village of Makefu.

== Legacy ==
Every fourth Friday in October, Niueans celebrate 'Gospel Day' to remember Peniamina. Additionally, the Mutalau Show Day is held on the final Saturday of October, to celebrate his landing there in 1846.
