= Village Park =

Village Park may refer to:

- Village Park, Florida
- Village Park, Hawaii
- Village Park (stadium), a football stadium in Alofi, Niue
