= 2021 Niuean village council elections =

- 27 August 2021

Village council elections were held in Niue on 27 August 2021 to elect members of the village councils of all fourteen villages. However, in only six villages were there more candidates than seats to fill, so all other candidates were elected unopposed.

== Electoral system ==
Niue uses a multiple non-transferable vote system to elect members to the Village Council. Voters will select five candidates, and whichever five candidates receives the most votes, will be elected.

== Background ==
The election date was announced on 3 August, with candidate nominations being accepted until 11 August. The village of Vaiea did not nominate any candidates, it was announced that a by-election would be scheduled following the conclusion of the elections.

== Results ==
=== Alofi Tokelau (North) ===
Candidate	Votes	%	Notes
Emani Fakaotimanava-Lui	55	85.94%	Elected
Mokalita Heka			Elected
Rupina Morrissey			Elected
Margaret Siosikefu			Elected
EJ Embey Jnr Strickland			Elected
Mokalita Heka			
Alan Tano Puleoti			
Total	64	100.00%	—N/a

=== Alofi Toga (South) ===
Candidate	Notes
Robin Hekau	Elected unopposed
Anthea Hekau-Harding	Elected unopposed
O’love Hekesi	Elected unopposed
Dimitry Viliamu	Elected unopposed

=== Avatele ===
Candidate	Notes
Hetututama Hetutu	Elected unopposed
Taihia Hetutu	Elected unopposed
Emeline Laufoli	Elected unopposed
Jody Laufoli	Elected unopposed
Tifaga Tupuiliu	Elected unopposed

=== Hakupu ===
Candidate	Notes
Nise Marie Jackson	Elected unopposed
Pacific Enterprise Mautama	Elected unopposed
Patlin Siligi	Elected unopposed
Dempster Tomailuga	Elected unopposed
Itzy Tukuitoga	Elected unopposed

=== Hikutavake ===
Candidate	Votes	%	Notes
Felicity Iulioonta Pulehetoa	14	82.35%	Elected
Masiniholo Lagaloga			Elected
Olevai Pipitolu			Elected
Alisha Talafasi			Elected
Antony Guz Tohovaka			Elected
Total	17	100.00%	—N/a

=== Lakepa ===
Candidate	Notes
Tongariro Konelio	Elected unopposed
Rhonda Tiakia	Elected unopposed
Trevor Tiakia	Elected unopposed
Ezra Togiamana	Elected unopposed

=== Liku ===
Candidate	Votes	%	Notes
Sifa McMillan Pulehetoa	27	64.29%	Elected
Simi Tominiko	27	64.29%	Elected
Christian Poumale			Elected
Newland Tulitoatama Poumale			Elected
Sionetasi Pulehetoa			Elected
Total	42	100.00%	—N/a

=== Makefu ===
Candidate	Votes	%	Notes
Ernie Judy Tohovaka	25	75.76%	Elected
Tioneatali Kemusiaki Lolani			Elected
Etaena Poihega			Elected
Marcus Puletama			Elected
Charles Tohovaka			Elected
Total	33	100.00%	—N/a

=== Mutalau ===
Candidate	Notes
Florence Melekitama	Elected unopposed
Jean Pulefolau	Elected unopposed
Judy Taoafe	Elected unopposed
Meleki Tauefasi	Elected unopposed

=== Namukulu ===
Candidate	Notes
Kilimana Hiligutu	Elected unopposed
Talaia Makaia	Elected unopposed
Fenogalaia Sionetuato	Elected unopposed

=== Toi ===
Candidate	Notes
Vikatolia Liumaihetau	Elected unopposed
Manogi Poihega	Elected unopposed
Ponivasalia Taufitu	Elected unopposed
Paulino Tokimua	Elected unopposed
Sapati Tuhega	Elected unopposed
