= Liku, Niue =

Liku
- Village
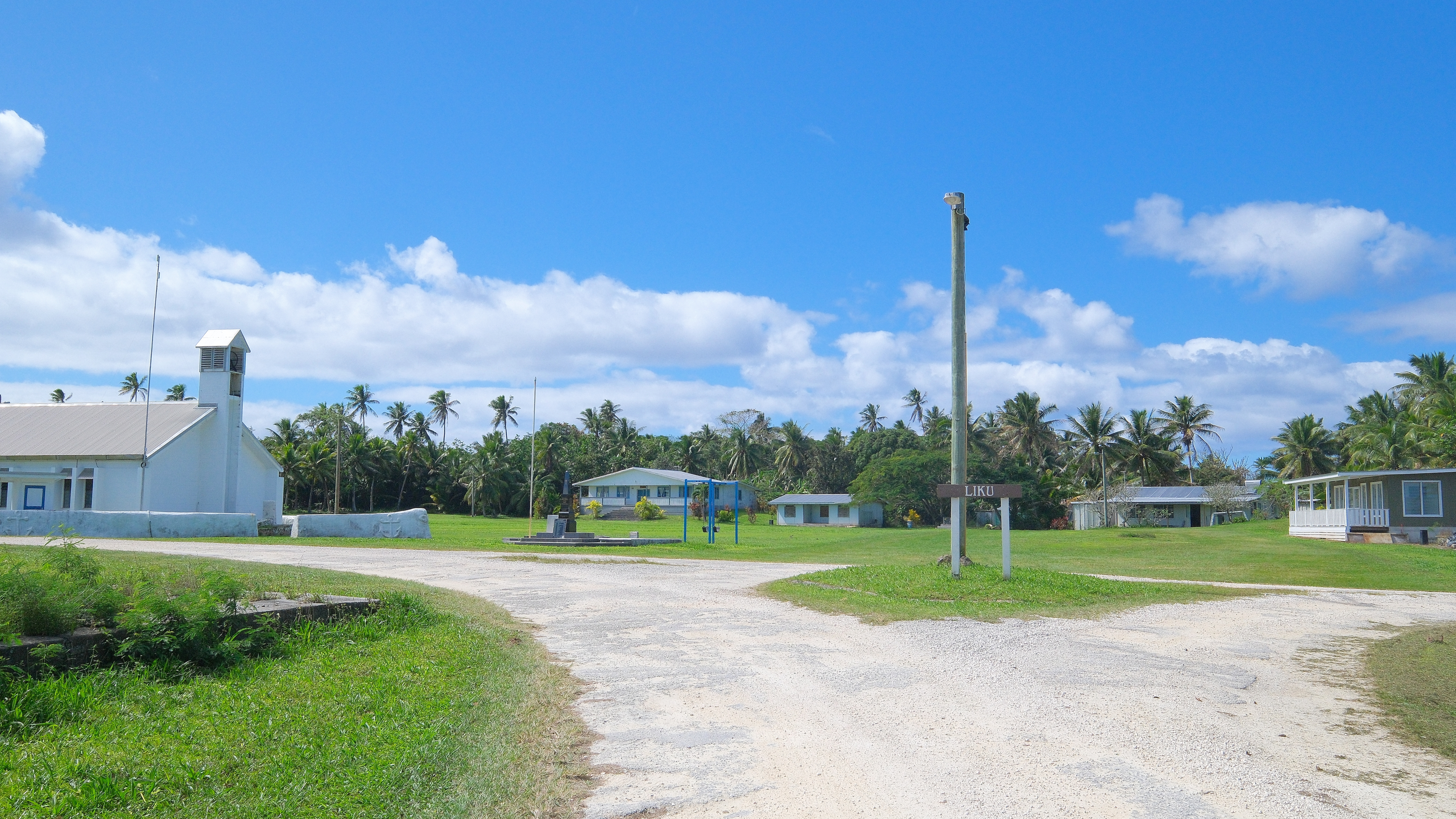

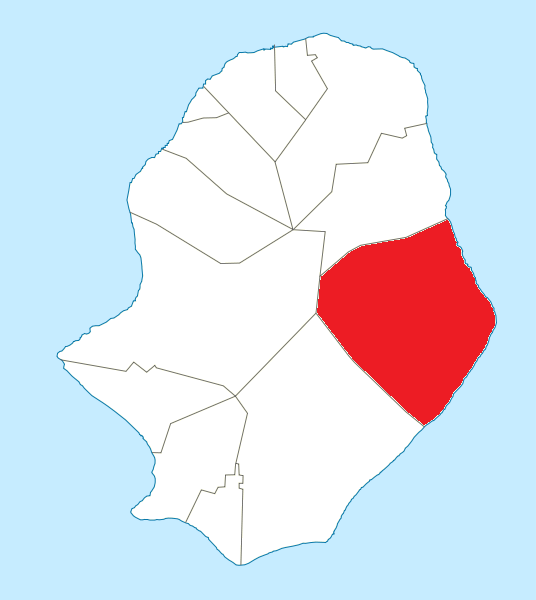
- Liku council within Niue

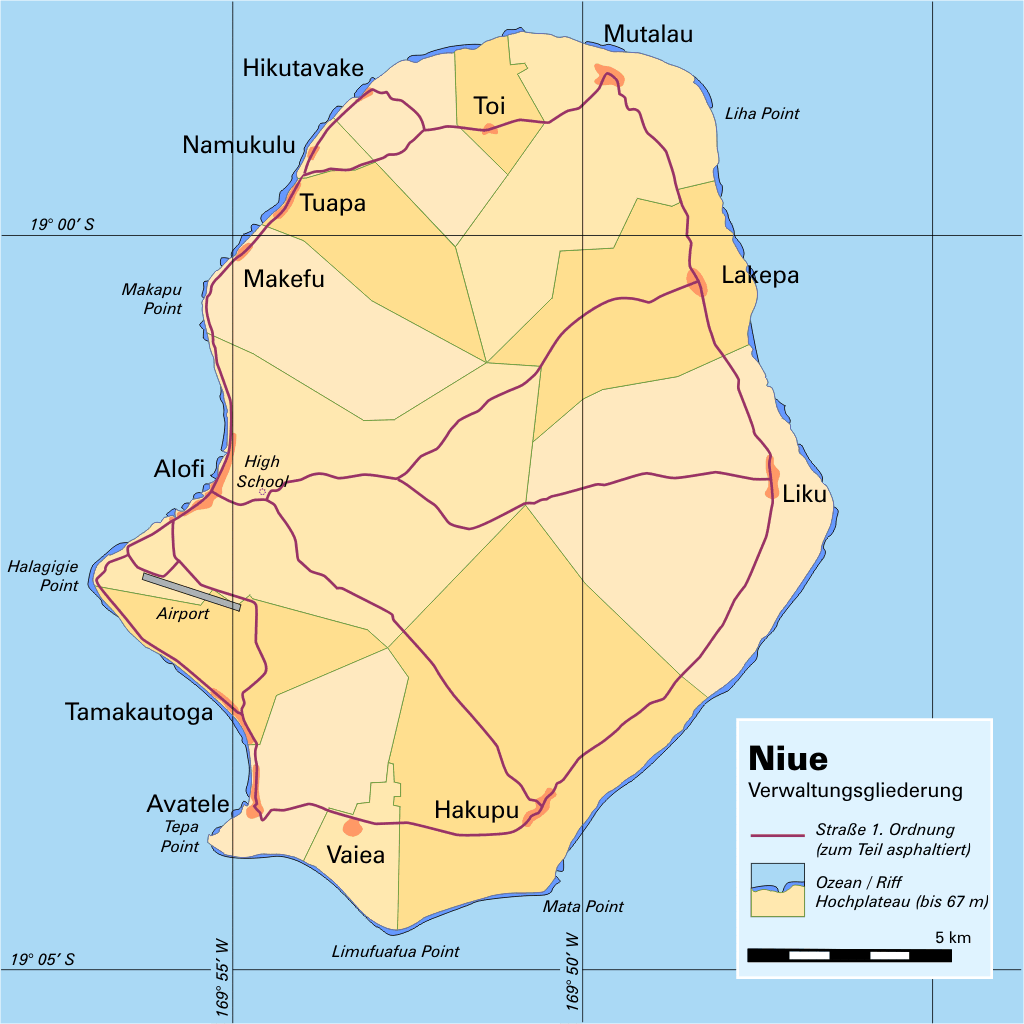
- Administrative map of Niue showing all the villages
- Coordinates: 19°02′S 169°47′W
- Country: Niue
- Tribal Area: Motu

Area
  - Total: 41.64 km^{2} (16.08 sq mi)

Population (2022)
  - Total: 74
  - Density: 1.77/km^{2} (4.6/sq mi)
- Time zone: UTC-11 (UTC-11)
- Area code: +683

Liku is one of the fourteen villages of Niue, located close to the easternmost part of the island. It lies due east of the capital, Alofi, and its population at the 2022 census was 74.

== Geography ==
Liku is connected to the capital by a road which traverses the centre of the island. It is also - along with Lakepa, six kilometres to the north and Hakupu, 10 kilometres to the south - one of three villages on the east coast road which connects Vaiea in the south with Mutalau on the north coast. The Liku council also contains Ana, a community northwest of the village centre.

== Administration ==
Liku is one of the fourteen constituencies in Niue, electing one representative to the Niue Assembly. Following the 2008 general election, its representative is Pokotoa Sipeli, who serves as Minister of Post and Telecommunications, Minister of Agriculture, Forestry and Fisheries, and Minister of Administrative Services.

== Notable residents ==
- Nahega Molifai Silimaka
- John Pule
