= Mutalau =

- Village
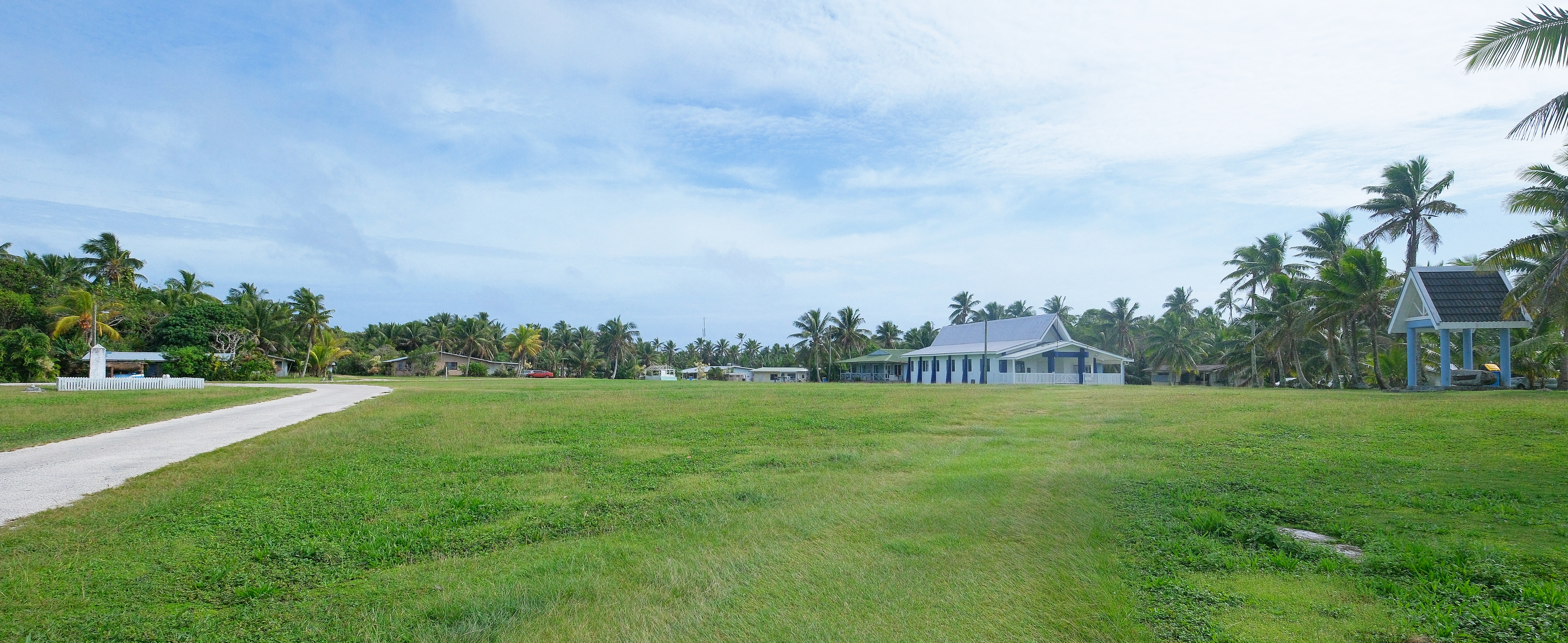

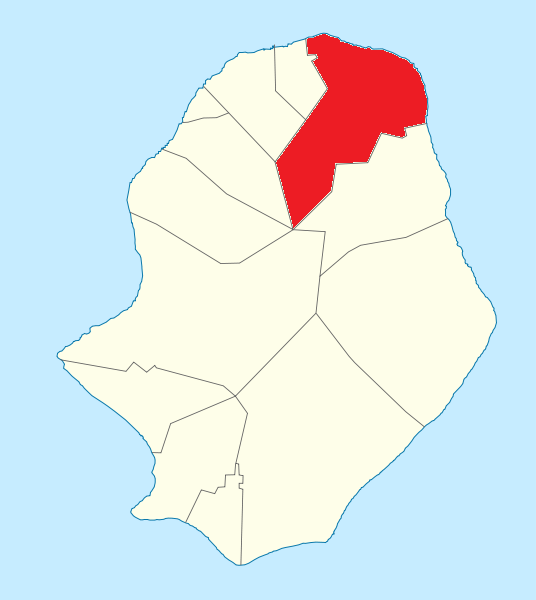
- Mutalau council within Niue

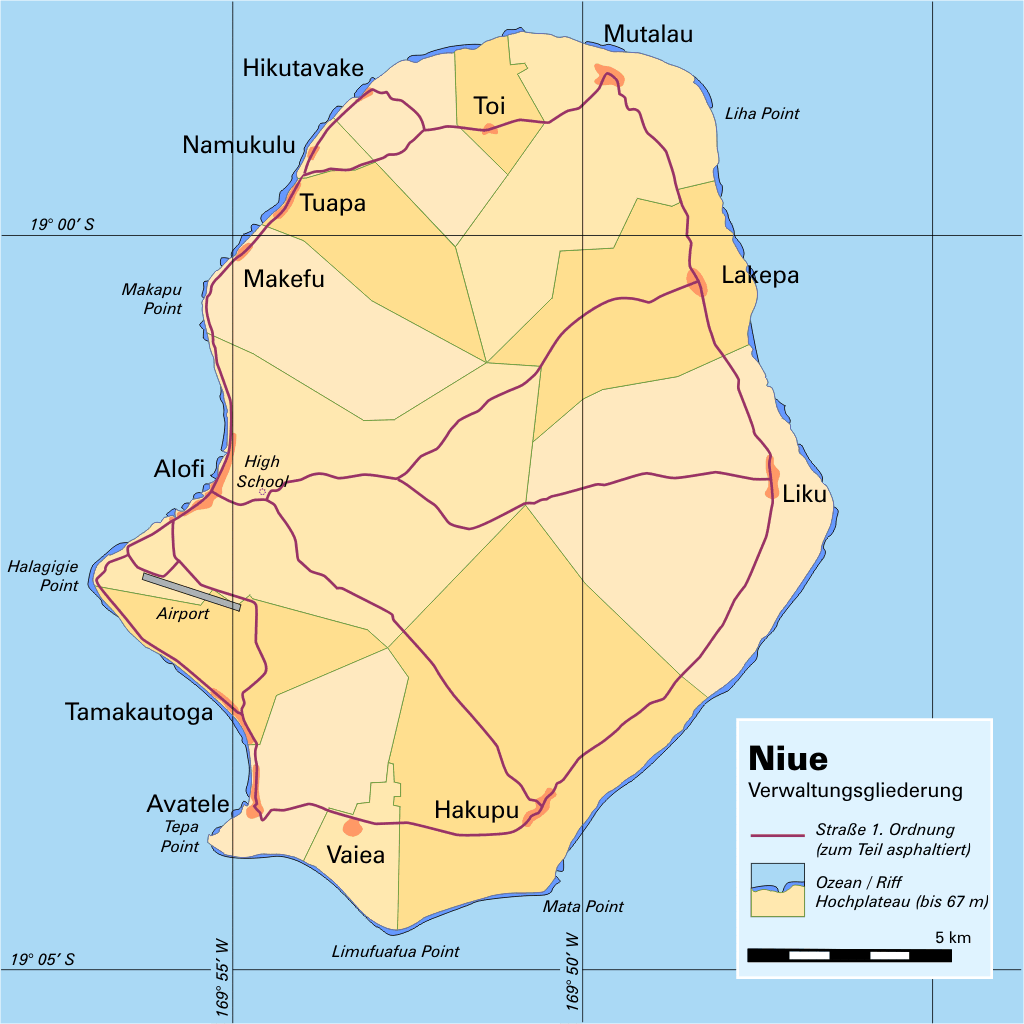
- Administrative map of Niue showing all the villages
- Coordinates: 18°56′S 169°50′W
- Country: Niue
- Tribal Area: Motu

Area
  - Total: 26.31 km^{2} (10.16 sq mi)

Population (2022)
  - Total: 77
  - Density: 2.93/km^{2} (7.6/sq mi)
- Time zone: UTC-11 (UTC-11)
- Area code: +683

Mutalau is one of the fourteen villages of Niue, and includes the northernmost point of the island. Its population at the 2022 census was 77, down from 98 in 2017.

== History ==
=== Overview ===
It was previously known as Ululauta and Matahefonua. Ululauta and Matahefonua both mean "head of the land". The name "Mutalau Ululauta Matahefonua" is adopted by the Mutalau people in Auckland, New Zealand as the name for their trust called the Mutalau Ululauta Matahefonua Trust (MUMT). Mutalau has a community hall called Salim Hall, named after the head of the UN Decolonisation Committee that came to Niue in the early 1970s to meet with Niueans and discuss the road map toward self-government.

In 1864 Mutalau was listed as one of the five principal villages of Niue, and hosting a missionary station and Samoan teacher. In 1863 or 1864 the village was raided by a Peruvian slave-ship, and many men were kidnapped and taken to Callao.

In 1915 a tropical cyclone blew the roof off the church. Another cyclone in 1941 destroyed the government and mission schools, as well as twenty houses.

=== Timeline ===
- 1846 - Nukai Peniamina landed at Uluvehi with the help of Toimata Fakafitienua.

== Geography ==
Mutalau is the northernmost village on Niue. Its territory borders with Alofi, Hikutavake, Lakepa, Makefu, Toi and Tuapa.

== Economy ==
=== Agriculture ===
The village has 12,331 vanilla vines in July 2008 which is about 33 percent of Niue's total.

=== Tourism ===
The Mutalau Village Fiafia Night was designed and ready for service on 25 July 2009, a special evening/night of tours, culture and cuisine for tourists.

== Culture ==
Mutalau have two major events held each year, one is the Mutalau Marine Day held every Queen's Birthday where fishing competition and selling food held at the Uluvehi park. The Mutalau Show Day is held in the final Saturday of October to commemorate and celebrate and landing of the gospel in Niue, which happen in Uluvehi on 26 October 1846 brought in Peniamina with the help of Toimata Fakafitifonua.

== Administration ==
=== Mutalau Land Committee ===
- Chairperson: Frank Sioneholo
- Deputy Chair: Maka Ioane
- Members: Bill Vakaafi Motufoou MP, Sifa Ioane, Toni Kalauni Snr, Sam Tutogia Makatogia, vacant
- Secretary: vacant

The Mutalau Village Council (MVC) is very active in promoting and implementing community development projects. In 1996 a workshop was hosted by the Mutalau Village Council focusing on Designing and Developing Community Projects, consultants for the workshop was funded by NZAID. The outcome of this workshop where various projects was formulated, the projects includes:

- Kofekofe Sports Ground;
- Eco-tourism;
- Uluvehi Sea Track;

At the moment MVC is implementing two projects with funding support from the European Union. The Eco-tourism project focuses developing a recreation building, walking tracks and access to caves and reefs around the Uluvehi coastal areas. The Mutalau Coconut Oil focuses on producing coconut oil for skincare and later on for bio-fuel.

== Personalities ==
Mutalau has produced some prominent Niueans, who have also become prominent New Zealand citizens. Pauly Fuemana, the man behind the How bizarre song, the first hit from New Zealand to top the music charts in many countries. His father full blooded Niuean is from Mutalau. Che Fu is also another New Zealand popular artist of Niuean descent, his father Tigilau Ness is full blooded Niuean from Mutalau.

== International relations ==
Mutalau has an online virtual group, "Cyber Muta", used for sharing and exchanging information (news, views, reports, images, family notices) to Mutalau people living in different places in the World, Niue, New Zealand, Australia, USA and so forth. There is a Mutalau group in Auckland called Mutalau Ululauta Matahefonua Trust MUMT and Sons and Daughters of Mutalau in Australia SADOMIA based in Sydney, and another group in Brisbane. These groups are actively involved in raising funds, contributing items and offering sponsorships, especially for the Cyclone Heta recovery, Marine Days and Show Days.

The countries and international agencies that have assisted Mutalau with development projects are listed below. The people of Mutalau acknowledges their kind assistance and further seek their assistance for more development projects and contribute towards our social and economic development:

- European Union - Coconut Oil Project, Uluvehi Recreation Facility
- Australia - Bathroom Facilities at Salim Hall
- New Zealand - Re-construction of road and ramp to the sea at Uluvehi, Plaque for Uluvehi Park, Vanilla Project (national project)
- UNCCD - Sustainable Land Management Project, Mutalau Farm
