= Namukulu =

- Village
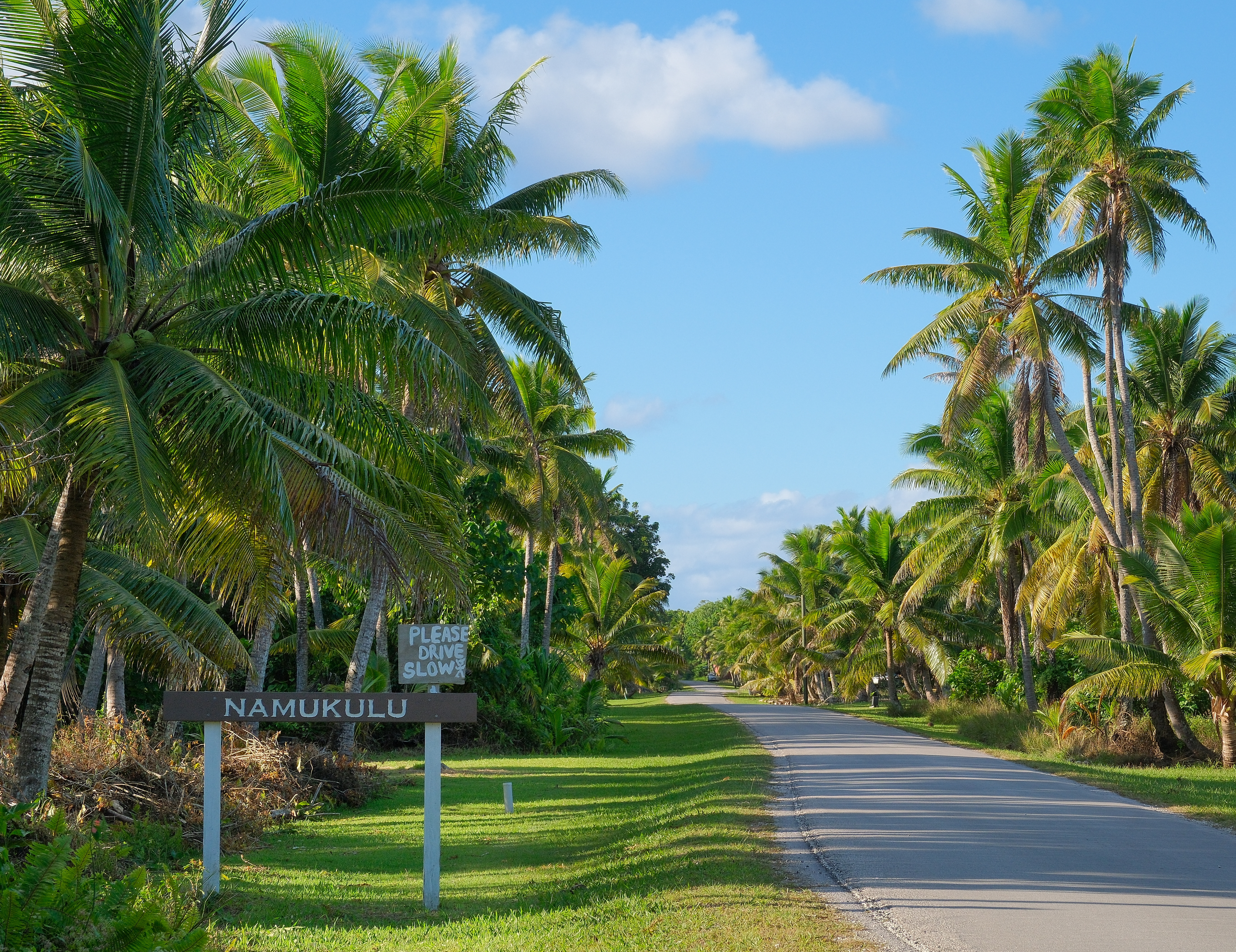

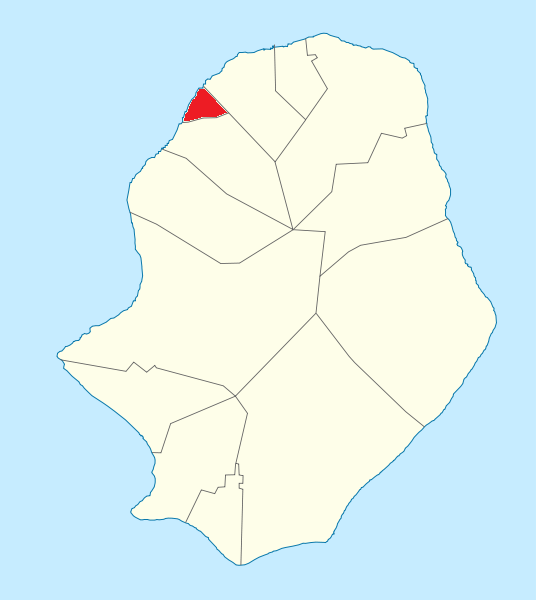
- Namukulu council within Niue

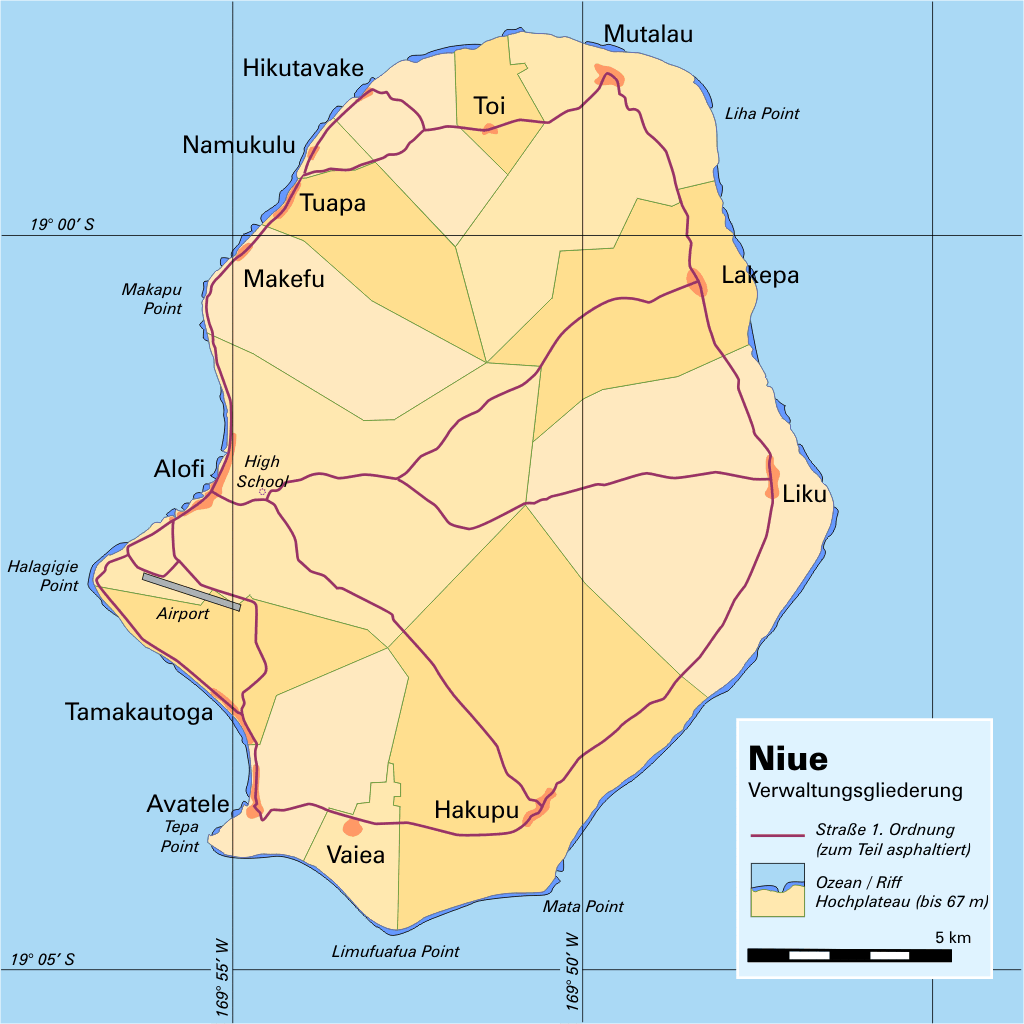
- Administrative map of Niue showing all the villages
- Coordinates: 18°57′S 169°54′W
- Country: Niue
- Tribal Area: Motu

Area
  - Total: 1.48 km^{2} (0.57 sq mi)

Population (2022)
  - Total: 9
  - Density: 6.08/km^{2} (15.7/sq mi)
- Time zone: UTC-11 (UTC-11)
- Area code: +683

Namukulu is one of the fourteen villages of Niue. With a population of 9 at the 2022 census, it is the smallest village on the island. It has an observation point located close to the Namukulu Cottages.

The village was established in 1922 by villagers from Tuapa. It celebrated its centenary in 2022.

== Geography ==
The village is located about 5 kilometres from Alofi, and lies between the villages of Tuapa and Hikutavake. There is a single resort, Namukulu Cottages & Spa.
