= Hakupu =

- Village
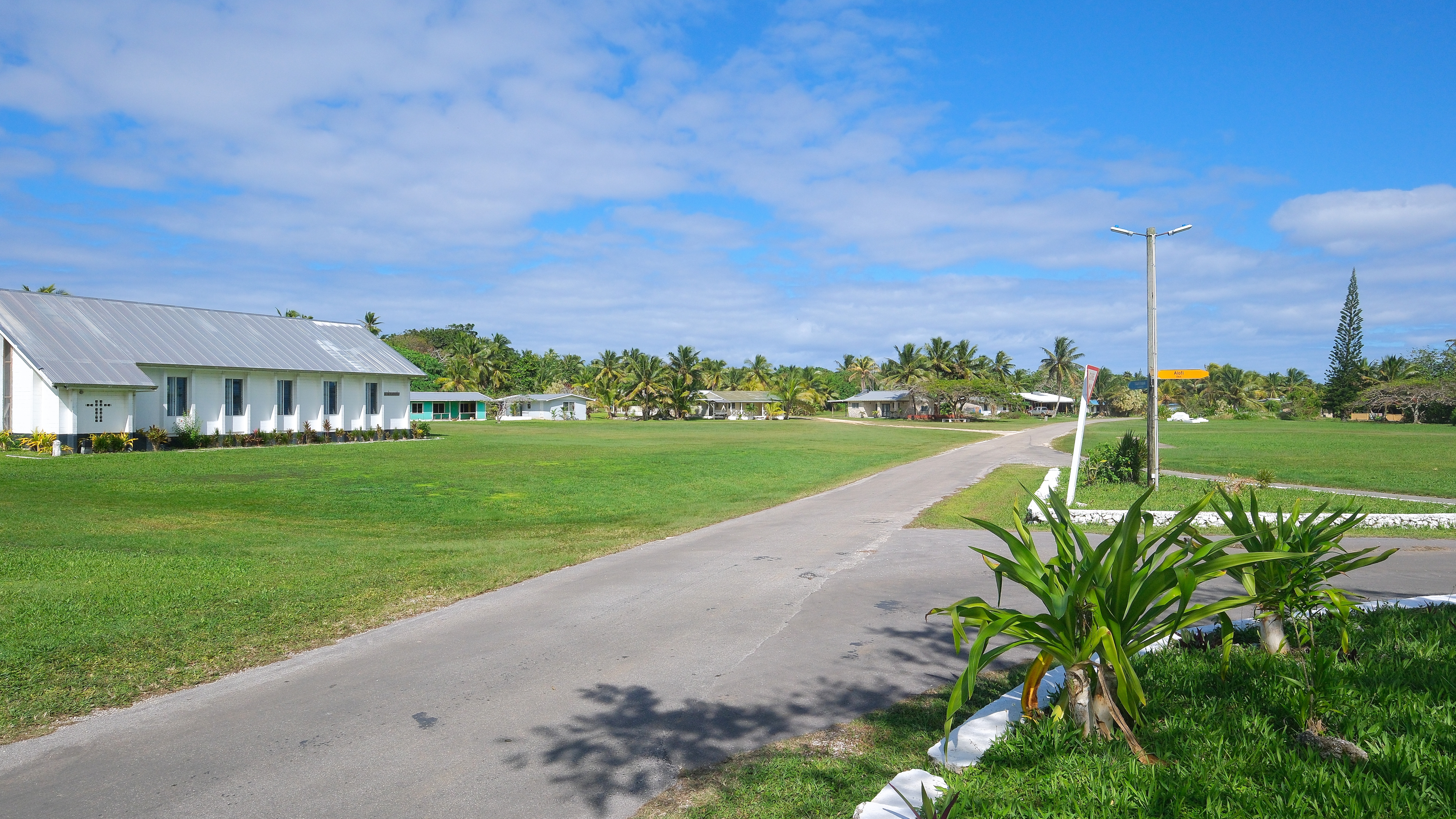

- Flag

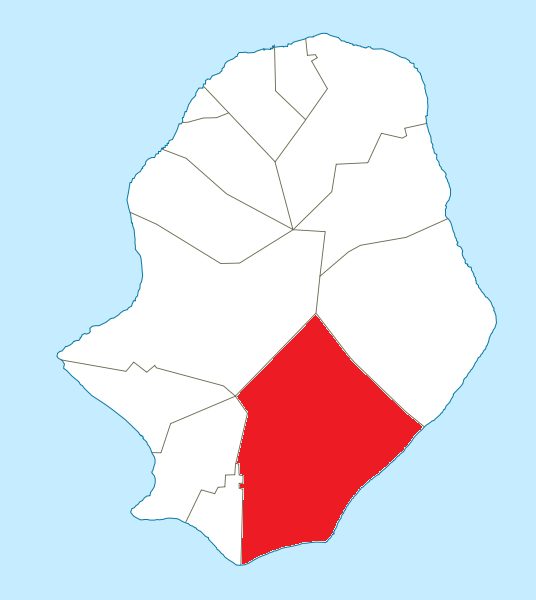
- Hakupu council within Niue

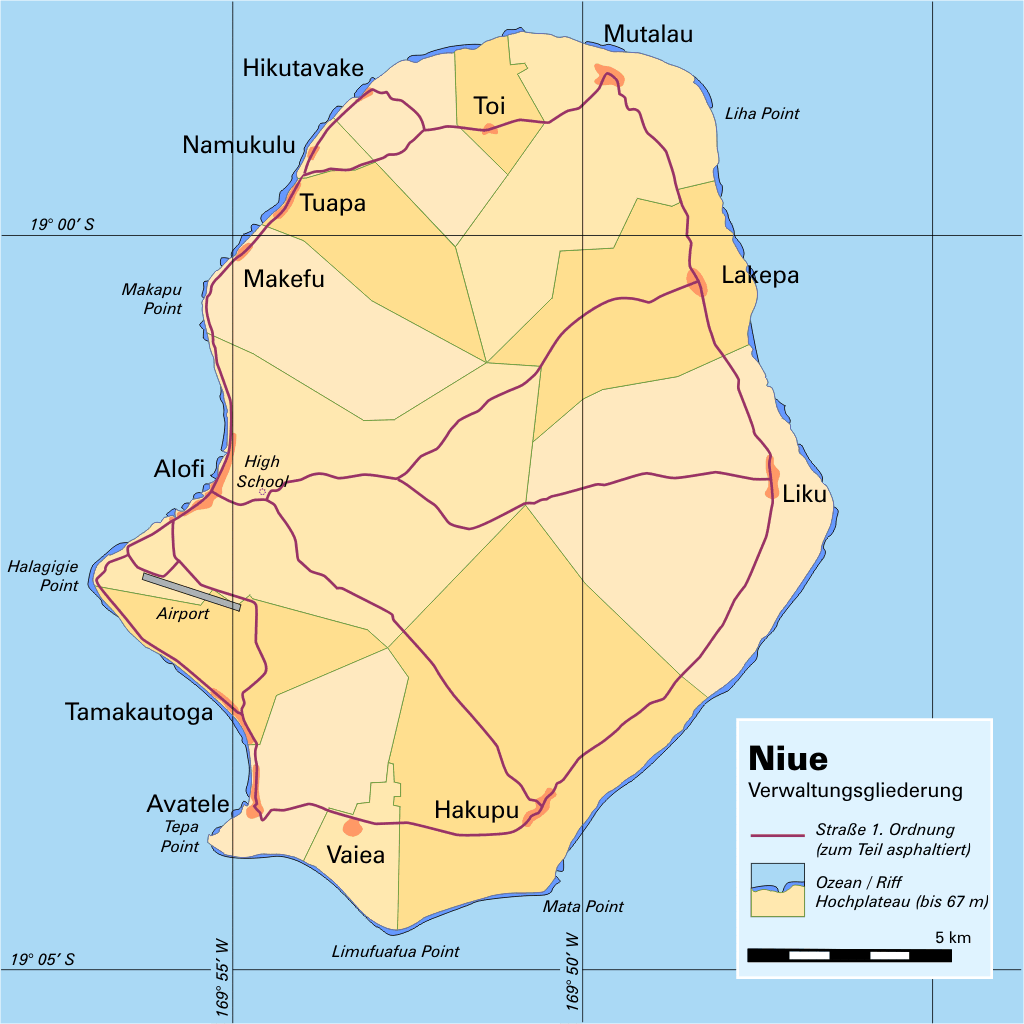
- Administrative map of Niue showing all the villages
- Coordinates: 19°06′S 169°50′W
- Country: Niue
- Tribal Area: Tafiti

Area
  - Total: 48.04 km^{2} (18.55 sq mi)

Population (2022)
  - Total: 180
  - Density: 3.75/km^{2} (9.7/sq mi)
- Time zone: UTC-11 (UTC-11)
- Area code: +683

Hakupu is one of the fourteen villages of the island of Niue. According to the 2022 census, it has a population of 180, making it the second-largest village in Niue, behind the capital Alofi.

== Geography ==
It is located in the southeast of the island, close to Matatamane Point, and is connected by road with the capital Alofi (12 kilometres to the northwest), Avatele (7 kilometres to the west), and via the east coast road to Liku (12 kilometres), Lakepa (16 kilometres), and Mutalau (on the north coast, 20 kilometres away).

== Popular sites ==
=== Huvalu Forest Conservation Area ===
The Huvalu Forest Conservation Area is a protected nature reserve covering an area of 57.7 km², approximately one fifth of the island, located just 4 km north of Hakupu.

=== Hakupu Heritage and Cultural Park Area ===
There is a Heritage Park Area close to the village which was established in 1998. It extends south from the Tuhiā Access Track, covering an area of 0.05 km². Its primary objective is to protect areas of historical and ecological significance.

=== Hakupu War Memorial ===
Hakupu has a memorial for soldiers who fought during the First World War, World War two, and the Malayan Emergency.

=== Anapala Chasm ===
Anapala is a freshwater pool located in a chasm near the track connecting the village of Hakupu to the coast. Accessible via a flight of 155 steps, the site historically served as a primary freshwater source for local residents

== Internet access ==
For a length of time, Hakupu had attempted, with difficulty, to achieve internet access. As of July 2005, Hakupu was seven miles away from the nearest wireless access point. Technicians had attempted to use an abandoned building in the village in order to create an access point. By 2010, the village was connected to internet services.

== Sports ==
Hakupu School Ground or Village Park is a sports ground.
