= Toi, Niue =

Toi
- Village
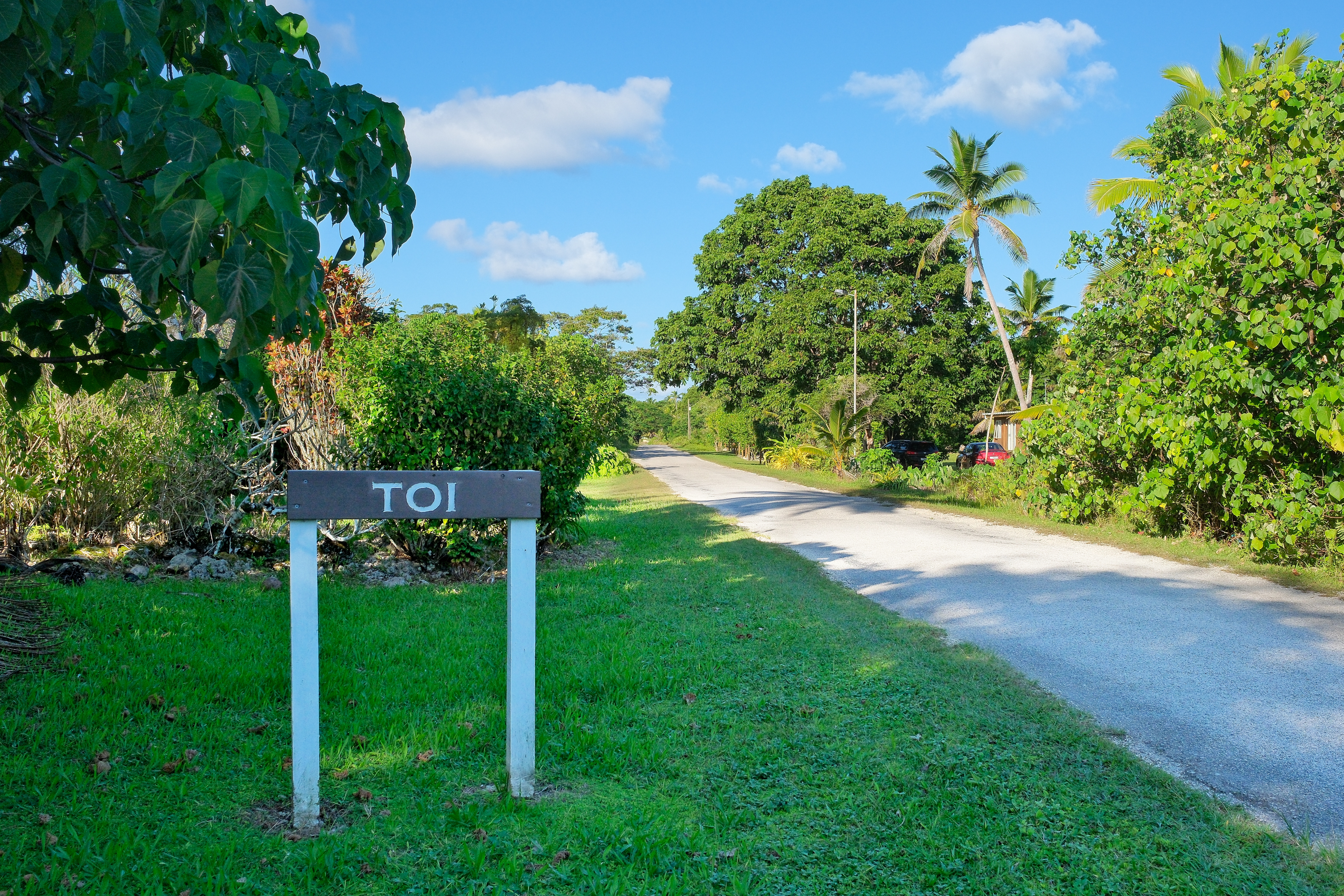

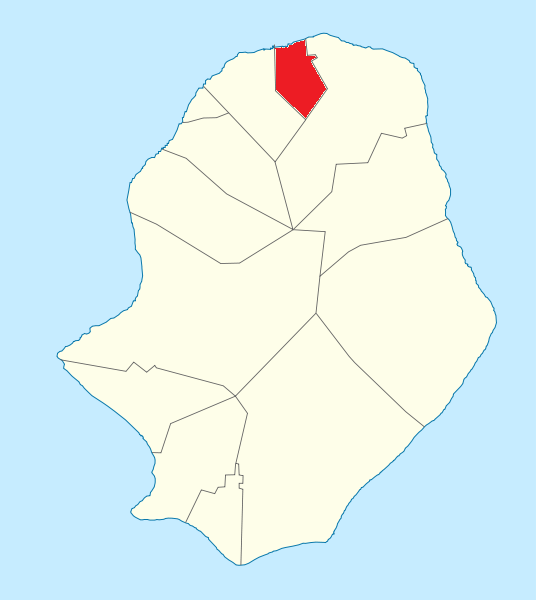
- Toi council within Niue

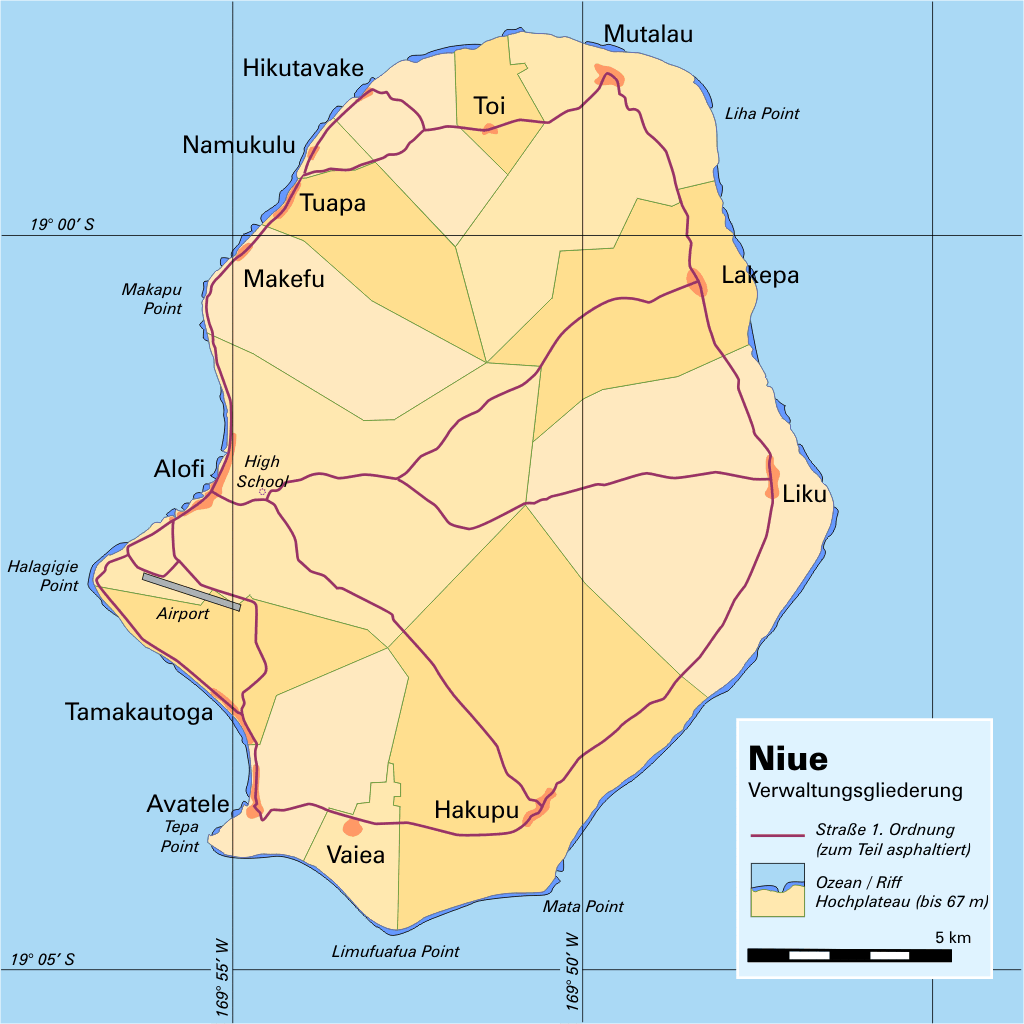
- Administrative map of Niue showing all the villages
- Coordinates: 18°58′21″S 169°50′42″W
- Country: Niue
- Tribal Area: Motu

Area
  - Total: 4.77 km^{2} (1.84 sq mi)

Population (2022)
  - Total: 32
  - Density: 6.71/km^{2} (17.4/sq mi)
- Time zone: UTC-11 (UTC-11)
- Area code: +683

Toi is one of the fourteen villages of Niue, located in the north of the island, close to the highest point and consisting mostly of agricultural land. It is about 11 kilometres (6.8 mi) northeast of the capital Alofi and the closest town is Hikutavake, a 3.5 kilometres (2.2 mi) drive westwards. Its population as of the 2022 census was 32, up from 17 in 2017.

== Geography and location ==
Toi is a tiny village located in the north of Niue, close to the highest point on the island at 69 metres (226 ft), and consists mostly of agricultural land. It is about 11 kilometres (6.8 mi) northeast of the capital Alofi and the closest town is Hikutavake, located a 3.5 kilometres (2.2 mi) drive westwards.

== Etymology ==
The meaning of the name Toi is Alphitonia zizyphoides, a species of buckthorn moderately common in the South Pacific islands.

== Demographics ==
The population of Toi has undergone significant changes over the past four decades. In the 1981 Niue census, Toi had a recorded population of 119, which steadily declined in subsequent decades: to 91 in 1986, 41 in 1991, and down to 31 by 2001, where it remained stable through 2006. Between 2011 and 2017, the population further decreased from 25 to 17 residents.

However, the 2022 Niue census revealed a remarkable turnaround for Toi, with the population increasing by 88.2%, the largest percentage increase among all villages in Niue. This growth corresponds to an increase of 15 people, bringing the total population up to 32.

The 2022 data also provide insight into the village's demographic composition and housing situation. Of the 32 residents recorded on census night, 12 were male and 20 were female. In terms of dwellings, Toi had 24 in total: 12 were occupied, 4 were vacant, and 8 were classified as derelict at the time of the census.

Covering an area of 4.77 square kilometers, Toi's population density in 2022 stood at approximately 6.9 people per square kilometer.
