= Village Park (stadium) =

Coordinates: 19.1306°S 169.844°W

Hakupu School Ground or Village Park, as it known to the local people, is a stadium based in Hakupu, a village in Niue. It is named after the Hakupu School and has a capacity of 200. The venue is home to the local club, Hakupu FC.
