= List of villages in Niue =

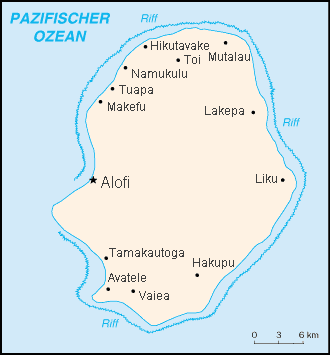
Villages of Niue

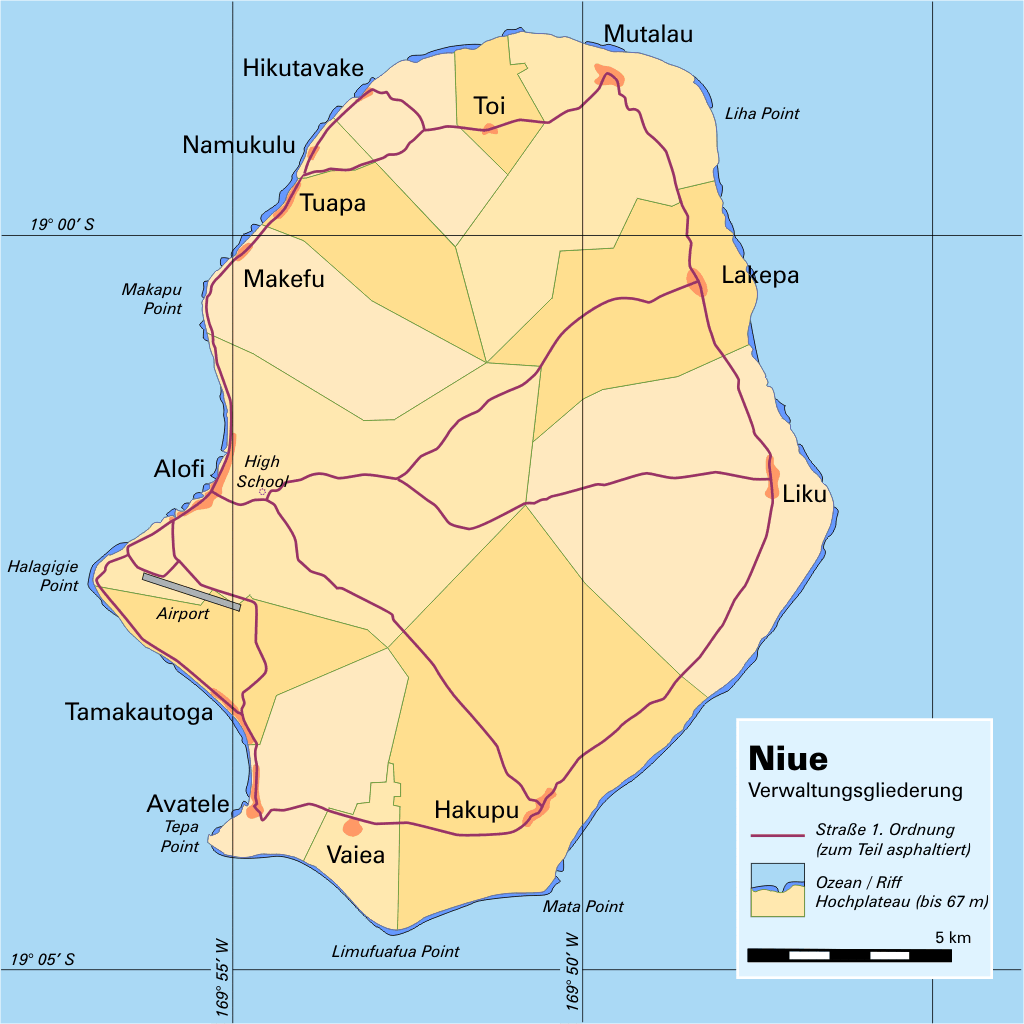
Administrative village boundaries

Niue is subdivided into 14 villages (that is, municipalities). Each village has a village council that elects its chairman. The villages are at the same time electoral districts. Each village sends an assemblyman to the Parliament of Niue.

== List ==
The table lists the villages with population and area. These are the administrative subdivisions of Niue. Some of them include smaller settlements and hamlets.

The villages Alofi North and Alofi South together serve as the capital of Niue, Alofi (pop. 614). In the following table, the villages are listed in clockwise order.

Motu (historical tribal area in the north)
Village	Population (2017 census)	Population (2022 census)	Area in km^{2}	Population density (per km^{2}) 2022
Makefu	64	73	17.13	4.8
Tuapa	106	103	12.54	7.3
Namukulu	10	9	1.48	5.4
Hikutavake	45	39	10.17	4.8
Toi	17	32	4.77	6.9
Mutalau	98	77	26.31	3.6
Lakepa	91	95	21.58	5.1
Liku	88	74	41.64	1.8

Tafiti (historical tribal area in the south)
Village	Population (2017 census)	Population (2022 census)	Area in km^{2}	Population density (per km^{2}) 2022
Hakupu	190	180	48.04	4.1
Vaiea	103	81	5.40	15.9
Avatele	139	128	13.99	9.6
Tamakautoga	198	180	11.93	11.2
Alofi South	413	423	46.48	13.0
Alofi North	157	187	46.48	13.0
Niue	1,719	1,681	261.46	6.5
