= Stan Kalauni =

Niuean politician

Stan Kalauni is a Niuean politician and businessman, and former member of the Niuean Assembly.

== Business career ==
Kalauni established Niue Vanilla International, a family business in 1991. The company produces organic vanilla and exports to Australia, New Zealand and was exploring expanding into Russia. Kalauni assisted a number of grower by buying their crops after Cyclone Heta caused major damage to the island.

== Politics ==
Kalauni was first elected to the Niuean Assembly in the 2011 election, on the common roll that takes the whole island as a single constituency, and has been re-elected in the 2014, 2017 and 2020. In the 2014 he received the highest number of votes on the common roll with 450. Following that election he was nominated as the unofficial opposition to the premiership of Toke Talagi.

In 2013, Kalauni pushed to have the director of Niue Tourism dumped. Kalauni argued that tourism was a major part of the Niue economy, and the country was not getting value for their investment.

During the COVID-19 pandemic, Kalauni backed a travel bubble between Pacific Islands that had not been significantly affected by the disease.

He retired at the 2023 election.
