= Alofi =

Capital of Niue

- Capital city and Village
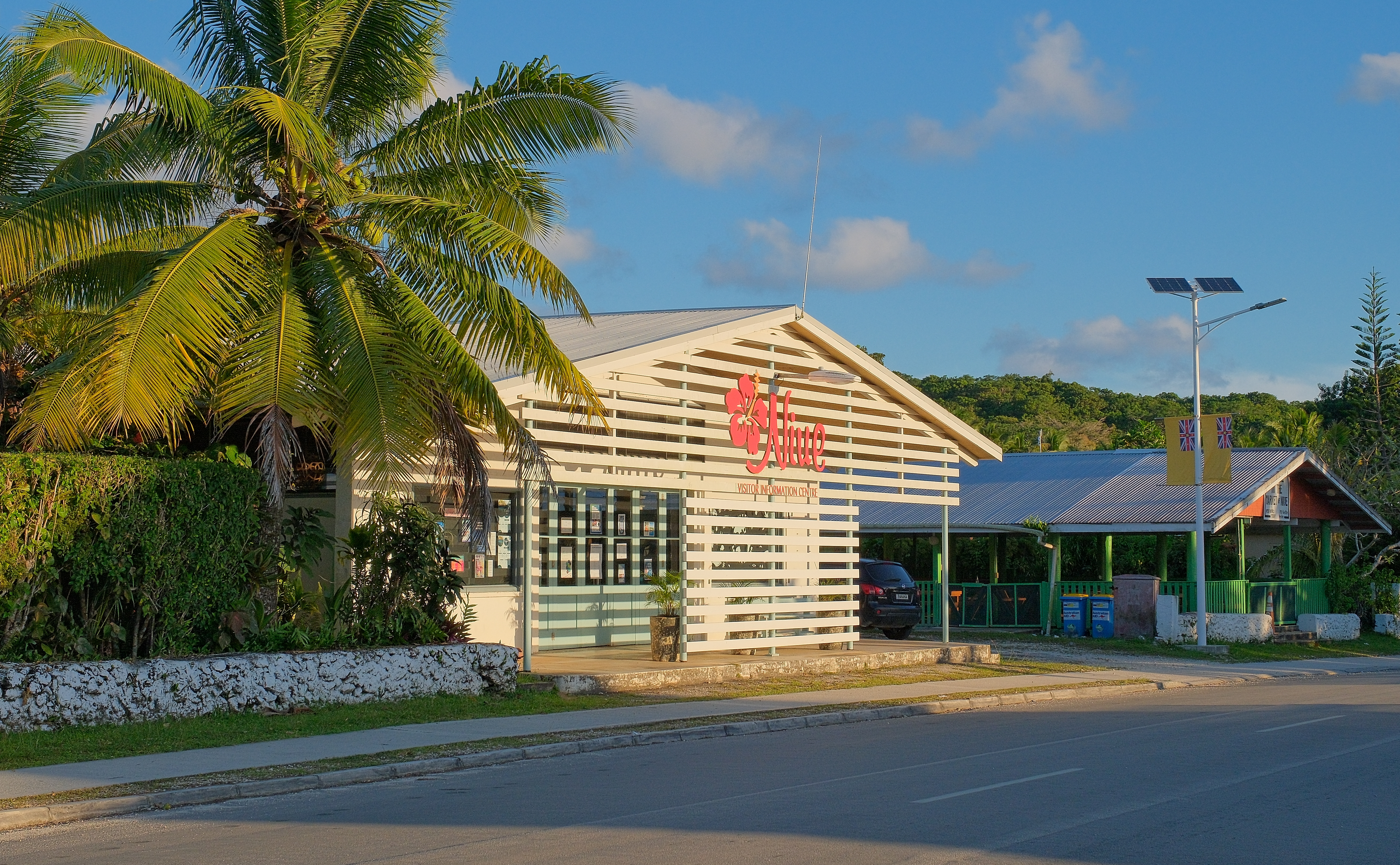
- A street in Alofi

- Alofi council within Niue

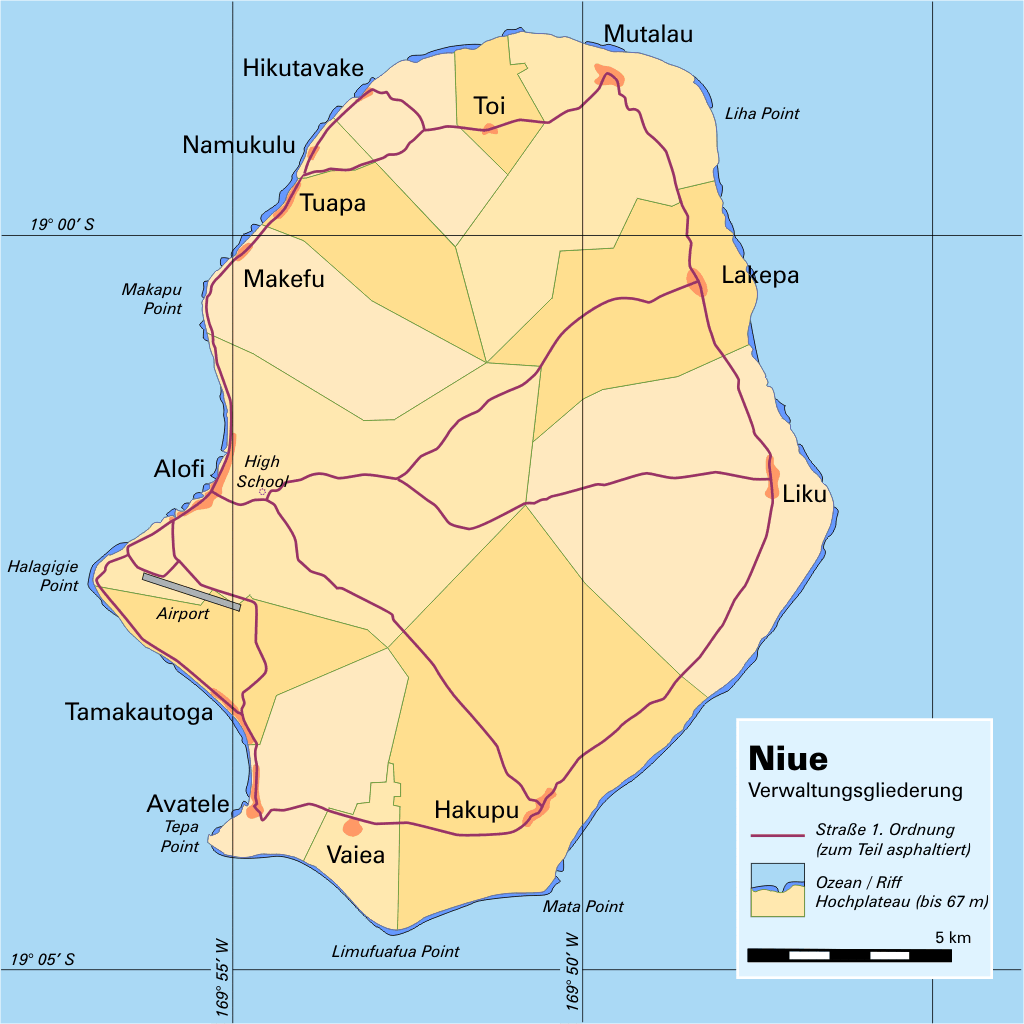
- Administrative map of Niue showing all the villages. Alofi is on the western side of the island

- Location in Niue Location in Oceania
- Coordinates: 19°03′15″S 169°55′10″W
- Country: Niue
- Free association with: New Zealand
- Tribal Area: Tafiti
- Village: Alofi North and Alofi South

Government
  - Assemblyman of Alofi North: Vaiga Tukuitoga
  - Assemblyman of Alofi South: Dalton Tagelagi

Area
  - Area of both Alofi North and Alofi South: 46.48 km^{2} (17.95 sq mi)
- Elevation: 21 m (69 ft)

Population (2022)
  - Total: 610
  - Density: 13.12/km^{2} (34.0/sq mi)
  - Alofi North: 187
  - Alofi South: 423

Resident Population
  - Visitors (Alofi North): 6,214
  - Visitor (Alofi South): 6,214
- Time zone: UTC-11:00 (NUT)
- Area code: +683

Alofi is the capital of the island nation of Niue. With a population of 610 in 2022, Alofi is the second-smallest national capital by population (after Ngerulmud, capital of Palau). It consists of two villages: Alofi North and Alofi South. They collectively serve as the capital, but of the two, Alofi South hosts more government buildings, as many were moved to the southern part after Cyclone Heta.

== History ==
In 1922 the first hospital in Niue opened in Alofi.

In January 2004, Niue was hit by the fierce tropical storm Cyclone Heta, which killed two people and did extensive damage to the entire island. Many of Alofi's buildings were destroyed, including the hospital. Government buildings were shifted to a less exposed site 3 km (≈ 2 mi) inland from the west coast, named Fonuakula, after the storm. This site is within the village boundaries of Alofi South.

== Geography ==
=== Overview ===
It is located at the centre of Alofi Bay on the west coast of the island, close to the only break in the coral reef that surrounds Niue. The bay stretches for 30% of the island's length (about seven kilometres) from Halagigie Point in the south to Makapu Point in the north.

The council's territory borders with Avatele, Hakupu, Lakepa, Liku, Makefu, Mutalau, Tamakautoga and Tuapa.

=== Climate ===
Alofi

Climate chart (precipitation, max. and min. temperature)
J	F	M	A	M	J	J	A	S	O	N	D
260 28 23	250 29 24	300 28 24	200 27 23	130 26 22	80 26 21	90 25 20	100 25 20	100 26 21	120 26 21	140 27 22	190 28 23
- █ Average max. and min. temperatures in °C
- █ Precipitation totals in mm
- Source: Weatherbase
Imperial conversion
J	F	M	A	M	J	J	A	S	O	N	D
10 82 73	9.8 84 75	12 82 75	7.9 81 73	5.1 79 72	3.1 79 70	3.5 77 68	3.9 77 68	3.9 79 70	4.7 79 70	5.5 81 72	7.5 82 73
- █ Average max. and min. temperatures in °F
- █ Precipitation totals in inches

Alofi features a tropical rainforest climate under the Köppen climate classification, with no discernible dry season. The city has a noticeably drier stretch from June through September. However, all of these months average more than 60 mm (2.4 in) of rain, the limit for a dry season month. Average temperatures vary slightly throughout the course of the year in Alofi hovering at around 27 °C (81 °F), during the warmest month (February) and at around 23 °C (73 °F) during the coolest months (July and August).

Climate data for Alofi
Month	Jan	Feb	Mar	Apr	May	Jun	Jul	Aug	Sep	Oct	Nov	Dec	Year
Record high °C (°F)	38 (100)	38 (100)	32 (90)	36 (97)	30 (86)	32 (90)	35 (95)	37 (99)	36 (97)	31 (88)	37 (99)	36 (97)	38 (100)
Mean daily maximum °C (°F)	28 (82)	29 (84)	28 (82)	27 (81)	26 (79)	26 (79)	25 (77)	25 (77)	26 (79)	26 (79)	27 (81)	28 (82)	27 (81)
Daily mean °C (°F)	26 (79)	27 (81)	26 (79)	25 (77)	25 (77)	23 (73)	22 (72)	23 (73)	23 (73)	24 (75)	25 (77)	26 (79)	25 (77)
Mean daily minimum °C (°F)	23 (73)	24 (75)	24 (75)	23 (73)	22 (72)	21 (70)	20 (68)	20 (68)	21 (70)	21 (70)	22 (72)	23 (73)	22 (72)
Record low °C (°F)	20 (68)	20 (68)	20 (68)	14 (57)	15 (59)	13 (55)	11 (52)	11 (52)	15 (59)	15 (59)	11 (52)	17 (63)	11 (52)
Average precipitation mm (inches)	261.6 (10.30)	253.6 (9.98)	305.6 (12.03)	202.6 (7.98)	138.2 (5.44)	88.9 (3.50)	96.4 (3.80)	105.8 (4.17)	102.4 (4.03)	123.8 (4.87)	145.5 (5.73)	196.2 (7.72)	2,018.4 (79.46)
Source: Weatherbase

== Transport ==
The town is serviced by Niue International Airport. There are also numerous roads, both paved and dirt, that crisscross the town.

The island's main seaport is Sir Roberts Wharf. It is close to the centre of Alofi, within 200 metres of the capital's post office and just to the north of the Chamber of Commerce building. It is a small wharf, capable—due to the island's topography—of only handling smaller flat-bottomed boats. Larger cargo vessels and fishing boats moor near the reef, and barges are used to offload cargo. Major strengthening, extension work, and renovations to the wharf were commissioned in 2020, after cyclone damage earlier in the year.

== Notable people ==
- Dalton Tagelagi (born 1968), politician
- Sam Pata Emani Tagelagi (1935–2011), politician

== See also ==
- Niue High School
- List of villages in Niue
- Huanaki Cultural Centre & Museum
- List of national capitals

== Notes ==
=== Sources ===
- East-West Center (20 January 2009). "Niue recovery at $23 million, Alofi to be relocated". East-West Center. East-West Center.
- NZ Ministry of Foreign Affairs and Trade (22 June 2009). "Niue – Country Information Paper – NZ Ministry of Foreign Affairs and Trade". NZ Ministry of Foreign Affairs and Trade.
- Siosikefu, Margaret Hagen; Haberkorn, Gerald (2008). Niue population profile based on 2006 census of population and housing: a guide for planners and policy-makers (PDF). Nouméa, New Caledonia: Secretariat of the Pacific Community. pp. 4–5. ISBN 978-982-00-0235-7. AACR2 304.609 9626. Archived (PDF) from the original on 13 November 2009.
- "Weatherbase: Historical Weather for Alofi, Niue". Weatherbase. 2009.
