= Tuapa =

- Village
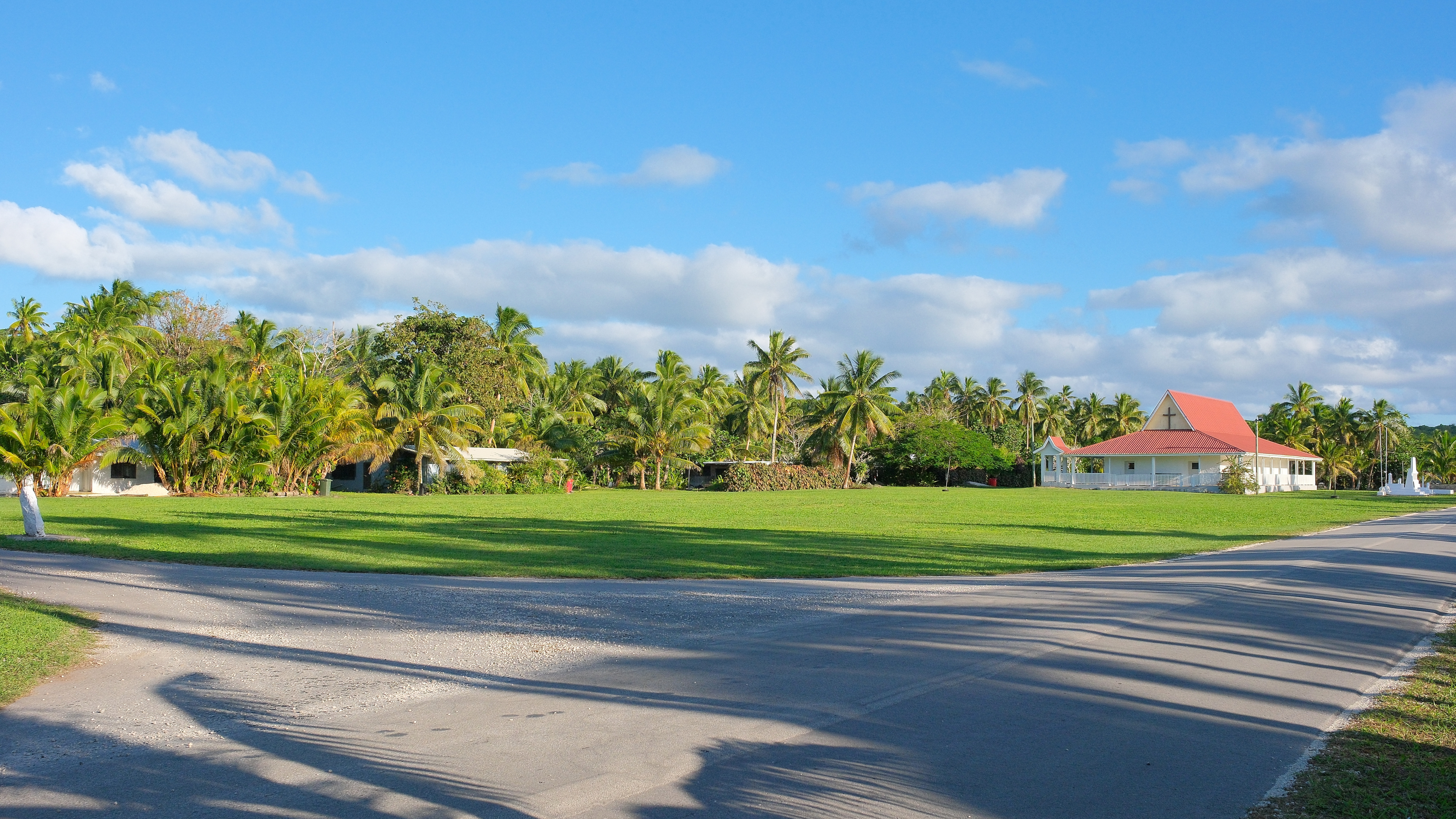

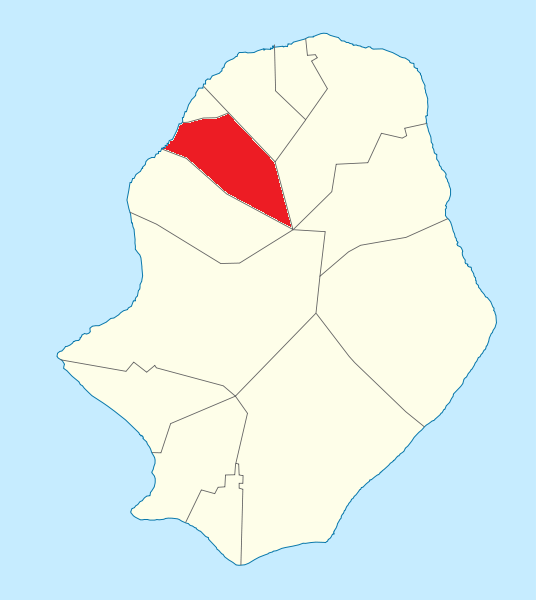
- Tuapa council within Niue

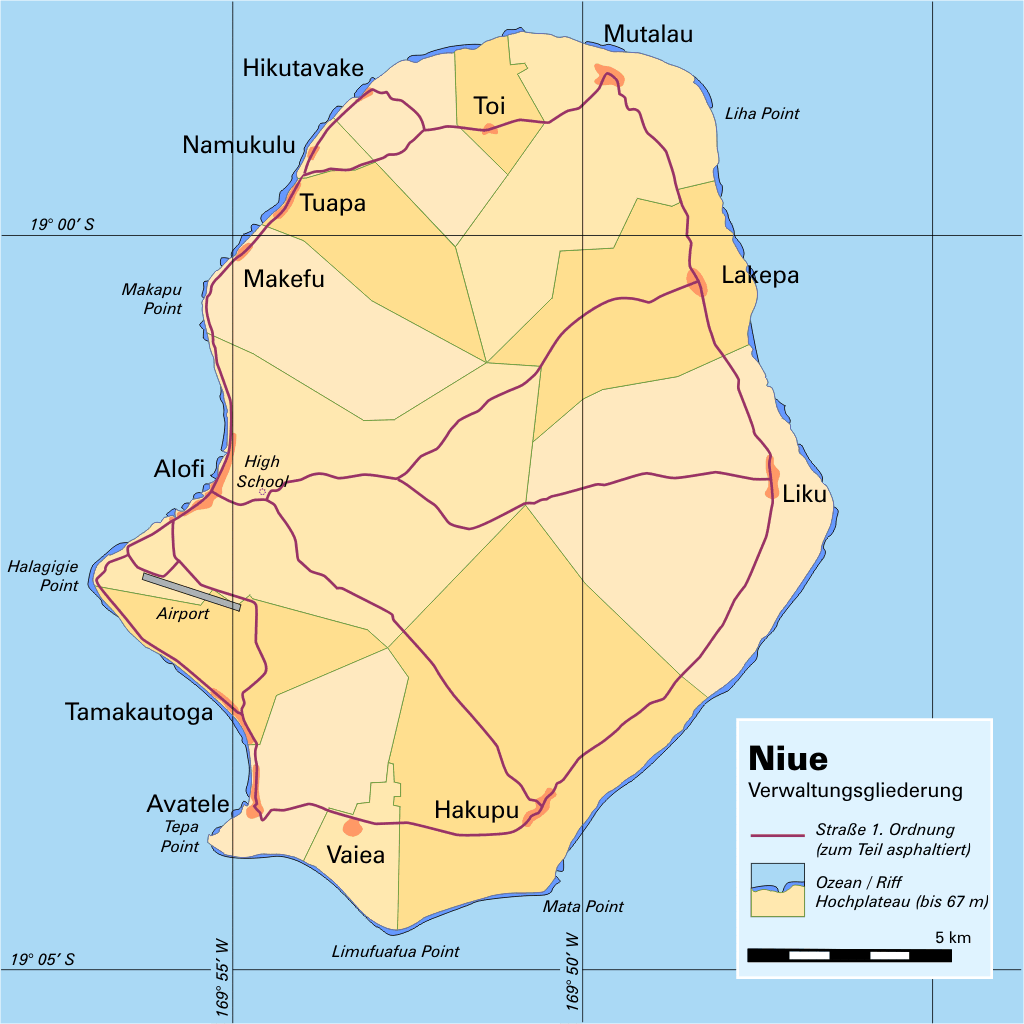
- Administrative map of Niue showing all the villages
- Coordinates: 18°57′S 169°54′W
- Country: Niue
- Tribal Area: Motu

Area
  - Total: 12.54 km^{2} (4.84 sq mi)

Population (2022)
  - Total: 103
  - Density: 8.21/km^{2} (21.3/sq mi)
- Time zone: UTC-11 (UTC-11)
- Area code: +683

Tuapa is one of the fourteen villages of Niue. Its population at the 2022 census was 103, down from 106 in 2017.

Villagers from Tuapa established the villages of Makefu, Hikutavake, and Namukulu.
