= Vaiea =

- Village
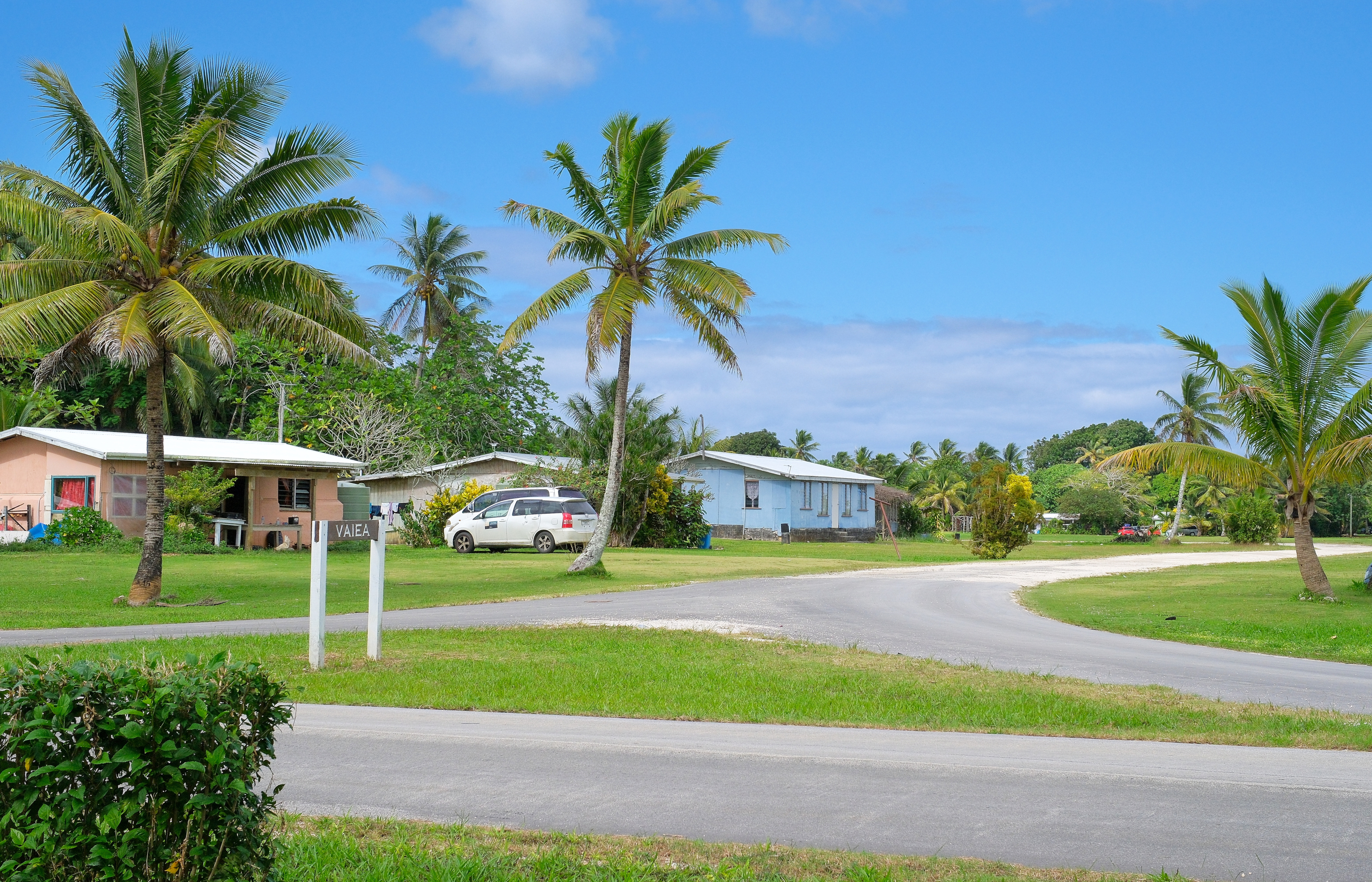

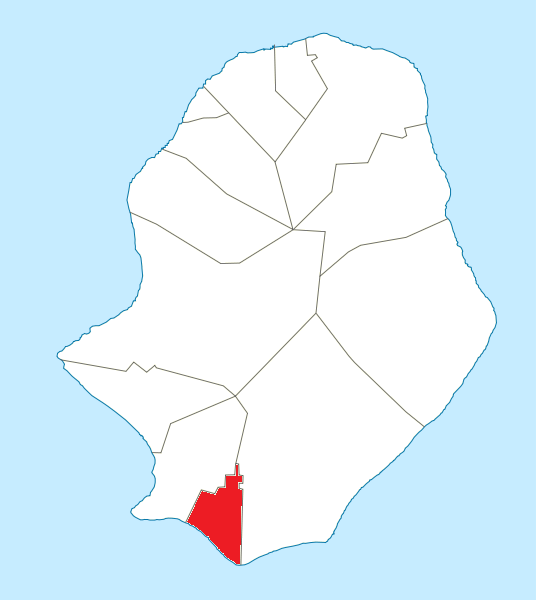
- Vaiea council within Niue

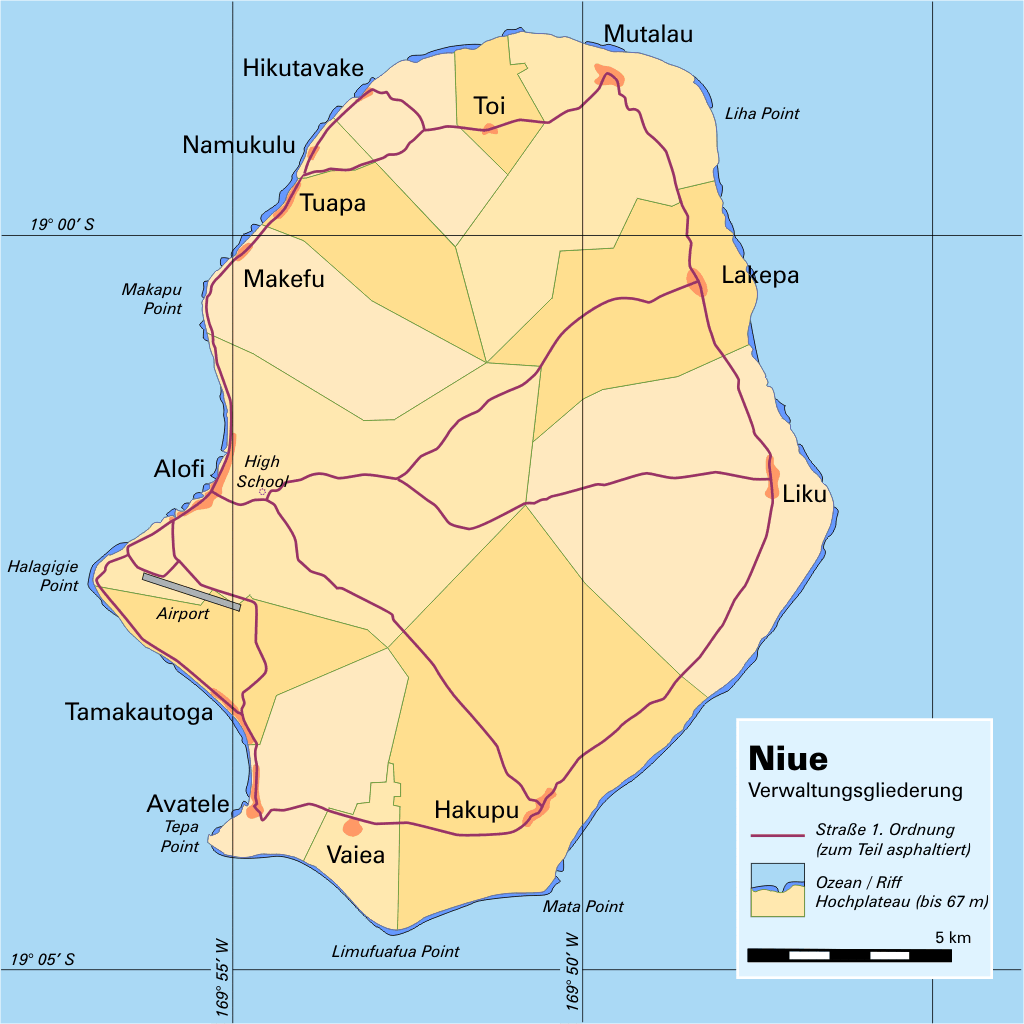
- Administrative map of Niue showing all the villages
- Coordinates: 19°07′48″S 169°53′03″W
- Country: Niue
- Tribal Area: Tafiti

Area
  - Total: 5.40 km^{2} (2.08 sq mi)

Population (2022)
  - Total: 81
  - Density: 15/km^{2} (39/sq mi)
- Time zone: UTC-11 (UTC-11)
- Area code: +683

Vaiea is one of the fourteen villages of Niue. Its population was 81 at the 2022 census.
