= Hikutavake =

- Village
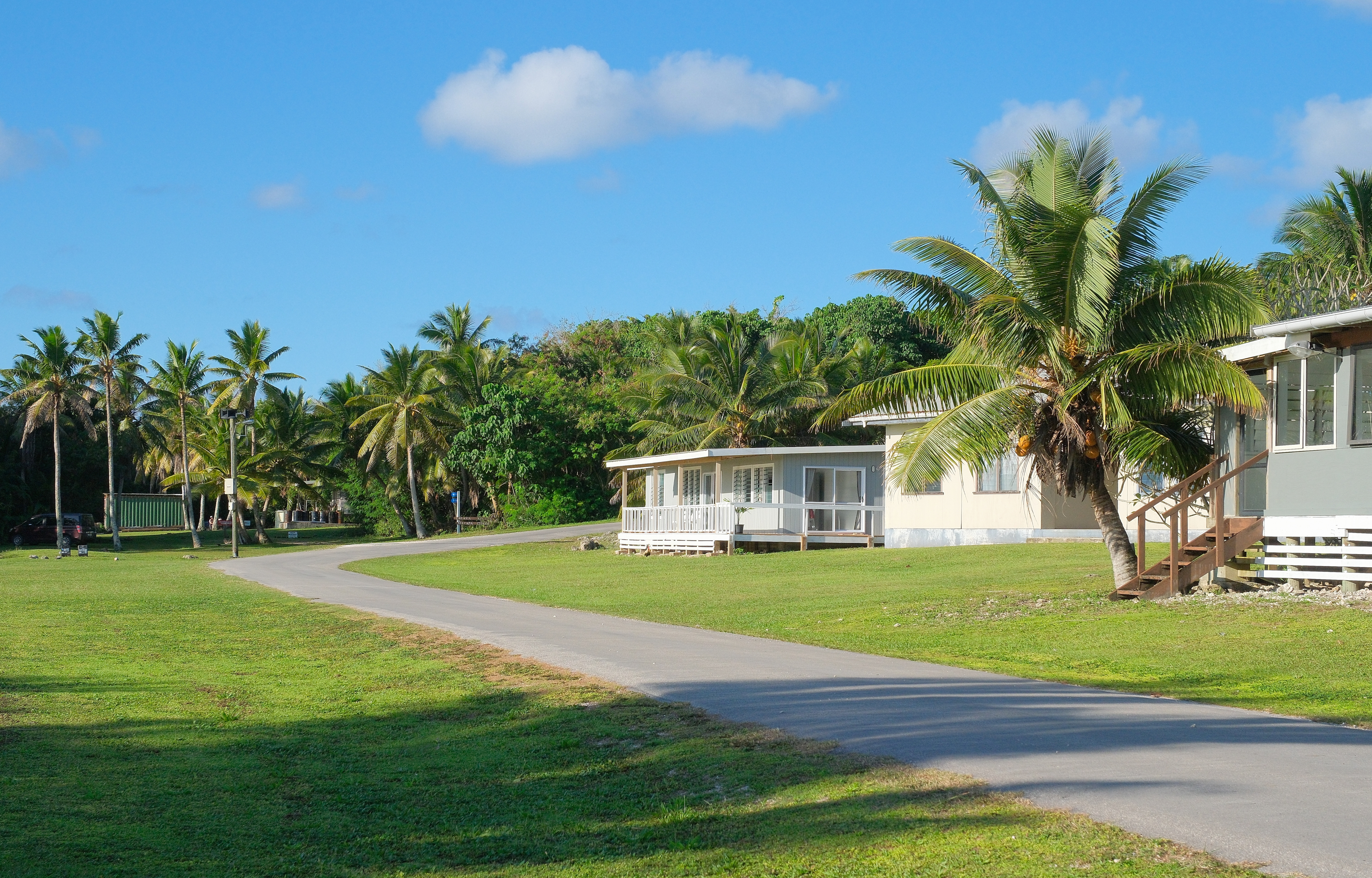

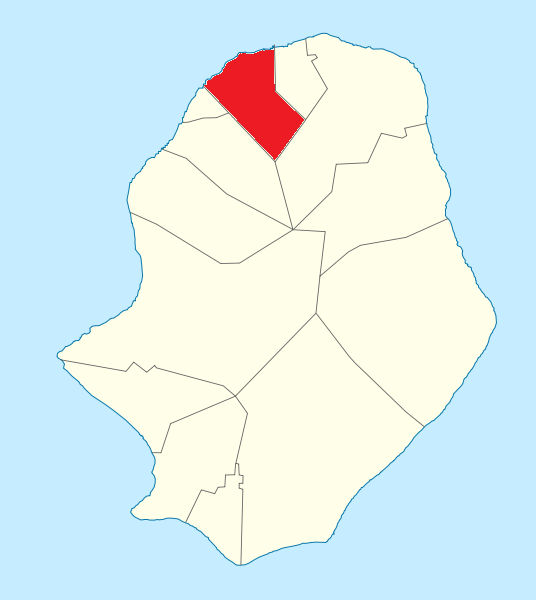
- Hikutavake council within Niue

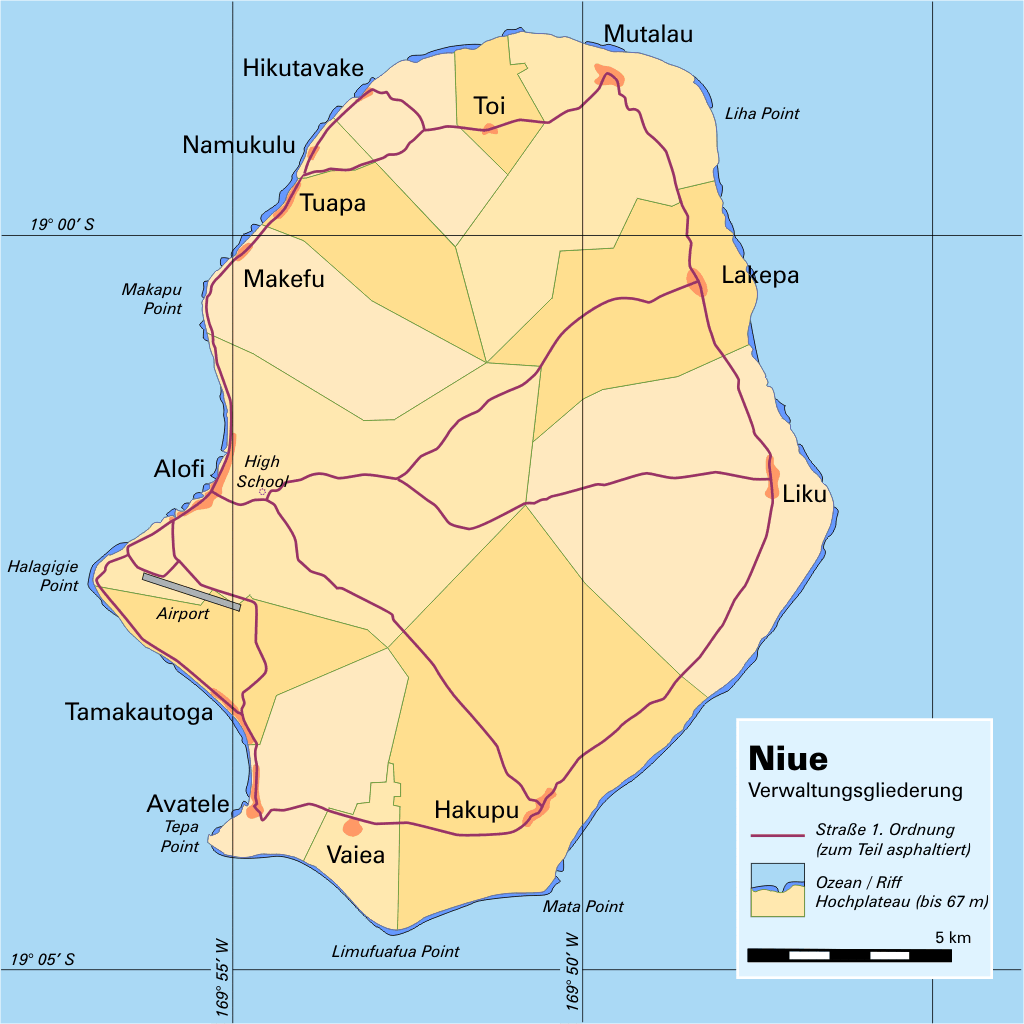
- Administrative map of Niue showing all the villages
- Coordinates: 18°57′54″S 169°52′53″W
- Country: Niue
- Tribal Area: Motu

Area
  - Total: 10.17 km^{2} (3.93 sq mi)

Population (2022)
  - Total: 39
  - Density: 3.83/km^{2} (9.9/sq mi)
- Time zone: UTC-11 (UTC-11)
- Area code: +683

Hikutavake is one of the fourteen villages of Niue. Its population at the 2022 census was 39, down from 45 in 2017.

The village was established by villagers from Tuapa.

== Location & geography ==
About 95% of the land surface is coral rock.

There is a trail on the north side of Niue that leads to a clifftop to an enclosed reef with natural pools, some of them are 10 metres deep and 25 metres across.
