= Makefu =

- Village
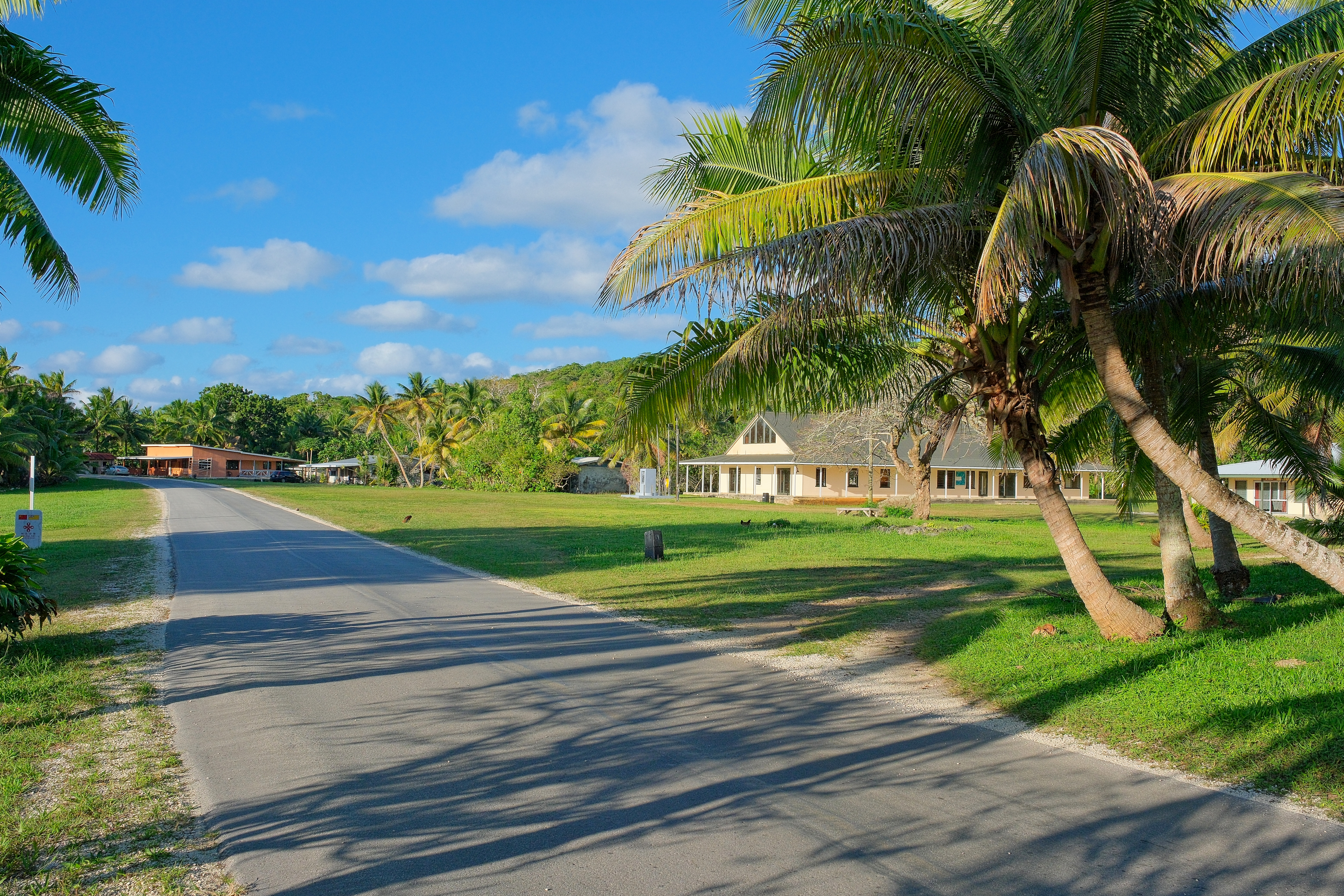

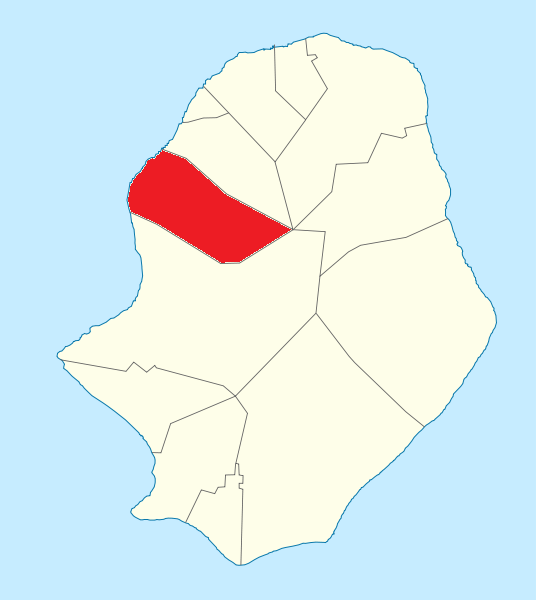
- Makefu council within Niue

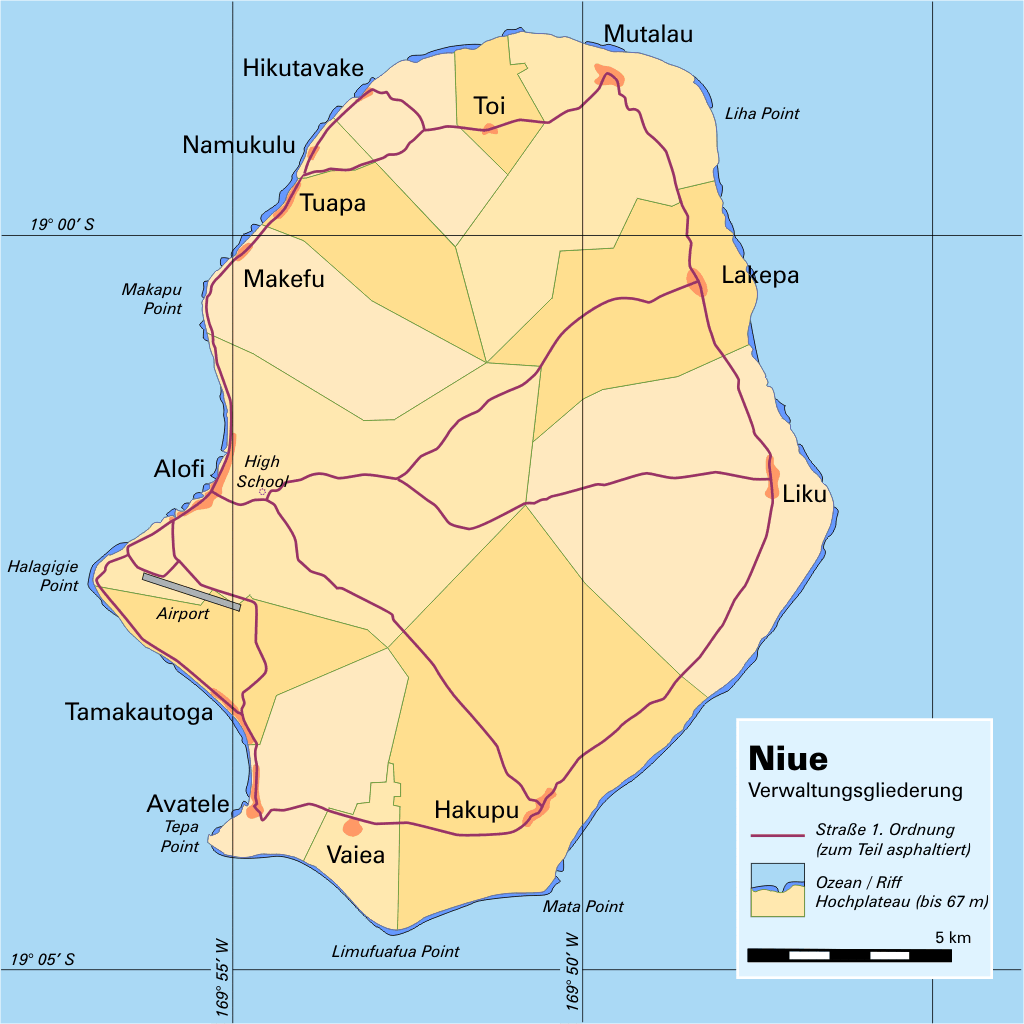
- Administrative map of Niue showing all the villages
- Coordinates: 18°59′S 169°55′W
- Country: Niue
- Tribal Area: Motu

Area
  - Total: 17.13 km^{2} (6.61 sq mi)

Population (2022)
  - Total: 73
  - Density: 4.26/km^{2} (11.0/sq mi)
- Time zone: UTC-11 (UTC-11)
- Area code: +683

Makefu is one of the fourteen villages of Niue. Its population at the 2022 census was 73, up from 64 in 2017.

The village was established by villagers from Tuapa.
