= Lakepa =

- Village
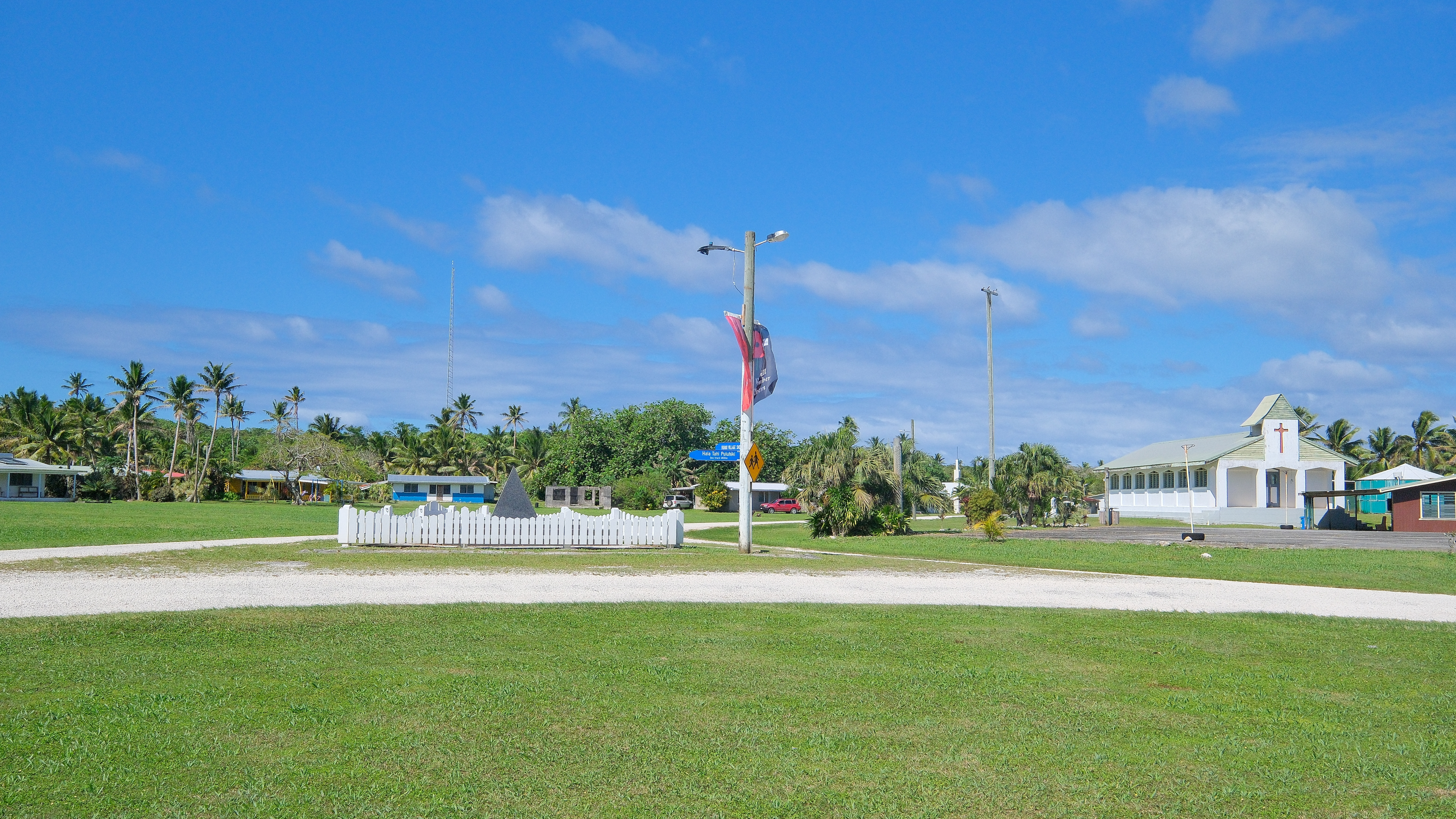

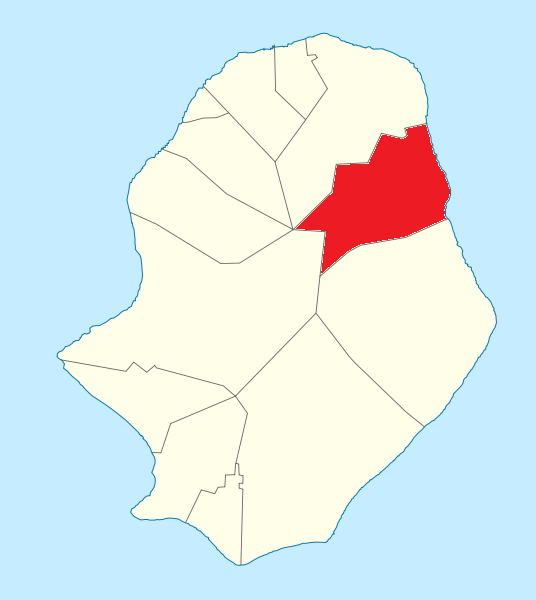
- Lakepa council within Niue

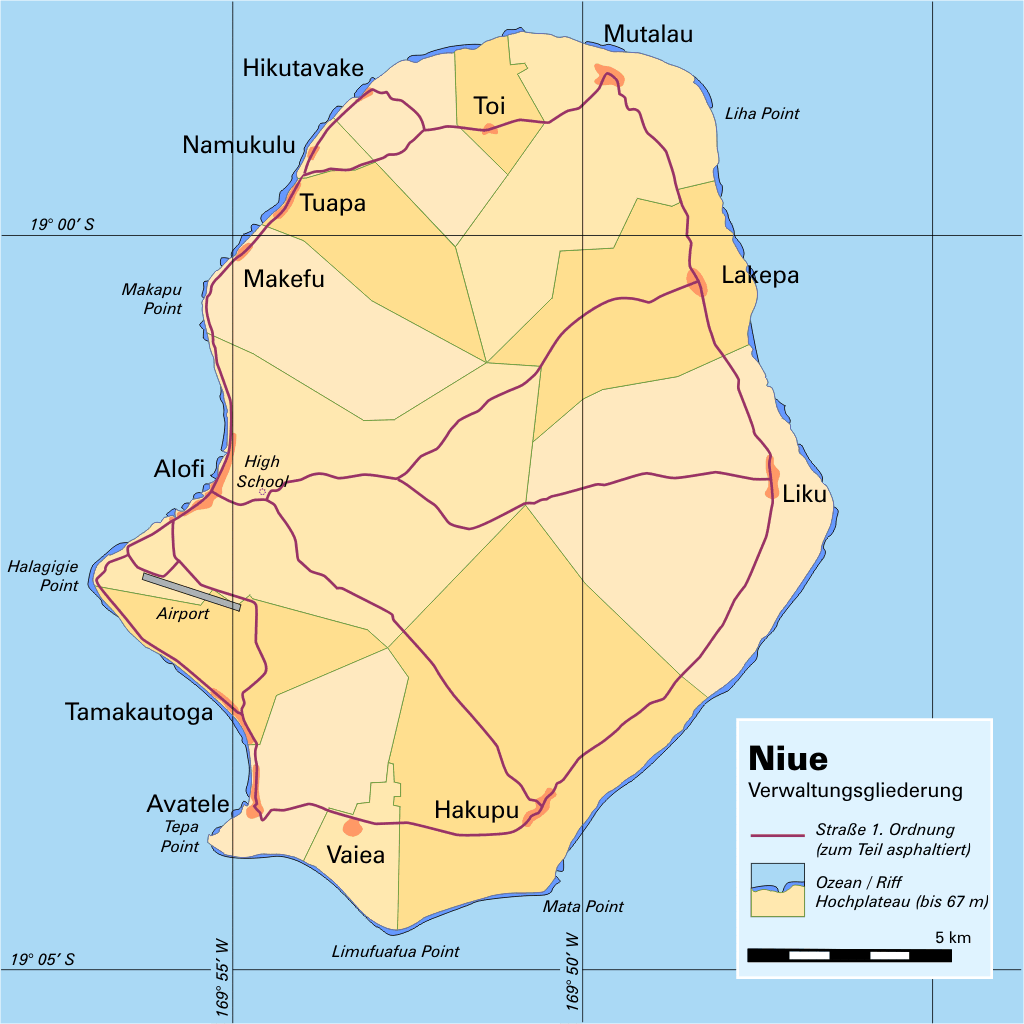
- Administrative map of Niue showing all the villages
- Coordinates: 19°0′40″S 169°48′21″W
- Country: Niue
- Tribal Area: Motu

Area
  - Total: 21.58 km^{2} (8.33 sq mi)
- Elevation: 50 m (160 ft)

Population (2022)
  - Total: 95
  - Density: 4.4/km^{2} (11/sq mi)
- Time zone: UTC-11 (UTC-11)
- Area code: +683

Lakepa is one of the fourteen villages of Niue. It is one of the small amount of villages located on the east coast. Its population at the 2022 census was 95, up from 91 in 2017.
