= UTC−11:00 =

Time zone

- Time zone
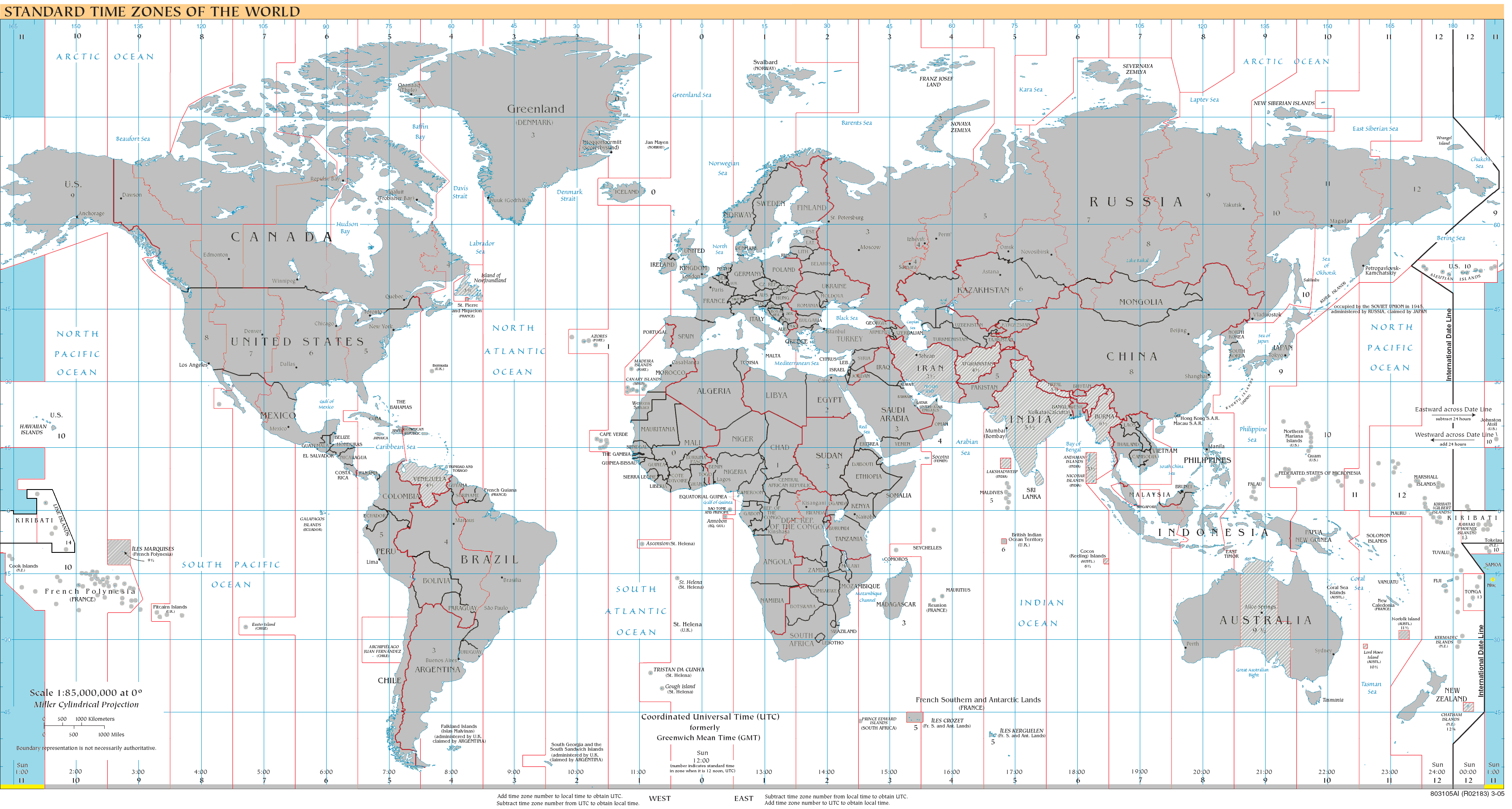
- World map with the time zone highlighted

UTC offset
- UTC: UTC−11:00

Current time
- 06:39, 4 July 2026 UTC−11:00 [refresh]

Central meridian
- 165 degrees W

Date-time group
- X

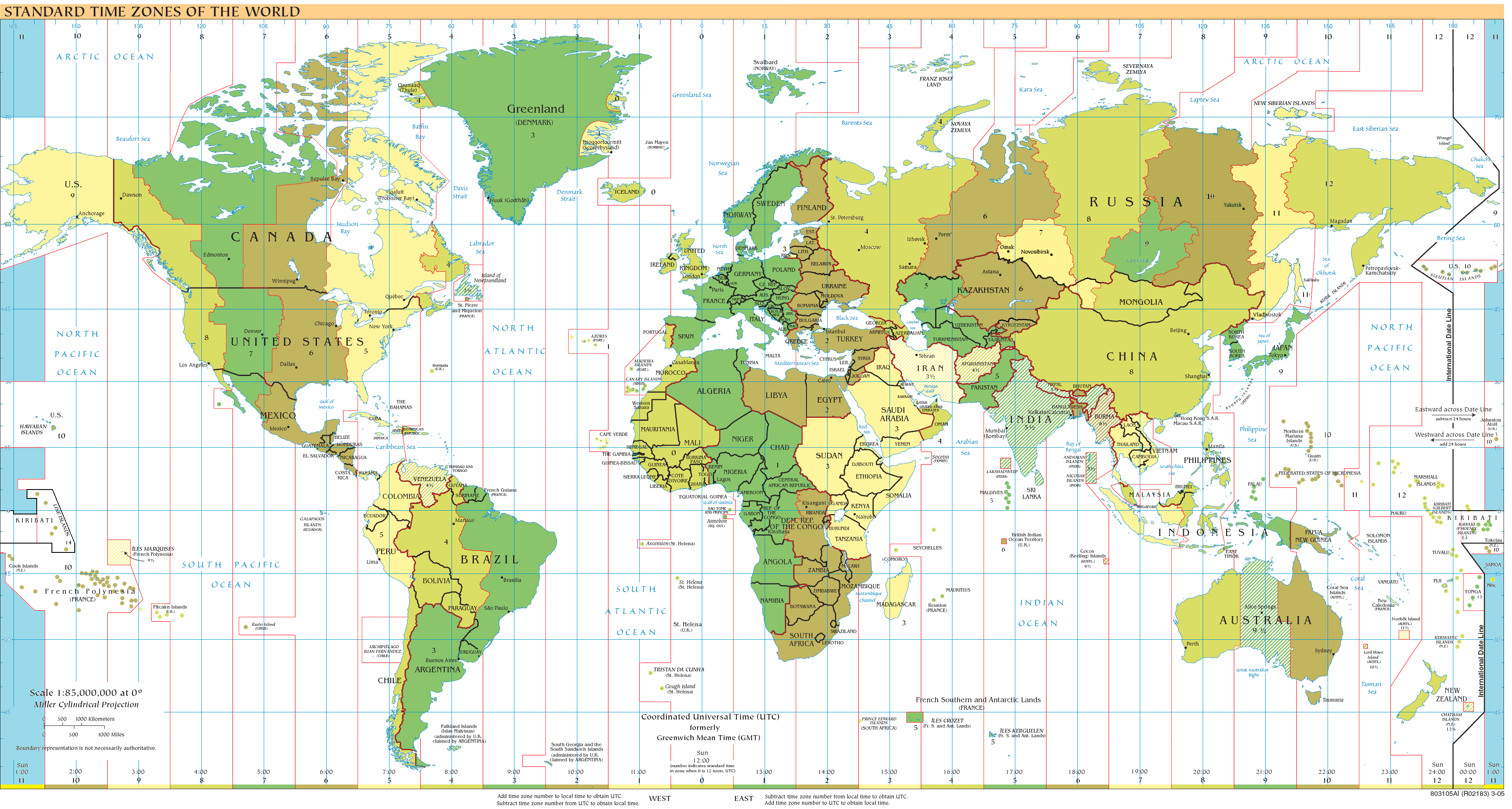
UTC−11:00: blue (December), orange (June), yellow (year-round), light blue (sea areas)

UTC−11:00 is an identifier for a time offset from UTC of −11:00. This time is used in Niue, American Samoa, Swains Island, and parts of the United States Minor Outlying Islands. This is the latest inhabited time zone, meaning this is the last inhabited time zone to celebrate the New Year, as the world's latest time zone (UTC-12:00) occurs only in strict nature reserves, such as Howland and Baker Island.

== As standard time (year-round) ==
Principal settlements: Alofi, Pago Pago, Tafuna

=== Oceania ===
==== Pacific Ocean ====
===== Polynesia =====
- Niue
- United States – Samoa Time Zone
  - American Samoa
  - United States Minor Outlying Islands
    - Jarvis Island
    - Kingman Reef
    - Midway Atoll
    - Palmyra Atoll

== Formerly within ==
- Kiribati
  - Phoenix Islands (of which only Canton Island is inhabited) (Phoenix Islands Time) advanced 24 hours to the Eastern Hemisphere side of the International Date Line by skipping December 31, 1994.
- New Zealand
  - Tokelau – Time in Tokelau advanced 24 hours to the Eastern Hemisphere side of the International Date Line by skipping December 30, 2011.
- Samoa – Time in Samoa advanced 24 hours to the Eastern Hemisphere side of the International Date Line by skipping December 30, 2011.
- United States
  - Bering Standard Time – Before Alaska Standard Time was adopted across almost all of Alaska (other than the Aleutian Islands, which adopted the Hawaii–Aleutian Time Zone) in 1983, Nome, and the Aleutian Islands were previously in Bering Standard time.

== Discrepancies between official UTC−11:00 and geographical UTC−11:00 ==
=== Areas in UTC−11:00 longitudes using other time zones ===
Using UTC−9:00:

- United States
  - The western part of Alaskan mainland, including Nome

Using UTC−10:00:

- United States
  - The easternmost of the Aleutian Islands

Using UTC+12:00:

- Russia
  - The easternmost parts of Chukotka Autonomous Okrug

Using UTC+13:00:

- Samoa
- Tokelau
- Kiribati
  - Phoenix Islands
