= Telephone numbers in Oceania =

Telephone numbers in Oceania use a variety of area codes to denote their location along with their own area code depending on the country's geographic makeup. They also have other prefixes to denote different types of mobile services and international calls. There are exceptions because of regional variations and time zones.

== Australia ==
Country Code: +61
International Call Prefix: 0011
Trunk Prefix: 0

Telephone numbers in Australia consist of a single-digit area code (prefixed with a '0' when dialing within Australia) and eight-digit local numbers, the first four, five or six of which specify the exchange, and the remaining four, three or two a line at that exchange. (Most exchanges though have several exchange codes.) Within Australia, the area code is only required to call from one area code to another.

Australia is divided geographically into a small number of large area codes, some of which cover more than one state and territory. Prior to the introduction of eight-digit numbers in the early-to-mid-1990s, telephone numbers were seven digits in the major capital cities, with a double-digit area code, and six digits in other areas with a three-digit area code. There were more than sixty such codes by 1990, with numbers running out, thus spurring the reorganization.

Following reorganization of the numbering plan between 1994 and 1998, the following numbering ranges are now used:

- 00 – International and Emergency access (see below for details)
- 01 – Alternative phone services
  - 014 – Satellite phones
  - 0151 – Public safety service
  - 0163 – Pager numbers (defunct service; no longer available)
  - 0198 – Data numbers (e.g. 0198 308 888 is the dial-up PoP number for Telstra)
- 02 – Geographic: Central East region (NSW, ACT, small parts of Victoria)
- 03 – Geographic: South-east region (VIC, TAS)
- 04 – Digital Mobile services (4G, 5G and GSM)
- 0550 – Location Independent Communication Services
- 07 – Geographic: North-east region (QLD)
- 08 – Geographic: Central and West region (SA, NT, WA, small part of NSW)
- 09 – Internet of things service
- 1 – Non-geographic numbers (mostly for domestic use; see below for details)

National numbers have no geographic significance. Other numbers relate to a particular telephone service area.

However, allowances are made for regional variations; sometimes the codes do not strictly follow state borders. For example, Broken Hill in New South Wales uses the 08 area code, due to its closer proximity to Adelaide than the state capital Sydney, and Broken Hill area's inclusion in the Australian Central Standard Time zone. The previous area code for Broken Hill was (080). Other examples include towns in Southern New South Wales close to the border with Victoria that use the 03 (Victoria and Tasmania) prefix, including: Balranald, Wentworth and Deniliquin). Some parts of the Tweed Coast of New South Wales have an area code of 07 followed by a subscriber number of 55xx xxxx (and new numbers 56xx xxxx). This means it is the cost of a local call to phone the Gold Coast in neighbouring Queensland, since the metropolis covers both sides of the NSW/Qld border. It is also a local call to adjoining NSW 02 667x xxxx numbers from these areas, and other southern Gold Coast exchanges (07 prefix numbers must dial the 02 to access these).

=== Australian Antarctic Territory ===
Country Code: +672 1x
International Call Prefix: 00
Trunk Prefix:

=== Christmas Island ===
Country Code: +61 8 9164 – part of the Australian numbering system
International Call Prefix: 0011
Trunk Prefix: 0

=== Cocos (Keeling) Islands ===
Country Code: +61 8 9162 – part of the Australian numbering system
International Call Prefix: 0011
Trunk Prefix: 0

=== Norfolk Island ===
Country Code: +672 3
International Call Prefix: 00
Trunk Prefix:

== Easter Island ==
Country Code: +56 32
International Call Prefix: 00
Trunk Prefix:

== Federated States of Micronesia ==
Country Code: +691
International Call Prefix: 00
Trunk Prefix:

== Fiji ==
Country Code: +679
International Call Prefix: 00
Trunk Prefix:

== French Polynesia ==
Country Code: +689
International Call Prefix: 00
Trunk Prefix:

== Kiribati ==
Country Code: +686
International Call Prefix: 00
Trunk Prefix: 0

== Marshall Islands ==
Country Code: +692
International Call Prefix: 00
Trunk Prefix: 1

== Nauru ==
Country Code: +674
International Call Prefix: 00
Trunk Prefix:

== New Caledonia ==
Country Code: +687
International Call Prefix: 00
Trunk Prefix:

== New Zealand ==
Country Code: +64
International Call Prefix: 00
Trunk Prefix: 0

Since 1993, land-line telephone numbers in New Zealand consist of a single-digit area code and seven-digit local numbers, the first three of which generally specify the exchange and the final four a line at that exchange. The domestic long distance prefix is '0'.

The dialing plan used in NZ reflects the national structure implemented by the New Zealand Post Office prior to the privatisation of the telecommunications services (and the creation of the Telecom New Zealand corporation). Domestic phone numbers with a first digit in range 2-8 are generally managed by Telecom. Phone numbers beginning with 9 are usually those from other companies, for example TelstraClear. These allocations were firm until April 2007, whereupon full number portability was introduced; numbers can now be moved between carriers.. There are currently no regions issued numbers starting with 1 - except for the national emergency services access number, '111'.

There are five regional area codes in use for landline calls, For example, a domestic toll call destined for a South Island location requires the dial prefix '03', being domestic-long-distance + 3 for the South Island.

01	Telecom NZ Special Services (e.g. Directory 018 (Domestic) 0172 (International))
024099	Scott Base in the Ross Dependency
02	Mobile (Cellular and Paging)
03	South Island and the Chatham Islands
04	Wellington Region except the Wairarapa and parts of the Kāpiti Coast
05	"Other" network access (Non Telecom NZ services)
06	Remaining southern and eastern North Island: Taranaki; Manawatū-Whanganui except Taumarunui; Hawke's Bay; Gisborne; Wairarapa and parts of the Kāpiti Coast
07	Waikato, the Bay of Plenty and Taumarunui
08	Telecom NZ Special Services (e.g. Internet Dialup services, Toll Free)
09	Auckland and Northland

Mobile phone numbers are prefixed with 02, followed by one digit and the subscriber's number, which is either six, seven or eight digits, dialled in full, e.g. 021 xxx xxx or 027 xxx xxxx. With the introduction of number portability the number prefix is no longer a sure indicator as to the terminating network, but the following table lists the "default" mobile numbering prefixes:

020	Orcon
021	Vodafone
022	2degrees
025	Telecom TDMA (No longer in service)
026	Pager Services
027	Telecom CDMA
028	CallPlus
029	TelstraClear

Free call services generally use the prefix 0800 (via Telecom NZ) or 0508 (via TelstraClear), while local rate (usually internet access numbers) have the prefix 08xx. Premium rate services use the code 0900 followed by five digits. Neither of these are accessible internationally.

The International dialing prefix is '00', though other prefixes are available (i.e. 0161, for discounted rates, or 0168, for access to USA 1800 numbers).

To dial into New Zealand from overseas, the leading 0 should be dropped from all area codes. (For example, an 021 xxx xxxx number would be reached by dialing +64 21 xxx xxxx).

=== Cook Islands ===
Country Code: +682
International Call Prefix: 00
Trunk Prefix:

=== Niue ===
Country Code: +683
International Call Prefix: 00
Trunk Prefix:

=== Tokelau ===
Country Code: +690
International Call Prefix: 00
Trunk Prefix:

== Palau ==
Country Code: +680
International Call Prefix: 011 or 012
Trunk Prefix:

== Papua New Guinea ==
Country Code: +675
International Call Prefix: 00
Trunk Prefix:

== Pitcairn Islands ==
Country Code: +64 xx – previously +870 satellite phone only
International Call Prefix: 00
Trunk Prefix:

== Samoa ==
Country Code: +685
International Call Prefix: 0
Trunk Prefix:

== Solomon Islands ==
Country Code: +677
International Call Prefix: 00 or 01
Trunk Prefix:

== Timor-Leste ==
Country Code: +670
International Call Prefix: 00
Trunk Prefix:

== Tonga ==
Country Code: +676
International Call Prefix: 00
Trunk Prefix:

== Tuvalu ==
Country Code: +688
International Call Prefix: 00
Trunk Prefix:

== United States Territories ==
The following territories of the United States are part of the North American Numbering Plan, and no longer have their own country codes:

- +1-670 - Northern Mariana Islands from 1 July 1998 (previously +670)
- +1-671 - Guam from 1 July 1998 (previously +671)
- +1-684 - American Samoa from 2 October 2004 (previously +684)

== Vanuatu ==
Country Code: +678
International Call Prefix: 00
Trunk Prefix:

== Wallis and Futuna ==
Country Code: +681
International Call Prefix: 00
Trunk Prefix:

== See also ==
- List of country calling codes
- List of international call prefixes
- Telephone numbering plan
- Category:Telephone numbers by country
