= Alofi Bay =

Bay in Niue

Coordinates: 19.0500°S 169.9167°W

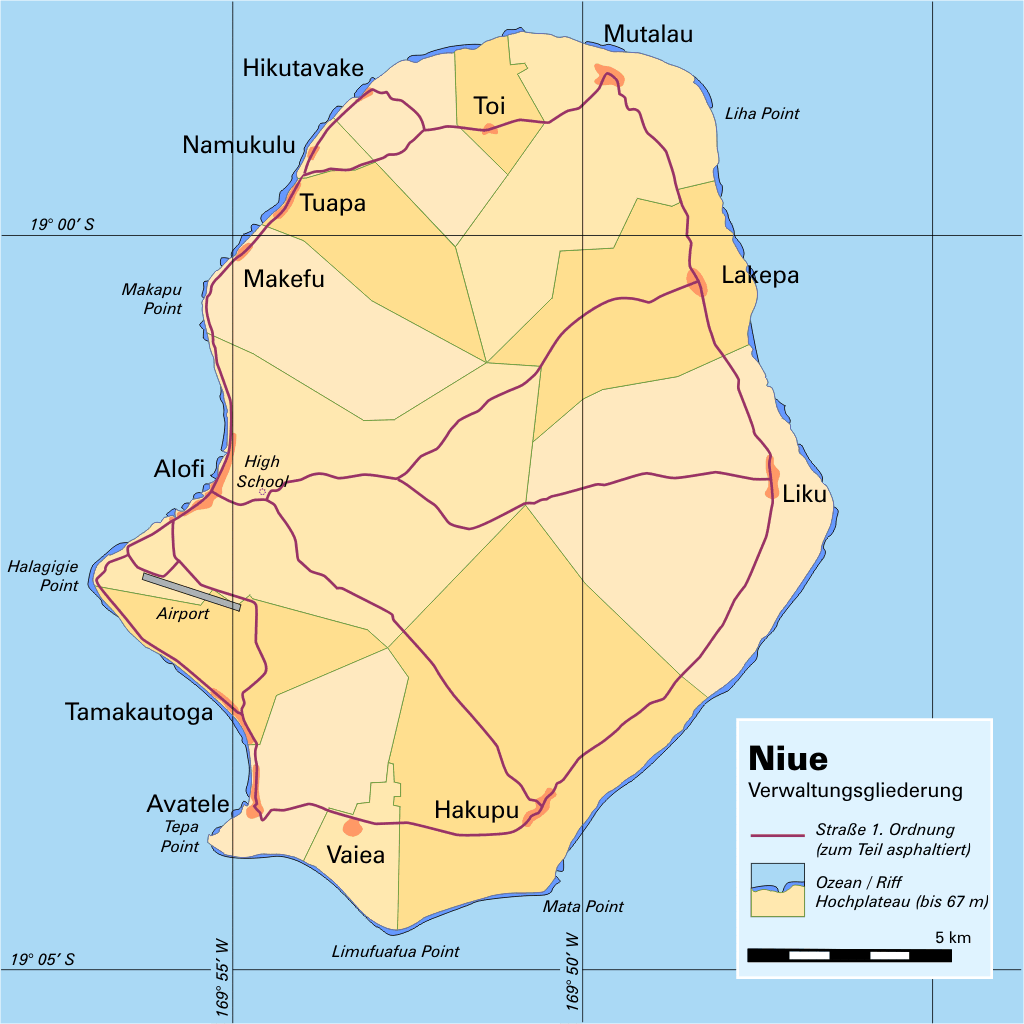
Alofi Bay is in the west

Alofi Bay is the northern of the two large bays which make up most of the west coast of the island of Niue, the other being Avatele Bay south of it. It stretches from Makapu Point in the island's northwest to Halagigie Point, the island's westernmost extremity.

The island's largest settlement, Alofi, is located close to the shore of the bay, as are the smaller settlements of Aliutu and Tufukia.

Many European vessels visited the bay in the 18 and 19 century: James Cook's HMS Resolution in 1774, HMS Calliope carrying missionaries James Povey Sunderland and Archibald Murray in 1852 and 1854, HMS Fawn in 1862 and others. From 1860s, Alofi Bay became the most popular landing site in Niue, although the landing was sometimes not allowed due to bad weather. London Missionary Society and other Europeans used the bay to load Niuean arrowroot on the boats for trade, which was later replaced by copra and woven hats as the main export. After the World War I, Alofi Bay was used to load bananas for trade.

After Niue became a British protectorate in 1990, Basil Thomson ordered that quarantine officers inspect every vessel landing at the three major bays, including Alofi Bay, for bubonic plague, which had outbreaks in Australia and New Zealand.

On the 19 October 1990, the New Zealand governor Uchter Ranfurly arrived in Alofi Bay on the board of HMS Mildura to annex Niue to New Zealand. In 1903, this bay became the port of entry for customs. The resident commissioner of Niue, Christopher Maxwell, oversaw the improvement of the wooden wharf at Alofi, replacing it with a concrete one, and the construction of a road to the wharf. When boats came to Alofi, it became the centre of local life with Niueans from all over the island gathering at the bay to socialise and trade.

When Niue offered New Zealand troops to fight in the First World War, 150 men were transported to New Zealand from Alofi Bay on the borad of Te Anau schooner in 1915. The surviving soldiers returned to the same bay in 1916.

In 1974, HMNZS Tui arrived to Alofi Bay to facilitate the constitutional referendum; a dance was organised at the wharf.
