= Resident commissioner =

Official title for representatives of any level of government

Resident commissioner was or is an official title of several different types of commissioners, who were or are representatives of any level of government. Historically, they were appointed by the British Crown in overseas protectorates (such as Bechuanaland), or colonies (such as South Australia), and some still exist in this capacity. The United States of America once had a resident commissioner in the Philippines and the Puerto Rico resident commissioner resides in Washington DC. State governments of today's Republic of India have a resident commissioner to represent them in New Delhi.

== British Empire and the Commonwealth of Nations ==
Resident commissioners appointed by the British Crown typically reside in the territorial unit of which they are in charge. This also the case with most otherwise styled commissioners. Resident commissioners were often subordinate to a high commissioner, such as with the High Commissioner for Southern Africa or the High Commissioner for the Western Pacific.

=== South Australia ===
South Australia was the only colony in Australia authorised by an Act of Parliament, the South Australia Act 1834, which set out the requirement for a governor, representing the Crown, and a resident commissioner, reporting to Colonisation commissioners. The survey and sale of land, as well as migration arrangements and funding, were responsibilities of the resident commissioner. The first resident commissioner to be appointed was James Hurtle Fisher on 14 July 1836, but when George Gawler was appointed governor in 1838 to replace John Hindmarsh, he was given the role of resident commissioner as well, effective in October 1838.

=== Pacific Islands ===
The following territories had resident commissioners:

- The British Solomon Islands from 1893 until they got a governor (who also became the high commissioner) in 1952
- The Gilbert Islands and Ellice Islands were administered as a British protectorate by a resident commissioner from 1892 to 1916 and from 1916 to 1972 as part of the Gilbert and Ellice Islands Colony; from 1972, the colony had its own governor until the independence of Tuvalu (1978) and Kiribati (1979);
- The Cook Islands, since the 11 June 1901 incorporation into New Zealand (previously there was a British resident).
- Niue since 1901 (later under a high commissioner) soon annexed to the dominion of New Zealand (1901–1904 as part of the Cook Islands); see List of resident commissioners of Niue.
- A special case were the New Hebrides, for these were an Anglo-French colonial condominium, so he had a French colleague styled résident, subordinate to France's haut commissaire (high commissioner) in the Pacific Ocean (from 22 March 1907 the governor of New Caledonia); both were abolished at the independence of the Republic of Vanuatu in 1980.

=== Southern Africa ===
While the post of High Commissioner for Southern Africa (HCSA) was held 27 January 1847 - 31 May 1910 by the governors of the Cape Colony, then until 6 April 1931 by the governors-general of the Union of South Africa, after that date filled separately until 1963, there have been resident representatives in the constituent territories:

- In Bechuanaland Protectorate, after a few deputy and special commissioners, there were resident commissioners since it was made dependent on the HCSA on 9 May 1891; in 1892-1923 there were also two assistant commissioners, for the north and the south respectively.
- In the British Swaziland protectorate, since it was dependent on the HCSA in 1902 (before administered through Transvaal, under an administrator); afterward both got a separate commissioner.
- From 18 March 1884 Basutoland became a separate colony, as one of the High Commission Territories, it got its resident commissioner, instead of a Cape government agent (since it became a British protectorate in 1868).
- For Rhodesia, Michael Carver was designated in 1977 as the future resident commissioner, pending finalization of the internal settlement. Carver never assumed the role, resigning 14 months later in frustration over stalled negotiations.

== India ==
In India, a resident commissioner is the representative of the state government with an office in New Delhi, who is also supposed to manage the reception of state government functionaries who visit New Delhi. He coordinates with various ministries of the central government, central PSUs, multi-lateral and bilateral agencies and various other organisations on behalf of the state government. They are from Indian Administrative Service.

== United States ==
- The Resident Commissioner of Puerto Rico does not reside there but represents the U.S. commonwealth in the continental United States, particularly in the capital of Washington, D.C. The resident commissioner represents Puerto Rico in the United States House of Representatives, where they have a status equivalent to a territorial delegate, as well as before executive departments.
- In most other U.S. overseas (and historically pre-state) territories, a similar representative position is styled delegate.
- The Resident Commissioner of the Philippines held a similar position when the Philippines was a United States territory and then commonwealth. The position was originally created by the Philippine Organic Act of 1902 with the first commissioners serving from 1905. The position ended with Philippine Independence in 1946.
