= 1992 Niuean constitutional referendum =

13 June 1992

Results
Choice	Votes	%
Yes	604	70.40%
No	254	29.60%
Valid votes	858	96.30%
Invalid or blank votes	33	3.70%
Total votes	891	100.00%
Registered voters/turnout	1,036	86%

A constitutional referendum was held in Niue on 13 June 1992. The proposed amendments to the constitution were the first since the country's original constitution was approved in a 1974 referendum. The changes were approved by 70.4% of voters, and came into force on 1 July.

== Proposed changes ==
The changes to the constitution included the introduction of the Niuean High Court and Court of Appeal, replacing the use of the equivalent courts in New Zealand. The reforms also abolished the Niue Land Court and the Niue Land Appeal Court, instead creating a Land Division in the new High Court.

Qualifications for political candidates were amended to require New Zealand citizenship. It also removed article 31, a requirement for the Chief Justice to approve any legislative proposal that would affect criminal law or personal status. This effectively removed the human rights element of the constitution.

== Results ==
Choice	Votes	%
For	604	70.40
Against	254	29.60
Total	858	100.00
Valid votes	858	96.30
Invalid/blank votes	33	3.70
Total votes	891	100.00
Registered voters/turnout	1,036	86.00
Source: Niue: Review of Constitution

== Aftermath ==
Following the approval of the changes, there was subsequent criticism that the individual changes should have been voted on separately, as well as of the removal of article 31.
