= Halagigie Point =

Westernmost point of Niue

Coordinates: 19°04′30″S 169°56′59″W

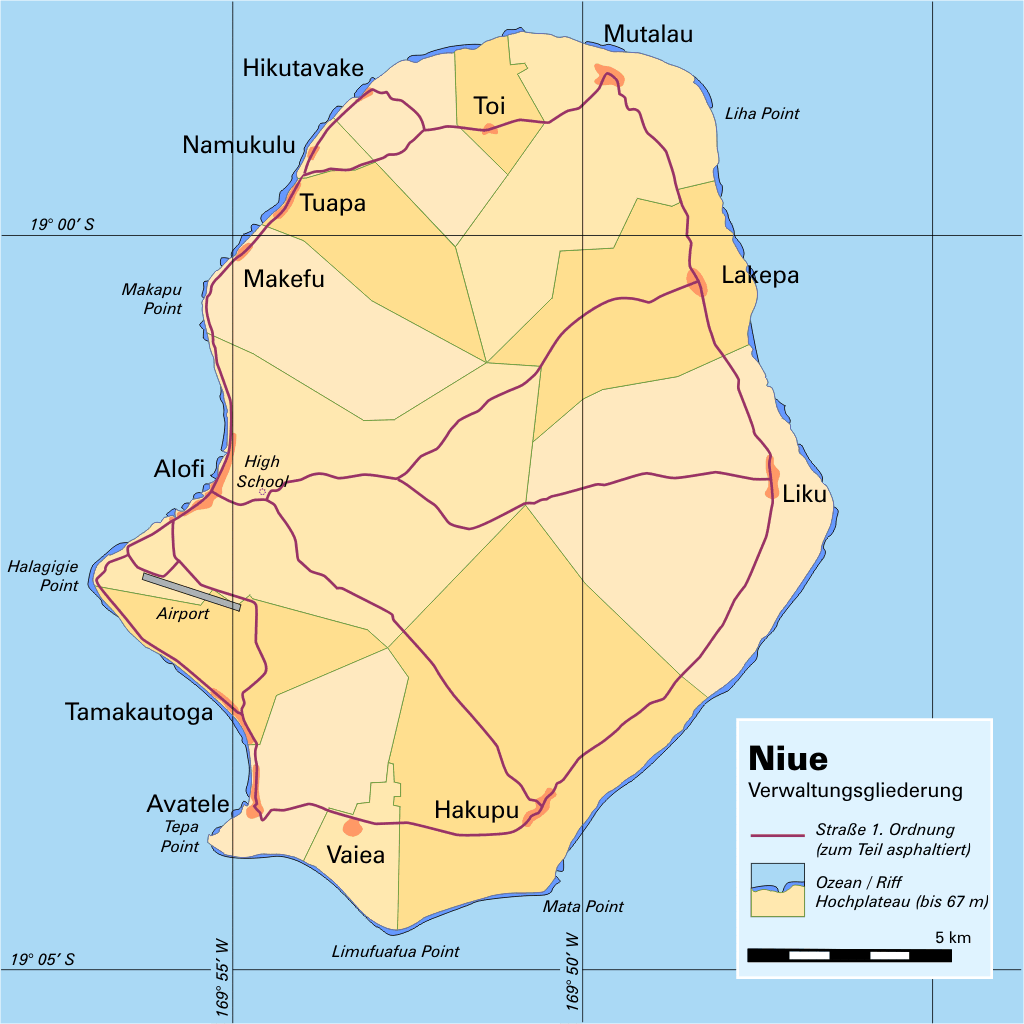
Halagigie Point is the westernmost point

Halagigie Point is the westernmost point on the island of Niue in Polynesia. It lies to the southwest of the capital, Alofi, between the two large bays of Alofi Bay (to the north) and Avatele Bay (to the south).
