= Bibliography of Niue =

Bibliography of an island country

The flag of Niue

Niue is a self-governing island country in free association with New Zealand. This bibliography compiles written and published works in the English language about Niue.

== Overviews ==
- Chisholm, Hugh, ed. (1911). "Niué" . Encyclopædia Britannica (11th ed.). Cambridge University Press.
- Foster, Sophie (2025) [1998]. "Niue". Encyclopedia Britannica (Online ed.).

== History ==
- Chapman, Terry (1976). The Decolonisation of Niue. New Zealand Institute of International Affairs (Thesis). Wellington: Victoria University Press. OCLC 3749817.
- Chapman, Terry; Etuata, Ikinepule; Hekau, Maihetoe; Kumitau, Vilisoni; Rex, Leslie; Tafatu, Ofa; Talagi, Fifita; Talagi, Tahafa Pope; Tanaki, Pitasoni; Tukuitoga, Ianeta Joylyn. Niue: A History of the Island. Institute of Pacific Studies. Suva, Fiji: University of the South Pacific. OCLC 25869602.
- Loeb, Edwin M. (1926). History and Traditions of Niue. Honolulu, Hawaii: Bernice P. Bishop Museum. OCLC 5251439.
- Pointer, Margaret; Folau, Kalaisi (2000). Tagi Tote e Loto Haaku, My Heart Is Crying a Little: Niue Island Involvement in the Great War, 1914–1918. Institute of Pacific Studies. Suva, Fiji: University of the South Pacific. ISBN 978-9-8202-0157-6.
- Pointer, Margaret (2015). Niue 1774–1974: 200 Years of Contact and Change. Honolulu: University of Hawaiʻi Press. ISBN 978-0-8248-5586-4.
- Pointer, Margaret (2018). Niue and the Great War. Dunedin, New Zealand: Otago University Press. ISBN 978-1-9885-3123-6.
- Smith, Stephenson Percy (1903). Niue-fekai (or Savage) Island and its People. Wellington: Whitcombe & Tombs. pp. 36–34.
- Thomson, Basil C. (1902). Savage Island . London: J. Murray – via Wikisource.
- Tregear, Edward (March 1893). "Niue: or Savage Island". The Journal of the Polynesian Society. 2: 11–16. Archived from the original on 26 June 2010.
- Walter, Richard K.; Anderson, Atholl (2002). The Archaeology of Niue Island, West Polynesia. Honolulu: Bishop Museum Press. ISBN 1-5817-8018-4.

== Geography and environment ==
- Hay, J. Rod; Powlesland, Ralph; Sim, Joanna (1998). Guide to Birds of Niue. Apia, Samoa: South Pacific Regional Environment Programme. ISBN 978-9-8204-0177-8.
- Sykes, W. R. (1970). Contributions to the Flora of Niue. ISBN 978-0-4770-1888-3. OCLC 128409.
- Terry, James P.; Murray, Warwick E. (2004). Niue Island: Geographical Perspectives on the Rock of Polynesia. International Scientific Council for Island Development. ISBN 9-2990-0230-4.

== Language ==
- Kaulima, Aiao; Beaumont, Clive H. (1994). A First Book for Learning Niuean. Auckland, New Zealand: Beaumont and Kaulima. ISBN 0-9583-3830-2.
- Kaulima, Aiao; Beaumont, Clive H. (2000). Learning Niuean, Book 2. Tohi Ako Vagahau Niue. Auckland, New Zealand: Beaumont and Kaulima. ISBN 0-9583-3839-6.
- Massam, Diane (2020). Niuean: Predicates and Arguments in an Isolating Language. Oxford University Press. ISBN 978-0-1987-9355-7.
- McEwen, J. M. (1970). Niue Dictionary. Wellington, New Zealand: Department of Maori and Island Affairs. OCLC 286538.
- Sperlich, Wolfgang B. (1997). Tohi Vagahau Niue/Niue Language Dictionary: Niuean-English, with English-Niuean Finderlist. Government of Niue. ISBN 978-0-8248-1933-0.
- Tregear, Edward; Smith, Stephenson Percy (1907). A Vocabulary and Grammar of the Niué Dialect of the Polynesian Language. Wellington, New Zealand: Government Printer. OCLC 771878844.
