= Niuean cuisine =

Culinary traditions of Niue

- Country or region: Niue
- National dish: Takihi
- National drink: Coconut water

Niue is an island in the Southern Pacific, mostly inhabited by Polynesians. The plantations are mostly filled with manioc, taro and breadfruit, but banana trees can be found. The wide range of exotic plants in Niue includes taros, pawpaw, coconuts, bananas, yams, cassavas and breadfruits: All are intensively used in the local cuisine.

The most significant ingredient when discussing the Niue's recipes are the fish and the vegetables. The staple ingredient is fish. Fish is consumed roasted, grilled, raw, and in soups or stews. There is a wide spectrum of edible and enjoyable fish species: tuna (ahi), dolphinfish (mahi mahi), parrot fish (pakati), barracuda (ono), coconut crabs and crayfish. In less populated areas, people prefer to eat vegetable meals, like taro roots or manioc.

== Dishes ==
- Nane Pia – A translucent porridge made from arrowroot and coconut, and has a thick slimy texture. The taste can be described as somewhat bland with a hint of coconut.
- 'Ota 'ika – A raw fish dish marinated in citrus juice and served in coconut milk.
- 'otai – A drink made from the meat and milk of a coconut. Unlike the well-known Tongan version, the Niuean version uses the cooked root of the ti plant instead of fruit.
- Pitako Pia – A traditional bread made from arrowroot and coconut milk.
- Takihi – A pudding made from layered pieces with taro and papaya and coconut cream.
- Vaihalo – A porridge made from arrowroot and coconut.

== Popular cuisine in Niue ==
An important event is the annual village show days, where people from the 14 villages gather to show their local cooking and culinary culture, for a great exchange of regional cuisines. A big umu (earth oven) is set for the tourists, who can try the delicacies from all of Niue's cuisines.

In the central town, Alofi, local markets take place two times every week. All the local fruits, vegetables, fish and seafood can be found there. Among the most popular items from the market are uga, taro, yams, cassava and breadfruit. Even though these tropical plants can be found all over the region, there are a few differences between the central town Alofi and the villages.

In Alofi, Polynesian and European food can be found in the restaurants, besides the traditional Niue ones. In the villages, people usually consume only the local plants and fish; the food is mostly homemade, using the earth ovens.

== Preparation methods for Niuean cooking ==
The visual attractiveness of the dish is important, and a balance between colours and proportion differentiates. Each traditional dish has a special cooking method, which is more or less general in all of Niue's regions. Meat is one of the main elements of most Niue dishes, and cured and smoked hams are often included. Niue cuisine uses elements from cooking traditions borrowed from their neighbours and developed from their own traditional dishes.
