= List of resident commissioners of Niue =

The following is a list of resident commissioners of Niue from its annexation by New Zealand in 1901 to its independence as a self-governing nation in free association with New Zealand in October 1974. Since that date, the representative of New Zealand in Niue has been the High Commissioner of New Zealand to Niue.

== List of colonial heads of Niue ==
Tenure	Incumbent	Title
Last quarter 1900	Percy Smith	Government Agent
1902–1903	Christopher Freke Maxwell	Resident Agent
1903–1907	Christopher Freke Maxwell	Resident Commissioner
1907–1917	Henry Greyshott Cornwall	Resident Commissioner
1918–1921	Guy Norman Morris	Resident Commissioner
1921–1922	John Crouchley Murray Evison	Resident Commissioner
1922–1925	Guy Norman Morris	Resident Commissioner
1925–1931	Col. Arthur Albert Luckham	Resident Commissioner
1931–1942	Capt William Moody Bell	Resident Commissioner
1942–1943	Joseph Patrick McMahon-Box	Resident Commissioner
1943–1953	Cecil Hector Watson Larsen	Resident Commissioner
1953–1956	Jock Malcolm McEwen	Resident Commissioner
1956–1958	Albert Oliver Dare	Resident Commissioner
1958–1962	David Walter Reginald Heatley	Resident Commissioner
1962–1968	Lyle Allen Shanks	Resident Commissioner
1968–1973	Selwyn Digby Wilson	Resident Commissioner
1973–1974	Clifford Andrew Roberts	Resident Commissioner

== See also ==
- History of Niue
