= Takalo =

Niuean war dance

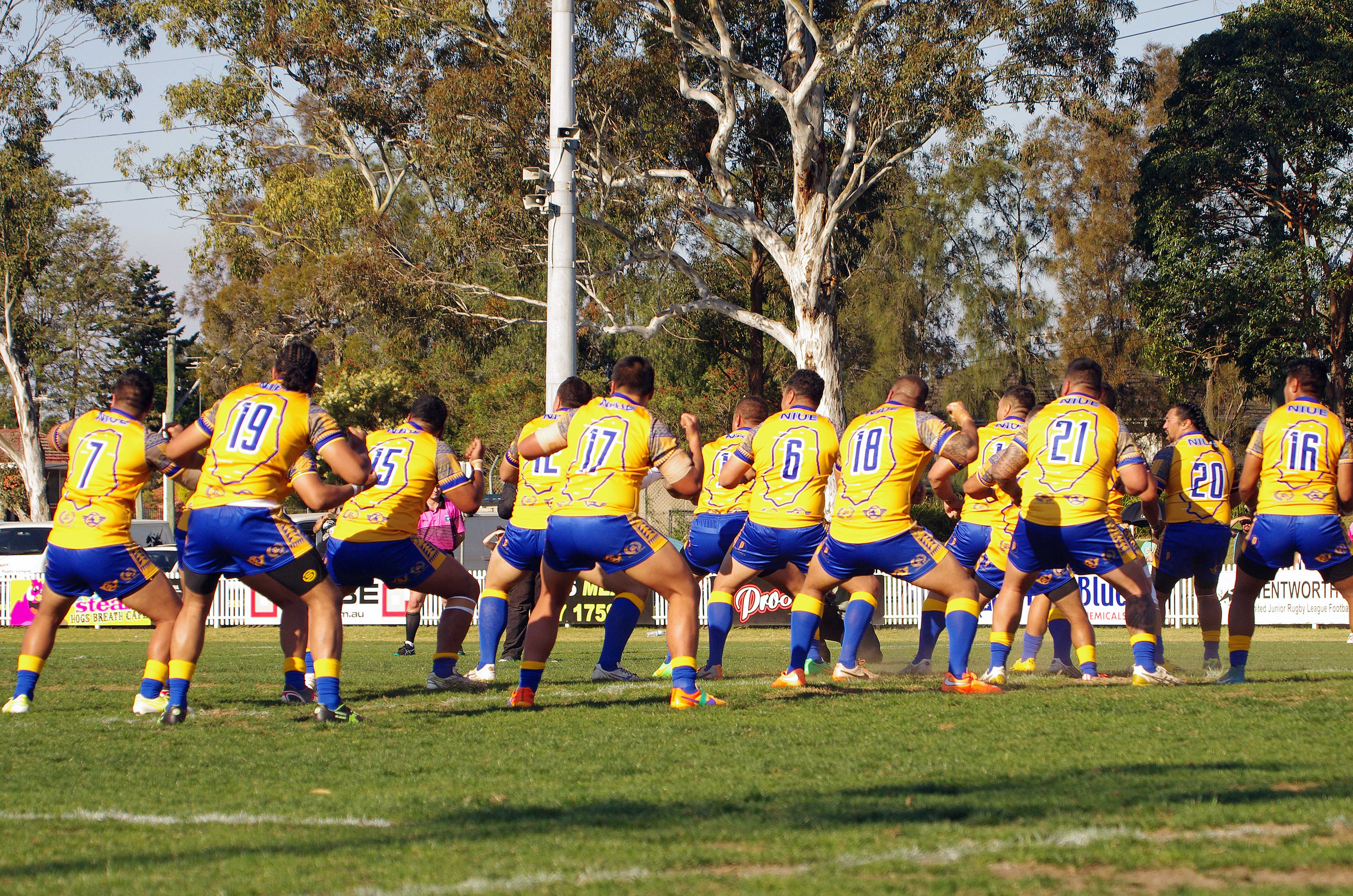
- Niue national rugby league team performing Takalo before one of their test matches
- Genre: War dance
- Origin: Niue

The takalo is a Niuean war dance. Performed by an individual warrior or group of warriors, the dance is a formal challenge, and was traditionally performed prior to engaging the enemy with traditional war clubs.

In modern times, the takalo is often performed prior to a rugby game or winning a game of some sport code. The takalo is also performed to welcome dignitaries upon arrival into Niue, and signifies that the dignitaries' arrival is for the purpose of peace and harmony.

== See also ==
- Haka
