= Takihi =

Culinary dish

- Type: Casserole, Vegan, Vegetarian
- Course: Main Course
- Place of origin: Niue
- Region or state: Niue
- Associated cuisine: Ika Mata, Fresh Fish
- Serving temperature: Cooled
- Main ingredients: Taro, Papaya, Coconut Cream
- Variations: Pawpaw, Sweet Potato, Onion, Tapioca, Shredded Coconut

Takihi is considered the national dish of Niue. This Niuean dish is traditionally made from thinly sliced taro and papaya, layered and dressed with coconut cream and baked in a type of underground oven called an Umu. Other variations of the dish can involve onion, pawpaw, tapioca, sweet potato (sometimes referred to as 'kūmara'), and shaved coconut. Its flavor is often described as "creamy, sweet, and savory". It is credited as being unique to Niue. It is popularly eaten with Niuean raw fish, or more generally with seafood.

Takihi is a straightforward dish. First, the ingredients must be prepared. This involves peeling, slicing, and deseeding the respective fruits and tubers. About 50mm, or half a centimeter, is the recommended thickness. Traditionally Takihi would be made in an Umu, a style of earthen oven that the Niue people have long employed for cooking. The creation of the Umu would involve digging a pit in the ground, in which stones are placed and heated to the desired temperature. Food is wrapped in leaves, and these wrapped parcels are placed on the hot stones. The food and stones are then covered in leaves and soil, trapping the heat underground and forming an oven in which the food cooks. However, this isn't the only way to cook Takihi, as a lot of recipes available online nowadays use a modern electric oven. There are recipes where the sliced ingredients are layered and then compressed and covered with a coconut milk and water mixture, and there are recipes in which the coconut milk and water are layered into the dish rather than poured on top. However, the final layer on all versions is coconut milk. The contemporary Takihi is made in a large baking dish or oven tray, lined with tin foil or tray liners to help the dish keep its shape and ease its removal from the cooking vessel. It is also covered with tin foil before going into the oven. The dish is typically cooked for about an hour and a half on 180 °C - 200 °C, or until it is fork tender. Some Niuean locals will top their Takihi with shredded coconut. It is served in slices, like a sheet cake or lasagna.
