= Niue Constitution Act =

Fundamental law of Niue

Niue Constitution Act 1974

New Zealand Parliament
- Long title: An Act to make provision for self-government by the people of Niue, and to provide a constitution for Niue.
- Royal assent: 29 August 1974
- Commenced: 19 October 1974
- Status: Current legislation

The Schedules of the Niue Constitution Act 1974 form the Constitution of Niue. It stipulates the make-up of the executive branch of the government, the legislative branch, and the judicial branch. The Niue Constitution Act 1974 is the supreme law of Niue; any other Niue law that is inconsistent with the Niue Constitution Act 1974 will be deemed to be invalid.

Its granting by the New Zealand Parliament in 1974 is celebrated yearly as Niue's independence on "Constitution Day" on 19 October. The road towards self-government for Niue started with the UN Decolonisation Committee putting pressure on New Zealand for Niue to decide what form of status Niue wanted. The people of Niue voted in 1974 choosing the self-government option as the best direction for Niue. The Niue Constitution is the legal doctrine that put the wishes of the Niue people for self-government into practice. Self-government allows for Niueans to lead and take charge of their own affairs; this has reduced the number of New Zealand expats working in key Government positions from around 20 in 1974 to none at the moment.

Amendments require a two-thirds majority vote in favour in the second and third readings of the respective constitutional amendment bills in the Assembly, followed by approval by a referendum; amendments to articles 1 (executive authority being vested in the Crown), 35(1)(b)(i) (requirements to amend the constitution) and 69 (appointments to Niue Public Service) require two-thirds of the valid vote in favour in the referendum to be approved, while amendments to other articles require only a majority of the valid referendum vote in favour.

== See also ==
- 1992 Niuean constitutional referendum
- 2024 Niuean constitutional referendum
