= Tuanaki =

Islets once part of the Cook Islands

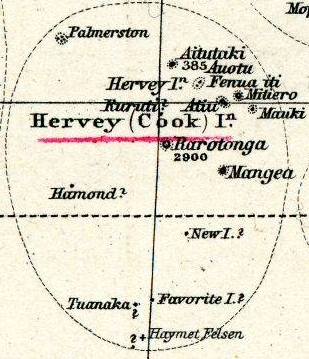

Tuanaki or Tuanahe is the name of an anecdotal vanished group of islets, once part of the Cook Islands. It was located south of Rarotonga and within two days sail of Mangaia.

In 1916, the Polynesian Society of Honolulu reprinted an account by a sailor who had visited there in 1842, spending six days among the natives. However this account added that two years later in 1844, a schooner of English missionaries had found nothing. Some Tuanakians who had emigrated to Rarotonga allegedly survived.

The 1916 publication re-ignited interest in the flyaway islands, and explorer Sir Ernest Shackleton, when planning the Shackleton–Rowett Expedition of 1921–1922, proclaimed as one of his goals the rediscovery of Tuanaki. The explorer died in Antarctic waters before he was able to mount a serious search for the vanished archipelago.

It was suggested in 1952 that the Haymet Rocks were a remnant of Tuanaki. However, the existence of the Haymet Rocks at some point is unconfirmed as well.

== Tuanaki in art ==
The band Beirut titled one of the songs from their seventh album, A Study of Losses, released in 2025, in reference to Tuanaki Island, Tuanaki Atoll.
