= Avatele Bay =

Bay in Niue

Coordinates: 19°07′10″S 169°55′06″W

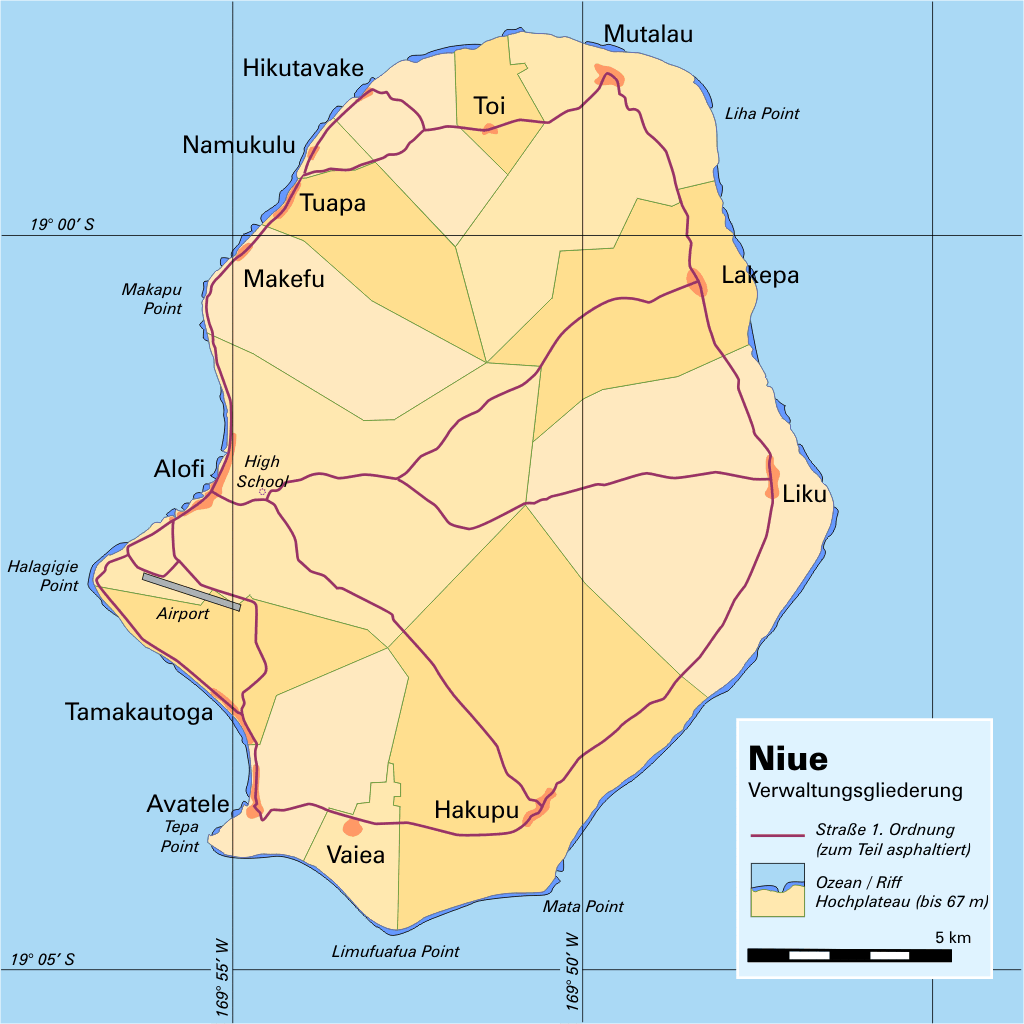
Avatele Bay is in the southwest

Avatele Bay is a large bay in the southwest coast of Niue. It stretches from Tepa Point in the island's extreme southwest northwards to Halagigie Point, the island's westernmost extremity. Two small settlements, Tamakautoga and Avatele lie close to the shore of the bay.
