= Jock McEwen (public servant) =

New Zealand public servant, writer and carver

Jock Malcolm McEwen CMG (1915–2010) was a New Zealand public servant, writer and carver who contributed to Māori development. He led the carving by students at Rimutaka Prison of the Māori carved pou (posts) that stand in the foyer of the Michael Fowler Centre, Wellington. He helped found Orongomai Marae, Upper Hutt, and worked on the sixth edition of Herbert Williams' A Dictionary of the Maori Language, regarded for many years as the standard dictionary of the Māori language.

== Early life and education ==
McEwen was born in Feilding on the 17th of February 1915 and was Pākehā of Scottish Highlander descent. His father Malcolm McEwen was the headmaster at Taonui School. McEwen attended this school and learnt Māori while he was there from being around other speakers. He was supported in his language acquisition by visits to Aorangi Marae where the elders there would correct him. These people included Mason Durie (Meihana Te Rama-Apakura) and his wife Kahurautete.

McEwen went to secondary school in Palmerston North. He obtained a law degree from Victoria University of Wellington.

== Career and community work ==
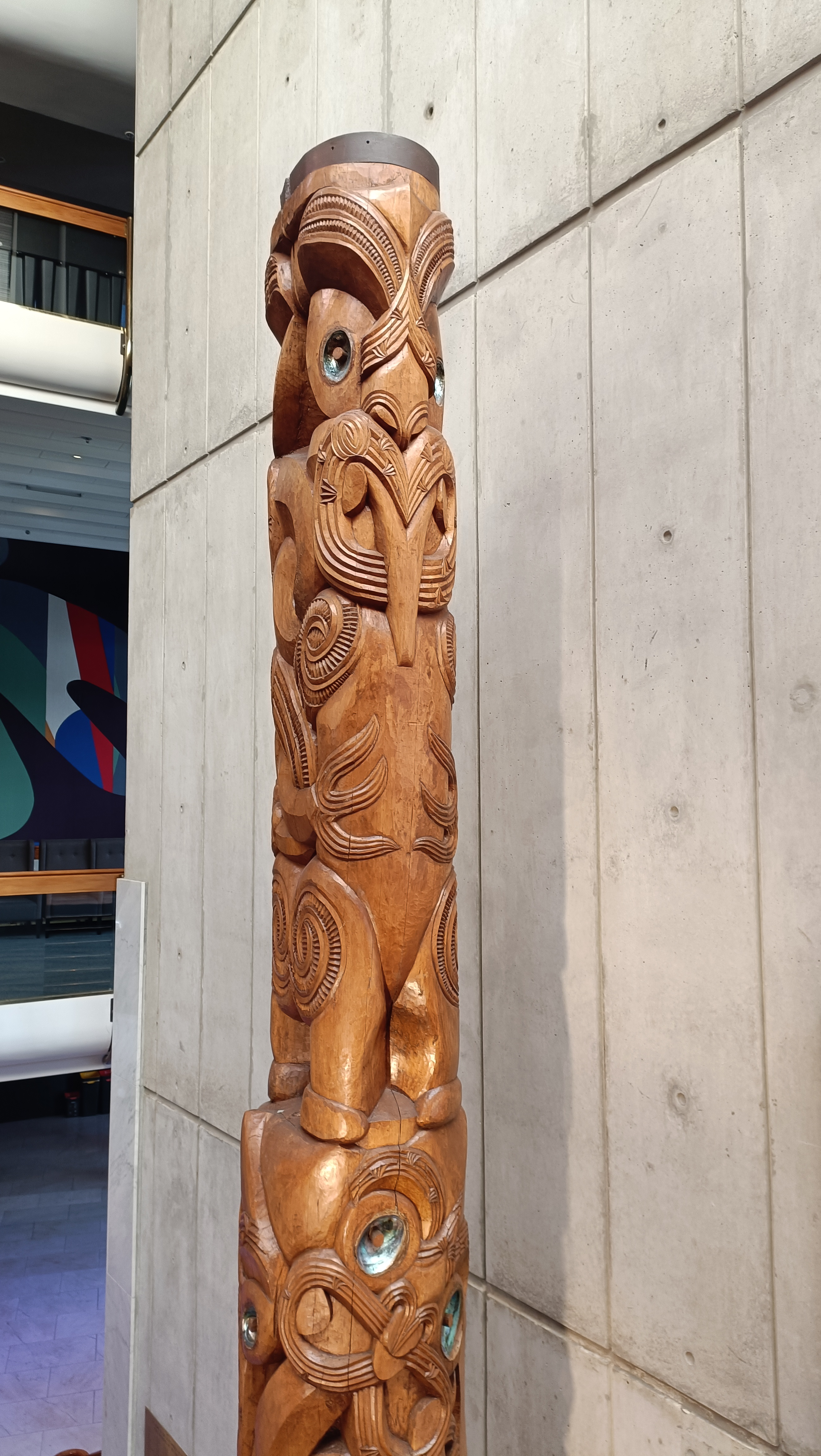
Pou at the Michael Fowler Centre

In 1935 McEwen obtained a job at the Native Affairs Department as part of the New Zealand public service. Āpirana Ngata was also working there.

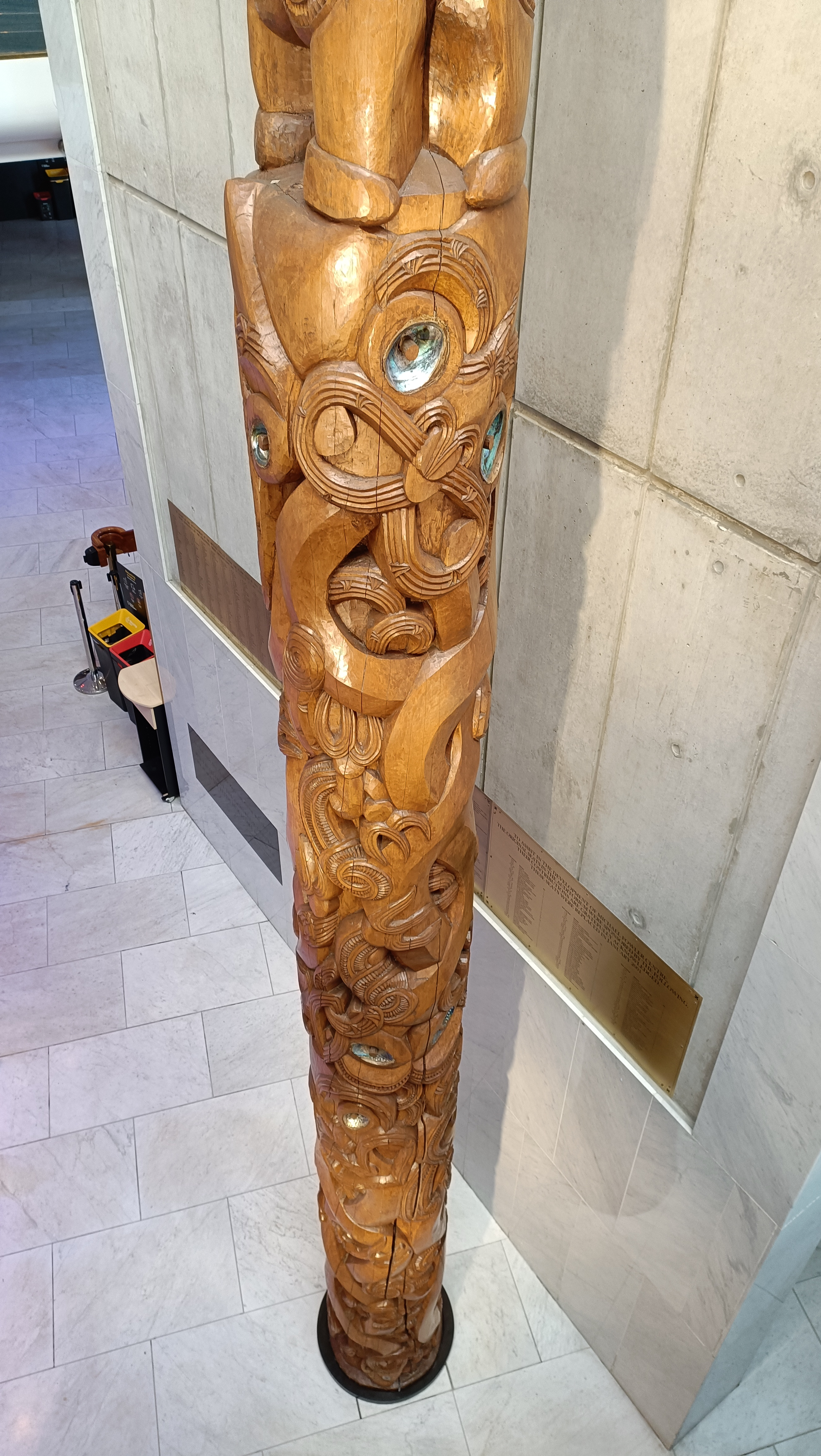
(bottom) Pou at the Michael Fowler Centre

McEwen was part of the founding of the Ngati Poneke in 1937, an urban pan-tribal cultural club. He was on the Polynesian Society Council from the 1940s and the president for 21 years. He was a founding member of Orongomai Marae in Upper Hutt.

In the early 1950s McEwen was posted to Niue as the Resident Commissioner where he learnt the language and wrote the first dictionary. McEwen was the Secretary of Māori and Island Affairs from 1963 until 1975. As a writer and linguist he was part of revising the Standard Maori Dictionary, sixth edition.

McEwen and others taught carving inside Remutaka Prison with prisoners where they created the two pou (carved posts) for the foyer of the Michael Fowler Centre. Artist Wi Taepa who was a prison officer at the prison also participated, as well as Ralph Love.

== Legacy and death ==
When McEwen retired in 1975 he had a tokotoko (carved staff) presented to him by the Māori Queen.

After living in Silverstream, Upper Hutt for over 50 years McEwen died in Wellington on 10 May 2010. Before his burial he lay in state wearing the cloak of a kaumatua in Orongomai Marae.

Politician Matiu Rata said of McEwen:

If every area had a Jock McEwen, what a great country New Zealand would be. (Matiu Rata)
