= Haymet Rocks =

Phantom island

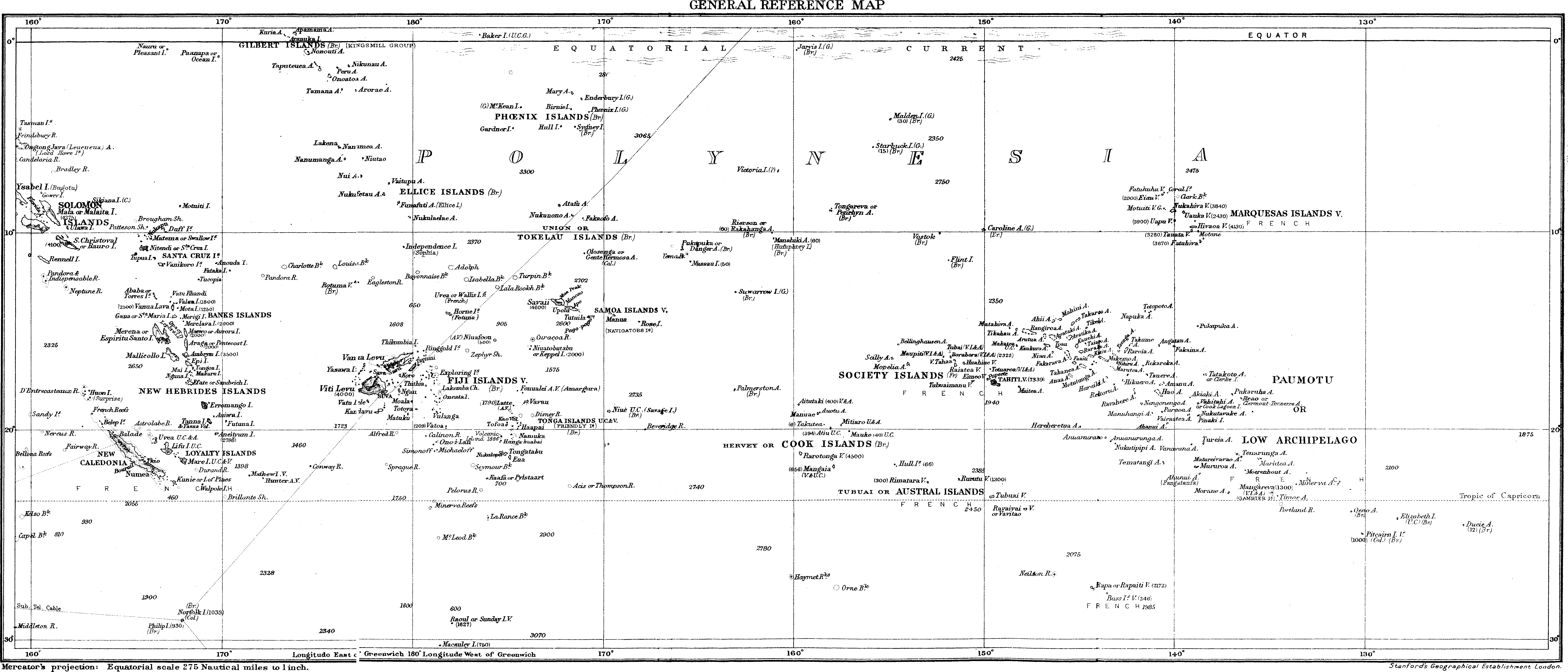
1924 map of Central Polynesia, with Haymet R^{ks} and Orne B^{k} (lower part, in the middle)

The Haymet Rocks were reported by J.E. Haymet, master and owner of the cutter Will Watch, when on passage between Auckland and Rarotonga; in 1863 the cutter passed between two rocks and struck on the northern of the two, damaging her false keel. The rocks are said to extend over a space of about a quarter of a mile, to have been distinctly seen, and with apparently 7 or 8 feet (2.1 or 2.4 m) of water over them. Haymet gave their position as 27°11′S 160°13′W, which would place them about 135 miles (217 km) west of the position assigned to Orne Bank.

These rocks were unsuccessfully searched for, in the position given, by HMS Satellite in 1886, and again by the French Government vessel Fabert in 1887; the latter vessel spent three days in the search under favourable circumstances of wind and weather, running over some 253 miles (407 km) within a radius of from 20 to 25 miles (32 to 40 km) of the position assigned, and with no result. A depth of 68 fathoms (124 m) to the rocky ocean floor was found by the Fabert at 24°7′S 158°33′W.

In December 1882, however, a Lloyd's agent at Rarotonga reported that the Haymet rocks were supposed to exist about 150 miles (240 km) SSW of Rarotonga, and therefore right in the track of vessels bound from Auckland to that island, who always give this supposed position a wide berth. If this information is correct, these rocks are about 240 miles (390 km) NNW of the position as given by Haymet and still shown on the charts.

It was suggested that the Haymet Rocks were a remnant of sunken island Tuanaki.

== Notes ==
This article incorporates text from Pacific Islands, v. 3, a publication from 1900, now in the public domain in the United States.
