= 1974 Niuean constitutional referendum =

- 3 September 1974
- Do you vote for self-government for Niue in free association with New Zealand on the basis of the Constitution and the Niue Constitution Act 1974 ?

Results
Choice	Votes	%
Yes	887	65.41%
No	469	34.59%
Valid votes	1,356	97.98%
Invalid or blank votes	28	2.02%
Total votes	1,384	100.00%

A constitutional referendum was held in Niue on 3 September 1974. The constitution was approved by 65% of voters, and came into force on 19 October.

== Background ==
The proposed constitution was drafted by Robert Quentin Quentin-Baxter, a Professor of Constitutional Law and Jurisprudence at Victoria University of Wellington, in consultation with the Niue Assembly. The new constitution would make Niue an autonomous region under the sovereignty of New Zealand; islanders would gain New Zealand citizenship and be able to settle freely in New Zealand. It provided for a 21-member Assembly, consisting of a Speaker and 20 elected members (14 elected from single-member constituencies based on the villages and six from a single island-wide constituency). The Assembly would elected a Premier, who would choose three other members of a four-person Executive Council.

The referendum was approved by the Niue Assembly on 16 July 1974, and the proposed constitution was approved in the New Zealand Parliament through the Niue Amendment Bill and the Niue Constitution Act.

== Results ==
Do you vote for self-government for Niue in free association with New Zealand on the basis of the Constitution and the Niue Constitution Act 1974?

Choice	Votes	%
For	887	65.41
Against	469	34.59
Total	1,356	100.00
Valid votes	1,356	97.98
Invalid/blank votes	28	2.02
Total votes	1,384	100.00
Source: Direct Democracy
