= Niue =

Country in the South Pacific Ocean

Niue Niuē (Niuean)
- Flag Coat of arms
- Motto: Atua, Niue Tukulagi (Niuean) "God, Niue Eternally"
- Anthem: Ko e Iki he Lagi (Niuean) "The Lord in Heaven" Royal anthem: "God Save the King"

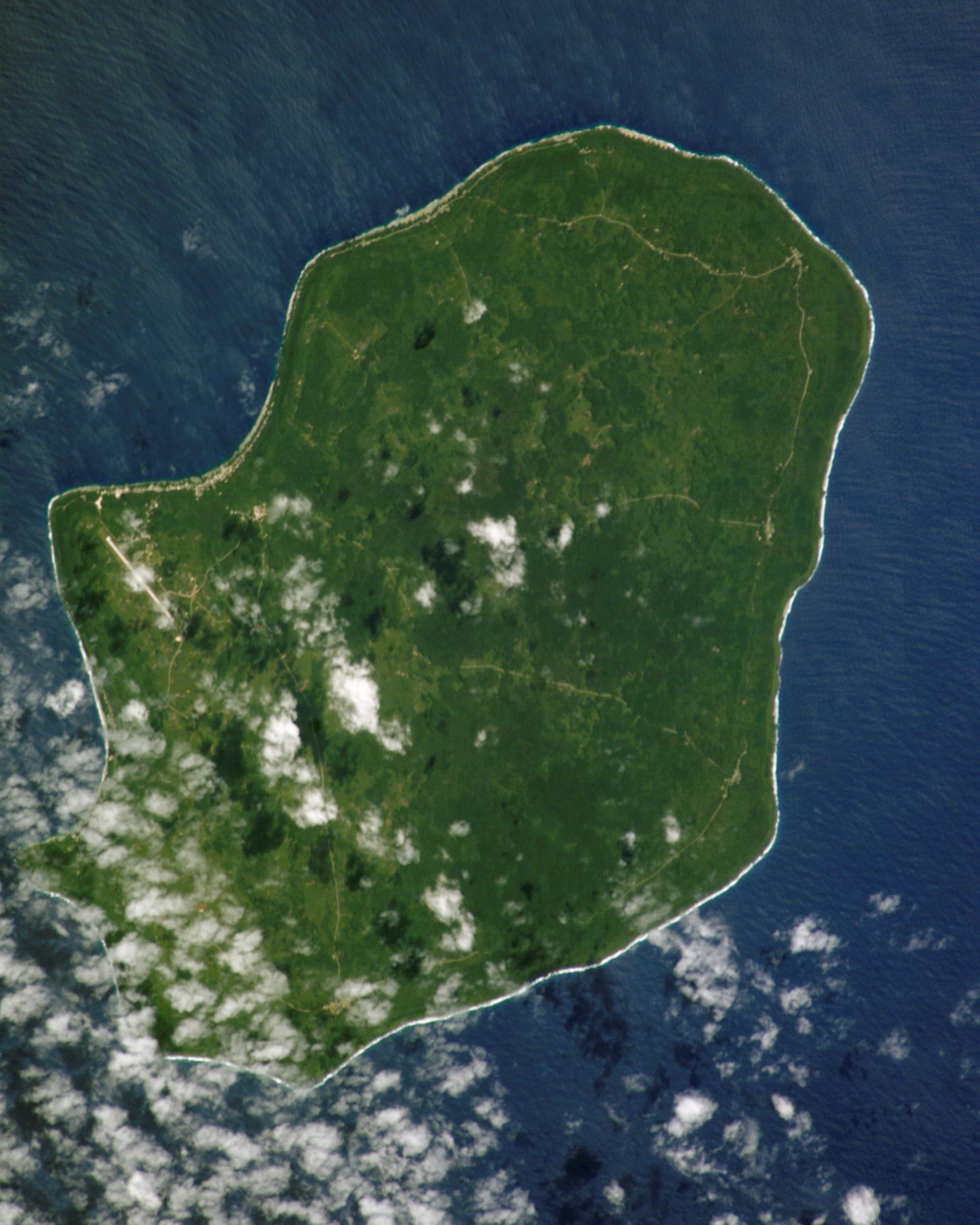
- Satellite image of Niue
- Capital and largest village: Alofi; 19°03′14″S 169°55′12″W
- Official languages: Niuean; English
- Ethnic groups: 68.4% Niuean; 5.3% Part-Niuean; 29.3% Other
- Demonym: Niuean
- Government: Unitary non-partisan parliamentary constitutional monarchy
  - Monarch: Charles III
  - Governor-General (Note: The King in right of New Zealand is represented by the Governor-General of New Zealand in relation to Niue.): Dame Cindy Kiro
  - Prime Minister (Note: The Prime Minister is still referred to as the "Premier of Niue" in most governmental pages and entities, and retains the title Premier as an alternate, transitional, or quasi-official name despite the recent referendum.): Dalton Tagelagi
- Legislature: Niue Assembly

Associated state of New Zealand
  - Self-government in free association with New Zealand: 19 October 1974
  - Independence in foreign relations recognised by the UN: 1994

Area
  - Total: 261.46 km^{2} (100.95 sq mi)
  - Water (%): negligible

Population
  - 2021 estimate: 1,937 (not ranked)
  - 2022 census: 1,681
  - Density: 6.71/km^{2} (17.4/sq mi) (not ranked)
- GDP (PPP): 2021 estimate
  - Total: $18.7 million (220th)
  - Per capita: $11,100 (140th)
- GDP (nominal): 2025 estimate
  - Total: ▲US$28.9 million
- Currency: New Zealand dollar (Note: The Niue dollar, pegged with the New Zealand dollar at par, is also official legal tender, although is mainly used for issuing collector's coins and does not circulate widely.) (NZD)
- Time zone: UTC−11
- Calling code: +683
- ISO 3166 code: NU
- Internet TLD: .nu

Niue (Note: UK: /ˈnjuː.eɪ/ NYOO-ay, US: /niː.ˈjuː.eɪ/ nee-YOO-ay; Niuean: Niuē) is a self-governing island country in the South Pacific Ocean, in Polynesia, part of Oceania. Like the neighbouring Cook Islands, it is in free association with New Zealand. Its population is predominantly Polynesian. As one of the world's largest coral islands, Niue is nicknamed "The Rock", which comes from the traditional name "Rock of Polynesia".

Niue's position is inside a triangle drawn between Tonga, Samoa, and the Cook Islands. It is 2,400 kilometres (1,500 mi) northeast of New Zealand, and 604 kilometres (375 mi) northeast of Tonga. Niue's land area is about 261.46 square kilometres (100.95 mi^{2}) and its population was 1,689 at the Census in 2022.

The terrain of the island has two noticeable levels. The higher level is made up of a limestone cliff running along the coast, with a plateau in the centre of the island reaching approximately 60 metres (200 ft) above sea level. The lower level is a coastal terrace approximately 500 metres (1,600 ft) wide and about 25–27 metres (80–90 feet) high, which slopes down and meets the sea in small cliffs. A coral reef surrounds the island; the only major break in the reef is in the central western coast, close to the capital, Alofi.

Niue is subdivided into 14 villages (municipalities). Each village has a council that elects its chairperson; they are also electoral districts, and each sends an assemblyperson to the Niue Assembly (parliament).

Since Niue is part of the Realm of New Zealand, most diplomatic relations on behalf of Niue are conducted by New Zealand. Niueans are citizens of New Zealand, and Charles III is Niue's head of state in his capacity as King of New Zealand.

As of 2006, between 90% and 95% of Niuean people live in New Zealand, along with about 70% of the speakers of the Niuean language. Niue is a bilingual country: 30% of the population speak both Niuean and English; 11% speak only English; and 46% speak only Niuean.

Niue is a parliamentary democracy; legislative elections are held every three years. Niue is not a member of the United Nations (UN); however, UN organisations accept its status as a freely associated state, equivalent to an independent state for the purposes of international law. As such, Niue is a member of some UN specialised agencies (such as UNESCO and the WHO), and is invited, along with the other non-UN member state, the Cook Islands, to attend United Nations conferences open to "all states". Niue has been a member of the Pacific Community since 1980.

== History ==
Archaeological evidence suggests that Polynesians from Samoa settled on Niue around 900 CE. Further settlers arrived from Tonga in the form of a war party in the 16th century, according to Niuean tradition.

Until the beginning of the 18th century, Niue appeared to have had no national government or single leader; chiefs and heads of families exercised authority over segments of the population. A succession of patu-iki (kings) ruled, beginning with Puni-mata. Tui-toga, who reigned from 1875 to 1887, was the first of the country's kings to adopt Christianity.

The first Europeans to sight Niue sailed under Captain James Cook in 1774. Cook made three attempts to land, but the inhabitants refused to grant permission to do so. He named the island "Savage Island" because, as legend has it, the natives who "greeted" him were painted in what appeared to be blood. The red substance was actually hulahula, a native red fe'i banana. For the next couple of centuries, Niue was known as "Savage Island" until its original name, "Niue", which translates as "behold the coconut", regained use.

Whaling vessels were some of the most regular visitors to the island in the nineteenth century. The first on record was the Fanny in February 1824. The last known whaler to visit was the Albatross in November 1899.

=== Christian missionary activity ===
The next documented European visitors represented the London Missionary Society, who arrived on the Messenger of Peace. After many years of trying to land a European missionary, they abducted a Niuean named Nukai Peniamina and trained him as a pastor at the Malua Theological College in Samoa.

Peniamina returned in 1846 on the John Williams as a missionary with the help of Toimata Fakafitifonua. He was finally allowed to land in Uluvehi Mutalau after a number of attempts in other villages had failed. The chiefs of Mutalau village allowed him to land and protected him day and night at the fort in Fupiu.

Christianity was first taught to the people of Mutalau before it spread to all the villages. Originally other major villages opposed the introduction of Christianity and had sought to kill Peniamina. The people from the village of Hakupu, although the last village to receive Christianity, came and asked for a "word of God"; hence, their village was renamed "Ha Kupu Atua" meaning "any word of God", or "Hakupu" for short.

In July 1849, Captain John Erskine visited the island in HMS Havannah.

=== Request for colony status ===
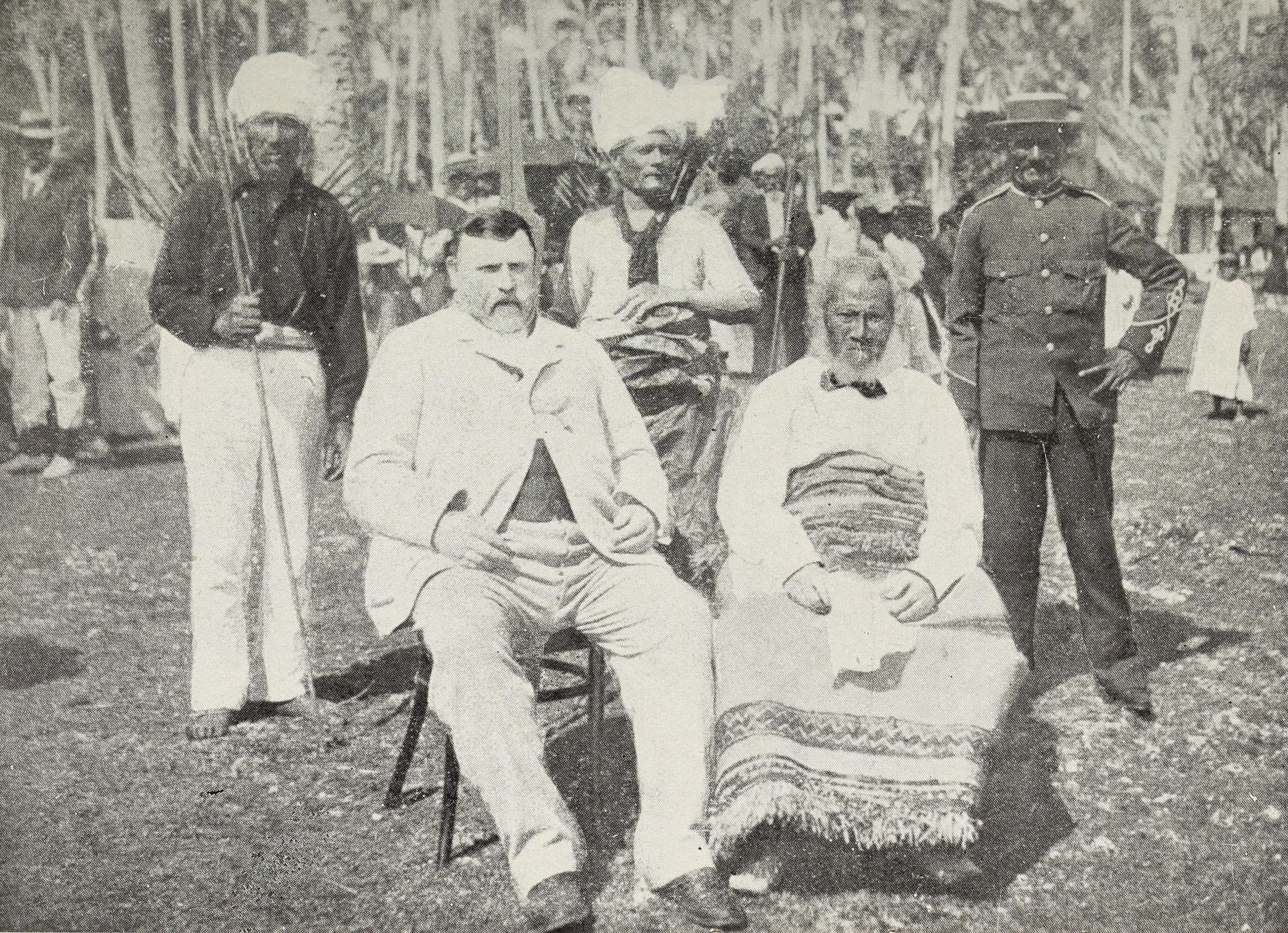
Prime Minister of New Zealand Richard Seddon and the Patu-iki (King) of Niue, Togia-Pulu-toaki, c. 1900.

In 1889, the chiefs and rulers of Niue, in a letter to Queen Victoria, asked her "to stretch out towards us your mighty hand, that Niue may hide herself in it and be safe". After expressing anxiety lest some other nation should take possession of the island, the letter continued: "We leave it with you to do as seems best to you. If you send the flag of Britain that is well; or if you send a Commissioner to reside among us, that will be well". The British did not initially take up the offer. In 1900 a petition by the Cook Islanders asking for annexation included Niue "if possible".

In a document dated 19 October 1900, the King and Chiefs of Niue consented to "Queen Victoria taking possession of this island". A despatch to the Secretary of State for the Colonies from the Governor of New Zealand referred to the views expressed by the Chiefs in favour of "annexation" and to this document as "the deed of cession". A British Protectorate was declared, but it remained short-lived. Niue was brought within the boundaries of New Zealand on 11 June 1901 by the same Order and Proclamation as the Cook Islands. The Order limited the islands to which it related by reference to an area in the Pacific described by coordinates, and Niue, at 19.02 S., 169.55 W, lies within that area.

=== Modern period ===
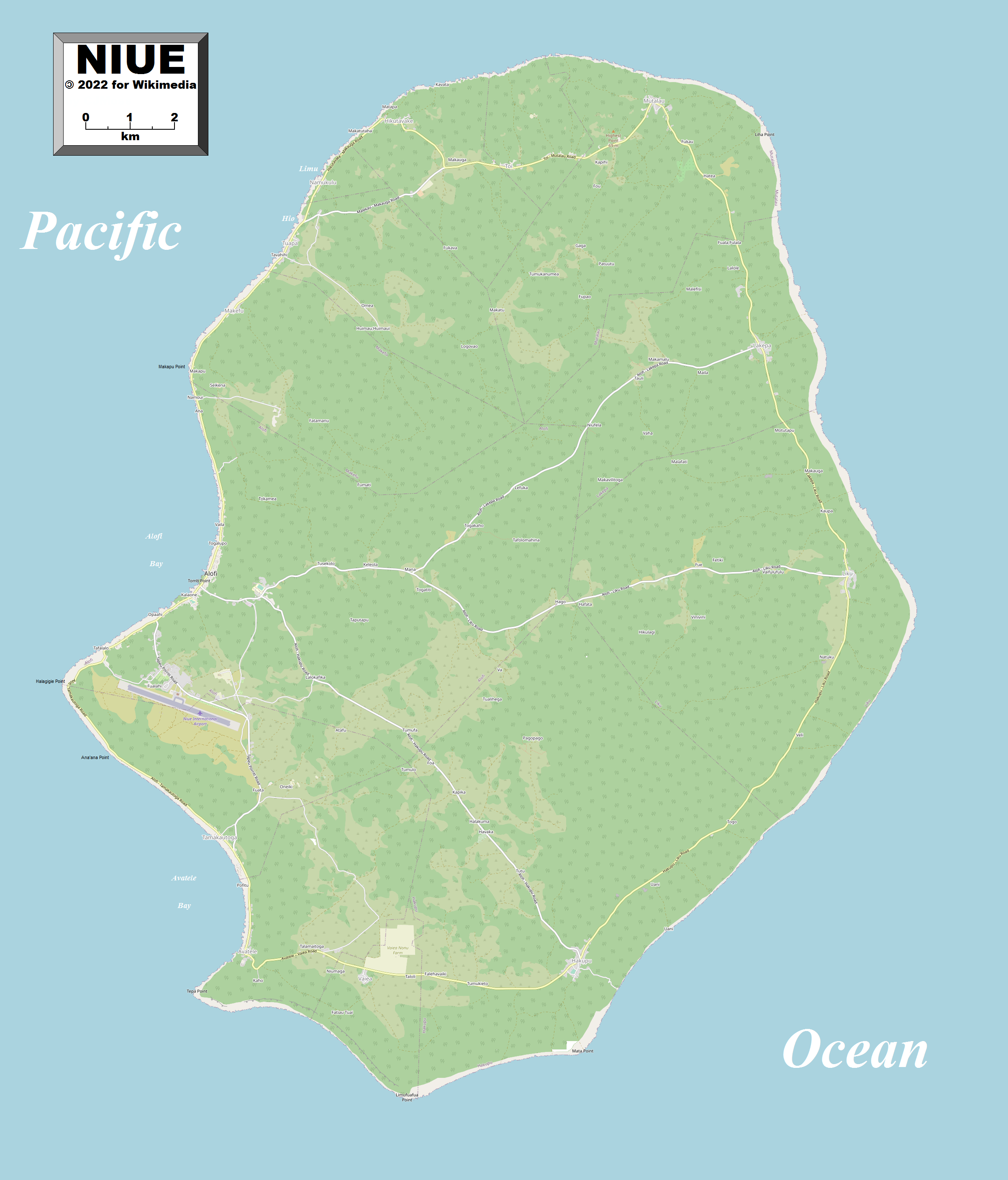
Detailed map of Niue

Niue International Airport was established in 1970 and opened to commercial flight passengers in November 1971.

The New Zealand Parliament restored self-government in Niue with the 1974 Niue Constitution Act, following the 1974 Niuean constitutional referendum in which Niueans had three options: independence, self-government, or continuation as a New Zealand territory. The majority selected self-government, and Niue's written constitution was promulgated as supreme law. Robert Rex was elected by the Niue Assembly as the first Premier of Niue in 1974, a position he held until his death 18 years later. In 1984, Rex became the first Niuean to receive a knighthood.

In January 2004, Cyclone Heta hit Niue, killing one person and causing extensive damage to the entire island, including wiping out most of the south of the capital, Alofi.

On 7 March 2020, the International Dark-Sky Association announced that Niue had become the first entire country to be designated an International Dark Sky Sanctuary. On 29 September 2022, President Joe Biden announced that the United States would recognise Niue as a sovereign nation. On 25 September 2023, recognition was declared by President Biden and diplomatic relations were established.

== Geography ==
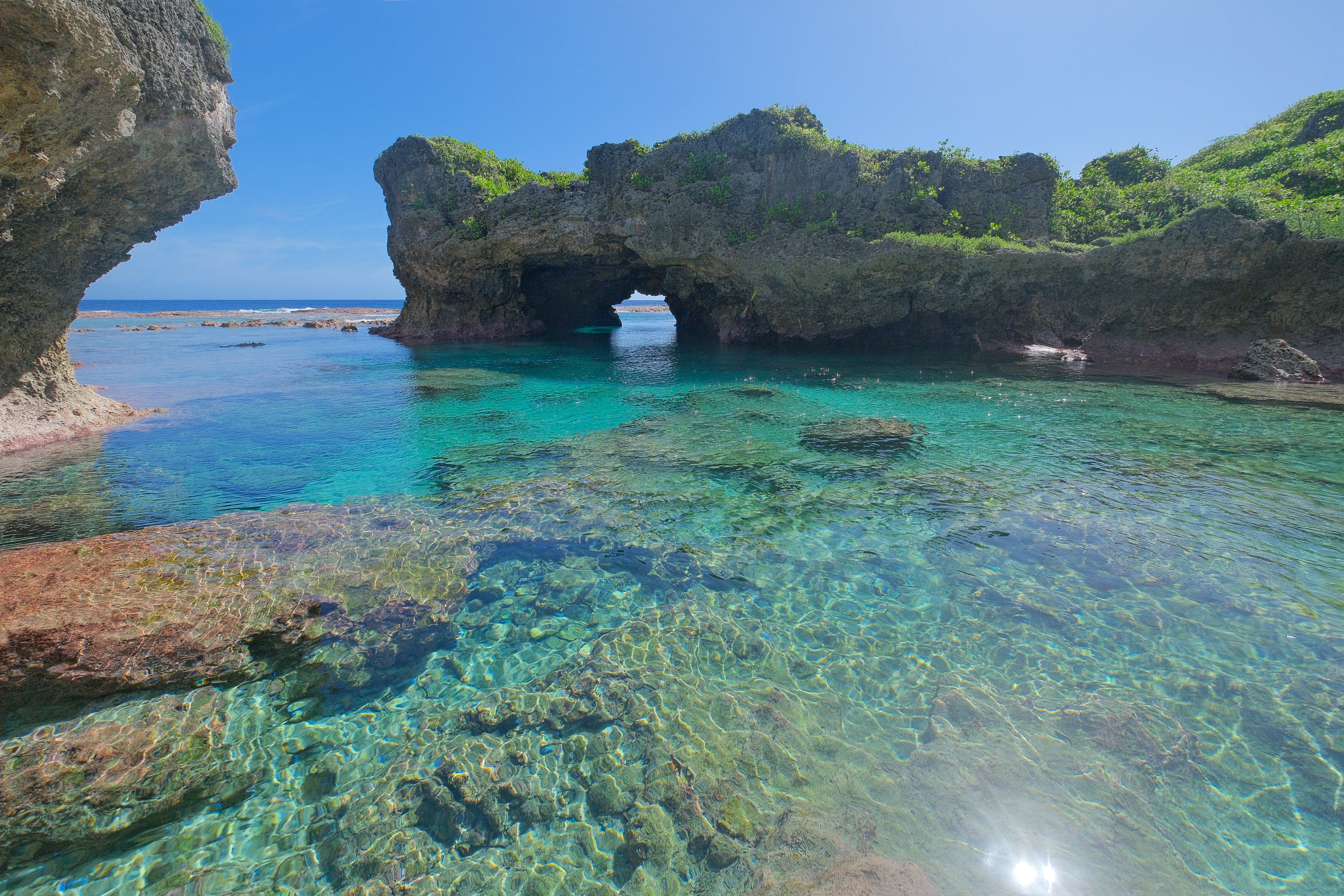
Natural stone arch at the Limu Pools along the coast of Niue

Niue is a 261.46 km^{2} (100.95 sq mi) raised coral atoll in the southern Pacific Ocean, east of Tonga. There are three outlying coral reefs within the exclusive economic zone, with no land area:

1. Beveridge Reef, 240 km (150 mi) southeast (20°00′S 167°48′W), a submerged atoll drying during low tide, 9.5 km (5.9 mi) north-south, 7.5 km (4.7 mi) east-west, total area 56 km^{2} (22 sq mi), no land area, lagoon 11 metres (36 ft) deep
2. Antiope Reef, 180 km (110 mi) northeast (18°16′S 168°25′W), a circular plateau approximately 400 metres (1,300 ft) in diameter, with a least depth of 9.5 metres (31 ft)
3. Haran Reef (also known as Harans Reef), 294 km (183 mi) southeast (21°33′S 168°55′W)

Besides these, Albert Meyer Reef, 326 km (203 mi) southwest (20°53′S 172°19′W), almost 5 km (3.1 mi) long and wide, least depth 3 m (9.8 ft), is not officially claimed by Niue; further, the existence of Haymet Rocks (1,273 km (791 mi) east-southeast) is in doubt.

Niue is one of the world's largest coral islands. The terrain consists of steep limestone cliffs along the coast with a central plateau rising to about 60 metres (200 ft) above sea level. A coral reef surrounds the island, with the only major break in the reef being in the central western coast, close to the capital, Alofi. A number of limestone caves occur near the coast.

The island is roughly oval in shape (with a diameter of about 18 kilometres (11 mi), with two large bays indenting the western coast, Alofi Bay in the centre and Avatele Bay in the south. Between these is the promontory of Halagigie Point. A small peninsula, TePā Point (Blowhole Point), is close to the settlement of Avatele in the southwest. Most of the population resides close to the west coast, around the capital, and in the northwest.

=== Geology ===
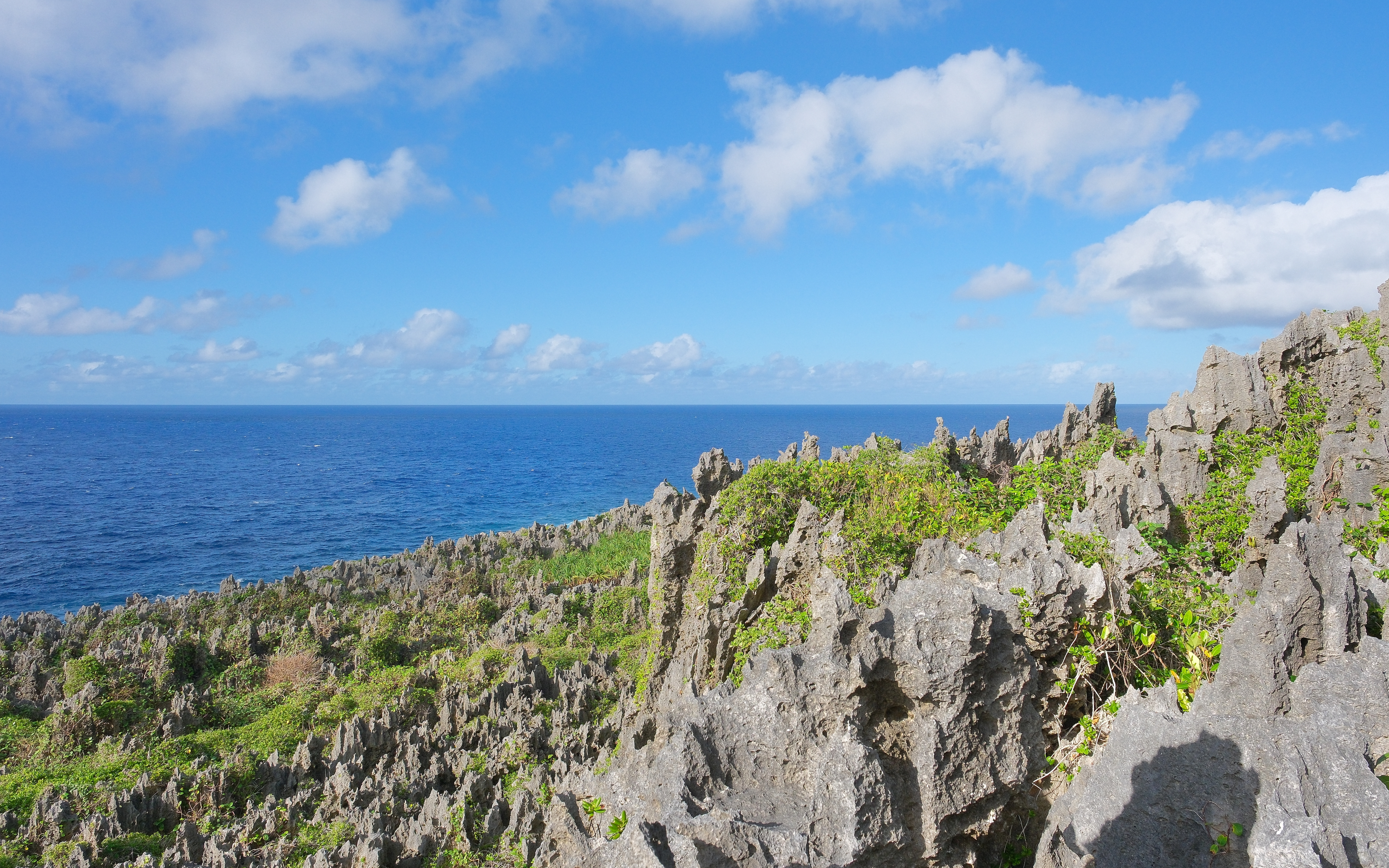
Jagged fossilised coral pinnacles at Togo

Some Niue soils are geochemically very unusual. They are extremely weathered tropical soils, with high levels of iron and aluminium oxides (oxisol) and mercury, and they contain high levels of natural radioactivity, with thorium-230 and protactinium-231 heading the decay chains. This distribution of elements is found naturally on very deep seabeds, but the geochemical evidence suggests that the origin of these elements is extreme weathering of coral and brief sea submergence 120,000 years ago. Endothermal upwelling, by which mild volcanic heat draws deep seawater up through the porous coral, almost certainly contributes.

No adverse health effects from the radioactivity or the other trace elements have been demonstrated, and calculations show that the level of radioactivity is probably much too low to be detected in the population. These unusual soils are very rich in phosphate, but it is not accessible to plants, being in the very insoluble form of iron phosphate, or crandallite. It is thought that similar radioactive soils may exist on Lifou and Mare near New Caledonia, and Rennell in the Solomon Islands, but no other locations are known.

=== Climate ===
The island has a tropical rainforest climate (Af) according to the Köppen climate classification with high temperatures and rainfall throughout the year. The wet season runs from November to April, and the dry season runs from May to October.

Climate data for Alofi
Month	Jan	Feb	Mar	Apr	May	Jun	Jul	Aug	Sep	Oct	Nov	Dec	Year
Record high °C (°F)	38 (100)	38 (100)	32 (90)	36 (97)	30 (86)	32 (90)	35 (95)	37 (99)	36 (97)	31 (88)	37 (99)	36 (97)	38 (100)
Mean daily maximum °C (°F)	28 (82)	29 (84)	28 (82)	27 (81)	26 (79)	26 (79)	25 (77)	25 (77)	26 (79)	26 (79)	27 (81)	28 (82)	27 (81)
Daily mean °C (°F)	26 (79)	27 (81)	26 (79)	25 (77)	25 (77)	23 (73)	22 (72)	23 (73)	23 (73)	24 (75)	25 (77)	26 (79)	25 (77)
Mean daily minimum °C (°F)	23 (73)	24 (75)	24 (75)	23 (73)	22 (72)	21 (70)	20 (68)	20 (68)	21 (70)	21 (70)	22 (72)	23 (73)	22 (72)
Record low °C (°F)	20 (68)	20 (68)	20 (68)	14 (57)	15 (59)	13 (55)	11 (52)	9 (48)	15 (59)	15 (59)	11 (52)	17 (63)	9 (48)
Average precipitation mm (inches)	261.6 (10.30)	253.6 (9.98)	305.6 (12.03)	202.6 (7.98)	138.2 (5.44)	88.9 (3.50)	96.4 (3.80)	105.8 (4.17)	102.4 (4.03)	123.8 (4.87)	145.5 (5.73)	196.2 (7.72)	2,018.4 (79.46)
Source: Weatherbase

=== Environment ===
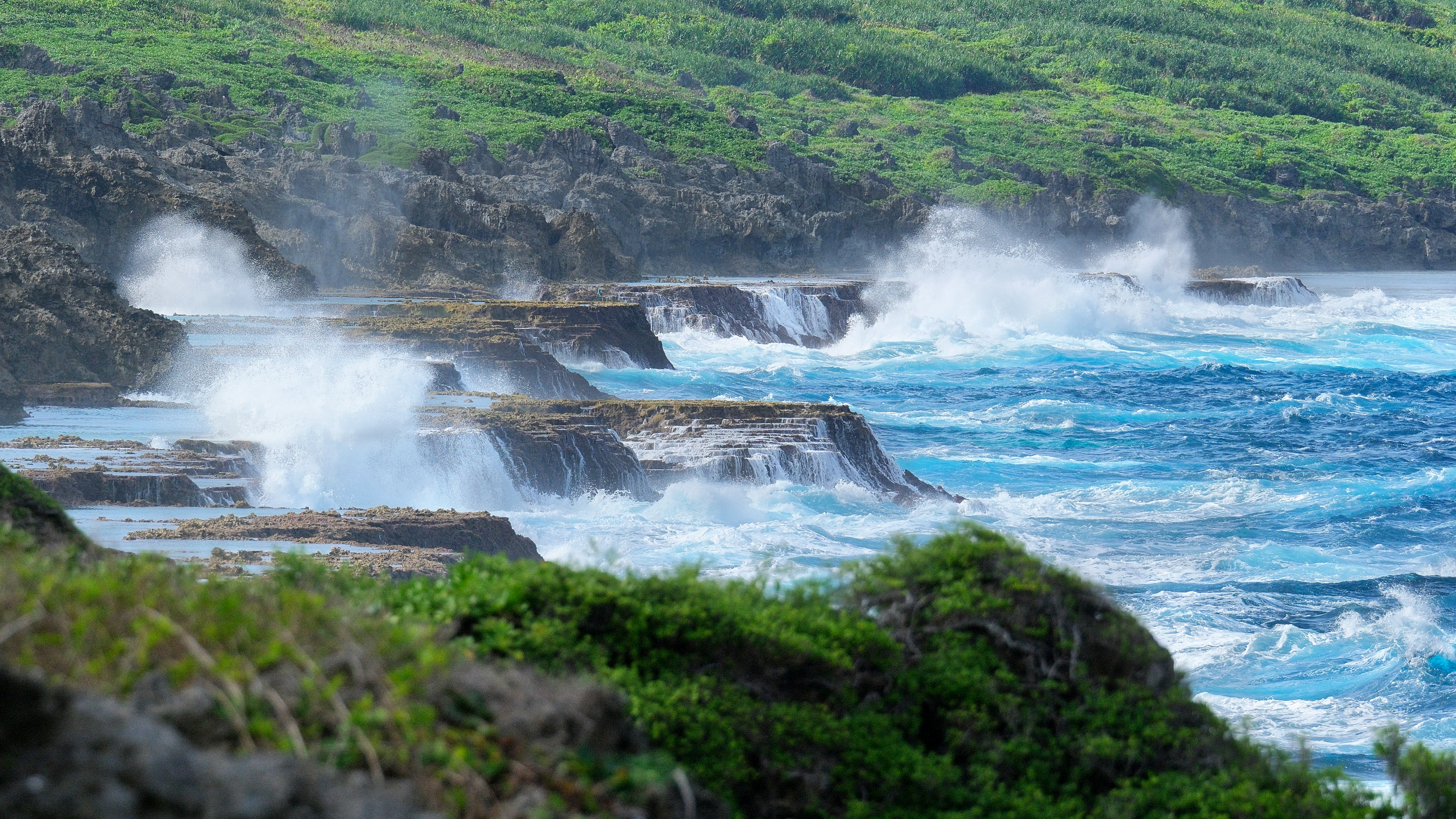
Niue's coastline

Niue is attempting to pursue a policy of "green growth". The Niue Island Organic Farmers Association is currently paving the way to a Multilateral Environmental Agreement (MEA) designed to make Niue the world's first fully organic nation by 2020.

As of 2012, Niue had one of the highest rates of greenhouse gas emissions per capita in the world, due to the small population of the country. Niue aimed to use 80% renewable energy by 2025. In July 2025, the target was shifted to early 2026.

In July 2009, a solar panel system was installed, injecting about 50 kW into the Niue national power grid. This is nominally 6% of the average 833 kW electricity production. The solar panels are at Niue High School (20 kW), Niue Power Corporation office, (1.7 kW) and the Niue Foou Hospital (30 kW). The EU-funded grid-connected photovoltaic systems are supplied under the REP-5 programme and were installed recently by the Niue Power Corporation on the roofs of the high school and the power station office and on ground-mounted support structures in front of the hospital. They will be monitored and maintained by the NPC.

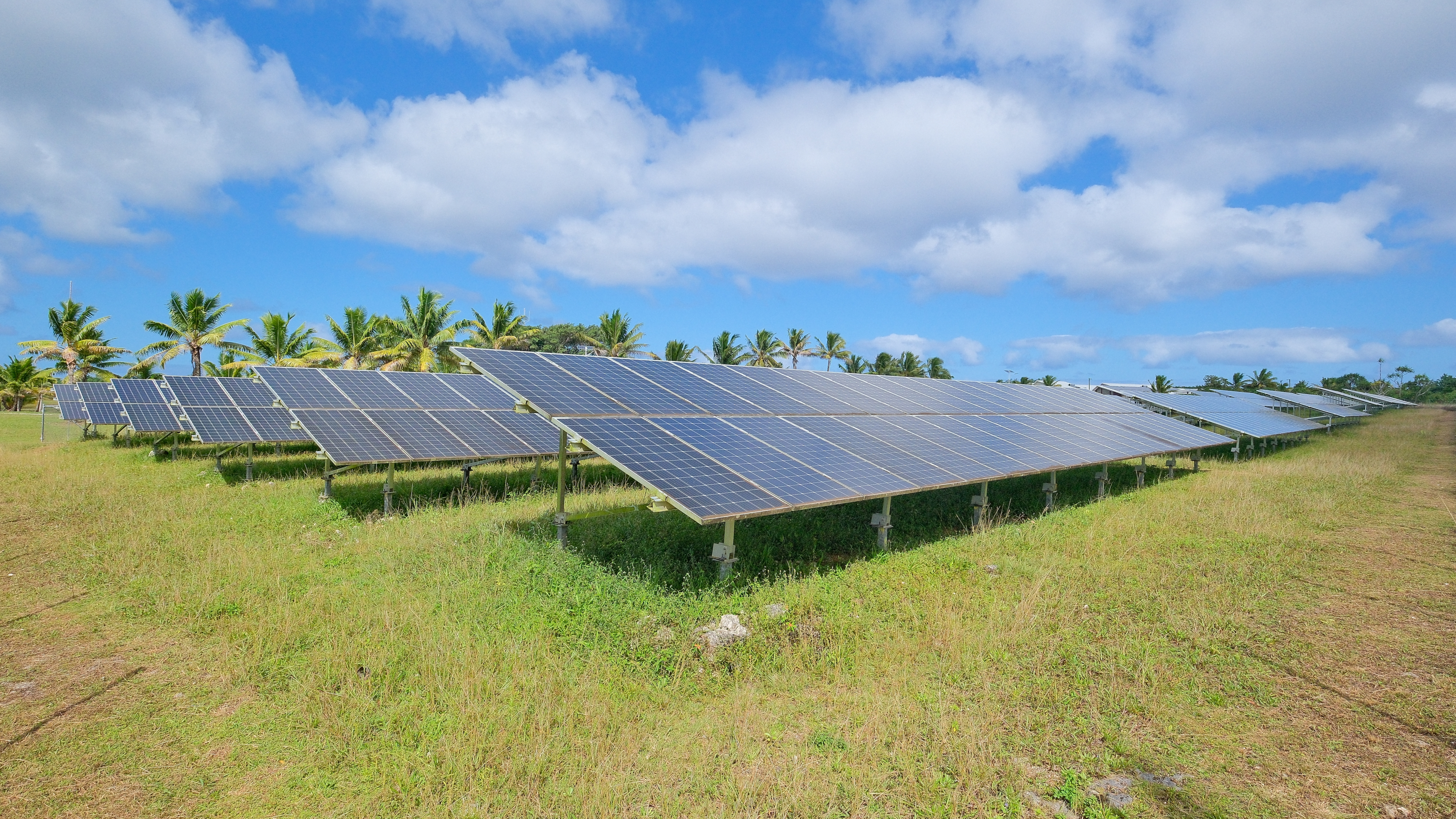
Niue has established several solar power installations, including one near the Niue International Airport.

In 2014, two additional solar power installations were added to the Niue national power grid. One was funded under PALM5 of Japan and is located outside the Tuila power station; so far, only this has battery storage. The second power station is under European Union funding; it is located opposite the Niue International Airport Terminal.

In 2023, the governments of Niue and other island states at risk from climate change (Fiji, the Solomon Islands, Tuvalu, Tonga and Vanuatu) launched the "Port Vila Call for a Just Transition to a Fossil Fuel Free Pacific", calling for the phasing out of fossil fuels; a "rapid and just transition" to renewable energy; and a strengthening of environmental law, including introducing the crime of ecocide.

In 2022, Niue declared its entire EEZ to be a marine park, though enforcement of that declaration would be a challenge. The entire Fisheries Division was reported to have only five staff and there were no locally based patrol boats. Enforcement would depend on stronger support from the New Zealand Defence Forces, though its ability to maintain a continuous presence was limited.

=== Flora and fauna ===
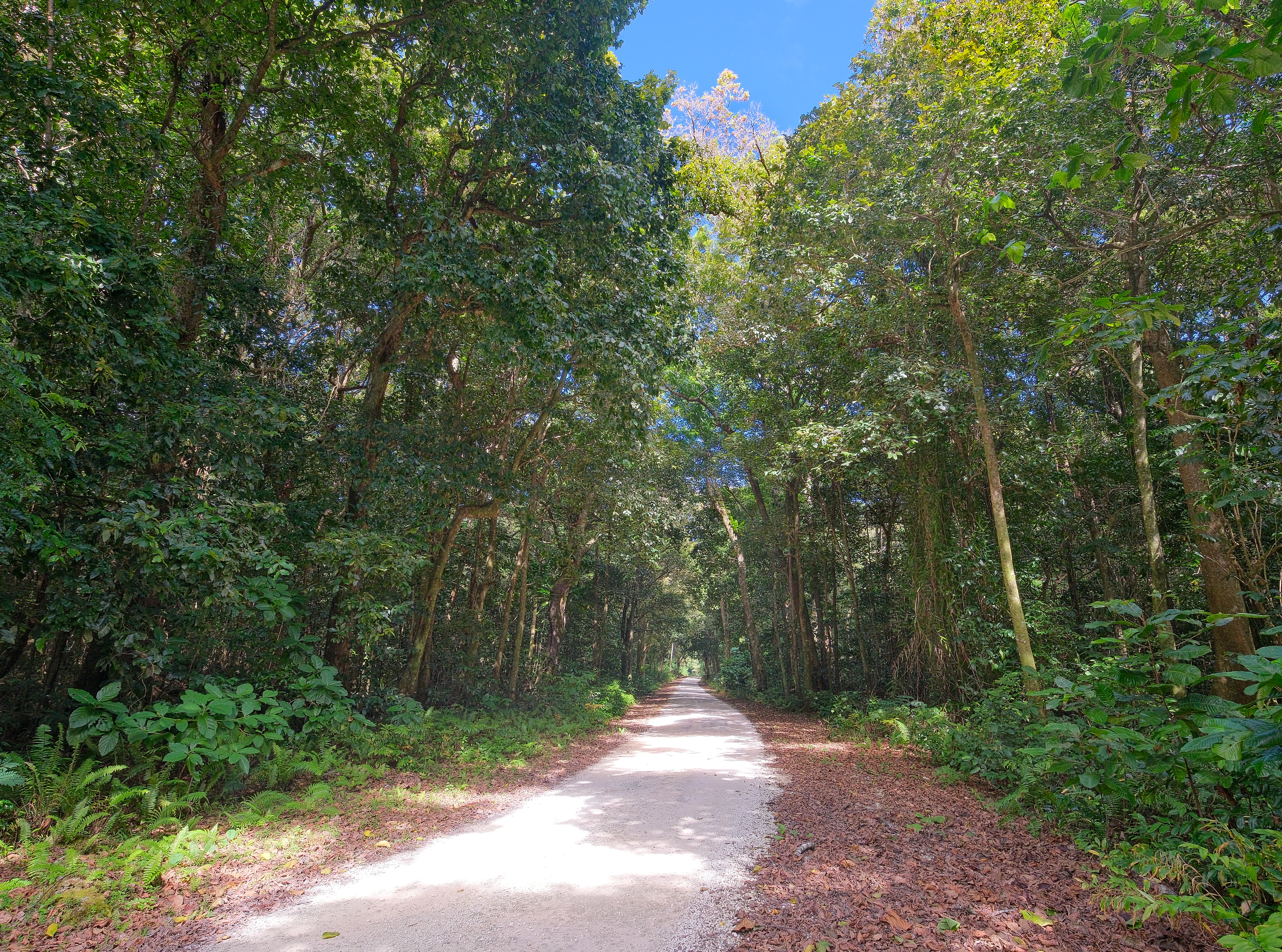
Niue is part of the Tongan tropical moist forests terrestrial ecoregion.

Niue is part of the Tongan tropical moist forests terrestrial ecoregion. The island is home to approximately 60 native or pre-European plants, and approximately 160 naturalised flowering plant species. Compared to other Polynesian islands, Niue has sparse documentation for what plants were traditionally found on the island (almost no records are found between the documentation by James Cook's crew in 1774, and Truman G. Yuncker's botanical survey of the island in 1940).

The Huvalu Forest Conservation Area is a 5,400 hectare (20 sq. mi.) site on the eastern side of the island. It was established in 1992 and protects the largest area of primary forest in Niue. It has been designated an Important Bird Area (IBA) by BirdLife International because it supports populations of crimson-crowned fruit doves, blue-crowned lorikeets, Polynesian trillers and Polynesian starlings.

== Government and politics ==
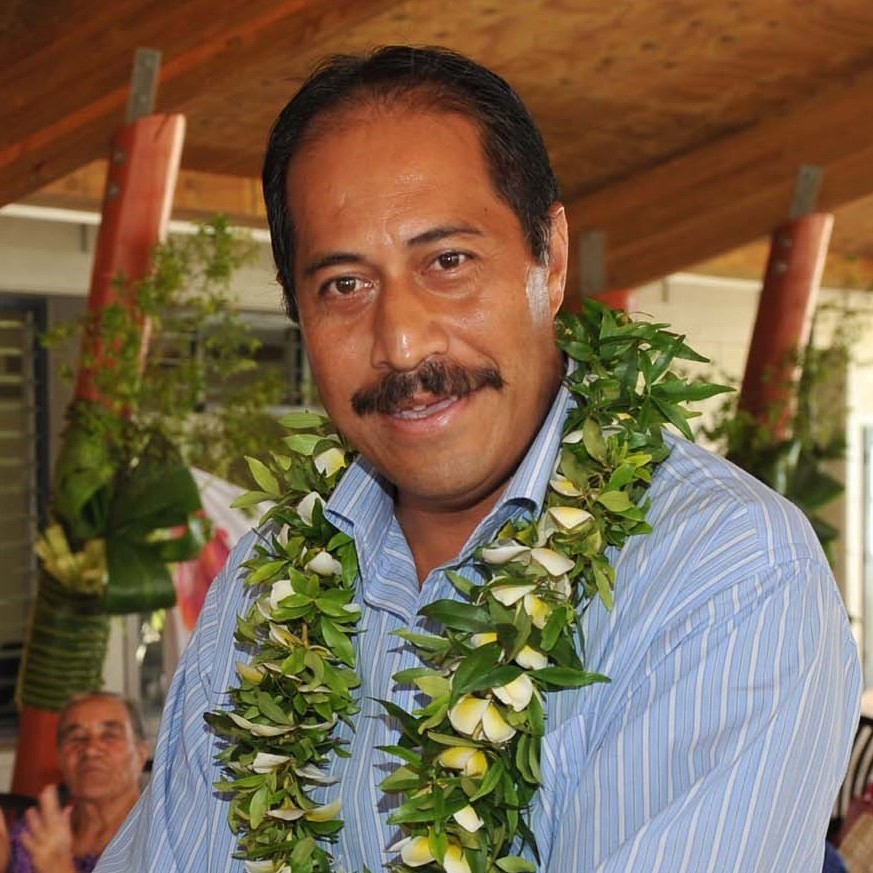
Dalton Tagelagi has served as Prime Minister of Niue since 2020.

The Niue Constitution Act of 1974 vests executive authority in His Majesty the King in Right of New Zealand and in the Governor-General of New Zealand. The Constitution specifies that everyday practice involves the exercise of sovereignty by Cabinet, composed of the Prime Minister (currently Dalton Tagelagi since 11 June 2020) and of three other ministers. The Prime Minister and ministers are members of the Niue Assembly, the nation's parliament.

The Assembly consists of 20 members, 14 of them elected by the electors of each village constituency, and six by all registered voters in all constituencies. Electors must be New Zealand citizens, resident for at least three months, and candidates must be electors and resident for 12 months. Everyone born in Niue must register on the electoral roll.

Niue has no political parties; all Assembly members are independents. The only Niuean political party to have ever existed, the Niue People's Party (1987–2003), won once (in 2002) before disbanding the following year.

The Legislative Assembly elects a Speaker as its first official in the first sitting of the Assembly following an election. The speaker calls for nominations for prime minister; the candidate with the most votes from the 20 members is elected. The prime minister selects three other members to form a Cabinet, the executive arm of government. General elections take place every three years, most recently on 2 May 2026.

The judiciary, independent of the executive and the legislature, includes a High Court and a Court of Appeal, with appeals to the Judicial Committee of the Privy Council in London.

=== Defence and foreign affairs ===
Niue has operated as a self-governing state in free association with New Zealand since 3 September 1974, when the people endorsed the Constitution in a plebiscite. Niue is fully responsible for its internal affairs. Niue's position concerning its external relations is less clear-cut. Section 6 of the Niue Constitution Act provides that: "Nothing in this Act or in the Constitution shall affect the responsibilities of Her Majesty the Queen in right of New Zealand for the external affairs and defence of Niue." Section 8 elaborates but still leaves the position unclear:

Effect shall be given to the provisions of sections 6 and 7 [concerning external affairs and defence and economic and administrative assistance respectively] of this Act, and to any other aspect of the relationship between New Zealand and Niue which may from time to time call for positive co-operation between New Zealand and Niue after consultation between the Prime Minister of New Zealand and the Prime Minister of Niue, and in accordance with the policies of their respective Governments; and, if it appears desirable that any provision be made in the law of Niue to carry out these policies, that provision may be made in the manner prescribed in the Constitution, but not otherwise."

Niue has a representative mission (High Commission) in Wellington, New Zealand.

Initially, Niue's foreign relations and defence were the responsibility of New Zealand. However, Niue gradually began to develop its own foreign relations, independently of New Zealand. It is a member of the Pacific Islands Forum and of a number of regional and international agencies. It is not a member of the United Nations, but is a state party to the United Nations Convention on the Law of the Sea, the United Nations Framework Convention on Climate Change, the Ottawa Treaty and the Treaty of Rarotonga. The country became a member state of UNESCO on 26 October 1993. It established diplomatic relations with the People's Republic of China on 12 December 2007. The joint communique signed by Niue and China differs in its treatment of the Taiwan question from that agreed by New Zealand and China. New Zealand "acknowledged" China's position on Taiwan but has never expressly agreed with it, but Niue "recognises that there is only one China in the world, the Government of the People's Republic of China is the sole legal government representing the whole of China and Taiwan is an inalienable part of the territory of China." Niue established diplomatic relations with India on 30 August 2012. On 10 June 2014, the Government of Niue announced that Niue had established diplomatic relations with Turkey. The Honourable Minister of Infrastructure Dalton Tagelagi formalised the agreement at the Pacific Small Island States Foreign Ministers meeting in Istanbul, Turkey.

People of Niue have fought as part of the New Zealand military. During World War I (1914–1918), Niue sent about 200 soldiers as part of the New Zealand (Māori) Pioneer Battalion in the New Zealand forces.

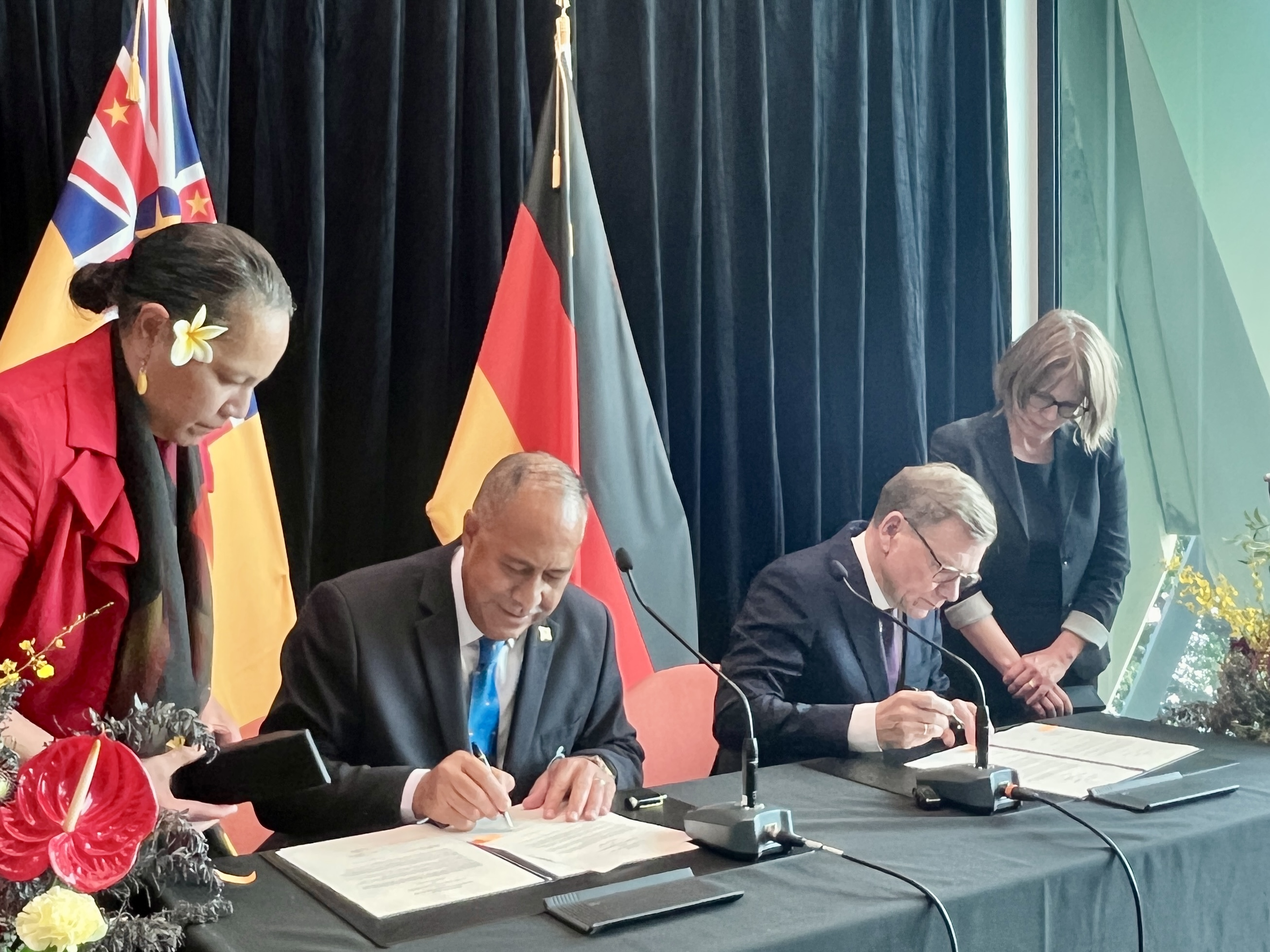
Germany formally recognised Niue as a sovereign state in February 2026 (Germany's Minister of Foreign Affairs Johann Wadephul with Dalton Tagelagi during the signing ceremony in Auckland).

Niue is not a republic, but for a number of years the ISO list of country names (ISO 3166-1) listed its full name as "the Republic of Niue". In its newsletter of 14 July 2011, the ISO acknowledged that this was a mistake and the words "the Republic of" were deleted from the ISO list of country names.

Niue has no regular indigenous military forces; defence is the responsibility of New Zealand. The New Zealand Defence Force has responsibilities for protecting the territory as well as its offshore exclusive economic zone (EEZ). The total offshore EEZ is about 317,500 square kilometres (122,600 sq mi). Vessels of the Royal New Zealand Navy can be employed for this task including its Protector-class offshore patrol vessels. These naval forces may also be supported by Royal New Zealand Air Force aircraft, including P-8 Poseidons. New Zealand forces also provide additional logistics and specialised support for Niue.

However, these forces are limited in size with, for instance, only infrequent air force overflights of the EEZ. In 2023 New Zealand's forces were described by the Government as "not in a fit state" to respond to regional challenges. New Zealand's subsequently announced "Defence Policy and Strategy Statement" noted that shaping the security environment, "focusing in particular on supporting security in and for the Pacific" would receive enhanced attention.On 9 January 2026, Germany formally recognised Niue as a sovereign state and established diplomatic relations with it.

== Economy ==
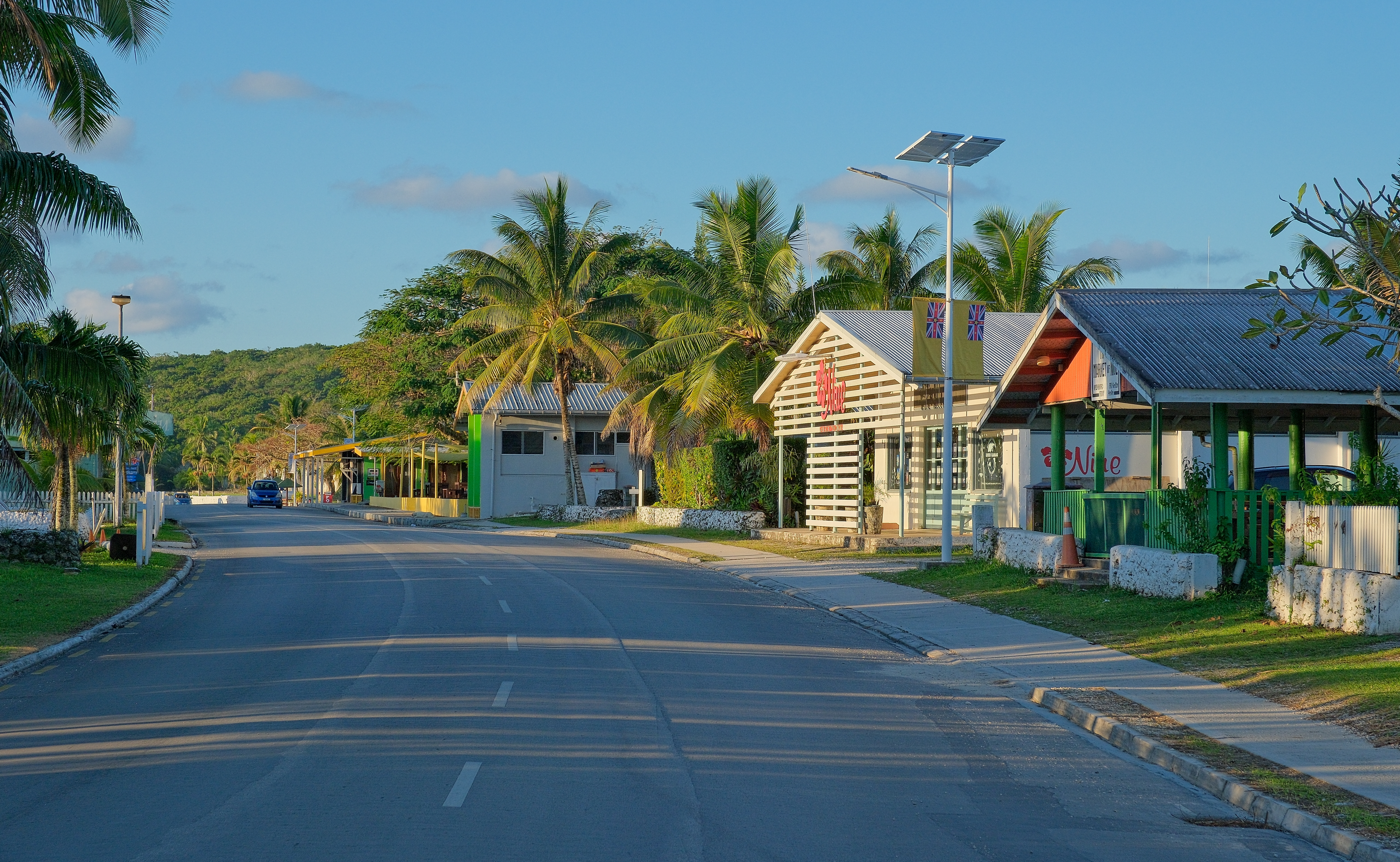
Alofi is the capital of Niue.

Niue's gross domestic product (GDP) was NZ$17 million in 2003, or US$10 million at purchasing power parity. Its GDP had increased to US$24.9 million by 2016. Niue uses the New Zealand dollar.

The Niue Integrated Strategic Plan (NISP) is the national development plan, setting national priorities for development. Cyclone Heta set the island back about two years from its planned timeline to implement the NISP, since national efforts concentrated on recovery efforts. In 2008, Niue had yet to fully recover. After Heta, the government made a major commitment to rehabilitate and develop the private sector. In 2004, the New Zealand government allocated $1 million for the private sector, and spent it on helping businesses devastated by the cyclone, and on construction of the Fonuakula Industrial Park. This industrial park is now completed and some businesses are already operating from there. The Fonuakula Industrial Park is managed by the Niue Chamber of Commerce, a not-for-profit organisation providing advisory services to businesses.

=== Joint ventures ===
The government and the Reef Group from New Zealand started two joint ventures in 2003 and 2004 to develop fisheries and a 120-hectare (300 acre) noni juice operation. Noni fruit comes from Morinda citrifolia, a small tree with edible fruit. Niue Fish Processors Ltd (NFP) is a joint venture company processing fresh fish, mainly tuna (yellowfin, big eye and albacore), for export to overseas markets. NFP operates out of a fish plant in Amanau Alofi South, completed and opened in October 2004.

=== Mining ===
In August 2005, an Australian mining company, Yamarna Goldfields, suggested that Niue might have the world's largest deposit of uranium. By early September these hopes were seen as overly optimistic, and in late October the company cancelled its plans, announcing that exploratory drilling had identified nothing of commercial value. The Australian Securities and Investments Commission filed charges in January 2007 against two directors of the company, now called Mining Projects Group Ltd, alleging that their conduct had been deceptive and that they engaged in insider trading. This case was settled out of court in July 2008, both sides withdrawing their claims.

=== Debt ===
On 27 October 2016, Niue officially declared that all its national debt was paid off. The government plans to spend money saved from servicing loans on increasing pensions and offering incentives to lure expatriates back home. However, Niue is not entirely independent. New Zealand pays $14 million in aid each year and Niue still depends on New Zealand economically. Premier Toke Talagi said Niue managed to pay off US$4 million of debt and had "no interest" in borrowing again, particularly from countries such as China that offered "huge sums that other Pacific islands find too tempting to resist".

=== Revenue ===
Remittances from expatriates were a major source of foreign exchange in the 1970s and early 1980s. Continuous migration to New Zealand has shifted most members of nuclear and extended families there, removing the need to send remittances back home. In the late 1990s, PFTAC conducted studies on the balance of payments, which confirmed that Niueans are receiving few remittances but are sending more money overseas.

==== Foreign aid ====
Foreign aid is a significant source of income, accounting for approximately a third of Niue's annual government revenue. Most aid comes from New Zealand, which has a legal obligation to provide economic and administrative assistance. Other sources of revenue for the government are taxation and trading activities, such as philatelic services and the lease of phone lines.

==== Offshore banking ====
The government briefly considered offshore banking. Under pressure from the US Treasury, Niue agreed to end its support for schemes designed to minimise tax in countries like New Zealand. Niue provides automated Companies Registration, administered by the New Zealand Ministry of Economic Development. The Niue Legislative Assembly passed the Niue Consumption Tax Act in the first week of February 2009, and the 12.5% tax on goods and services was expected to take effect on 1 April 2009. Income tax has been lowered, and import tax may be reset to zero except for "sin" items like tobacco, alcohol and soft drinks. Tax on secondary income has been lowered from 35% to 10%, with the stated goal of fostering increased labour productivity.

==== Internet ====
In 1997, the Internet Assigned Numbers Authority (IANA), under contract with the US Department of Commerce, assigned the Internet Users Society-Niue (IUS-N), a private non-profit, as manager of the .nu top-level domain on the Internet. The stated purpose of IUS-N was to use revenue from .nu domain registrations to support Internet services for Niue. According to a letter to ICANN in 2007, IUS-N's auditors reported an investment of US$3 million in Niue's Internet services between 1999 and 2005, funded by domain registration revenue. In 1999, an agreement was reached between IUS-N and the Government of Niue, recognising IUS-N's management of the .nu ccTLD under IANA's authority. This agreement included commitments to provide free Internet services to government departments and citizens.

A subsequent government disputed this agreement and sought compensation from IUS-N. A Commission of Inquiry in 2005 found no merit in these claims, which were dismissed by the government in 2007. Starting in 2003, IUS-N began expanding Wi-Fi coverage throughout the capital village of Alofi and in several nearby villages and schools, and has been expanding Wi-Fi coverage into the outer villages since then, making Niue the first Wi-Fi nation. Additionally, IUS-N provides secure DSL connections for government departments at no cost.

On 16 December 2020, the Government of Niue initiated proceedings to reassign control of its national webspace, .nu, from the Internet Corporation for Assigned Names and Numbers (ICANN) to itself. This action reflects ongoing efforts by Niue to assert control over its digital assets amid concerns about national sovereignty and economic benefits associated with the .nu domain.

On 23 March 2026, the Niuean government approved a 12-month licence for Starlink to operate as an internet service provider on the island. Previously, accessing a Starlink kit in Niue was prohibited and carried penalties, including a $200 fine or up to three months in prison.

=== Agriculture ===
Taro is a staple food exported to New Zealand.

Agriculture is very important to the lifestyle of Niueans and the economy, and around 204 square kilometres (79 sq mi) of the land area are available for agriculture. Subsistence agriculture is very much part of Niue's culture, where nearly all the households have plantations of taro. Taro is a staple food, and the pink taro now dominant in the taro markets in New Zealand and Australia is a product of Niue. This is one of the naturally occurring taro varieties on Niue, and has a strong resistance to pests. The Niue taro is known in Samoa as "talo Niue" and in international markets as pink taro. Niue exports taro to New Zealand. Tapioca or cassava, yams and kumara also grow very well, as do different varieties of bananas. Coconut meat, passionfruit and limes dominated exports in the 1970s, but in 2008 vanilla, noni and taro were the main export crops.

Most families grow their own food crops for subsistence and sell their surplus at the Niue Makete in Alofi, or export to New Zealand. Coconut crab, or uga, is also part of the food chain; it lives in the forest and coastal areas.

In 2003, the government made a commitment to develop and expand vanilla production with the support of NZAID. Vanilla has grown wild on Niue for a long time. The industry was devastated by Cyclone Heta in early 2004, but has since recovered.

The last agricultural census was in 1989.

=== Tourism ===
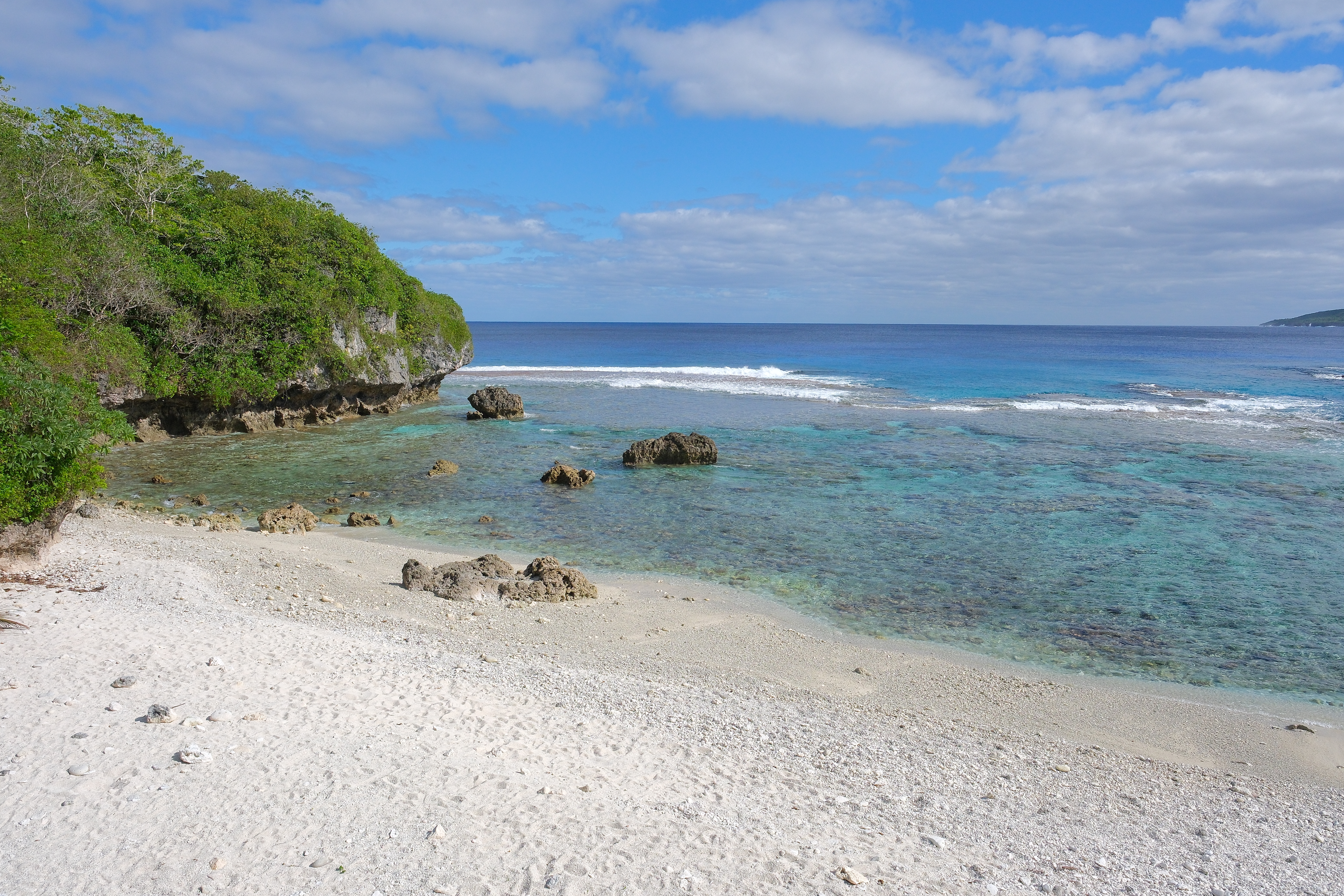
Avatele Beach

Along with fisheries and agriculture, tourism is one of the three priority economic sectors for economic development. In 2006, estimated visitor expenditure reached US$1.6 million (equivalent to about $3M in 2025). The only airport is Niue International Airport, and Air New Zealand is the sole airline, flying twice a week from Auckland. In the early 1990s Niue International Airport was served by a local airline, Niue Airlines, but it closed in 1992.

The sailing season begins in May. Alofi Bay has many mooring buoys and yacht crews can lodge at Niue Backpackers. The anchorage in Niue is one of the least protected in the South Pacific. Other challenges of the anchorage are a primarily coral bottom and many deep spots.

Niue became the world's first dark-sky country in March 2020. The entire island maintains standards of light development and keeps light pollution limited. Guided Astro-tours will be offered for tourists, led by trained Niuean community members.

==== Matavai Resort controversy ====
New Zealand businessman Earl Hagaman, founder of Scenic Hotel Group, was awarded a contract in 2014 to manage the Matavai Resort in Niue after he made a $101,000 political donation to the New Zealand National Party, which at that time led a minority government in New Zealand. The resort is subsidised by New Zealand, which wants to bolster tourism there. In 2015, New Zealand announced $7.5m in additional funding for expansion of the resort.

The selection of the Matavai contractor was made by the Niue Tourism Property Trust, whose trustees are appointed by New Zealand Foreign Affairs minister Murray McCully. Prime Minister John Key said he did not handle campaign donations, and that Niue premier Toke Talagi has long pursued tourism as a growth strategy. McCully denied any link between the donation, the foreign aid and the contractor selection.

=== Information technology ===
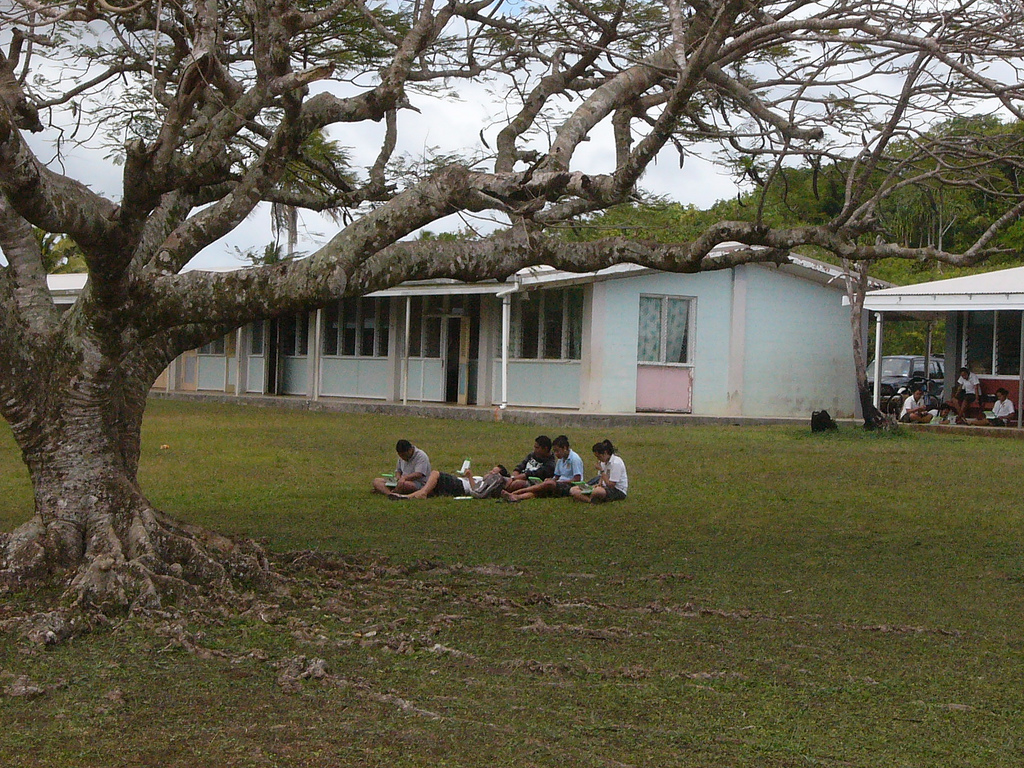
Students using their OLPC laptops in the schoolyard.

The Census of Households and Population in 1986 was the first to be processed using a personal computer with the assistance of David Marshall, FAO adviser on agricultural statistics, advising UNFPA demographer Lawrence Lewis and Niue government statistician Bill Vakaafi Motufoou to switch from using manual tabulation cards. In 1987, Statistics Niue got its new personal computer NEC PC AT use for processing the 1986 census data; personnel were sent on training in Japan and New Zealand to use the new computer. The first Computer Policy was developed and adopted in 1988.

In 2003, Niue became the first country in the world to provide state-funded wireless internet to all inhabitants.

In August 2008, it has been reported that all school students have what is known as the OLPC XO-1, a specialised laptop by the One Laptop per Child project designed for children in the developing world.

In July 2011, Telecom Niue launched pre-paid mobile services (Voice/EDGE – 2.5G) as Rokcell Mobile based on the commercial GSM product of vendor Lemko. Three BTS sites will cover the nation. International roaming is not currently available.

In January 2015, Telecom Niue completed the laying of the fibre optic cable around Niue connecting all the 14 villages, making land line phones and ADSL internet connection available to households.

Niue was connected to the Manatua Fibre Cable in 2021.

== Demographics ==
=== Population ===
Historical population
Year	Pop.	±%
1900	4,015	—
1911	3,943	−1.8%
1921	3,750	−4.9%
1931	3,797	+1.3%
1945	4,253	+12.0%
1951	4,553	+7.1%
1961	4,864	+6.8%
1971	4,990	+2.6%
1981	3,281	−34.2%
1991	2,239	−31.8%
2001	1,788	−20.1%
2011	1,611	−9.9%
2022	1,681	+4.3%

The 2022 Niue Census of Population and Housing enumerated a population of 1,681, a decrease of around 2.2 per cent over the 2017 figure. Of this, 1,564 (93 per cent) considered Niue to be their place of usual residence, a decrease of 27 from 2017. Migration is a significant driver of population change, with 221 residents aged 5 and over not living in Niue five years prior to the census, suggesting substantial immigration. Niue has a population density of 6.0 inhabitants per square kilometre (16/sq mi). The majority of the population is located in the villages of Alofi South (25.2 per cent), Alofi North (11.1 per cent), Hakupu, and Tamakautoga (both 10.7 per cent).

=== Ethnicity ===
According to the 2022 census, 1,153 (73.7 per cent) of residents identified of Niuean ethnicity. Of this, 1070 (68.4 per cent) identified as Niuean and 83 (5.3 per cent) identified as part-Niuean. 411 residents identified as other ethnic groups, among them 68 Tuvaluans, 76 Samoans, 77 Tongans, 63 Fijians, and 27 Filipinos.

=== Languages ===
The official languages of Niue are English and Niuean, a Polynesian language related to Tongan and Samoan. As of 2022, 1,014 (69.7 per cent) of residents reported proficiency in speaking Niuean. The number of residents who speak Niuean has been in decline since 2006.

=== Religion ===
According to the 2022 census, the majority of Niueans are religious, with only 112 residents (7.2 per cent) reporting no religion. Of the Niuean population, 961 (61.4 per cent) are affiliated with the Ekalesia Niue Church, a Christian denomination; 137 (8.8 per cent) are affiliated with the Church of Jesus Christ of Latter-day Saints; and 114 (7.3 per cent) are affiliated with the Roman Catholic Church.

=== Health ===
Healthcare in Niue is administered by the Niue Department of Health (NDOH), with the Niue Foou Hospital serving as a hub for the majority of the country's healthcare services. The hospital provides only primary and secondary care, and patients requiring tertiary care are sent to hospitals in New Zealand. Specialist healthcare providers from New Zealand visit Niue regularly to provide clinics.

=== Education ===
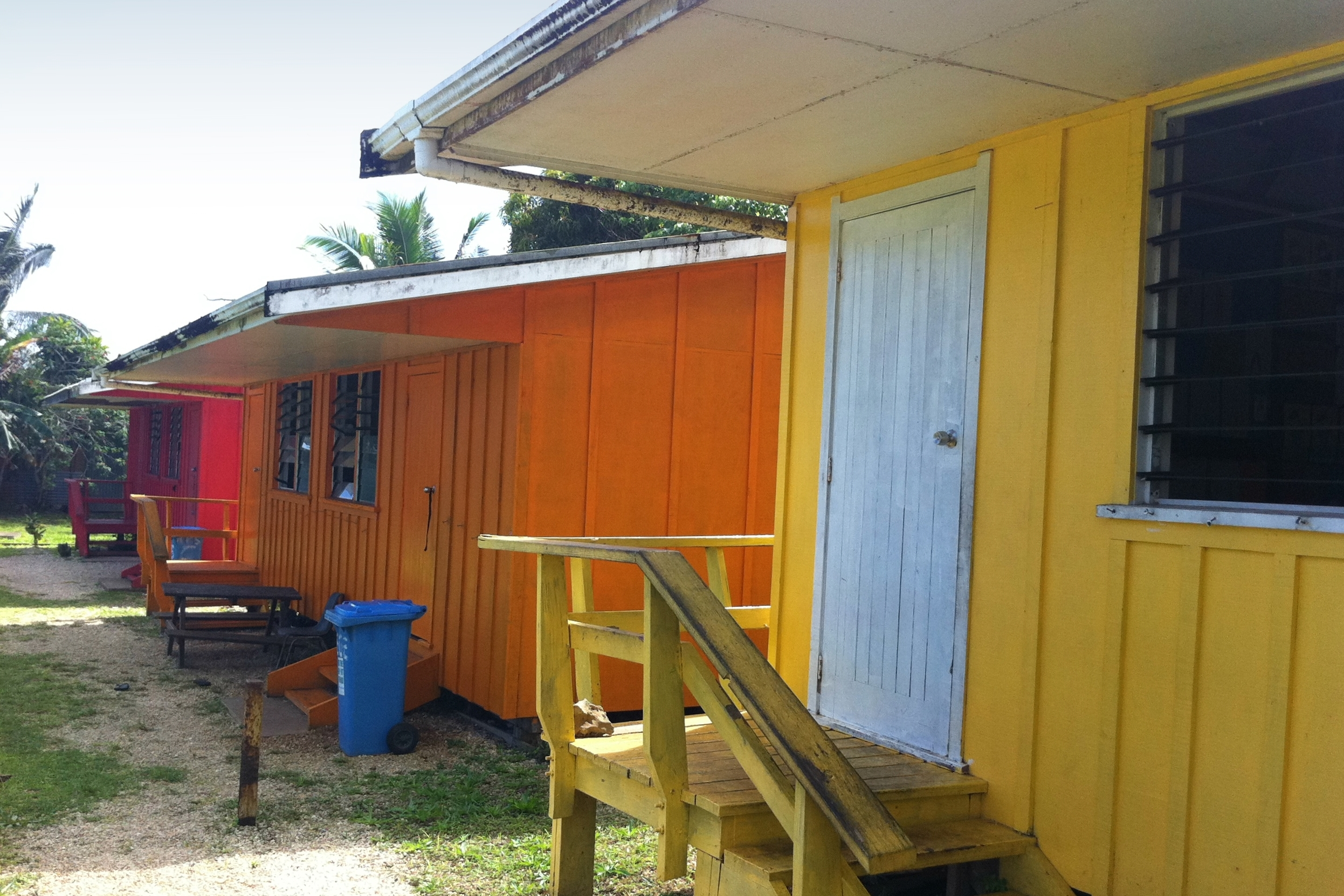
The Niue Primary School is one of two public schools in the country.

Niue has two public schools: the Niue Primary School and the Niue High School. The primary school serves students from years one to six, and the high school from years seven to 13. Enrolment is mandatory for children ages five to 16. Students in Niue have the opportunity to earn scholarships or a university entrance certificate to further their education in New Zealand or other countries.

According to the 2022 census, trade certifications or diplomas are the highest formal education attained by men in Niue at 19.5 per cent, a decrease from 22 per cent in 2017. Female Niueans have a higher likelihood of acquiring a university education, with 25.9 per cent of females completing a degree compared to 22.1 per cent of males. 28.7 per cent of the Niueans aged 60 and above had no qualifications.

== Culture ==
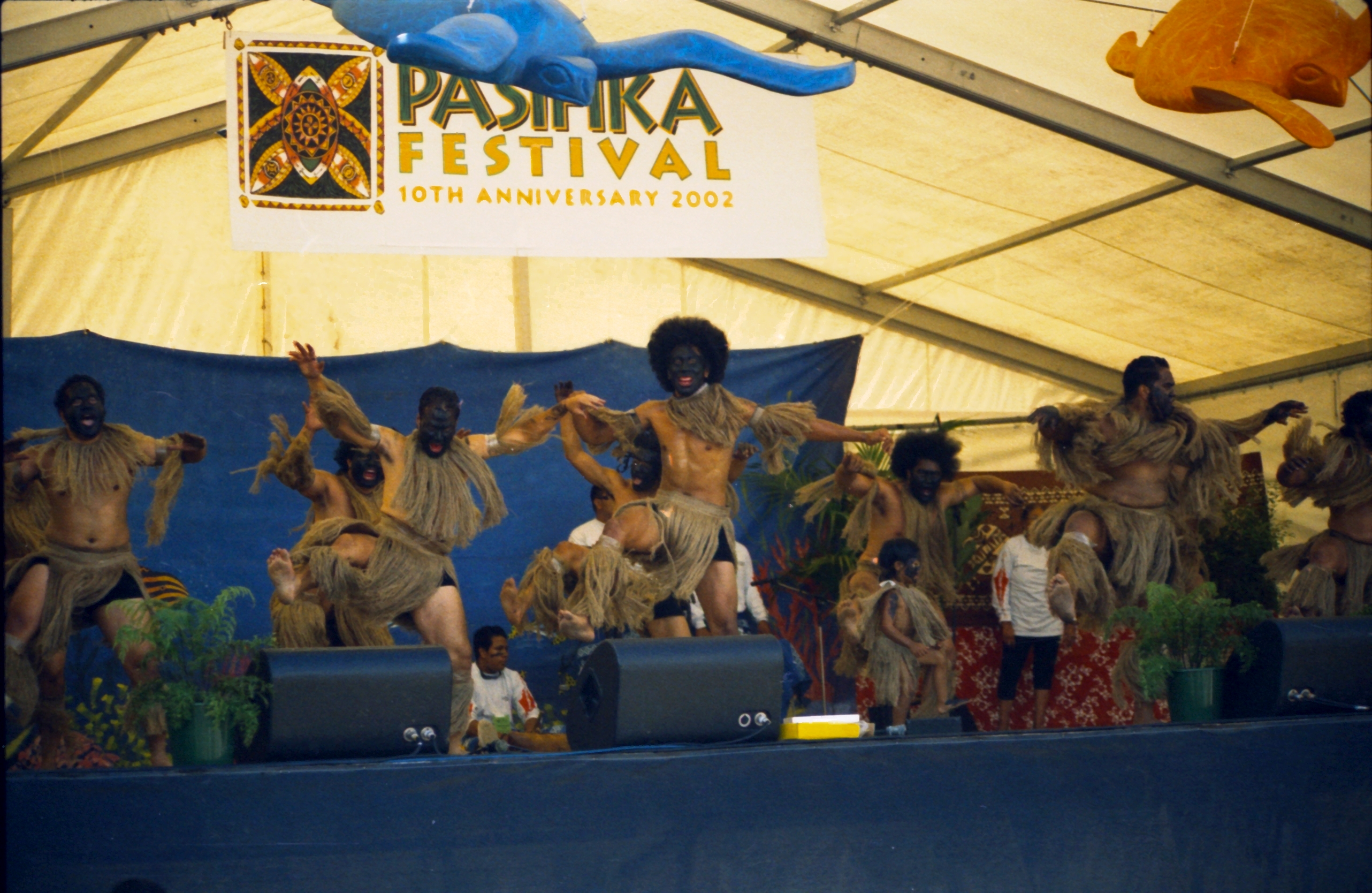
Niuean dancers at the Pasifika Festival

Niue is the birthplace of New Zealand artist and writer John Pule. Author of The Shark That Ate the Sun, he also paints tapa cloth inspired designs on canvas. In 2005, he co-wrote Hiapo: Past and Present in Niuean Barkcloth, a study of a traditional Niuean artform, with Australian writer and anthropologist Nicholas Thomas.

Taoga Niue is a new Government Department responsible for the preservation of culture, tradition and heritage. Recognising its importance, the Government has added Taoga Niue as the sixth pillar of the Niue Integrated Strategic Plan (NISP).

=== Media ===
Niue has two broadcast outlets, Television Niue and Radio Sunshine, managed and operated by the Broadcasting Corporation of Niue, and one newspaper, the Niue Star.

=== Arts ===
Hiapo is a traditional art form in Niue, it is considered similar to Siapo or Ngatu Tonga. Hiapo is made by beating the inner bark of the paper mulberry tree until it becomes a pliable tapa cloth, which is then decorated using natural dyes and stencils. Some Niuean hiapo artists include John Pule and Cora-Allan Wickliffe.

=== Folk dances ===
==== Tā Mē ====
The Tā Mē is a traditional group performance, celebrating significant occasions such as, the opening of a new building or facility, weddings, birthdays, launches, milestones and fundraising events. It involves both men and women singing and dancing to Niuean songs. This is often accompanied by musical instruments like the guitar, ukulele and sometimes a wooden slit drum called a nafa or palau.

==== Takalo ====
The Takalo is Niue’s most prominent traditional dance, historically a war dance performed by male warriors. It served as a formal challenge to assess the intentions of approaching parties, functioning as a border‑security ritual before battle.

===== Origins and meaning =====
The term takalo derives from Proto‑Nuclear Polynesian ta(a)-kalo, meaning “play” or “game,” with semantic links to striking, dodging, and positioning. In Vagahau Niue usage, it specifically refers to “evading blows” or “positioning oneself with a weapon.” Modern takalo compositions continue to emerge. For example, the 1964 takalo Ko Mautolu Nei, composed by Macmillian Etuata for the Hakupu Men’s Rugby Team, uses intimidating lyrics such as “Ko mautolu nei ko e tau tagata kai tagata” (“We are the people who eat other people”). Today, the Takalo is performed at formal occasions such as weddings, birthdays and as Polyfest items.

===== Weapons =====
The tau koloa koli takalo are weapons used by performers during a takalo to emphasize facial expressions, rhythm, and movements of the body.

Traditional weapons that are used in a takalo includes:

- Katoua
- Gēgē
- Ulu fua miti
- Tao

===== Ceremonial role =====
With there being a decline in warfare, the takalo evolved into a ceremonial welcome performed for individuals such as:

- royalty,
- heads of state,
- prime ministers,
- presidents,
- people with chief titles.

=== Museums ===
In 2004, Cyclone Heta destroyed the Huanaki Cultural Centre & Museum. The damage resulted in the destruction of the buildings, but also the loss of over 90% of the museum's collections. In 2018 Fale Tau Tāoga Museum opened, a new national museum for Niue.

=== Cuisine ===
Due to the island's location and the fact that the Niue produce a significant array of fruits and vegetables, natural local produce, especially coconut, features in many of the dishes of the islands, as does fresh seafood. Takihi, the national dish, is made from coconut cream and thinly sliced taro and papaya layered on top of each other until it forms a cake like structure. Traditionally and popularly, it is wrapped in taro leaves and is cooked in an Umu (earth oven), but nowadays people cook their takihi in their ovens at home.

=== Sport ===
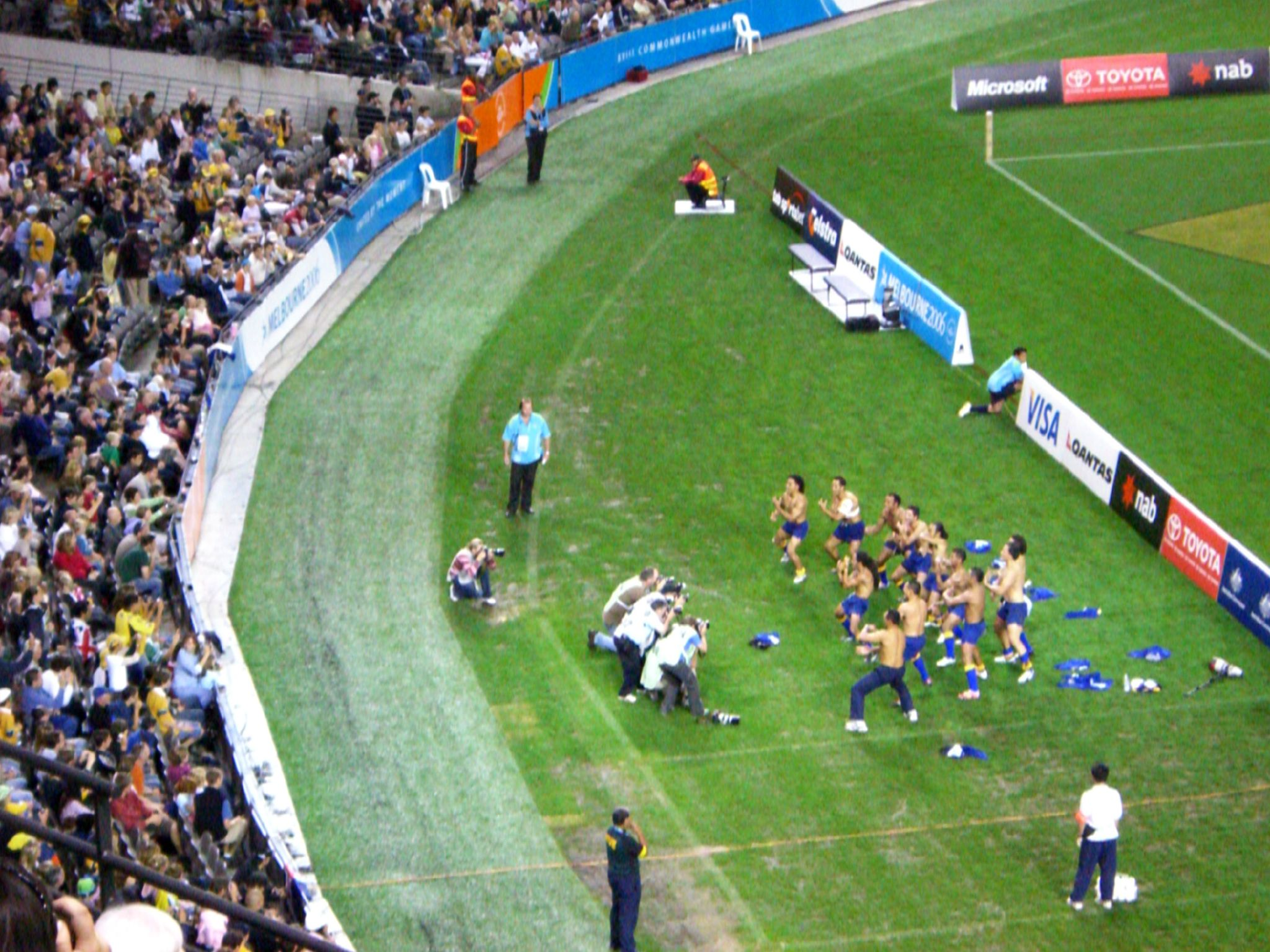
The Niue sevens team performing a takalo

Despite being a small country, a number of sports are popular. Rugby union is the most popular sport, played by both men and women; Niue was the 2008 FORU Oceania Cup champions. Netball is played only by women. There is a nine-hole golf course at Fonuakula and a single lawn bowling green. Association football is a popular sport, as evidenced by the Niue Soccer Tournament, though the Niue national football team has played only two matches. Rugby league is also a popular sport.

Niue participates in the Commonwealth Games, but unlike the Cook Islands, it is not a member of the International Olympic Committee (IOC) and does not compete in the Olympic Games. Per IOC rules, participation in the Olympics requires being "an independent State recognised by the international community".

== See also ==
- Outline of Niue
- Bibliography of Niue
