= New Zealand heraldry =

Use of heraldic symbols in New Zealand

- Coat of arms of New Zealand used since 1956
- Heraldic tradition: Gallo-British
- Governing body: College of Arms (disputed)
- Chief officer: Phillip O'Shea, New Zealand Herald of Arms Extraordinary

New Zealand heraldry refers to the cultural tradition of the use of coats of arms and other heraldic devices within the country. New Zealand largely follows the Gallo-British tradition, a result of the colonisation of the country by the British. Māori cultural elements and native New Zealand flora and fauna are commonly used in New Zealand heraldry.

New Zealand does not have its own heraldic authority, and instead primarily uses the extant British heraldic authorities, namely the English College of Arms and Scottish Lord Lyon King of Arms. A New Zealand-based officer of arms affiliated with the College of Arms does exist, titled the New Zealand Herald of Arms Extraordinary. Phillip O'Shea has been said officer since the creation of the title in 1978.

== Heraldic authority ==
New Zealand does not presently have its own independent heraldic authority which grants or records arms, though the College of Arms in London claims to be "the official heraldic authority for...New Zealand". According to the guidelines of the Cabinet Manual, the College has been delegated these responsibilities by the Sovereign of New Zealand in their capacity as the "Fount of all Honour". However, the legal basis for this "official" status for the College of Arms is disputed.

On 6 February 1978 Queen Elizabeth II established the New Zealand Herald of Arms Extraordinary as the officer of arms responsible for advising the Crown, New Zealand government and New Zealand Defence Force on heraldic matters, and for liaising between New Zealand and the English College of Arms. Although affiliated with the College of Arms, the New Zealand Herald of Arms Extraordinary lives and works in New Zealand, and is not a member of the College Chapter. The current New Zealand Herald of Arms Extraordinary is Phillip Patrick O’Shea.

== Coats of arms ==
The heraldry of New Zealand has added indigenous animals (mostly birds) to the existing heraldic bestiary, along with native flora and traditional Māori motifs.

=== National arms ===
Coat of arms of New Zealand (1956–Present)

Coat of arms of New Zealand, escutcheon only

Coat of arms of New Zealand (1911–1956)

New Zealand was first granted arms by King George V via royal warrant on 26 August 1911, following a design competition in 1908 which had been won by James McDonald, a draughtsman in the Department of Tourist and Health Resorts. The warrant was published in the New Zealand Gazette of 11 January 1912.

The official blazon for the 1911 arms was:

Escutcheon: Quarterly: azure and gules on a pale argent three lymphads (sailing vessels) sable, in the first quarter four mullets in cross of the last (Note: Despite the "last" tincture mentioned being "sable" (i.e. black), they are usually instead depicted in "argent" (i.e. silver/white).) each surmounted by a mullet of the second (representing the constellation of the Southern Cross), in the second quarter a fleece, in the third a garb (wheat sheaf), and in the fourth two mining hammers in saltire all or;

Crest: On a wreath of the colours a demi-lion rampant guardant or supporting a flagstaff erect proper thereon flying to the sinister the Union flag;

Supporters: On the dexter side a female figure proper vested argent supporting in the dexter hand a flagstaff proper hoisted thereon the ensign of the Dominion of New Zealand, and on the sinister side a Māori rangatira vested proper holding in his dexter hand a taiaha all proper.

Motto: Onward

In 1956, a revised version of the arms was approved by Queen Elizabeth II. The new arms depicted the supporters facing each other rather than facing the viewer, replaced the crest with St Edward's Crown, replaced the scrolls in the compartment with fern branches, and replaced the motto "Onward" with the words "New Zealand". However, the central shield remained unaltered from the 1911 arms.

=== Civic arms ===
Some, but not all, local authorities in New Zealand use heraldic arms. The arms of the capital, Wellington, combines elements from the arms of Aurthur Wellesley, 1st Duke of Wellington with elements from the national coat of arms. The coat of arms of Christchurch also has charges from the national arms.

Some councils have been granted arms by the College of Arms or the Court of the Lord Lyon, while others have adopted their own arms. While several councils had used similar devices earlier, Auckland City Council was the first council in New Zealand to be granted an "official" coat of arms by the College of Arms in 1911.

Coats of arms are often seen as old-fashioned and are rarely used by councils, who prefer to use brand logos. Auckland Council, representing the largest city in New Zealand, does not currently use any arms. Some local coats of arms, such as those of Hamilton and Palmerston North, have been accused of not accurately or inappropriately reflecting their areas' history and diversity, with suggestions that they should be changed.

The unauthorised use of the coat of arms of a local authority can be an offense.

==== Current ====
Arms of local authorities in New Zealand (non-exhaustive)
Local authority	Image	Date adopted	Heraldic authority	Blazon / Description	Ref.
Whangarei District Council		1967	College of Arms	Escutcheon: Or on a pale azure between a kauri tree couped and a Jersey cow's head cabossed proper an obelisk argent representing the Whangarei and District War Memorial on a chief embattled barry wavy of four azure and argent a lymphad sail set pennon and flags flying or. Crest: On a wreath of the colours in front of a demi sun or a striped marlin leaping to the dexter proper. Supporters: On the dexter side a Māori in native dress supporting with the dexter hand a taiaha and on the sinister side a figure representing the Reverend Samuel Marsden the early nineteenth century Anglican missionary all proper. Motto: Non nobis solum ("Not to ourselves alone")	
Hamilton City Council		1946	assumed	Main article: Coat of arms of Hamilton, New Zealand Escutcheon: Barry-wavy of eight argent and azure; on a bend verte, 3 oxen heads erased, or. Crest: A mural crown. Supporters: A pūkeko, on either side, rampant proper.	
Tauranga City Council	Link to file	c.1963	assumed	The Tauranga coat of arms comprises brown wool bales on a royal blue background in the top left, a gold sheaf of wheat on a red background in the top right, and a grey ship on a blue background at the bottom of the shield, with a rising sun as the crest. Motto: Advance	
Kawerau District Council		1985	College of Arms	Originally granted to the Kawerau Borough Council. Escutcheon: Per pale indented (an allusion to the teeth of a saw and possibly also to Māori legends associated with Pūtauaki) and per chevron (an allusion to Pūtauaki) or and vert counterchanged in chief a pine-tree couped proper (representing the local forestry industry) and a kō (digging-stick) or and in base barry wavy of three azure and argent (representing the Tarawera River). Crest: Upon a helm with a wreath or and vert a representation of a koruru Māori carved head proper (representing the Māori history of the area) Motto: Kawerau	
Rotorua Lakes Council		1963	College of Arms	Escutcheon: Azure on a chevron or a rainbow trout leaping proper between in chief a pine tree and a sprig of kōwhai leaved slipped and flowered and a geyser issuing from rock in base all also proper. Crest: On a wreath of the colours a male huia bird standing in a brake of New Zealand fern proper. Supporters: On the dexter side a figure representing a farm settler of the nineteenth century, at his feet a cattle dog sejant and on the sinister side a figure representing a Māori chieftain all proper. Motto: Tātau tātau ("We together")	
Gisborne District Council		c.1968	College of Arms	Escutcheon: Argent a pall reversed azure (representing the Taruheru and Waimata rivers combining into the Tūranganui River) between in chief two bulls' heads erased gules (representing agriculture) and in base a mitre and on a chief wavy azure (representing the sea) a representation of HM Bark "Endeavour" (of the 18th century) in full sail proper. Crest: On a wreath of the colours in front of a sun rising or a mountain peak azure representing Mount Hikurangi issuing from clouds proper. Supporters: On the dexter side a lion queue fourche ermines collared dovetailed or and on the sinister side a lion or collared dovetailed sable (taken from the coat of arms of William Gisborne) standing upon [the compartment]. Compartment: The prow and forepart and the afterpart and stern of the Māori war canoes Tākitimu and Horouta, respectively, and joined amidships by a carved Māori koruru head affrontly (taken from the original Tūranga wharenui). Motto: Endeavour	
Napier City Council		1951	College of Arms	Escutcheon: Barry wavy of six azure and argent a fleece or (representing the wool industry) on a chief of the second three roses gules barbed and seeded proper. (from the arms of Francis Napier, 6th Lord Napier) Crest: A hawk's leg couped and reversed (from the arms of Edward Hawke, 1st Baron Hawke) grasping with the claw a bone club called wahaika proper. Supporters: On the dexter side a lion and the sinister side a kiwi both or. Motto: Faith and Courage	
Hastings District Council		1993	assumed	Escutcheon: Per pale vert and argent, in dexter a cross-crosslet fitchy or (for Havelock North Borough Council); in sinister, on a cross carved with a Māori pattern gules, a sun in splendour or (for Hawke's Bay County Council); on a chief party per pale argent and vert, a lion passant guardant, armed and langued gules within an orle of fern leaves all counterchanged (for Hastings City Council). An inescutcheon Or charged with a manche Gules (for Warren Hastings). Crest: On a wreath of the colours, clouds argent, rays or, a sunburst supporting a toothed wheel, perforated of six, centred and rimmed argent, gules. Supporters: Dexter, a ram, tail couped, horned and hoofed or, proper, supporting on a staff proper palewise flying to the dexter an ensign sable, two bars argent edged and charged with a hawk rising or (for Hawke's Bay and Lord Hawke). Sinister, a bull, armed and hoofed or, supporting a staff proper palewise flying to the sinister, edged or, a New Zealand ensign; all supported by a profusion of apples, pears, peaches, grapes and miro berries with their leaves, surmounting a Māori style carved panel representing Rongomatane and Haumia-tiketike, all proper. Motto: Urbis Et Ruris Concordia ("Town and Country in Harmony")	
Central Hawke's Bay District Council			assumed	Escutcheon: Vert. On a fess argent, two bars wavy azure (representing the Waipawa and Tukituki rivers). In chief, a sun in splendour between in dexter a garb banded gules, and in sinister a fleece banded gules, and in base a lymphad, sail furled, flags and pennant flying and oars in action gules, all or.	
Whanganui District Council		1955		Escutcheon: Gules on a Bend wavy argent cotised wavy or between two escallops of the second three lymphads each fesswise that in the centre sable the others of the first all with sails furled and pennons flying on a chief also of the second a ram's head caboshed proper between two open books proper bound gules edged gold. Crest: On a wreath of the colours on a mount vert a representation of the Rutland Blockhouse proper. Supporters: On the dexter side a lion guardant azure charged on the shoulder with four mullets one two and one gules fimbriated argent and on the sinister side a tuatara lizard upon a rock proper. Motto: Sans Dieu Rien ("Without God Nothing") The shells are taken from the arms of William Petre, 11th Baron Petre, the lymphads are taken from the arms of William Hogg Watt, while the bend is intended to represent the Whanganui River.	
Manawatū District Council	Link to file		assumed	The shield of the coat of arms of Manawatū District is green with three huia feathers in the base, taken from the badge of the Feilding Agricultural High School and in the chief a ram's head on the left and cogwheels on the right. On a fess there are two silver bars, representing the Pohangina and Oroua rivers, separated by five golden lozenges, representing Feilding, Kairanga, Kiwitea, Oroua and Pohangina and inspired by the arms of the Earl of Denbigh and the Duke of Manchester. The crest is a tūī with a small flowering flax branch.	
Palmerston North City Council		1989	College of Arms	The arms of Palmerston North contain several visual puns on the name of the city. Escutcheon: Per pale or and azure dexter an eagle displayed azure (inspired by the arms of Lord Palmerston) crowned or sinister a tower also or all within a bordure per pale azure and gold. Crest: Within a mural crown or a mount of native sedge grass proper thereon between two fronds of New Zealand fern also proper a lion passant gules holding in the dexter fore paw an escallop gold (taken from the badge of a palmer). Supporters: On the dexter side a Māori chief (modelled on Te Peeti Te Aweawe and representing tangata whenua) and on the sinister side a european woman in early-to-mid-19th century domestic working dress (representing the European settlers), both proper. Compartment: A mount of native sedge grass also proper. Motto: Palmam qui meruit ferat ("Let him, who has earned it, bear the palm") (the motto of Lord Nelson)	
Masterton District Council	Link to file	1953	College of Arms	The Masterton coat of arms were originally granted to the Masterton Borough Council, having been donated by the Sellar family, before being adopted by the Masterton District Council. The shield of the coat of arms is gold, with a green chief. The lower part of the shield depicts a black martlet between two green chevronels (in allusion to Joseph Masters), while on the chief there is an open book between two golden fleeces symbolizing education and pastoral industries, respectively. For the crest it has a tūī, with green and gold mantling. Motto: Fortuna Sequatur ("Let prosperity follow")	
Upper Hutt City Council		1978	College of Arms	Escutcheon: Argent a fess wavy azure (representing the Hutt River) between in chief two New Zealand pigeons (Hemiphaga novaeseelandiae) respectant and in base a tōtara tree (Podocarpus totara) couped proper. Crest: On a wreath of the colours in front of a rock a New Zealand falcon (Falco novaeseelandiae) standing on its nest all proper. Motto: Nihil altius pulchriusue ("Nothing higher nor more beautiful")	
Hutt City Council		1955	College of Arms	Escutcheon: Argent on water in base barry wavy a barquentine in full sail proper, flying at the fore-mast a flag azure, thereon a representation of the constellation of the southern cross or; on a chief vert a cog wheel between two garbs gold, over all a canton argent charged with a chevron between three fleurs de lys sable. Crest: A tūī bird holding in the beak a spring of kōwhai flowered proper. Supporters: On the dexter side the figure of a farmer supporting with the interior hand a long-handled shovel resting his exterior hand on a sheep dog sejant, and on the sinister side the figure of a Māori warrior vested proper, supporting with the interior hand a long spear also proper.	
Porirua City Council		1965	College of Arms	Escutcheon: Vert two piles barry wavy of ten argent and azure. Crest: On a wreath of the colours in front of a lymphad proper sail set pennon flying gules flags flying azure a whale proper. Supporters: On the dexter side a private soldier of the 58th Regiment of Foot in the uniform of the early nineteenth century and on the sinister side a Māori warrior both proper. Motto: Mo Te Katoa Nga Mahi ("All That is Done is For the Benefit of All")	
Wellington City Council		1878-1951	assumed	Escutcheon: Quarterly: 1st azure, out of a ducal crown or a demi-lion rampant gules holding in the paws a forked pennon flowing to the sinister, charged with the cross of St. George the ends gules (crest of the Duke of Wellington); 2nd argent, a galley with sails furled and oars and pennons sable; 3rd gules, a garb (a wheat or wheat sheaf) proper; 4th azure, a golden fleece proper cinctured gules. Crest: Mural crown or surmounted by a dolphin embowed azure (supremacy by naval position). Mantle, azure and gules. Supporters: Dexter, the British lion. Sinister, a moa but proper. Motto: Suprema a Situ ("Supreme by position"). Under the motto "1840" (date of the foundation of the City and Colony).	
Wellington City Council		1951	College of Arms	Escutcheon: Quarterly gules and azure, a cross or between; in the first quarter a fleece or; in the second quarter on water barry wavy proper in base a lymphad sail furled pennon and flags flying argent; in the third quarter a garb or; in the fourth quarter five plates in saltire argent. Crest: On a mural crown argent a dolphin naiant azure, mantled gules. Supporters: On the dexter side a lion gorged with a collar and chain reflexed over the back or, and on the sinister side a moa proper. Motto: Suprema a Situ ("Supreme by position")	
Marlborough District Council	Link to file	1958	College of Arms	Originally granted to the Blenheim Borough Council. The crest is a beaver (referencing the original name of the town of Blenheim) holding the banner used by the Dukes of Marlborough as quit-rent for Blenheim Palace. The shield of the arms is blue with a rising sun in the top half and two merino ram's heads on either side, representing the wool industry. In the bottom half of the shield are blue and white wavy lines representing the sea, surmounted by a cornucopia filled with various fruits. Motto: Industria et Perseverantia ("By Industry and Perseverance")	
Nelson City Council		1958	College of Arms	Escutcheon: Barry wavy argent and azure a cross flory sable on a chief also azure a mitre proper. Crest: On a wreath of the colours issuant from a mural crown proper a lion rampant gules holding between the fore paws a sun in splendour or. Supporters: The supporters on the dexter side a huia bird and on the sinister side a kōtuku both proper. Motto: Palmam qui meruit ferat ("Let him, who has earned it, bear the palm")	
Grey District Council	Link to file			The shield of coat of arms of the Grey District Council is red with a gold bordure, charged with a golden pick, shovel and axe (representing gold mining, coal mining and forestry in the area, respectively) all crossed. As supporters on either side of the shield are nīkau palms. The crest is a red ship (representing the Greymouth shipping port). Motto: Labore et honore ("By work and honour")	
Christchurch City Council		1922-1949	assumed	The shield of the 1922 Christchurch coat of arms depicts a chevron surrounded by symbols for agriculture (a sheep to the left, a sheaf of wheat above, a cow to the right, and a plough beneath) with a mining train coming out of a tunnel in the chief. For the crest it has a kiwi. For supporters it has two gryphons facing outwards and holding shields bearing the city's then motto across them. These were based on the stone figures which stood above the Oxford Terrace entrance of the Christchurch municipal chambers. They stand on a scroll which reads "CITY OF CHRISTCHURCH 1850". Motto: Britons hold your own	
Christchurch City Council		1949	College of Arms	Main article: Coat of arms of the City of Christchurch Escutcheon: Or on a chevron gules a mitre between a fleece and a garb of the first in base two bars wavy azure on a chief of the last four lymphads sails furled also of the first. Crest: On a wreath or and azure a kiwi proper. Supporters: On either side a pūkeko proper. Motto: Fide Condita, Fructu Beata, Spe Fortis ("Founded in faith, rich in the fulfilment thereof, strong in hope for the future")	
Ashburton District Council		1966		Escutcheon: Argent on a fess wavy azure (representing Ashburton River / Hakatere) between in chief a mural crown gules between two trefoils slipped vert (taken from the arms of the Turton family) and in base a bear's head erased proper muzzled azure ringed gules (taken from the arms of Lord Ashburton) a Māori canoe or. Crest: On a wreath of the colours a garb quarterly vert and or banded gules charged with a ram's head caboshed proper. Supporters: The supporters on both sides are pied stilts. Motto: Fides Probata Coronat ("Faith Confirms What Has Been Proved Good and True" or "Faith Crowns True Actions")	
Timaru District Council		1977	College of Arms	Escutcheon: Per chevron azure and argent (representing Aoraki / Mount Cook) in chief two golden fleeces proper in base a plough azure, on a chief wavy, or, two lymphads sails furled and pennants flying from each main mast all gules. Crest: Upon a helm standing on the battlements of a mural crown argent, in front of a sun, or, rising therefrom a kiwi proper, mantled azure, doubled argent. Supporters: Two sea horses each gorged with a chain pendent therefrom a tau cross, azure. Compartment: Water barry, wavy, azure and argent. Motto: Palma non sine pulvere ("No Reward Without Effort", lit. 'palms not without dust')	
Queenstown-Lakes District Council	Link to file			The shield of the coat of arms of Queenstown-Lakes is divided into three parts per reverse pall. The top left section depicts a fleece (representing sheep farming and the wool industry), the top right depicts a pick and shovel (representing the history of gold-mining in the district), and the bottom section depicts the mountains of the area. Motto: Montium ex Umero Longius Videmus ("We see very far from the shoulder of the mountain")	
Dunedin City Council		1947	Lord Lyon King of Arms	Escutcheon: Argent above a fess dancette vert, a castle triple-towered sable on a rock issuing from the fess, masoned argent, with windows, vanes and portcullis gules. In the base a three-masted lymphad with sail furled azure, flagged of Scotland, a ram's head affrontee horned or between two garbs of the last. Crest: A mural crown. Supporters: On the dexter a Scotsman habited with philabeg and plaid of the Clan Cameron, supporting in his exterior hand a cromach; on the sinister a Māori chief attired in korowai (waist mat), two huia feathers in his hair, an aurei (greenstone ear pendant) and a hei matau (greenstone neck pendant) and in his exterior hand a taiaha. Motto: Maiorum Institutis Utendo ("By following in the steps of our forefathers")	
Invercargill City Council		1958	Lord Lyon King of Arms	Escutcheon: Or, on three bars wavy gules a ram's head horned affrontee proper, on a chief wavy azure a lymphad argent, flagged gules between two garbs or. Crest: A mural crown argent. Supporters: On either side a takahē proper. Motto: Pro Communi Utilitate ("For the Use of the Community")	
Southland District Council	Link to file	1991		The shield of the arms of the Southland District Council is blue and charged with a white saltire for Saint Andrew splitting the shield into four sections. In the top section is a white ram's head, in the left section there is a black key and black quill crossed over each other, in the right section there is a pellet, and in the bottom there is a white circular object with white wavy lines above and below it. For the crest it has a mural crown. For supporters, on the left it has a kākāpō while on the right it has a kiwi, both standing on a green mound covered in ferns representing the Fiordland National Park. Motto: Service. Commitment. Enterprise.	
Southland Regional Council		1983	Lord Lyon King of Arms	Originally granted to the Southland United Council, precursor to Southland Regional Council. Escutcheon: Quarterly, first, or, on a reedy mount vert a notornis bird proper, beaked and membered gules (for Southland); second, gules, a dexter arm vambraced, the hand brandishing a sword proper (for Wallace); third, azure, three piles wavy issuant from the dexter bendways argent (for Fiordland); fourth, or, an island vert surmounted of a fess chequy azure and argent (for Stewart Island). Supporters: Dexter a merino ram and sinister a merino ewe proper. Motto: Above the shield in an escrol murrey in letters or is placed this motto "SOUTHLAND", and on a compartment vert below the shield, along with an escrol argent bearing in letters sable this motto "IN UNITY WE PROGRESS".	

==== Former ====
Arms of former local authorities in New Zealand (non-exhaustive)
Local authority	Image	Date adopted	Heraldic authority	Blazon / Description	Ref.
Auckland City Council		1911-2010	College of Arms	Escutcheon: Argent, upon waves of the sea a two-masted ship in full sail proper flagged gules, on a chief per pale azure and gules to the dexter a cornucopia or, to the sinister a shovel surmounted by a pick, in saltire proper. Crest: Issuant out of a mural crown or a representation of the Phormium tenax flowered proper. Supporters: On either side an Apteryx (or kiwi) proper. Motto: Advance.	
Waitakere City Council		1973-2010	College of Arms	Originally the arms of the Waitemata County Council. Escutcheon: Per pall reversed azure and argent on a chevron engrailed or and sable between in chief a bunch of grapes slipped and leaved argent, and a tower gules and in base a bulls head caboshed sable, armed and ringed of five ermine spots counterchanged. Crest: On a mural crown or masoned vert, an arm couped bendwise habited in a maunch sable bezanty each bezant charged with an ermine spot sable, cuffed ermine lined gules, the hand proper supporting an orb vert banded and ensigned with a cross crosslet or, mantled sable doubled or. Motto: Te Pai Me Te Whairawa ("The Goodness and the Wealth")	
Manukau City Council		1968-2010	College of Arms	Escutcheon: Azure on a chevron or between in chief two seagulls volant and respectant proper in base a lymphad sail set pennon and flags flying or a bull's head caboshed sable armed proper between two cogwheels sable. Crest: On a wreath or and gules perched on battlements of a tower proper in front of an aeroplane propeller or a seagull wings elevated proper. Motto: Ante Alios Prosili ("Be ahead of the times")	
Howick Borough Council		1955-1989	assumed	The shield of the coat of arms of Howick is blue with a white "medieval ship" (representing the ship Minerva) and white and blue bands representing the sea in the base. In the chief on a white background is a depiction of a well on the left, and a cannon on the right. The symbols were intended to represent the Fencibles and their families, as the first European settlers in the area, and Howick's establishment as a military settlement. For the crest it had a golden scallop shell (the emblem of Saint James). Motto: To Serve With Good Will (The motto of Sir Henry George Grey, Viscount Howick)	
Birkenhead Borough Council		1983–1989	College of Arms	The coat of arms of Birkenhead Borough Council contained references to the arms of the Borough of Birkenhead in Cheshire, England. The shield is black charged with a red-edged silver cross moline between four silver kauri sprigs with golden cones. For the crest it has a white lion holding a taiaha, and for the supporters it has two tūī with silver estoiles by their claws inspired by the coat of arms of Captain James Cook. Motto: Tuituia mai tatou ("Let us all be united")	
New Plymouth City Council	Link to file	1941-1989	assumed	The shield of the coat of arms of New Plymouth is divided into quarters, separated by a blue cross bordered with white and surmounted with five stars also arranged in a cross. The top left quarter depicts a Jersey cow in a field. The top right quarter depicts a berthed merchant vessel. The bottom left quarter depicts a green hei-tiki on a brown background. The bottom right quarter depicts New Plymouth Airport, Mount Taranaki and the Southern Cross monoplane. Behind the shield are depictions of four traditional Māori weapons: a taiaha in the top left, a hoe (paddle) in the lower left, a ko-a (digging implement) in the top right, and a tewhatewha in the lower right. Motto: Mauri Mahi Mauri Ora ("The Industrious Heart Lives")	
Hastings City Council		1956-1989	College of Arms	The coat of arms for the city of Hastings was inspired by the coat of arms of Hastings, England. Escutcheon: Per pale argent and vert a lion passant guardant dimidiated with the hulk of a ship between two lions passant guardant in pale within an orle of fern all counterchanged. Crest: On a wreath of the colours a kiwi proper beaked or between two branches of yellow kōwhai flowered also proper. Supporters: On the dexter side a ram and on the sinister side a Māori holding in the exterior hand a taiaha proper. Motto: Urbis Et Ruris Concordia ("Town and Country in Harmony")	
Havelock North Borough Council		1952-1989		Escutcheon: Per chevron or and vert in chief an open book proper bound gules between two lymphads sails furled oars in saltire before the mast sable pennon and flags flying gules in base a cross crosslet fitchy or. Crest: On a wreath of the colours is a sea horse sejant or holding between the fins a cross crosslet fitchy or. Motto: Serviamus ("Let us serve")	

=== Personal arms ===
Coat of arms of New Zealand Herald of Arms Extraordinary Phillip O'Shea

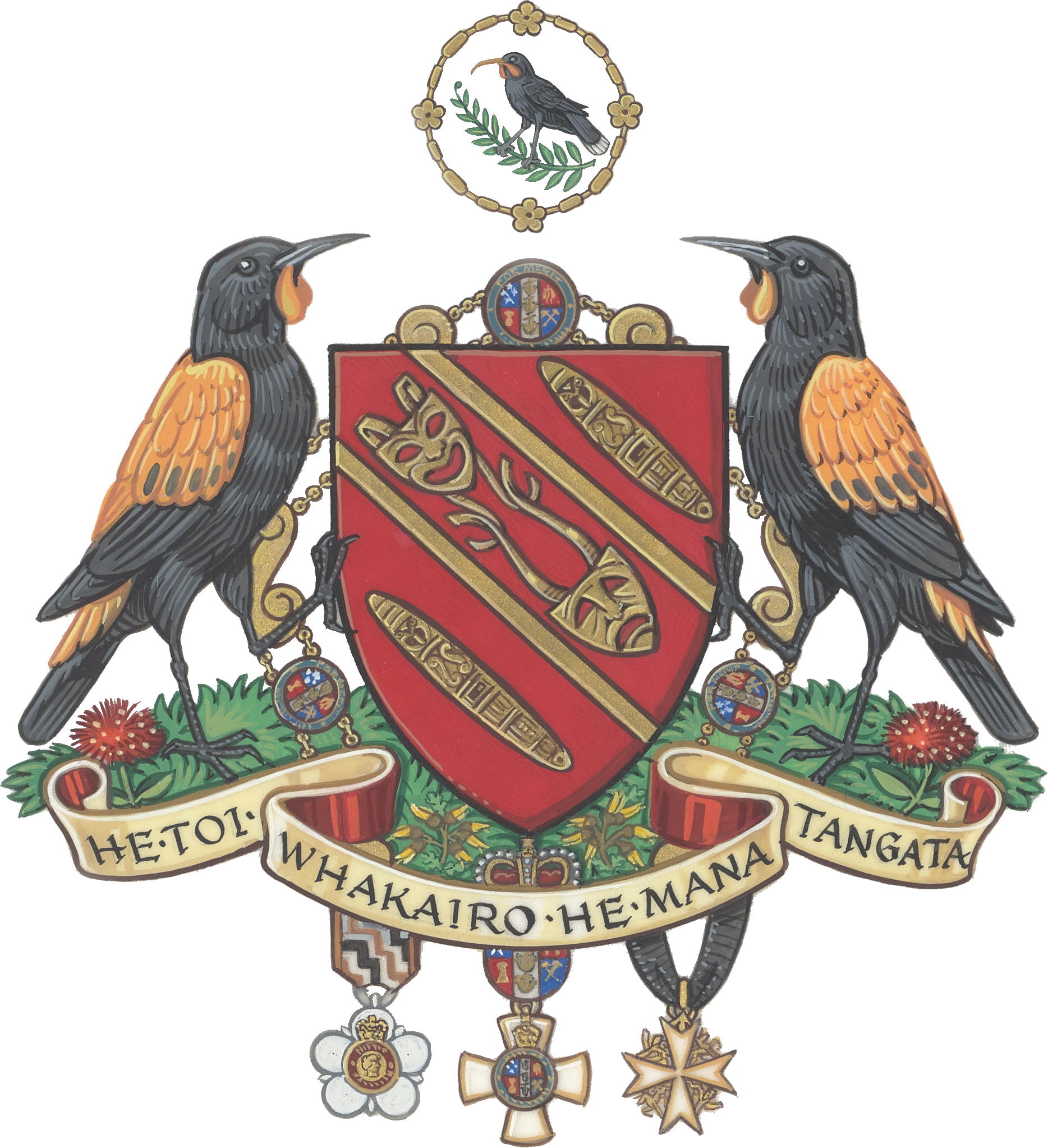
Coat of arms of former Governor-General Dame Patsy Reddy

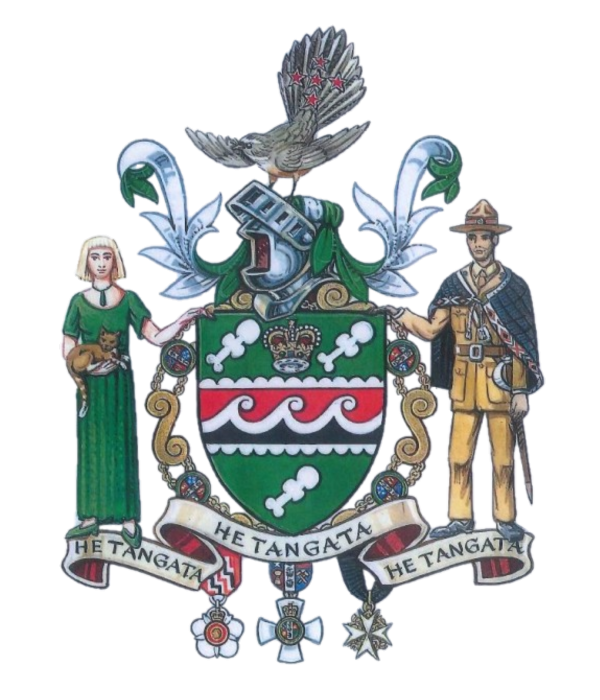
Coat of arms of former Governor-General Sir Jerry Mateparae

Coat of arms of former Governor-General Sir Michael Hardie Boys

Coat of arms of former Governor-General Dame Catherine Tizard

Coat of arms of former Prime Minister and Governor-General Sir Keith Holyoake

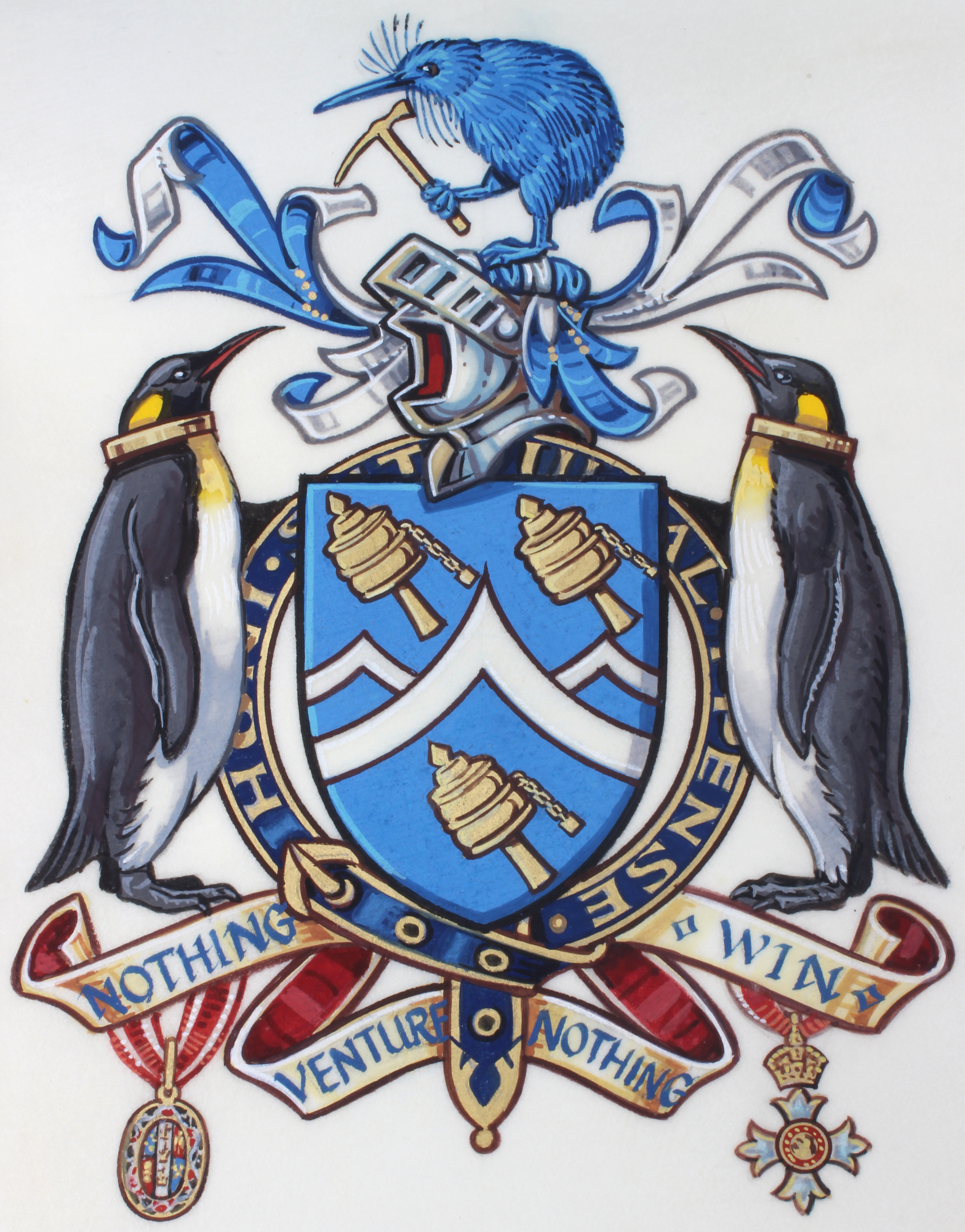
Coat of arms of mountaineer, explorer, and philanthropist Sir Edmund Hillary

Coat of arms of physicist Ernest Lord Rutherford

Coat of arms of the Kīngitanga

=== Corporate/Institutional arms ===
Some New Zealand corporations and institutions have their own coats-of-arms, including several New Zealand universities such as University of Auckland, Massey University, the University of Waikato, and the University of Otago.

Coat of arms of the Reserve Bank of New Zealand

Coat of arms of The New Zealand Herald newspaper

Coat of arms of the Bank of New Zealand

Coat of arms from the badge of the Heraldry Society of New Zealand

Armiger	Image	Date adopted	Granted by	Blazon / Description	Ref.
Universities
University of Otago		1948	Lord Lyon King of Arms	Escutcheon: Azure, on a saltire cantoned between four mullets of six points or, a book, gilt-edged and bound in a cover gules charged with a mullet of six points of the second and a book-marker of the third issuant from the page-foot. Motto: Sapere aude ("Dare to be wise")	
University of Canterbury		1965	College of Arms	Escutcheon: Murrey a fleece argent, in base a plough or, and on a chief wavy or an open book proper bound murrey, edged and clasped or between a pall azure charged with four crosses formy fitchy or and a cross flory azure.	
Lincoln University		1940	assumed (Note: While the design was approved by the College of Arms in London, Lincoln University did not officially register the arms as they considered the cost to be prohibitive.)	The coat of arms of Lincoln University consists of a navy blue shield with a white chief and white chevron. The chief is charged in the centre with a cross and bishops’ pallia on either side, all in red. In between the chief and the chevron are a ram's head on the left and an ox's head on the right, both gold. The middle of the chevron is charged with a golden mortar and pestle, while a golden sheaf of wheat is in the base. The charges in the chief were taken from the arms of the Canterbury Province, whereas the rest of the charges were inspired by the seal of the Canterbury Agricultural College. Motto: Scientia et Industria cum Probitate ("Science and Industry with Integrity")	
University of Auckland		1962	College of Arms	Escutcheon: Azure between three mullets argent an open book proper edged and bound or with seven clasps on either side gold, on a chief wavy also argent, three kiwis proper. Motto: Ingenio et labore ("By natural ability and hard work")	
Victoria University of Wellington		1903	assumed	Escutcheon: Vert on a fesse engrailed between three crowns or, a canton azure charged with four estoilles argent (in the form of the Southern Cross). In 1992 the design of the arms were updated in consultation with the College of Arms, with the crest (that of the Duke of Wellington) removed and supporters added. The supporters are the stylized head of a lion on the dexter side (inspired by the former crest), and a manaia on the sinister side, both facing outward. In 2019, as part of a re-branding effort, the university stopped using these arms in its official logo, replacing it with a different shield shaped logo. Motto: Sapienta Magis Auro Desideranda ("Wisdom is more to be desired than gold")	
Massey University		1967	College of Arms	Escutcheon: Gyronny of ten argent and azure a mullet gules fimbriated argent and irradiated or. Crest: On a wreath of the colours issuant from flames proper a ram's head argent horned and ensigned by the horns of the African long legged ram. Motto: Floreat scientia ("Let knowledge flourish'")	
University of Waikato	Link to file	1965	assumed	The coat of arms of the University of Waikato consists of a black shield with an open book in the centre surrounded by four gold stars representing the Southern Cross. In 1996, a golden bordure with a red pītau (fern frond) pattern was added to the shield. Motto: Ko Te Tangata ("For the People") (Note: Changed with the 1996 updates to the arms from the previous Latin motto Sapere est Iucundum ("There is joy in learning").)	

=== Ecclesiastical arms ===
Coat of arms of the Anglican Diocese of Auckland

Coat of arms of the Anglican Diocese of Waiapu

Coat of arms of the Diocese of Waikato and Taranaki

Coat of arms of the Anglican Diocese of Wellington

Coat of arms of the Anglican Diocese of Nelson

Coat of arms of the Anglican Diocese of Christchurch

Coat of arms of the Anglican Diocese of Dunedin

Coat of arms of the Anglican Diocese of Te Tai Tokerau

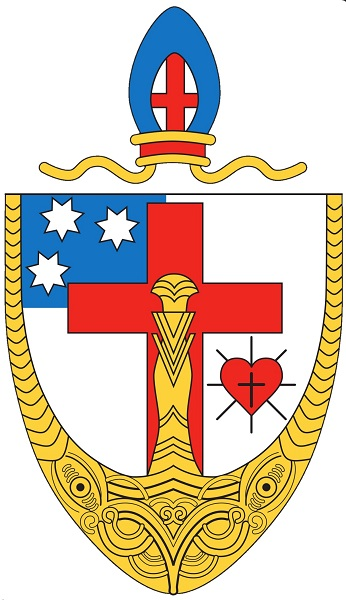
Coat of arms of the Anglican Diocese of Te Manawa o Te Wheke

Coat of arms of Paul Martin, 7th Roman Catholic Archbishop of Wellington

Coat of arms of Cardinal John Dew, archbishop emeritus of Wellington

Coat of arms of Cardinal Thomas Williams, archbishop emeritus of Wellington

== Badges ==
Badge of the New Zealand Herald Extraordinary

Badge of the Order of New Zealand

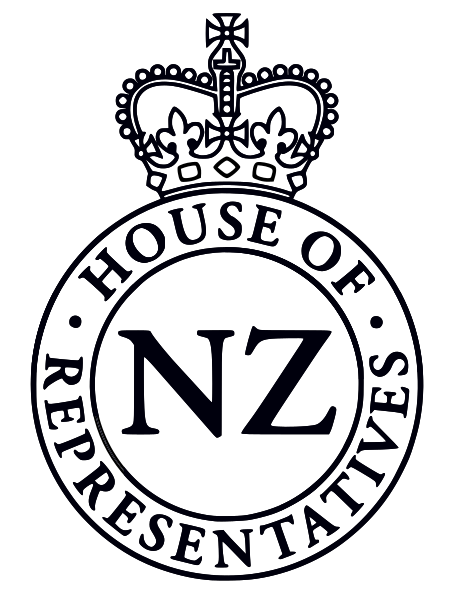
Badge of the New Zealand House of Representatives

Badge of the New Zealand Air Training Corps

Badge of the city of Wellington

== Heraldry of the Cook Islands, Niue and Tokelau ==
The other countries of the Realm of New Zealand, the associated states of the Cook Islands and Niue and the dependent territory of Tokelau, have their own heraldic emblems. The Cook Islands has their own armorial bearings (coat of arms) using unique local elements, since 2021 Niue has had a coat of arms based on traditional Niuean elements, while Tokelau has a badge based on a traditional Tokelauan tuluma.

Coat of arms of the Cook Islands

Coat of arms of Niue

The national badge of Tokelau

== Heraldry Society ==
Heraldry is discussed and studied by The Heraldry Society of New Zealand, a learned society under the patronage of the governor-general. The society publishes The New Zealand Armorist. Its homepage is called Onward.
