= List of museums in Niue =

Museums in Niue include:

- Hikulagi Sculpture Park
- Tāoga Niue Museum, in the capital, Alofi, which replaced the Huanaki Cultural Centre & Museum, which was destroyed by Cyclone Heta in 2004.
- Tahiono Gallery
