= Moira Enetama =

Museum director of Niue

Moira Zeta Enetama is a Niuean curator and cultural activist, who, as of 2021, was acting director of the Ministry of Social Services in Niue. She is also the Director of Tāoga Niue Museum. She is a former director of Taoga Niue, the governmental department that oversees cultural activities and preservation. During her directorship of Taoga Niue, Cyclone Heta destroyed Huanaki Cultural Centre & Museum, a disaster that Enetama described as "devastating". She has been outspoken on the benefit television can bring to ensure survival of the Niuean language.
