= Seal of Niue =

National seal

- Armiger: Charles III in Right of New Zealand
- Adopted: September 2021; 4 years ago
- Motto: Atua, Niue Tukulagi (God, Niue Eternally)

The Seal of Niue, or the Public Seal of Niue (Niuean: Fakamailoga faka-Fakatufono Niue), is the official seal of Niue. It was adopted in September 2021. The first version of the seal was created in 1974 when Niue gained self-governing status and joined into free association with New Zealand.

== History ==
Before 1974 Niue used the Coat of Arms of New Zealand. The Niue Constitution Act, passed in 1974, provided for the first unique seal to be created for Niue. The Seal was to be held by the Speaker of the Niue Assembly and was to be used to authenticate public documents or to affirm the creation of new laws by the Cabinet of Niue. The Speaker is also responsible for ensuring that the Seal is not misused. All judicial notices in Niue are affixed with the Seal. In 1977, after a request from the Niue Assembly, the Parliament of New Zealand passed the Seal of New Zealand Act with an amendment relating to Niue to bring the design of the Public Seal of Niue into line with the other nations in the Realm of New Zealand. Before 2007 the Seal of Niue was used in Tokelau to confirm the passage of legislation. In 2007 the Tokelau Amendment Act 2007 was passed, which replaced the use of the Seal of Niue in Tokelau and substituted it with "under the hand of the Administrator of Tokelau".

In 2016, the Tāonga Niuē Department issued a notice of a competition to design a coat of arms for Niue, to be used on a new public seal. This competition was won by Kenneth Green. Elements from Green's design were then used by Tāoga Niuē and the Vagahau Niue Commission in collaboration with the Niue Crown Law Office and New Zealand Mint, with consultation from New Zealand Herald Extraordinary Phillip O'Shea, to arrive at the final design. The new design for the public seal of Niue was signed off by Governor-general Patsy Reddy on 16 February 2021.

The Niuean Cabinet approved the new design for the Seal of Niue as per article 15 of the Niue Constitution, and the Niue Assembly passed an act for its use on 29 September 2021. However, this design had already been used on the obverse of non-circulating commemorative coins produced for Niue by the New Zealand Mint at least as early as 2019, as a substitute for the effigy of the late Queen Elizabeth II. It has continued to be used on coins issued since 2023 after the coronation of Charles III.

== Current design ==
The 2021 design consists of a crown (representing the sovereign as head of state), mounted on a blue outer circle in the form of a traditional Niuean garland of 14 seashells (representing the 14 villages of Niue). The outer circle surrounds a green inner circle of hiapo designs, representing the fonua (land), within which are stylised designs of a tree, representing life and tagata Niue (the people of Niue). This sits upon a scroll bearing the motto "Atua, Niue Tukulagi" (God, Niue Eternally) and two katoua (cleaving clubs), representing defence and security. Between the outer and inner circles are the words "Public Seal of Niue".

Niue's coat of arms is identical to the seal minus the words "Public Seal of Niue", with different monochrome versions in use by various offices, e.g. the Premier (gold), Cabinet (navy blue), Legislative Assembly (red), and Judiciary (black).

Coat of arms of Niue
Official coat of arms of Niue

Prime Minister's arms

Cabinet's arms

Niue Assembly's arms

Judiciary's arms

== The design of the 1974 seal ==
The seal used from 1974 to 2021

The 1974 design of the Seal of Niue had at its centre the coat of arms of New Zealand, which is a shield divided into quarters. In the first quarter is the constellation of the Southern Cross, in the second a golden fleece, a sheaf of wheat in the third, and two crossed hammers in the fourth. Over the four-quarters in the centre appears a white band on which there are three black ships. The shield is supported by a woman dressed in a white robe carrying the flag of New Zealand, representing the population that descended from European immigrants (mainly British), and a Māori warrior armed with a taiaha, representing the indigenous population. At the head of the shield is a crown, and at the foot of the shield is a ribbon with the words "New Zealand". The seal was on a white circle, with "Public Seal of Niue" along the top, and "Niue" at the bottom.

== See also ==
- Flag of Niue
- Seal of New Zealand
