= Tāoga Niue Museum =

National museum and cultural centre in Alofi, Niue

Coordinates: 19.05220°S 169.9214°W

- Predecessor: Huanaki Cultural Centre & Museum
- Formation: 2018
- Headquarters: Alofi
- Director: Moira Enetama

Tāoga Niue Museum is a national museum and cultural centre located in Alofi, Niue. It replaced the Huanaki Cultural Centre & Museum, which was destroyed by Cyclone Heta in 2004.

== Background ==
In 2004 Cyclone Heta hit Niue, damaging much of the capital, Alofi. Damage included the destruction of the Huanaki Cultural Centre & Museum building, and the loss of between 90–95% of the collection. Restoration of the museum and cultural preservation was recognised as an important aspect of the Government of Niue's strategic plan 2009–13. Construction for the new museum began in 2018, funded with a US$2.7 million grant from the New Zealand government. The new museum opened in October 2018. The opening coincided with Niue's celebrations of its constitution, which, for the first time, were held at a location away from parliament at the new museum.

The museum includes an auditorium, cafe, storage facility and stage, as well as a display space. In 2019 the museum hosted an exhibition as part of the Taoga Niue Festival.

== Collections ==
Following Cyclone Heta, between 5–10% of the museum collection was salvaged. Salvaged objects included those relating to Niue and the First World War, including photographs and a uniform, as well as examples of weaving from Niue. Objects that were lost included two fragments of Niuean throwing stones. Director of Taoga Niue, the governmental department overseeing cultural activities, Moira Enetama, described the situation as "not only a loss of material culture but a loss of belongingness, the ownership, the head and the intangible heritage of Niue".

In 2005 the museum also began to rebuild its collection, which now includes award-winning woven hats that were displayed in New Zealand. Museum staff also scavenged rubbish dumps across the island for objects that would help to rebuild the collection. One example were hand woven fishnets, the craft of which is no longer practiced in Niue. The museum also travelled to all areas of the islands buying objects from traditional artists. MP Va'aiga Tukuitonga recognised the urgency in updating the collection, as well as preserving cultural knowledge held in Niue, which has an aging population.

=== Overseas collections ===
A significant amount of Niue's cultural and scientific heritage is held in collections overseas. One of the most common items in overseas collections are hiapo – traditional woven barkcloths specific to Niue.

Te Papa holds 291 objects from Niue: the earliest object in their collection is a Niuean maka (throwing stone), which was presented in 1869 by Rev. John Inglis. The British Museum's Niuean collection includes clubs, barkcloth, money, and other items. Perth Art Gallery in Scotland holds two wooden spears from Niue. Glasgow Museums holds a fishing line made from human hair, as well as model canoes and other objects. The Horniman Museum holds barkcloth, a noseflute, spears and other objects. The Australian Museum holds the type specimens for Niue's only endemic butterfly Nacaduba niueensis (Niue Blue).

==== Repatriation ====
From 2016, the museum expressed its intention to request the repatriation of objects that are held in overseas collections. In 2007 Auckland War Memorial Museum returned the skull of an islander that was in its collection to community representatives in Auckland. The remains were taken to a Niuean church, then subsequently re-buried in Niue.

==== Gallery of Niuean objects in overseas collections ====
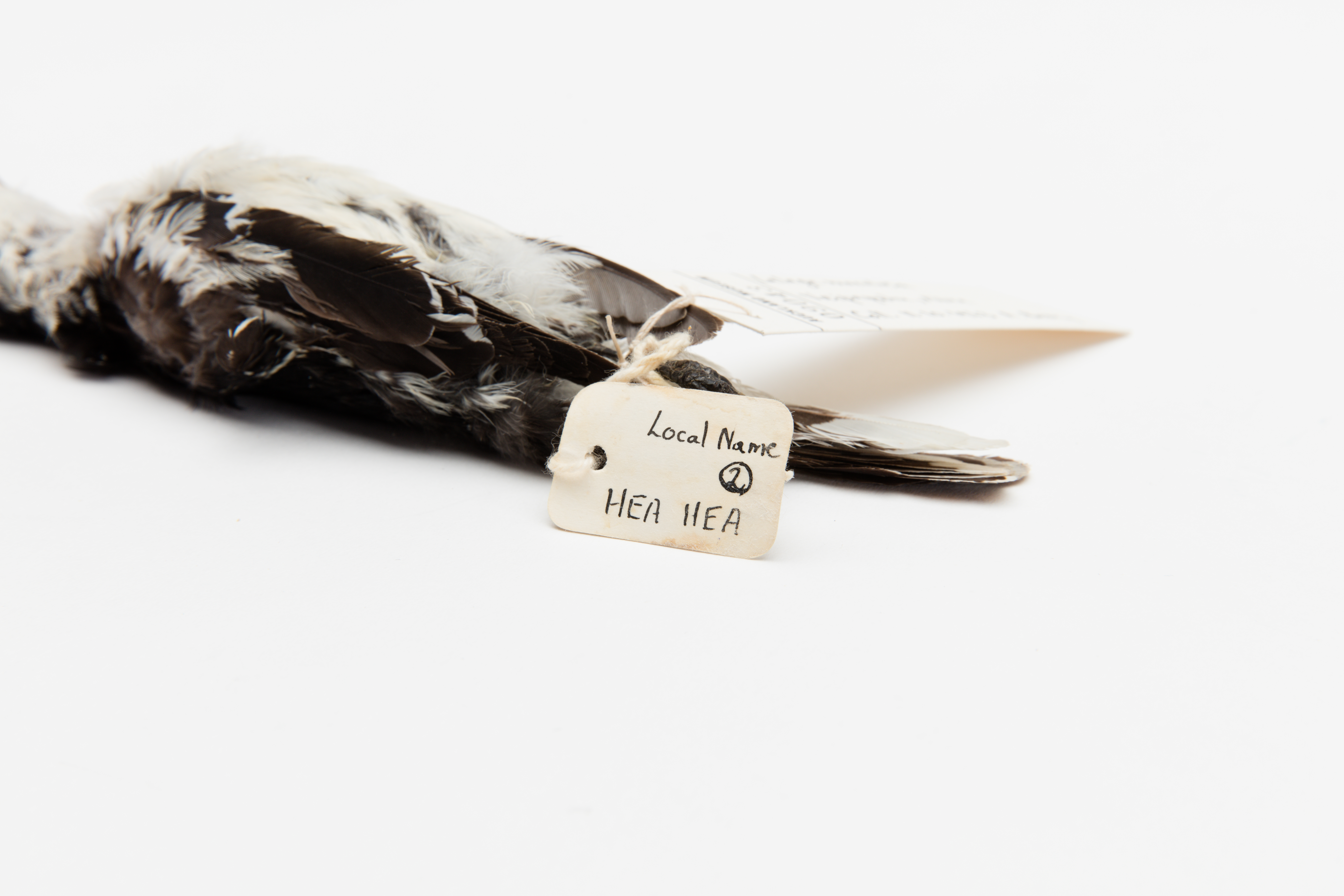
Hea hea (Auckland Museum)

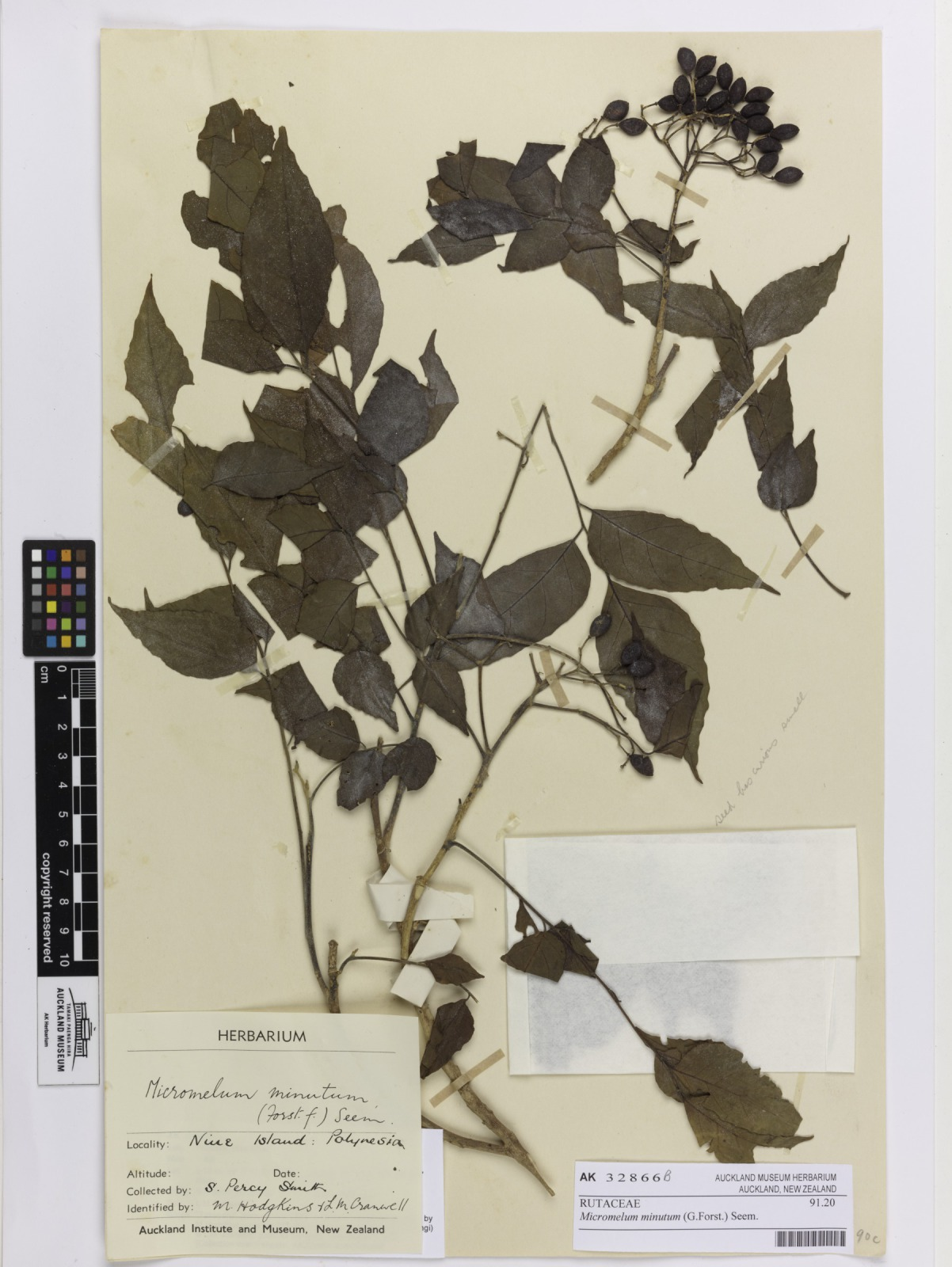
Micromelum minutum (Auckland Museum)

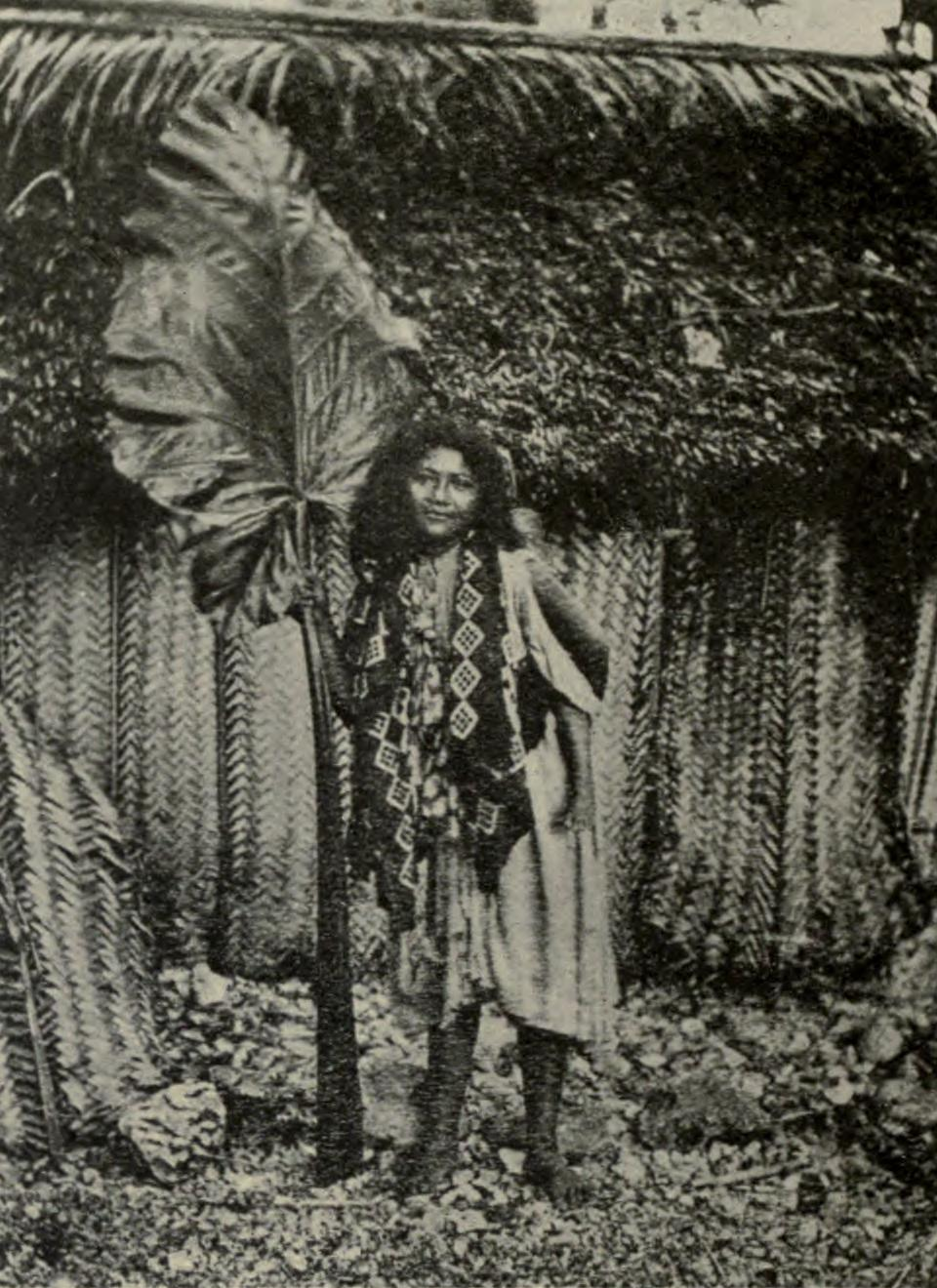
Photograph of woven house walls (Bishop Museum)

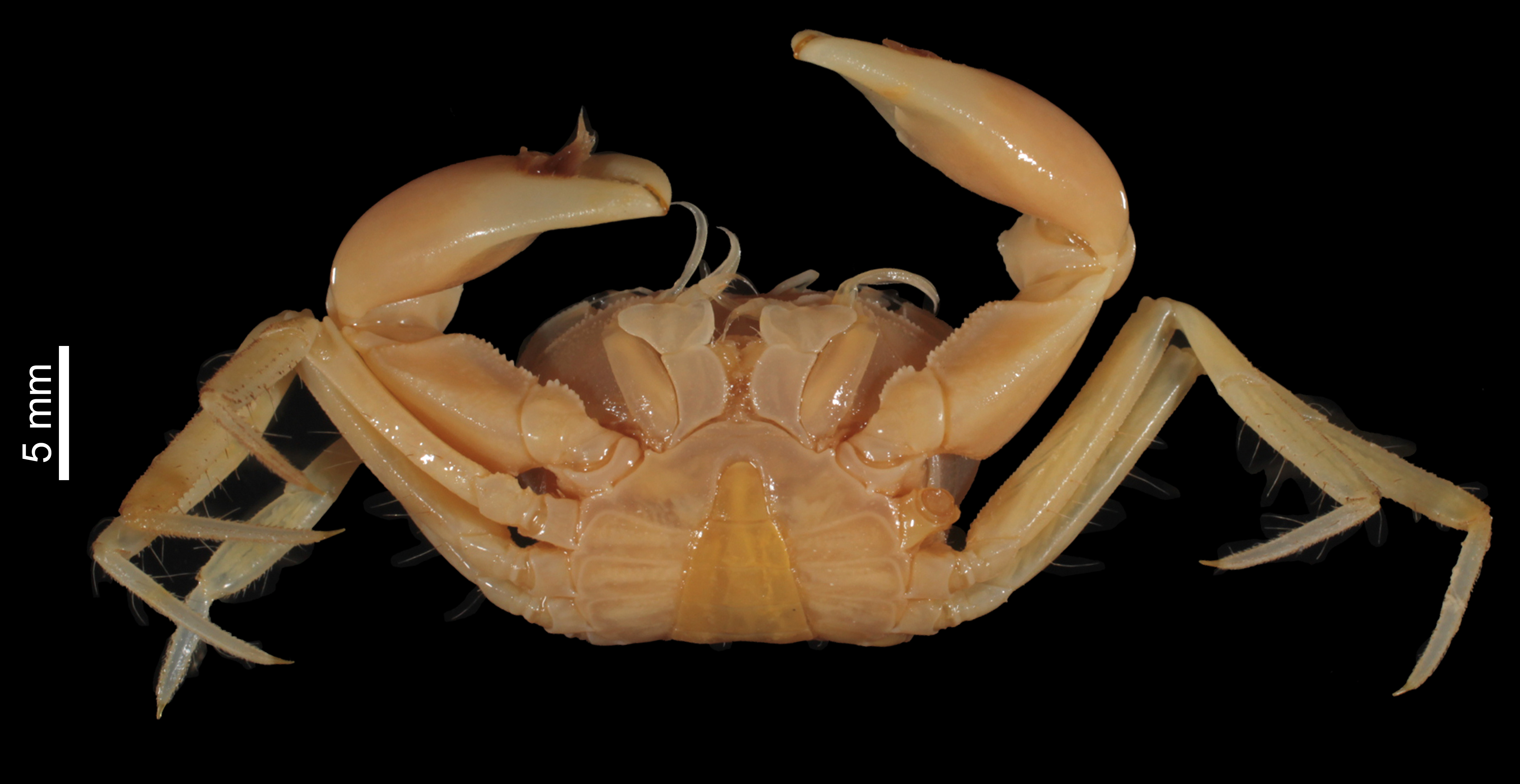
Orcovita gracilipes (Muséum national d'Histoire naturelle)
