= Tūranganui River (Gisborne) =

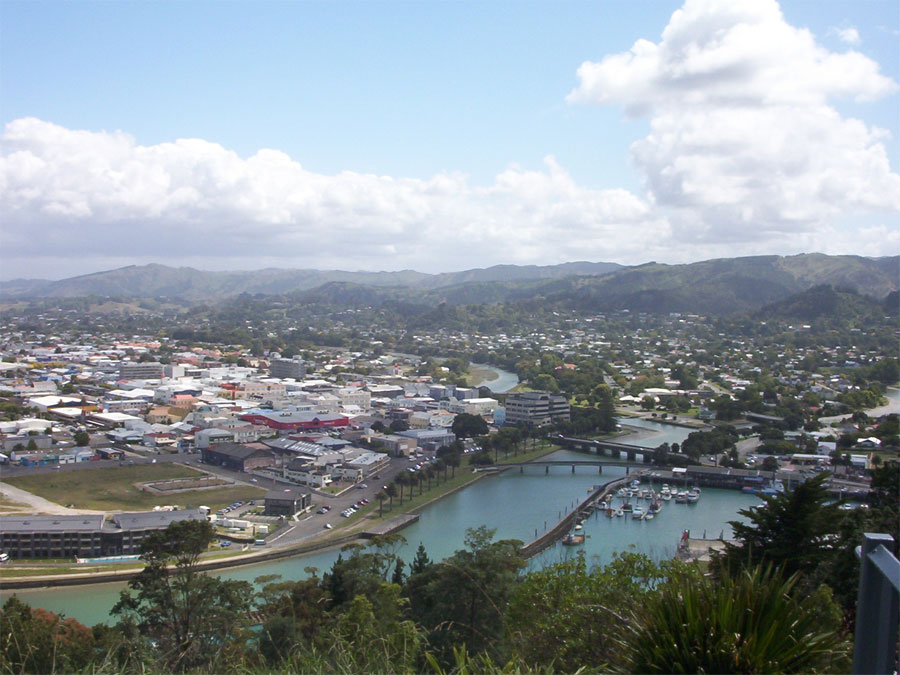
- This photo from Kaiti Hill shows more than half of the Tūranganui River. The confluence of the Taruheru and Waimata is visible on the right upstream of the road bridge.
- Route of the Tūranganui River
- Mouth of the Tūranganui River Tūranganui River (Gisborne) (North Island)
- Native name: Taruheru (Māori)

Location
- Country: New Zealand
- Island: North Island
- Region: Gisborne

Physical characteristics
- Source: confluence of Taruheru River and Waimata River
  - location: Gisborne
  - coordinates: 38.6673°S 178.0297°E
- Mouth: Tūranganui River
  - location: Gisborne
  - coordinates: 38°40′27″S 178°01′22″E
  - elevation: 0 m (0 ft)
- Length: 1.2 km (0.75 mi)

Basin features
- Progression: Tūranganui River → Poverty Bay → Pacific Ocean
- Tributaries
  - right: Waikanae Creek
- Bridges: Gladstone Road Bridge, Tūranganui River Railway Bridge

The Tūranganui River is a river in the city of Gisborne, New Zealand. Formed by the confluence of the Taruheru River and the Waimata River, it flows through downtown Gisborne to reach the Pacific Ocean at the northern end of Tūranganui-a-Kiwa / Poverty Bay. A memorial to the first landing place in New Zealand by Captain James Cook is located close to the mouth of the river. The entire river is tidal.

The Tūranganui River is sometimes referred to as the shortest river in the Southern Hemisphere. The Gisborne Harbour basin is separated from the river channel by a concrete breakwater.

The New Zealand Ministry for Culture and Heritage gives a translation of "great standing place" for Tūranganui.

== Environment ==
The water quality in this river is poor due to it being the drainage point for two very large catchments with various land uses. The fact that this river is tidal at this point improves water quality.

== Gallery ==
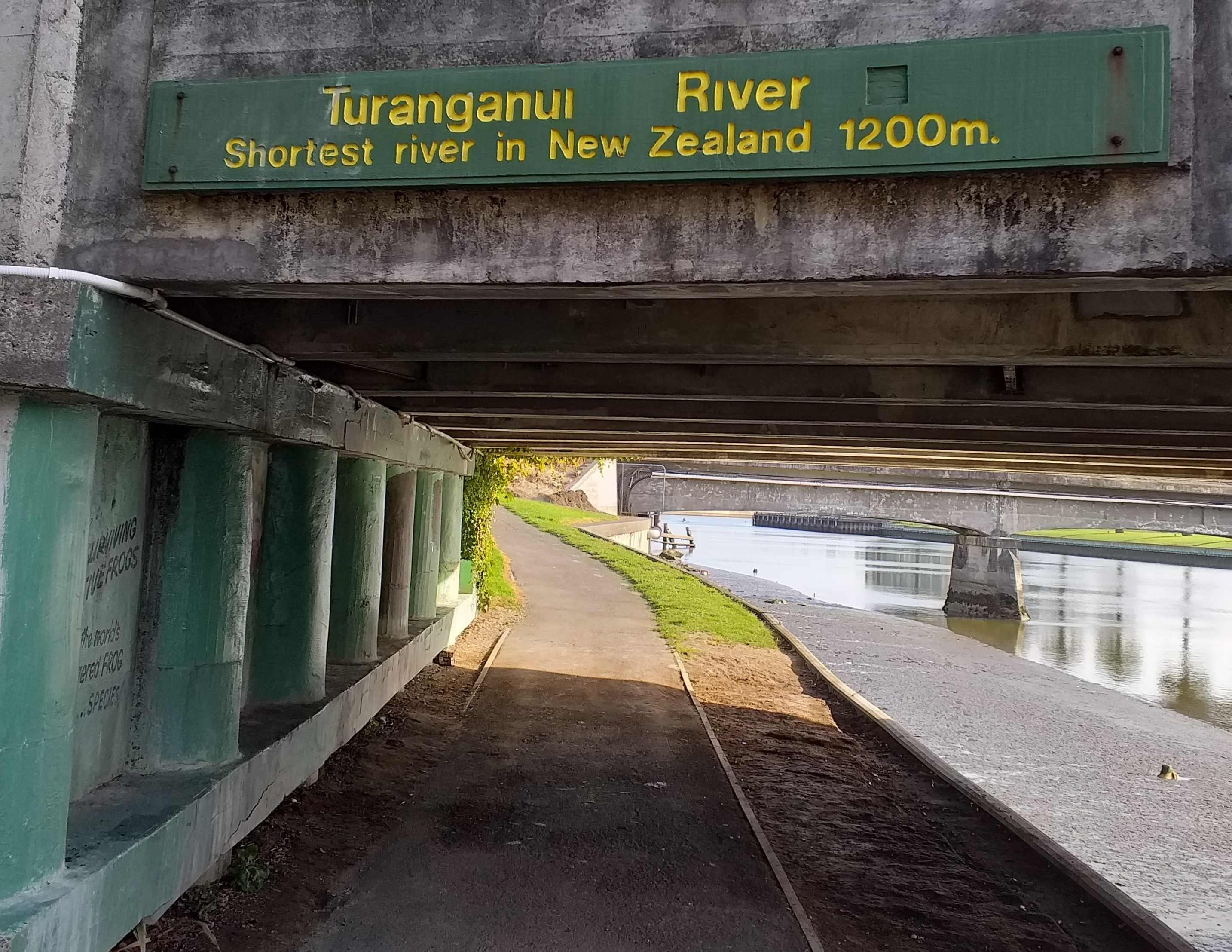
Tūranganui road bridge sign

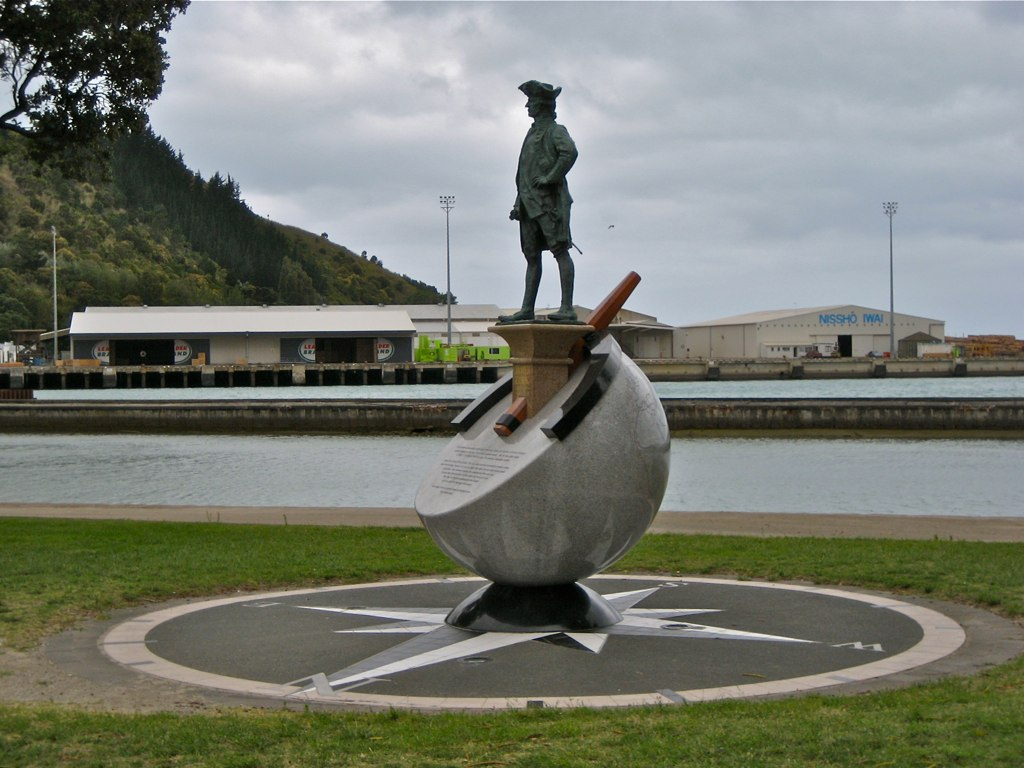
Captain Cook Statue near the mouth of the river

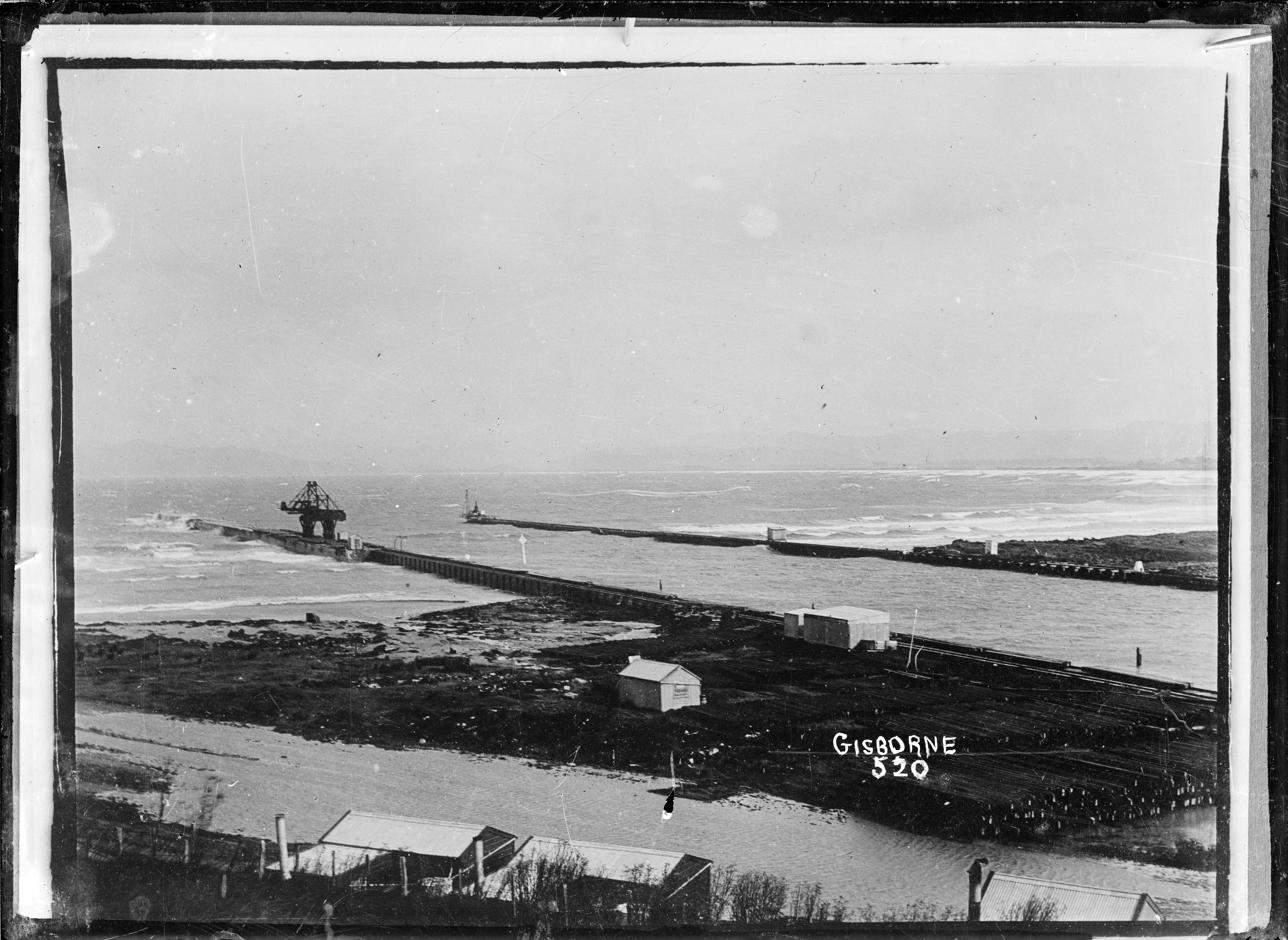
View of the river mouth c. 1910
