= New Zealand Herald Extraordinary =

Heraldic authority of New Zealand

- The heraldic badge of New Zealand Herald of Arms Extraordinary
- Heraldic tradition: Gallo-British
- Jurisdiction: New Zealand
- Governing body: College of Arms
- Chief officer: Phillippe Patrick O'Shea, New Zealand Herald of Arms Extraordinary

New Zealand Herald of Arms Extraordinary is an officer of arms representing the heraldic interests of New Zealand. Although affiliated with the College of Arms in London, the New Zealand Herald lives and works in New Zealand, and is not a member of the College Chapter. The current New Zealand Herald of Arms Extraordinary is Phillip O'Shea.

== Historical background ==
Consideration was given in 1975 to establishing an independent heraldic authority in New Zealand. In particular there were proposals for a new provincial king of arms, titled New Zealand King of Arms, to be under the Earl Marshal and Garter Principal King of Arms. This would have been an officer of arms in ordinary and a part of the corporation of the College of Arms. It was decided however to continue to use the College of Arms.

On 6 February 1978, Phillip Patrick O'Shea was appointed as the first New Zealand Herald of Arms Extraordinary to Queen Elizabeth II. The appointment was made by royal warrant of the Queen of New Zealand addressed to the Earl Marshal of England. Having been accomplished in this way, New Zealand Herald's appointment was unlike other extraordinary heralds and more akin to that of officers of arms in ordinary. The warrant of appointment has not been published in the New Zealand Gazette.

== Heraldic duties ==
Unlike some other Commonwealth countries with their own local heraldic authorities, armorial ensigns in New Zealand continue to be granted by the Kings of Arms of the College of Arms in London. New Zealand Herald of Arms Extraordinary has no autonomous power to grant arms. However, New Zealand Herald of Arms Extraordinary advises the New Zealand Government on heraldic matters, represents the College of Arms in New Zealand, is deputy in that country to Garter Principal King of Arms, and is ex officio a member of the Royal Household. The current New Zealand Herald Extraordinary was also appointed the Herald of the New Zealand Order of Merit on its institution in 1996.

Since the creation of the office of New Zealand Herald of Arms Extraordinary in 1978, letters patent issued through by the College of Arms to New Zealanders have de-emphasised their English character. Thus, the Earl Marshal is simply noted as "Earl Marshal" rather than "Earl Marshal and Hereditary Marshal of England". In the same way, the Queen's New Zealand royal style has been used rather than that of the United Kingdom.

The appointment of New Zealand Herald of Arms Extraordinary does not affect the jurisdiction of the Lord Lyon King of Arms to grant coats of arms to citizens of New Zealand of Scottish descent or, to matriculate a coat of arms in favour of a New Zealand petitioner where they have a right of succession to those arms or a differenced version of that coat of arms.

== Ceremonial duties ==
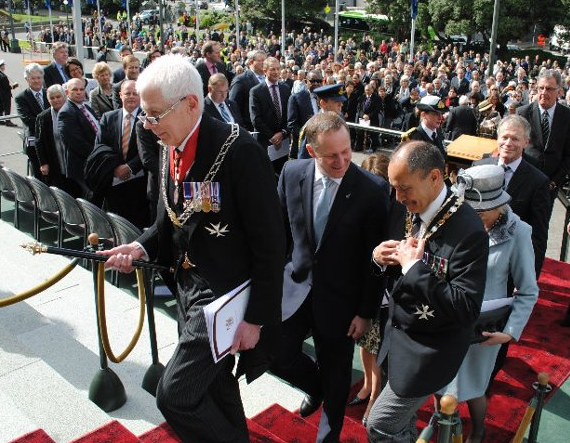
New Zealand Herald of Arms Extraordinary Phillip O’Shea leads then Prime Minister John Key and a newly sworn in Governor-General Sir Jerry Mateparae up the steps of Parliament.

The New Zealand Herald of Arms Extraordinary attends the Governor-General (or the Sovereign, if present) on ceremonial occasions which include the swearing-in of a new Governor-General, investitures of Royal honours, and the ceremonial opening of Parliament. Since at least 2002 the New Zealand Herald of Arms Extraordinary has been the person appointed by the Governor-General to proclaim the dissolution of Parliament.

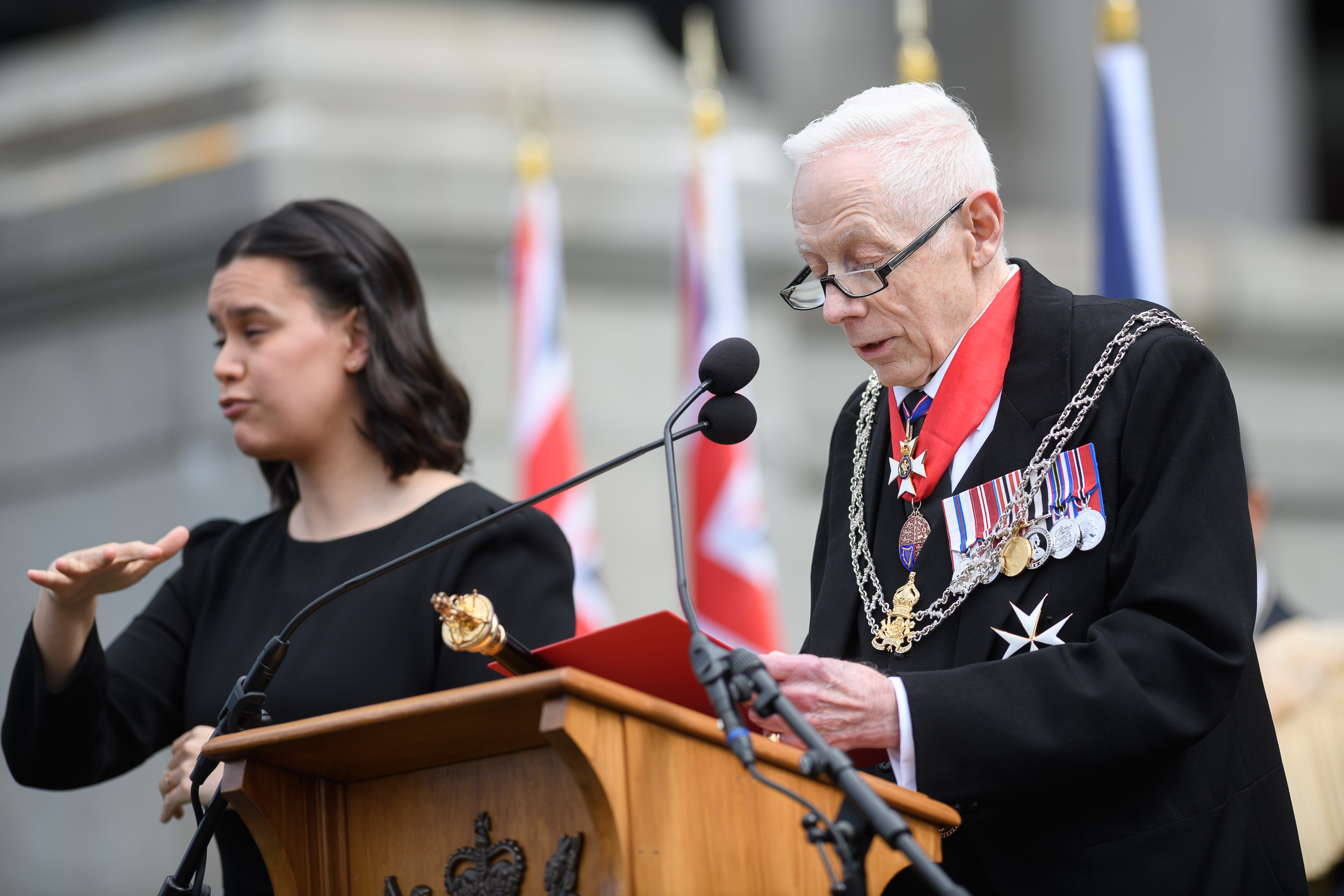
New Zealand Herald of Arms Extraordinary, Phillip O’Shea, reads the proclamation of accession of Charles III

At a ceremony held on the steps of Parliament on 11 September 2022, Herald of Arms Extraordinary Phillip O’Shea was the one to read out the proclamation of accession for King Charles III in English.

When performing duties the New Zealand Herald of Arms Extraordinary wears morning dress together with the chains of office and holding a herald's baton. The tabard of the Royal Arms is only worn at ceremonial occasions when in England together with the other heralds; the most recent occasion being at the Thames Diamond Jubilee Pageant in 2012.

== Badge of office ==
The badge of office of New Zealand Herald of Arms Extraordinary is blazoned:

A complex Māori Koru coloured in the traditional manner proper (white, red ochre and black) ensigned by a representation of the Royal Crown also proper.

The badge is intended to represent the heraldic, genealogical and ceremonial roles of the Herald of Arms Extraordinary, as well as their role as a personal officer to the monarch.

The koru design is used to decorate the rafters of Māori meeting houses, where important ceremonies take place, and it is also found on a number of objects at these ceremonial gatherings. The loops and coils of the koru also represent the complex Māori genealogical tree of the whakapapa. Māori genealogy is based for the most part on oral evidence and tradition, and in art the koru is used to represent this.

== Holders of the office ==
No.	Name	Image	Term of office		Monarch	Governor-General
1	Phillip O'Shea		6 February 1978	Incumbent	Elizabeth II	Holyoake
1	Phillip O'Shea		6 February 1978	Incumbent	Elizabeth II	Beattie
1	Phillip O'Shea		6 February 1978	Incumbent	Elizabeth II	Reeves
1	Phillip O'Shea		6 February 1978	Incumbent	Elizabeth II	Tizard
1	Phillip O'Shea		6 February 1978	Incumbent	Elizabeth II	Hardie Boys
1	Phillip O'Shea		6 February 1978	Incumbent	Elizabeth II	Cartwright
1	Phillip O'Shea		6 February 1978	Incumbent	Elizabeth II	Satyanand
1	Phillip O'Shea		6 February 1978	Incumbent	Elizabeth II	Mateparae
1	Phillip O'Shea		6 February 1978	Incumbent	Elizabeth II	Reddy
1	Phillip O'Shea		6 February 1978	Incumbent	Elizabeth II	Kiro
1	Phillip O'Shea		6 February 1978	Incumbent	Charles III	

== See also ==
- New Zealand heraldry
- The Heraldry Society of New Zealand
