= Huanaki Cultural Centre & Museum =

National museum and cultural centre in Alofi, Niue

- Formation: 1987
- Dissolved: 2004
- Purpose: Culture and heritage preservation
- Headquarters: Alofi, Niue

Huanaki Cultural Centre & Museum was a national museum and cultural centre in Alofi in Niue, which was destroyed in 2004 by Cyclone Heta.

== Background ==
In 1983 the government of Niue established the Niue Arts & History Project, which aimed to revive and foster pride in traditional customs and craft. The project hoped to enable the establishment of a cultural centre and museum and in 1985 the National Cultural Centre Project was set up.

The museum opened, as the first national museum for Niue, in 1987. It was opened by Sir Paul Reeves, who was the New Zealand Governor-General. It was part of the Department of Community Affairs & Culture. Its official opening was held on 19 October 1989. The centre included a museum, library and reading room, as well as an outdoor amphitheatre for performances, workshops for craftspeople, shops leased to private enterprises and a botanic garden. The museum was administered by the Cultural Affairs Officer, who was supported by a gardener, cleaner and two workers with expertise in Niuean culture. The programme ran a changing display programme, as well as cultural craft workshops for young people.

In the mid-1990s, the centre and museum were partners in the Niue Archaeological Project, led by Richard Walter from the University of Otago, and Atholl Anderson from the Australian National University. In 2003 the organisation received a grant of $20,000 from the World Heritage Fund in order to create a tentative World Heritage list for the country.

== Cyclone Heta ==
The museum building was destroyed in 2004 by Cyclone Heta. Between 90 and 95% of the museum's collection was also destroyed. The area surrounding the museum was still ruined in 2018. Other damage by the cyclone included deforestation, in particular of Dysoxylum forsteri, a tree used in the building of Niuean outrigger canoes.

In 2018, its replacement Tāoga Niue Museum opened, and its director is Moira Enetama.
