= Waimata River =

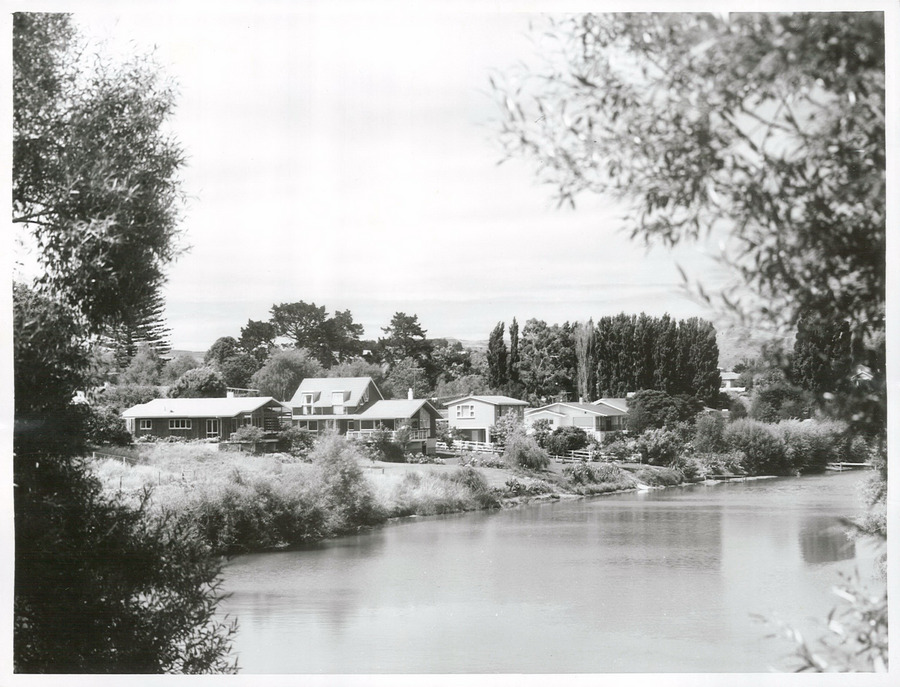
- Waimata River in Gisborne, 1971
- Route of the Waimata River
- Mouth of the Waimata River Waimata River (North Island)
- Native name: Waimata (Māori)

Location
- Country: New Zealand
- Island: North Island
- Region: Gisborne

Physical characteristics
- Source
  - coordinates: 38.44206°S 178.13301°E
- Mouth: Tūranganui River
  - location: Gisborne
  - coordinates: 38°40′03″S 178°01′48″E
- Length: 20 km (12 mi)

Basin features
- Progression: Waimata River → Tūranganui River → Poverty Bay → Pacific Ocean
- Tributaries
  - left: Mākahakaha Stream, Te Kōwhai Stream, Mangaorangi Stream, Te Pahi Stream, Mākahakaha Stream, Whainukota Stream, Kōpakiraho Stream
  - right: Kōkakonui Stream, Mangahoukū Stream, Mangaehu Stream, Horoweka Stream, Kareka Stream
- Bridges: Kenways Bridge, William Pettie Bridge

The Waimata River is a river of the Gisborne Region of New Zealand's North Island. It flows predominantly southwards to the city of Gisborne. Here it meets the waters of the Taruheru River, and the combined waters flow into the northern end of Poverty Bay as the Tūranganui River.

In the twenty-first century, concerns have arisen regarding the ecological state of the river, culminating in formation of a local grass-roots group (as part of the wider Te Awaroa movement) with the aim of restoring it to pristine condition.

== See also ==
- List of rivers of New Zealand
