= Taruheru River =

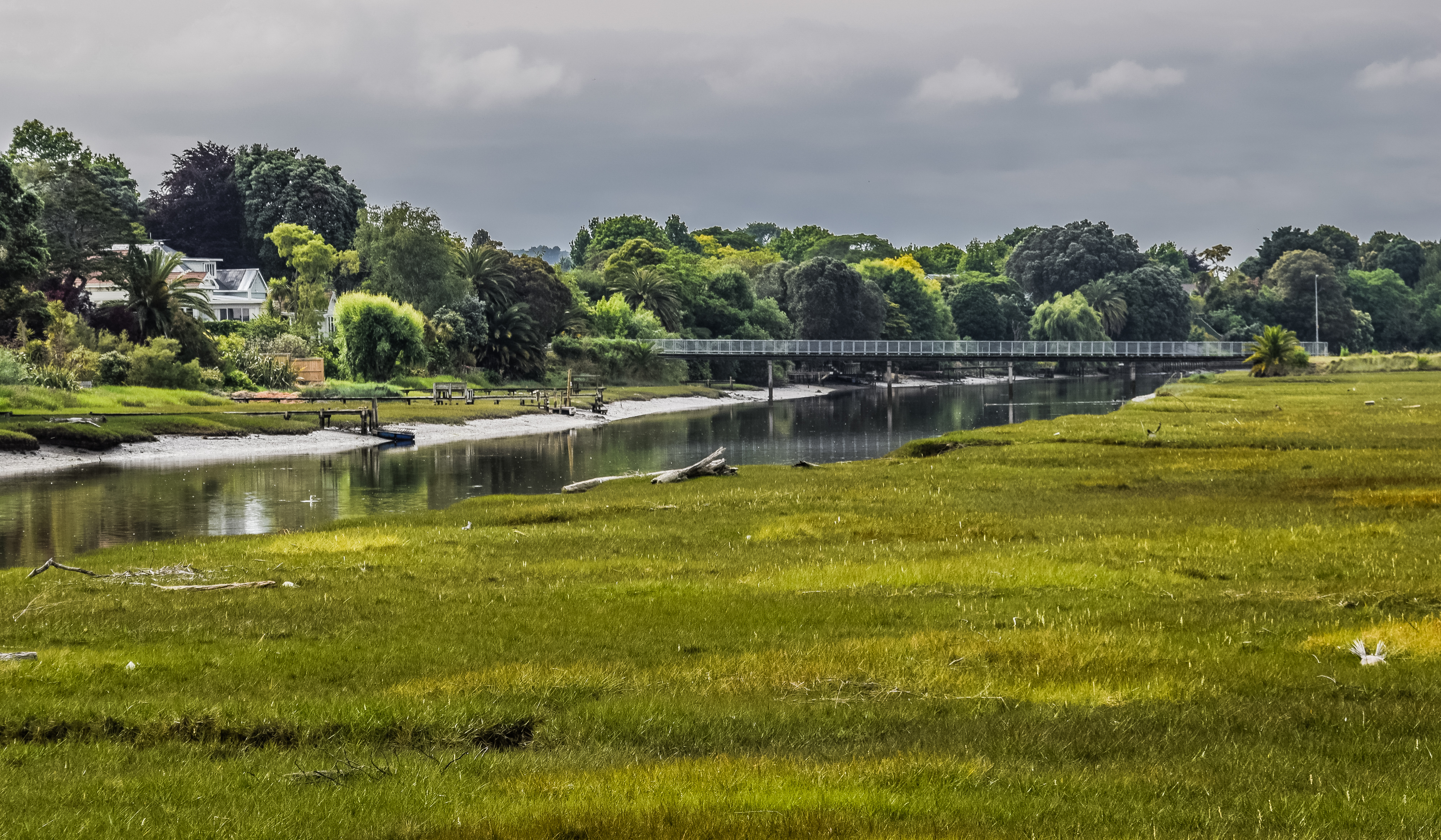
- Taruheru River seen from near the Gisborne Botanical Gardens
- Route of the Taruheru River
- Mouth of the Taruheru River Taruheru River (North Island)
- Native name: Taruheru (Māori)

Location
- Country: New Zealand
- Island: North Island
- Region: Gisborne

Physical characteristics
- Source: Confluence of Waihīrere Stream and Pōhatuhatununui Stream
  - location: Southwest of Waihīrere Domain
  - coordinates: 38.57325°S 177.94483°E
- Mouth: Tūranganui River
  - location: Gisborne
  - coordinates: 38°40′02″S 178°01′46″E

Basin features
- Progression: Taruheru River → Tūranganui River → Poverty Bay → Pacific Ocean
- Tributaries
  - left: Waru Stream, Mātokitoki Stream, Mangapapa Stream
  - right: Makaretū Stream, Mangamōteo Stream
- Bridges: Courtenays Bridge, Gordons Bridge, Peel Street Bridge

The Taruheru River is a river of the Gisborne Region of New Zealand's North Island. It flows predominantly southeast from sources close to the settlement of Ormond before flowing through the city of Gisborne. Here it meets the waters of the Waimata River, and the combined waters flow to the northern end of Poverty Bay as the Tūranganui River.

== Gallery ==
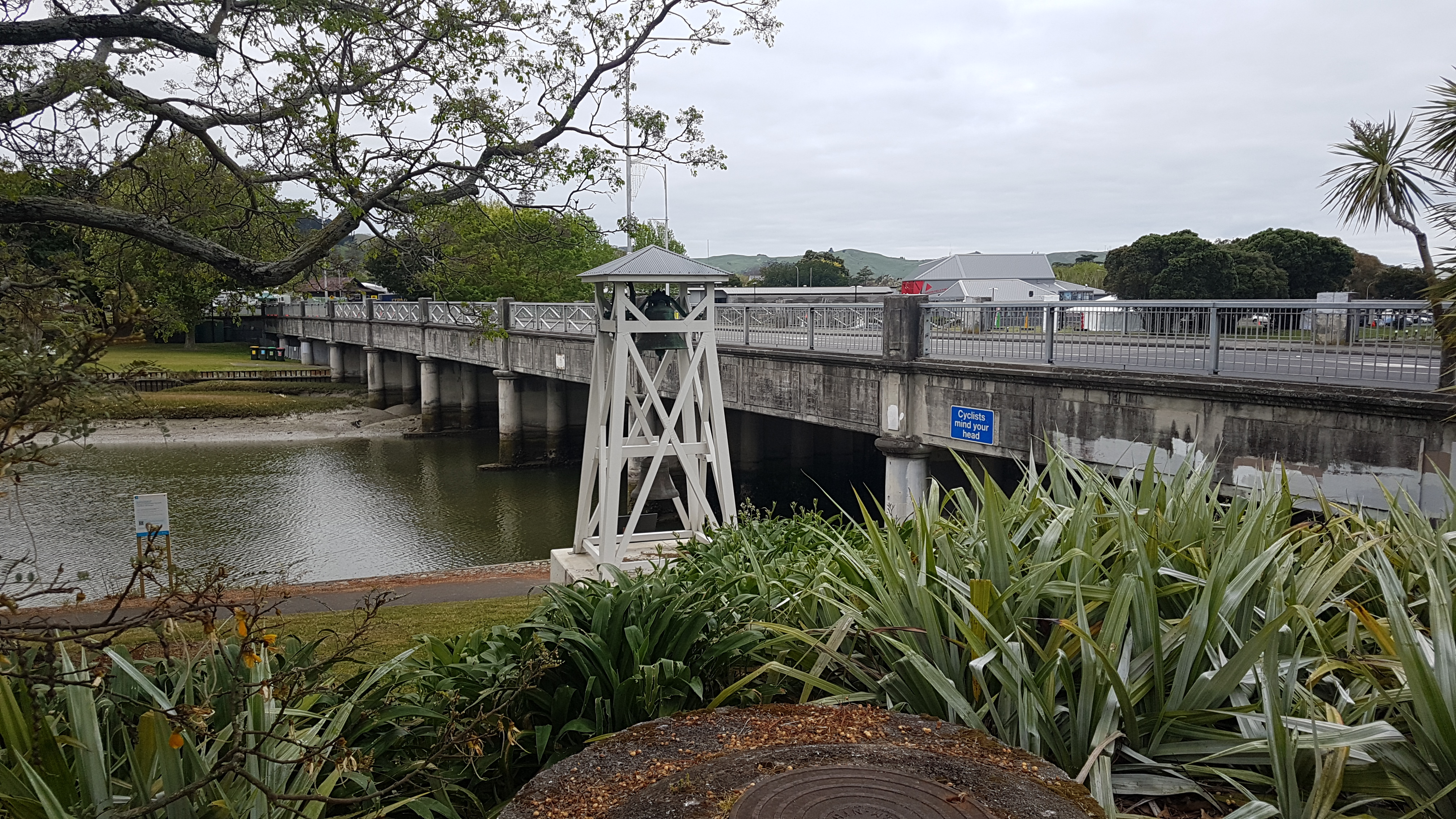
Peel Street Bridge in Gisborne

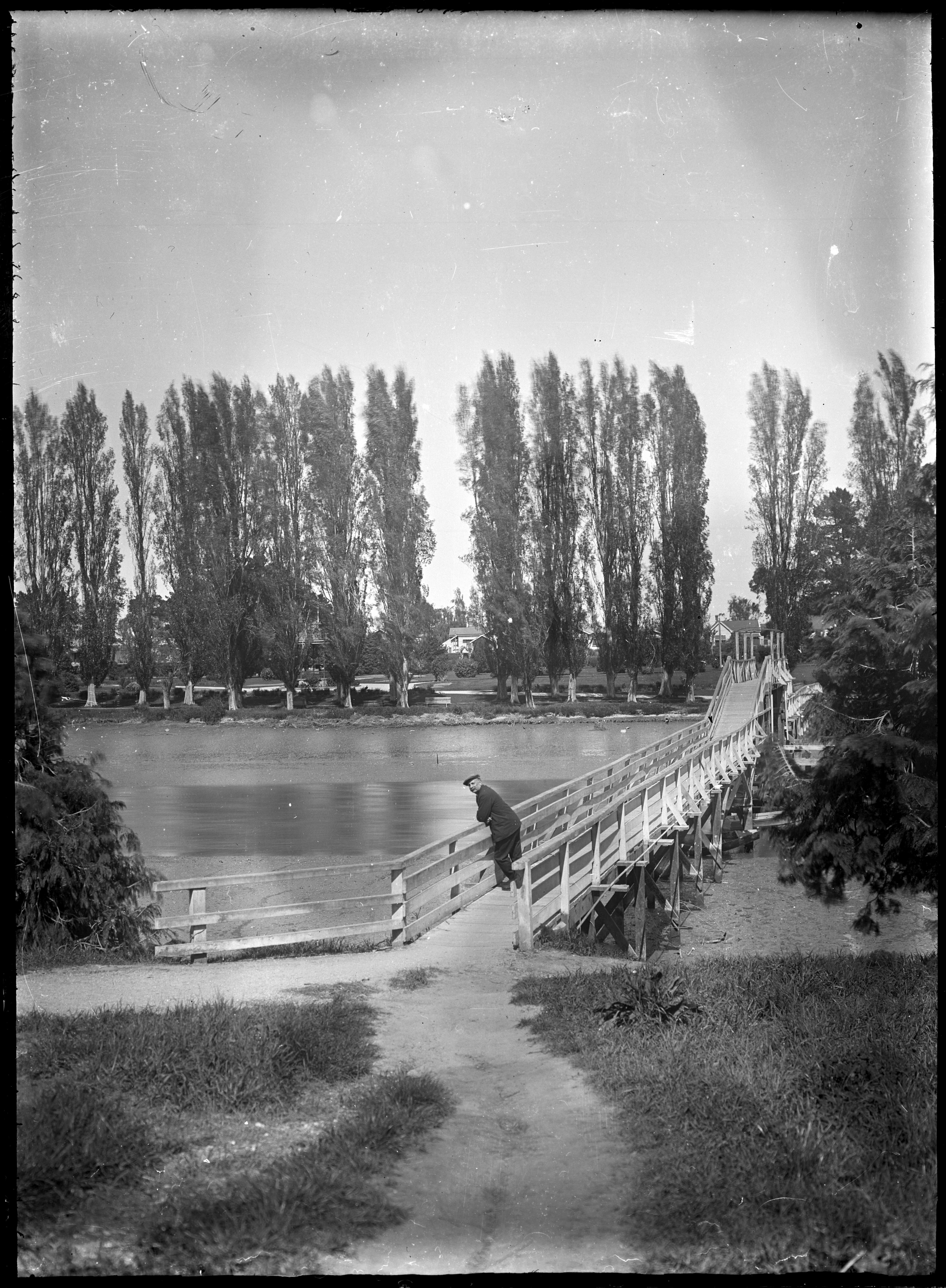
Photographer Albert Percy Godber standing next to river in the 1920s

== See also ==
- List of rivers of New Zealand
