= Phillip O'Shea =

New Zealand Herald Extraordinary (born 1947)

Phillip O'Shea CNZM CVO KStJ
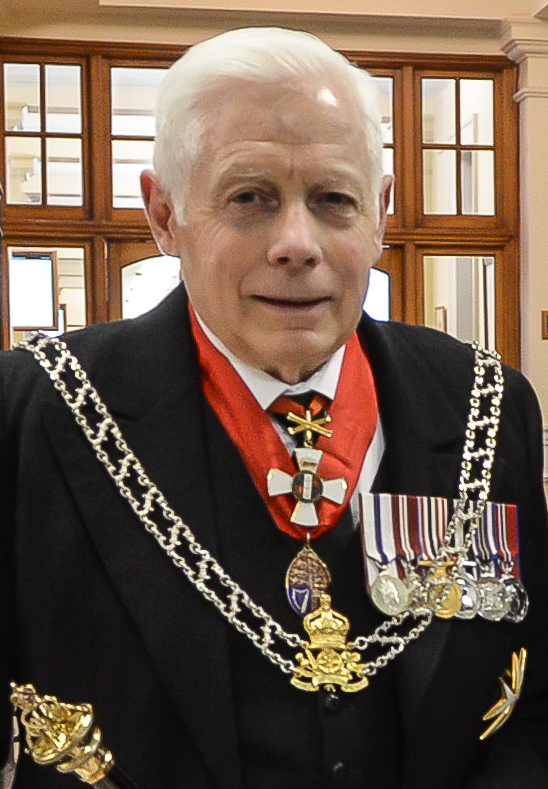
- O'Shea in 2019

New Zealand Herald Extraordinary
- Incumbent
- Assumed office 6 February 1978
- Monarchs: Elizabeth II; Charles III
- Preceded by: Office established

Personal details
- Born: Phillippe Patrick O'Shea; 23 March 1947 (age 79) Wellington, New Zealand
- Education: St Patrick's College
- Alma mater: Victoria University of Wellington
- Occupation: Public servant

Phillippe Patrick O'Shea CNZM CVO KStJ (born 23 March 1947) is a New Zealand public servant and officer of arms. He has served as New Zealand Herald of Arms Extraordinary since 1978, amongst other roles in the public service of New Zealand.

== Biography ==
O'Shea was educated at St Patrick's College in Wellington. In the 1960s, he later graduated from the Victoria University of Wellington. After gaining his qualifications, O'Shea became a junior public servant. He would remain in the public service for the rest of his career.

He started in the public service as librarian and numismatic advisor to the New Zealand Treasury between 1967 and 1974. After this, O'Shea moved to become the advisory officer to the honours section of the Department of the Prime Minister and Cabinet in 1974. He remained in that position until 2004. In 1978, the Garter Principal King of Arms, appointed him the New Zealand Herald of Arms Extraordinary to Her Majesty The Queen, a position that no New Zealander had held before. He has since remained in that position as of present.

In this mostly symbolic position, O'Shea has been the principal adviser to governments regarding the honours and awards granted to New Zealanders, including the designing of the Queen's Service Order (1975), the Order of New Zealand (1987), and the New Zealand Order of Merit (1996), amongst other commemorative medals. As part of his heraldic duties, he has also been involved in the design of coats of arms for several governors-general. O'Shea has since been recognised with a number of honours himself due to his contributions as the specialist advisor of the honours unit to the Realm of New Zealand.

== Honours ==
Companion of the New Zealand Order of Merit (CNZM)	2005 Queen's Birthday Honours
Commander of the Royal Victorian Order (CVO)	2014 New Year Honours
Knight of the Order of St John (KStJ)	1998
Queen Elizabeth II Silver Jubilee Medal	1977
Queen Elizabeth II Diamond Jubilee Medal	2012
Queen Elizabeth II Platinum Jubilee Medal	2022
New Zealand 1990 Commemoration Medal	1990
Service Medal of the Order of St John	19??
The Antigua and Barbuda 25th Anniversary of Independence Medal	2006
Queen Elizabeth II Diamond Jubilee Medal (For the Caribbean)	2012

== Arms ==
Coat of arms of Phillippe Patrick O'Shea
Notes Crest Statant within a crown or a kea holding in his dexter claw the baton of the New Zealand Herald of Arms Extraordinary all proper. Escutcheon Or, the badge of the New Zealand Herald of Extraordinary (a complex Māori Koru coloured in the traditional manner proper ensigned by a representation of the royal crown also proper) with, on a chief azure, a mānuka flower proper between two plates. Motto To be competent

== Bibliography ==
- Professor Sir John Rankine Brown, K.B.E., L.L.D. (Hon)., M.A., F.N.Z.I.A., 1861-1946, Foundation Professor of Classics at Victoria University Wellington N.Z.: A Short Biography (1968)
- Atavis Et Armis: The Military and Hospitaller Order of St. Lazarus of Jerusalem in New Zealand (1968, Royal Numismatic Society of New Zealand)
- New Zealand Coinage (1970, Coinage Section, The Treasury)
- Captain James Cook, R.N., F.R.S. and His Numismatic Associations (1970, Royal Numismatic Society of New Zealand)
- Honours, Titles, Styles, and Precedence in New Zealand (1970, Government Printer, South Africa) and supplement (1980)
- Royal Humane Society of New Zealand (1971, Royal Humane Society of New Zealand)
- An Unknown Few: The Story of Those Holders of the George Cross, the Empire Gallantry Medal, and the Albert Medals Associated with New Zealand (1981, P.D. Hasselberg, Government Printer; ISBN 9780477011006, 0477011004)
