= Taoga Niue =

Government department

Tāoga Niuē is the main Government department to support and promote the use and preservation of the Niuean culture, language and tradition. Taoga Niue is the sixth pillar of the Niue Integrated Strategic Plan (NISP). Taoga Niue is now a Government Department with its main office at Paliati, Niue High School.

== See also ==
- Tāoga Niue Museum
