= Cyclone Heta =

South Pacific cyclone in 2003 and 2004

Severe Tropical Cyclone Heta
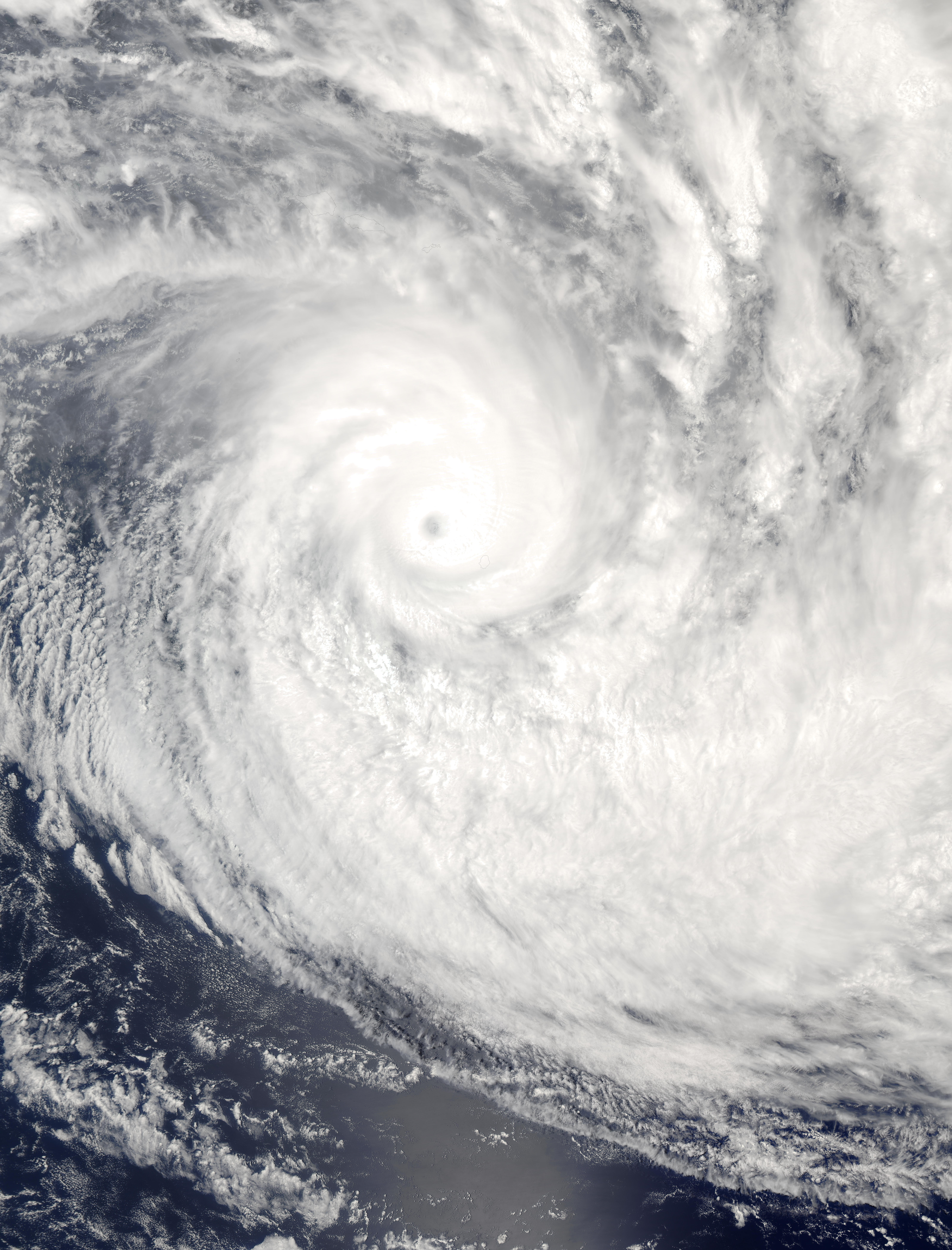
- Cyclone Heta at peak intensity

Meteorological history
- Formed: December 25, 2003
- Dissipated: January 11, 2004

Category 5 severe tropical cyclone
- 10-minute sustained (FMS)
- Highest winds: 215 km/h (130 mph)
- Lowest pressure: 915 hPa (mbar); 27.02 inHg

Category 5-equivalent tropical cyclone
- 1-minute sustained (SSHWS/JTWC)
- Highest winds: 260 km/h (160 mph)
- Lowest pressure: 898 hPa (mbar); 26.52 inHg

Overall effects
- Fatalities: 1
- Damage: $113 million (2004 USD)
- Areas affected: Samoan Islands, Tonga, Niue
- IBTrACS
- Part of the 2003–04 South Pacific cyclone season

Severe Tropical Cyclone Heta was a Category 5 tropical cyclone that caused moderate damage to the islands of Tonga, Niue, and American Samoa during late December 2003 and early January 2004. Heta formed on December 25, 2003; it reached a maximum intensity of 260 km/h (160 mph) and an estimated pressure of 915 hPa (27.02 inHg) before dissipating on January 11, 2004. It was the first named tropical cyclone to form during the 2003–04 South Pacific cyclone season.

The damage Heta caused on Tonga, Niue, and American Samoa was estimated at $150 million (2004 USD), with most of the damage occurring in American Samoa; the cyclone was also responsible for one death. Heta precipitated a massive relief and clean-up operation that lasted throughout 2004.

== Meteorological history ==
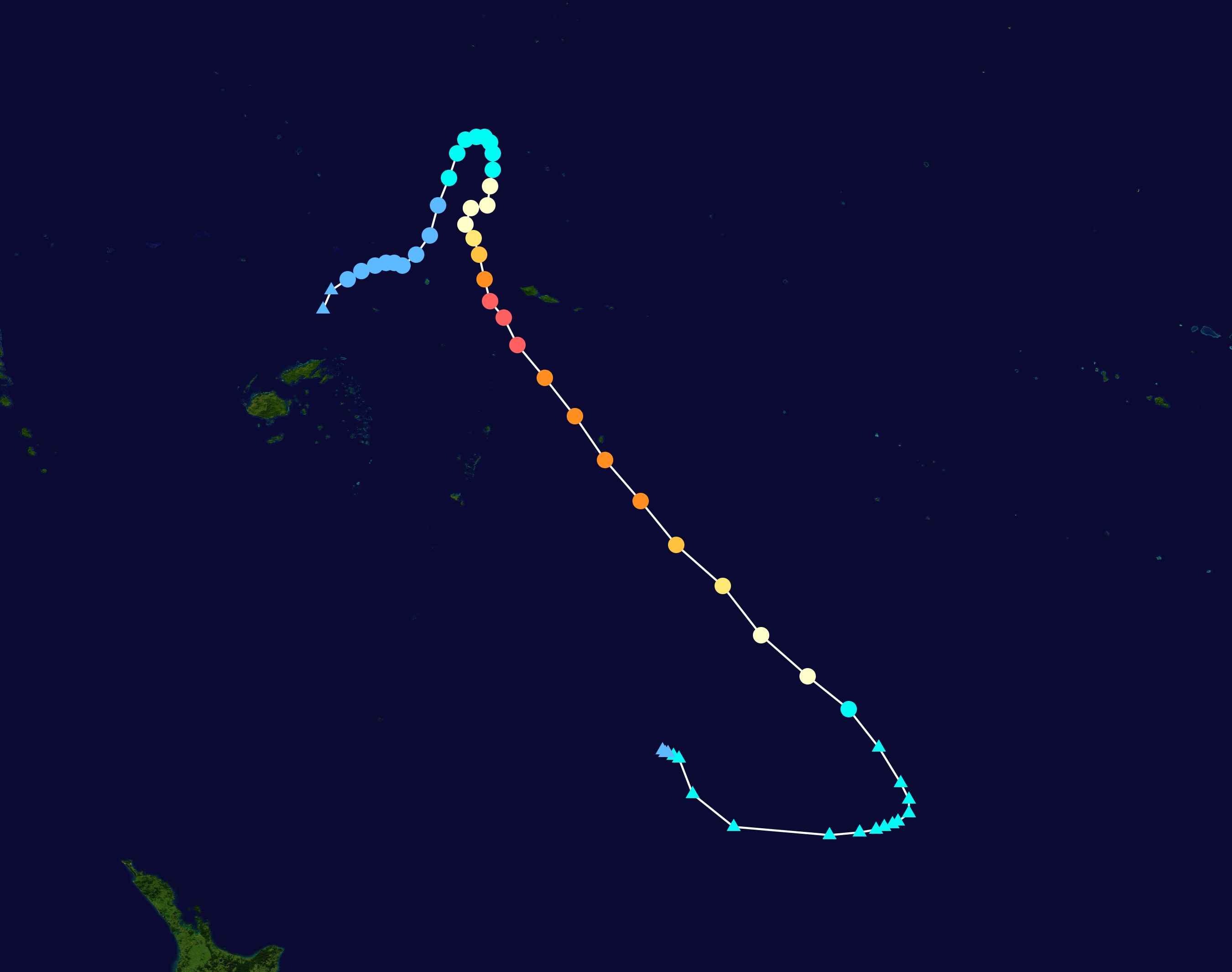
Map plotting the storm's track and intensity, according to the Saffir–Simpson scale Map key Saffir–Simpson scale Tropical depression (≤38 mph, ≤62 km/h) Tropical storm (39–73 mph, 63–118 km/h) Category 1 (74–95 mph, 119–153 km/h) Category 2 (96–110 mph, 154–177 km/h) Category 3 (111–129 mph, 178–208 km/h) Category 4 (130–156 mph, 209–251 km/h) Category 5 (≥157 mph, ≥252 km/h) Unknown Storm type Tropical cyclone Subtropical cyclone Extratropical cyclone, remnant low, tropical disturbance, or monsoon depression

During December 25, 2003 the Fiji Meteorological Service reported that Tropical Disturbance 03F had developed underneath the subtropical ridge of high pressure about halfway between Fiji and Rotuma. At this time, the disturbance was poorly organised with atmospheric convection surrounding the system displaced by about a degree to the north and east of its low-level circulation centre. Over the next few days, the system gradually developed further and was classified as a tropical depression by the FMS during December 28, as it slowly moved eastwards to the north of Fiji. During the next day, as the depression passed about 40 km (25 mi) to the northeast of Futuna, the system started to move north-eastwards towards Tokelau.

The depression migrated first northward and then eastward until January 2, 2004, when it reached tropical storm strength and was named Heta. At this point, low wind shear and high sea surface temperatures caused Heta to intensify rapidly. On January 3, Heta, aided by a weak steering current, slowly began to move to the southeast as it became a Category 1 hurricane.

The center of Heta passed 70 miles (110 km) west of Samoa as the storm reached Category 2 status. Heta reached a peak intensity of 260 km/h (160 mph) at midnight UTC on January 5, and maintained it for 24 hours as it continued its south-southeastward track. Heta passed close to the island of Niue at 03:00 UTC January 6 as it began slowly weakening. By January 7, Cyclone Heta had exited the Nadi RMSC's area of responsibility and entered that of the Tropical Cyclone Warning Center at Wellington, New Zealand. The storm slowly weakened as it encountered the cooler waters of the far South Pacific. Heta became extratropical 845 km (525 mi) south of the island of Rarotonga later on the 7th. These remnants of Heta slowed even further and moved westward, where they finally dissipated on January 11 east of Norfolk Island.

== Effects ==
=== Tokelau ===
During January 1, the FMS issued a tropical cyclone alert for Tokelau before upgrading it later that day to a gale warning, as Heta was expected to cause gale-force winds over the islands within 24–36 hours. The warning was kept in force over the next 48 hours before it was cancelled during January 3, after Heta had moved away from Tokelau.

=== Samoan Islands ===
In Samoa and American Samoa, although hurricane warnings were in effect, there were no reports of evacuations or storm shelters being opened before the storm.

=== Niue ===
In Niue, anticipating that the storm would bring catastrophic damage, 1300 residents sought shelter in their homes while others evacuated coastal areas to higher ground. One person was reported dead, and the storm damage described as the worst in living memory. The capital Alofi was destroyed, as was the island's only hospital.

== Impact ==
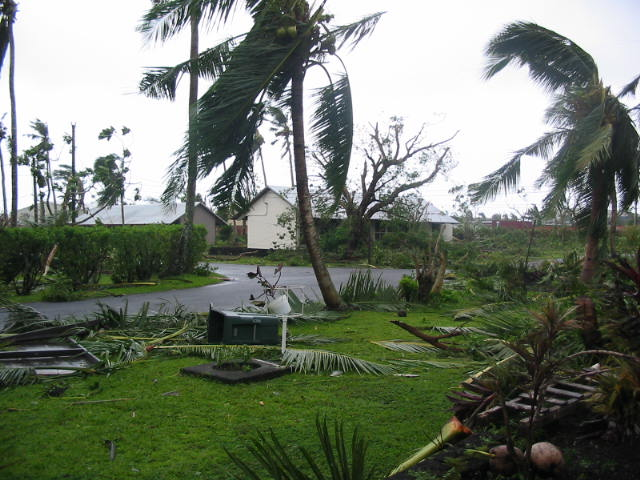
Wind damage in the American Samoa.

Cyclone Heta caused around $110 to $150 million (2004 USD) in damage and one fatality in its path across Tonga, Niue, Samoa, and American Samoa.

During its early stages, Heta brought heavy rains and light winds but caused little or no damage. In Wallis and Futuna, however, high winds knocked out power and there was minor to moderate damage to buildings and crops. In Tonga, Heta's strong winds damaged houses and caused severe crop damage, mostly to breadfruit, mango, tava and bananas. In Tafahi and Niuatoputapu, 50–100% of the homes and buildings were destroyed by the cyclone's powerful, Category 5 winds. However, because of advanced warnings, there were no deaths or injuries. Structural damage in Tonga amounted to $160,000 (2004 USD).

In Niue, a weather station recorded a barometric pressure of 945 millibars before it became inoperable. The capital city of Alofi, which took the brunt of the storm, was devastated as most of the commercial and financial areas were wiped out by the high winds. Damage to communications and electronic infrastructure was also great as the storm damaged a satellite dish and disabled 75% of Niue's computer database. The storm surge brought by Heta left two people dead. In all, the storm caused over $85 million (2004 NZD) in damage on the island, five times its 2003 GDP of $17 million. Damage also included irreplaceable losses to the island's cultural heritage: Huanaki Cultural Centre & Museum was destroyed along with over 90% of the museum's collections.

In Apia, Samoa, the heavy rains brought by Heta caused isolated reports of flooding. Heta's storm surge also closed down or washed out several roads. In Savai'i, the cyclones winds damaged powerlines, which made communications with the city difficult. In American Samoa, two weather stations reported winds of 120 km/h (75 mph) with gusts of 185 km/h (115 mph). The high winds destroyed over 600 homes and damaged 4,000 others. Offshore, the storm brought waves up to 13.4 m (44 ft) high along the north and western part of the island. The combination of rough surf and storm surge damaged or destroyed many boats near Swains Island. Although no deaths were reported in Samoa, the storm managed to injure 20 people and leave between $50–150 million (2005 USD) in damage.

== Aftermath ==
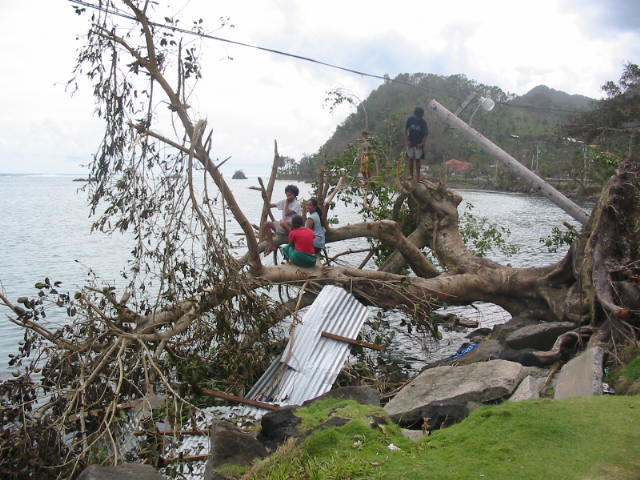
Residents cleaning up after the storm.

The government of Niue declared a state of emergency after Cyclone Heta's impact. On January 8, New Zealand and Australia provided relief aid and supplies to the displaced residents. The aid provided by New Zealand's government amounted to $5 million (2004 NZD). The devastation left by Heta led to a major recovery plan by the government of Niue that lasted throughout 2004 and cost over $20 million (2004 NZD). In Samoa, the International Red Cross and Red Crescent sent 60 volunteers, and distributed 150 tarpaulins and 340 water containers and blankets to the devastated area. On January 9, the number of volunteers increased to 100, and over 944 aid items were distributed. In Tonga, the Red Cross conducted a damage survey and provided relief aid to Niuatoputapu, which was hit especially hard by the cyclone. In addition, New Zealand provided $10,000 (2004 USD) worth of supplies and relief aid to Tonga.

In American Samoa, Governor Aitofele Sunia declared a state of emergency after the cyclone, and later President George W. Bush declared the U.S. territory a disaster area. The declaration made the territory eligible for federal assistance and relief. The damage from the cyclone caused an evacuation of 140 residents to relief shelters, thirteen of which were opened after the storm. In addition, the Small Business Administration (SBA) offered $40,000–$200,000 (2004 USD) in repair loans for residents and $1.5 million (2004 USD) in repair loans for businesses. The federal government offered $22 million (2004 USD) in relief aid through the Federal Emergency Management Agency (FEMA). The United Church of Christ also provided $5,000 in relief aid.

== See also ==
- Tropical cyclones in 2003 and 2004
- Weathers of 2003 and 2004
- Cyclone Ofa
- Cyclone Val
