= Timeline of the 2003–04 South Pacific cyclone season =

Timeline of the 2003-04 South Pacific cyclone season
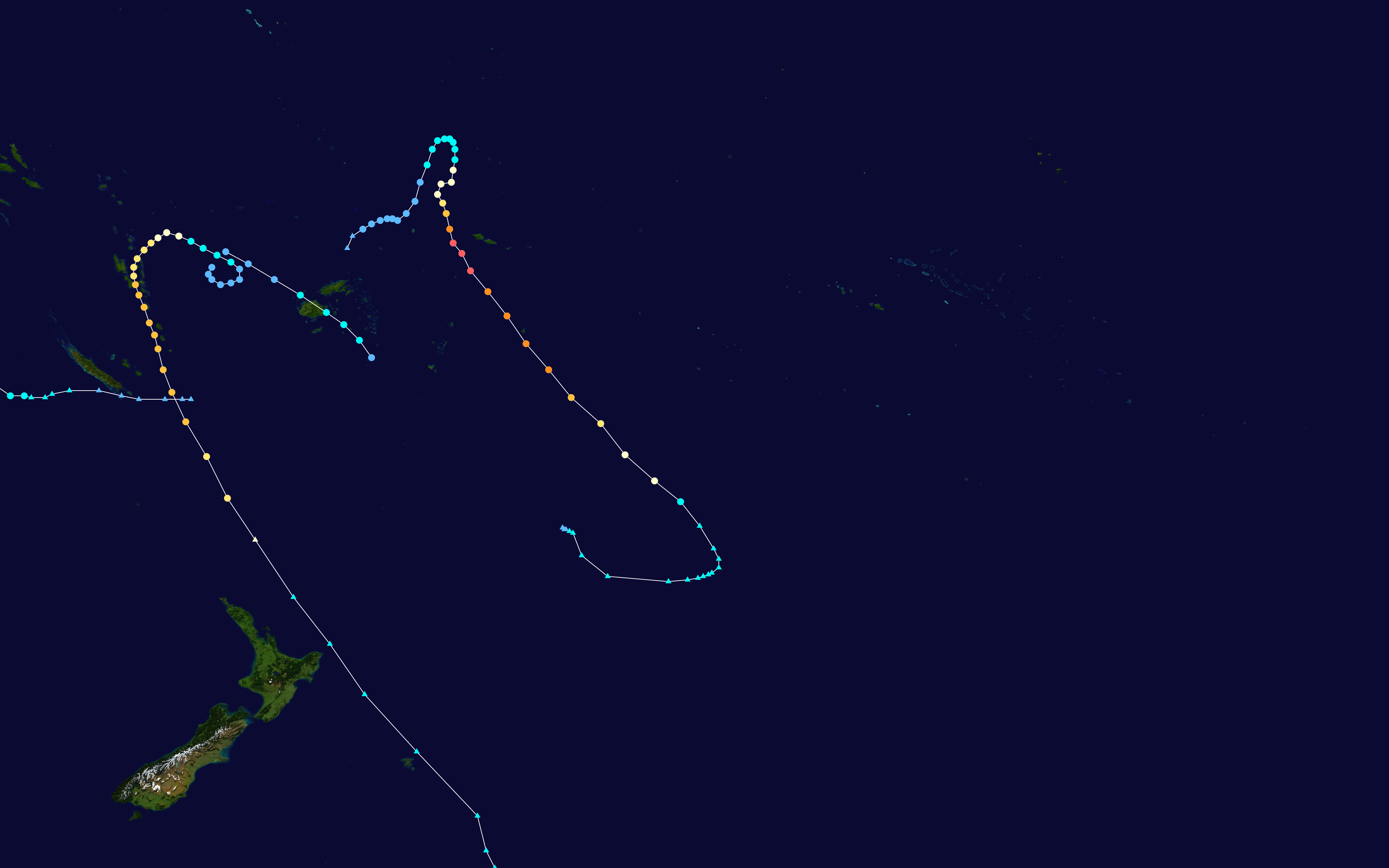
- Season summary map

Season boundaries
- First system formed: December 4, 2003
- Last system dissipated: April 24, 2004

Longest lasting system
- Name: Heta
- Duration: 14 days
Storm articles
- Cyclone Heta
- Cyclone Ivy
- Tropical Depression 10F (2004)

The 2003–04 South Pacific cyclone season was a below-average season with only three tropical cyclones occurring within the South Pacific to the east of 160°E. The season officially ran from November 1, 2003, to April 30, 2004, with the first disturbance of the season forming on December 4 and the last disturbance dissipating on April 23. (Note: An average season has nine tropical cyclones, about half of which become severe tropical cyclones.) (Note: RSMC Nadi warns on systems in the South Pacific which is located from the equator to 25°S and from 160°E to 120°W. TCWC Wellington warns on systems from 25°S to 40°S and from 160°E to 120°W) This is the period of the year when most tropical cyclones form within the South Pacific Ocean.

During the season at least 16 deaths resulted from tropical disturbances whilst overall damage was estimated at $218 million (2004 USD; $371 million 2026 USD). The most damaging tropical disturbance was Cyclone Heta which caused at least $211 million (2004 USD; $360 million 2026 USD) in damage to six different countries and left three dead. The deadliest tropical disturbance of the season was Tropical Depression 10F, which was responsible for eleven deaths and caused $2.74 million (2004 USD; $4.67 million 2026 USD) in damage. Cyclone Ivy also caused 2 deaths and caused $4.17 million (2004 USD; $7.11 million 2026 USD) worth of damage to Vanuatu. As a result of the impacts caused by Heta and Ivy, the names were retired from the tropical cyclone naming lists.

Within the South Pacific, tropical cyclones are monitored by the Regional Specialized Meteorological Center (RSMC) in Nadi, Fiji, and the Tropical Cyclone Warning Center (TCWC) in Wellington, New Zealand. RSMC Nadi attaches a number and an F suffix to tropical disturbances that form in or move into the South Pacific. The United States Joint Typhoon Warning Center (JTWC) issues unofficial warnings within the South Pacific, designating tropical cyclones with a number and a P suffix. RSMC Nadi and TCWC Wellington both use the Australian Tropical Cyclone Intensity Scale, and measure windspeeds over a period of ten minutes, while the JTWC measures sustained winds over a period of one minute and uses the Saffir–Simpson Hurricane Scale.

This timeline includes information from post-storm reviews by RSMC Nadi, TCWC Wellington and the JTWC. It documents tropical cyclone formations, strengthening, weakening, landfalls, extratropical transitions, and dissipations during the season. Reports among warning centers often differ; as such, information from all three agencies has been included.

== Timeline ==
=== November ===
November 1

- 0000 UTC, (1200 FST) – The 2003–04 South Pacific cyclone season officially begins. (Note: UTC stands for Coordinated Universal Time.) (Note: FST stands for Fiji Standard Time, which is equivalent to UTC+12.) (Note: The figures for maximum sustained winds and position estimates are rounded to the nearest 5 units (knots, miles, or kilometers), following the convention used in the Fiji Meteorological Service's operational products for each storm. All other units are rounded to the nearest digit.)

=== December ===
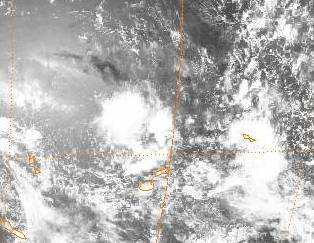
Image of Tropical Depression 01F on December 4, 2003

December 4

- 0000 UTC, (1200 FST) – RSMC Nadi reports that Tropical Disturbance 01F has formed about 1,965 kilometres (1,221 mi) to the north of Nadi, Fiji.

December 5

- 0600 UTC, (1800 FST) – RSMC Nadi reports that Tropical Disturbance 01F has intensified into a tropical depression.

December 6

- 0000 UTC, (1200 FST) – RSMC Nadi issues the final advisory on Tropical Depression 01F.

December 16

- 1800 UTC, (0600 FST, December 17) – RSMC Nadi reports that Tropical Disturbance 02F has formed about 330 km (205 mi) to the northeast of Honiara in the Solomon Islands.

December 20

- 1800 UTC, (0600 FST, December 21) – RSMC Nadi passes the primary warning responsibility for Tropical Disturbance 02F to TCWC Brisbane as it moves into the Australian region.

December 25

- 0600 UTC, (1800 FST) – RSMC Nadi reports that Tropical Disturbance 03F has formed about 400 km (250 mi) to the northwest of Suva, Fiji.

December 28

- 1800 UTC, (0600 FST, December 29) – RSMC Nadi reports that Tropical Disturbance 03F has intensified into a tropical depression.

December 29

- 0000 UTC, (1200 FST) – RSMC Nadi reports that Tropical Disturbance 04F has formed about 120 km (75 mi) to the south of Honiara in the Solomon Islands.
- 1800 UTC, (0600 FST, December 21) – RSMC Nadi issues the final advisory on Tropical Disturbance 04F.

December 30

- 0000 UTC, (1200 FST) – The JTWC designates Tropical Depression 03F as Tropical Depression 07P.

=== January ===
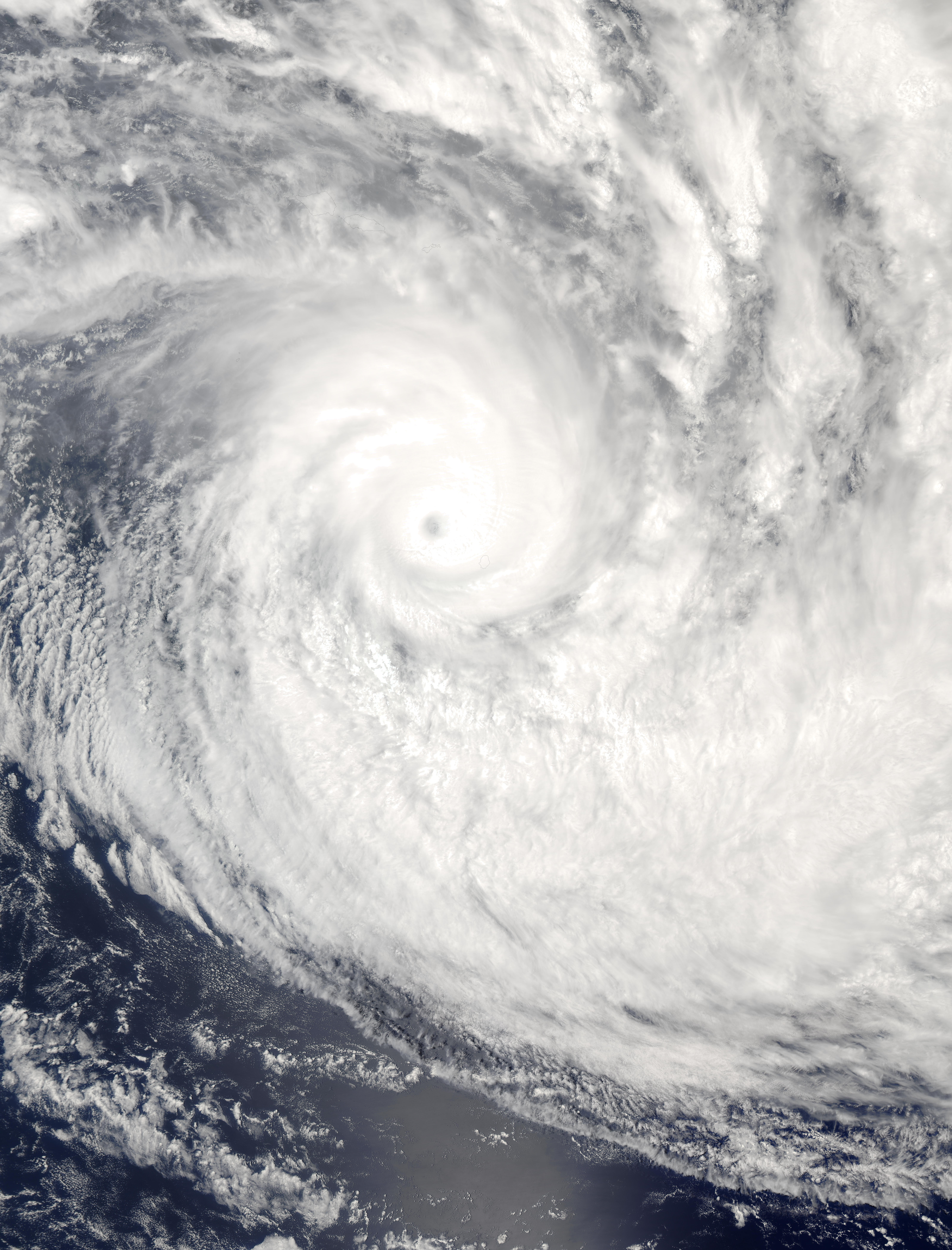
Image of Severe Tropical Cyclone Heta on January 6, 2004

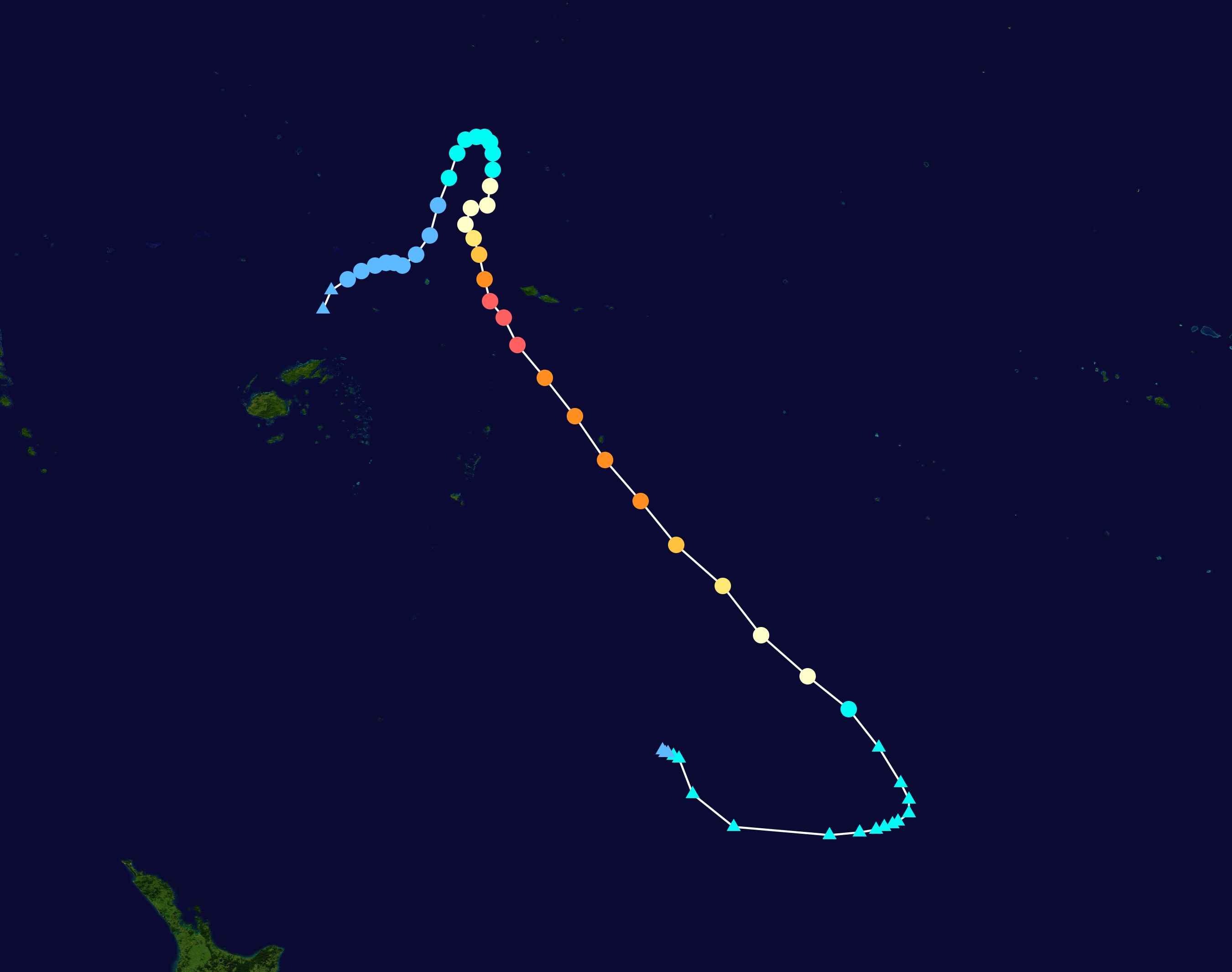
Track map of Severe Tropical Cyclone Heta

January 1

- 0600 UTC, (1800 FST) – The JTWC reports that Tropical Depression 03F (07P), has intensified into a tropical storm.

January 2

- 0000 UTC, (1200 FST) – RSMC Nadi upgrades Tropical Depression 03F (07P), has intensified into a category 1 tropical cyclone and names it Heta.
- 1200 UTC, (0000 FST, January 3) – RSMC Nadi reports that Tropical Cyclone Heta (07P), has intensified into a category 2 tropical cyclone.

January 3

- 0600 UTC, (1800 FST) – The JTWC reports that Tropical Storm Heta (07P), has intensified into a category 1 tropical cyclone.
- 1800 UTC, (0600 FST, January 4) – RSMC Nadi reports that Tropical Cyclone Heta (07P), has intensified into a category 3 severe tropical cyclone.

January 4

- 0600 UTC, (1800 FST) – The JTWC reports that Tropical Storm Heta (07P), has intensified into a category 2 tropical cyclone.
- 1200 UTC, (0000 FST, January 5) – RSMC Nadi reports that Tropical Cyclone Heta (07P), has intensified into a category 4 severe tropical cyclone.
- 1200 UTC, (0000 FST, January 5) – The JTWC reports that Tropical Cyclone Heta (07P), has intensified into a category 3 tropical cyclone.
- 1800 UTC, (0600 FST, January 5) – The JTWC reports that Tropical Cyclone Heta (07P), has intensified into a category 4 tropical cyclone.

January 5

- 0000 UTC, (1200 FST) – RSMC Nadi reports that Severe Tropical Cyclone Heta (07P) has intensified into a category 5 severe tropical cyclone.
- 0000 UTC, (1200 FST) – RSMC Nadi reports that Severe Tropical Cyclone Heta (07P), has reached its peak 10-minute sustained wind speeds of 215 km/h, (135 mph).
- 0000 UTC, (1200 FST) – The JTWC reports that Tropical Cyclone Heta (07P), has intensified into a category 5 tropical cyclone.
- 0000 UTC, (1200 FST) – The JTWC reports that Tropical Cyclone Heta (07P), has reached its peak intensity of 260 km/h (160 mph).
- 1800 UTC, (0600 FST, January 6) – The JTWC reports that Tropical Cyclone Heta (07P), has weakened into a category 4 tropical cyclone.

January 6

- 1200 UTC, (0000 FST, January 7) – RSMC Nadi reports that Severe Tropical Cyclone Heta (07P) has weakened into a category 4 severe tropical cyclone.
- 1800 UTC, (0600 FST, January 7) – The JTWC reports that Tropical Cyclone Heta (07P), has weakened into a category 3 tropical cyclone.

January 7

- 0000 UTC, (1200 FST) – The JTWC reports that Tropical Cyclone Heta (07P), has weakened into a category 2 tropical cyclone.
- 0000 UTC, (1200 FST) – RSMC Nadi passes warning responsibility for Severe Tropical Cyclone Heta (07P), to TCWC Wellington as it moves south of 25°S.
- 0600 UTC, (1800 FST) – TCWC Wellington reports that Severe Tropical Cyclone Heta (07P), has weakened into a category 3 severe tropical cyclone.
- 0600 UTC, (1800 FST) – The JTWC reports that Tropical Cyclone Heta (07P), has weakened into a category 1 tropical cyclone.
- 1800 UTC, (0600 FST) – TCWC Wellington reports that Severe Tropical Cyclone Heta (07P), has weakened into a category 2 tropical cyclone.
- 1800 UTC, (0600 FST) – The JTWC downgrades Category 1 Tropical Cyclone Heta (07P), to a tropical storm.

January 8

- 0000 UTC, (1200 FST) – TCWC Wellington reports that Tropical Cyclone Heta (07P), has weakened into an extratropical cyclone.

January 12

- 0000 UTC, (1200 FST) – TCWC Wellington issues the last advisory on extratropical cyclone Heta.

=== February ===
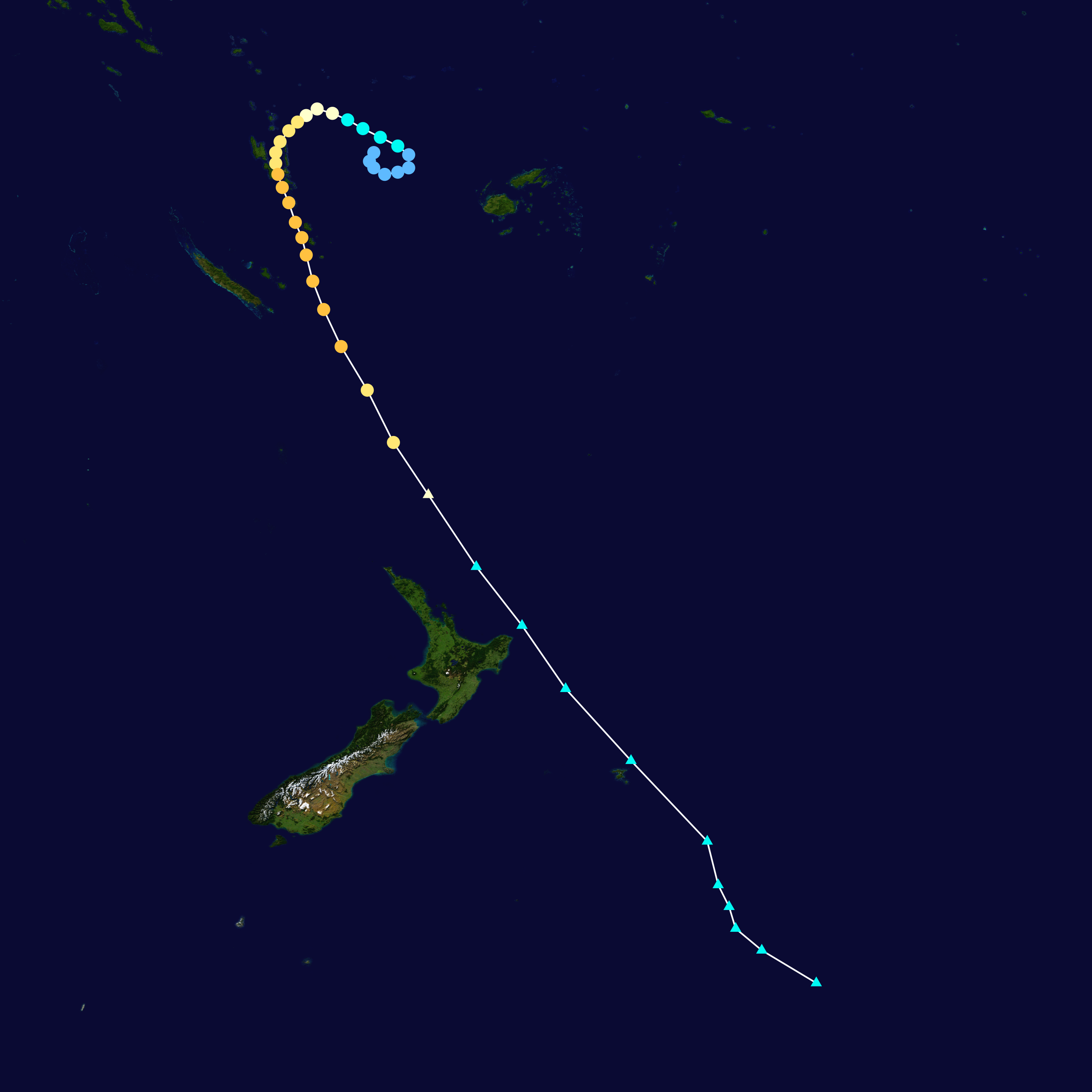
Track map of Severe Tropical Cyclone Ivy

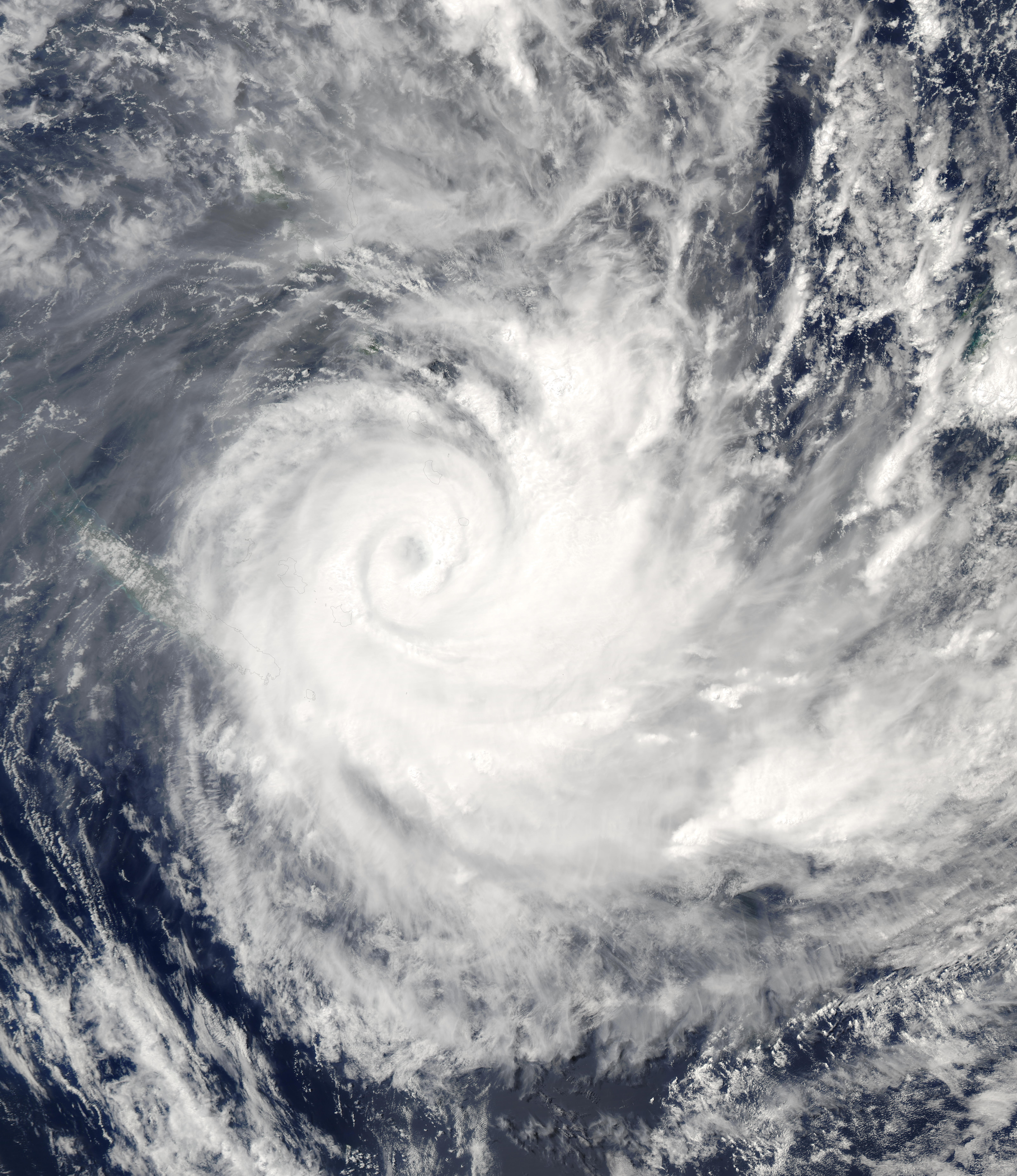
Image of Severe Tropical Cyclone Ivy on February 27, 2004

February 21

- 0000 UTC, (1200 FST) – The JTWC reports that Tropical Depression 13P, has formed about 610 km (380 mi), to the northwest of Nadi, Fiji.
- 1200 UTC, (0000 FST, February 22) – RSMC Nadi designates Tropical Depression 13P as Tropical Depression 05F.

February 22

- 1800 UTC, (0600 FST, February 23) – The JTWC reports that Tropical Depression 05F (13P), has intensified into a tropical storm.

February 23

- 0300 UTC, (1500 FST) – RSMC Nadi reports that Tropical Depression 05F (13P), has intensified into a category 1 tropical cyclone and names it Ivy.
- 1200 UTC, (0000 FST, February 24) – RSMC Nadi reports that Tropical Cyclone Ivy (13P), has intensified into a category 2 tropical cyclone.
- 1800 UTC, (0600 FST, February 24) – The JTWC reports that Tropical Storm Ivy (13P), has intensified into a category 1 tropical cyclone.

February 24

- 0600 UTC, (1800 FST) – RSMC Nadi reports that Tropical Cyclone Ivy (13P), has intensified into a category 3 severe tropical cyclone.
- 1200 UTC, (0000 FST, February 25) – The JTWC reports that Tropical Cyclone Ivy (13P), has intensified into a category 2 tropical cyclone.

February 25

- 1800 UTC, (0600 FST, February 26) – RSMC Nadi reports that Severe Tropical Cyclone Ivy (13P), has intensified into a category 4 severe tropical cyclone.
- 1800 UTC, (0600 FST, February 26) – RSMC Nadi reports that Severe Tropical Cyclone Ivy (13P), has reached its peak 10-minute sustained wind speeds of 170 km/h, (105 mph).
- 1800 UTC, (0600 FST, February 26) – The JTWC reports that Tropical Cyclone Ivy (13P), has intensified into a category 3 tropical cyclone.
- 1800 UTC, (0600 FST, February 26) – The JTWC reports that Tropical Cyclone Ivy (13P), has reached its peak 1-minute sustained wind speeds of 190 km/h, (120 mph).

February 26

- 0600 UTC, (1800 FST) – Category 4 Severe Tropical Cyclone Ivy (13P), makes landfall on Efate Island, Vanuatu with winds of 10-minute sustained wind speeds of 170 km/h, (105 mph).

February 27

- 1800 UTC, (0600 FST, February 28) – RSMC Nadi reports that Severe Tropical Cyclone Ivy (13P), has weakened into a category 3 severe tropical cyclone.
- 1800 UTC, (0600 FST, February 28) – RSMC Nadi passes the primary warning responsibility for Category 3 Severe Tropical Cyclone Ivy (13P), to TCWC Wellington as it moves to the south of 25°S.

February 28

- 0000 UTC, (1200 FST) – The JTWC reports that Tropical Cyclone Ivy (13P), has weakened into a category 2 tropical cyclone.
- 1200 UTC, (0000 FST, February 29) – TCWC Wellington reports that Severe Tropical Cyclone Ivy (13P), has weakened into an extratropical cyclone.
- 1200 UTC, (0000 FST, February 29) – The JTWC reports that Tropical Cyclone Ivy (13P), has weakened into a category 1 tropical cyclone.
- 1800 UTC, (0600 FST, February 29) – The JTWC downgrades Category 1 Tropical Cyclone Ivy (13P), to a tropical storm.

=== March ===
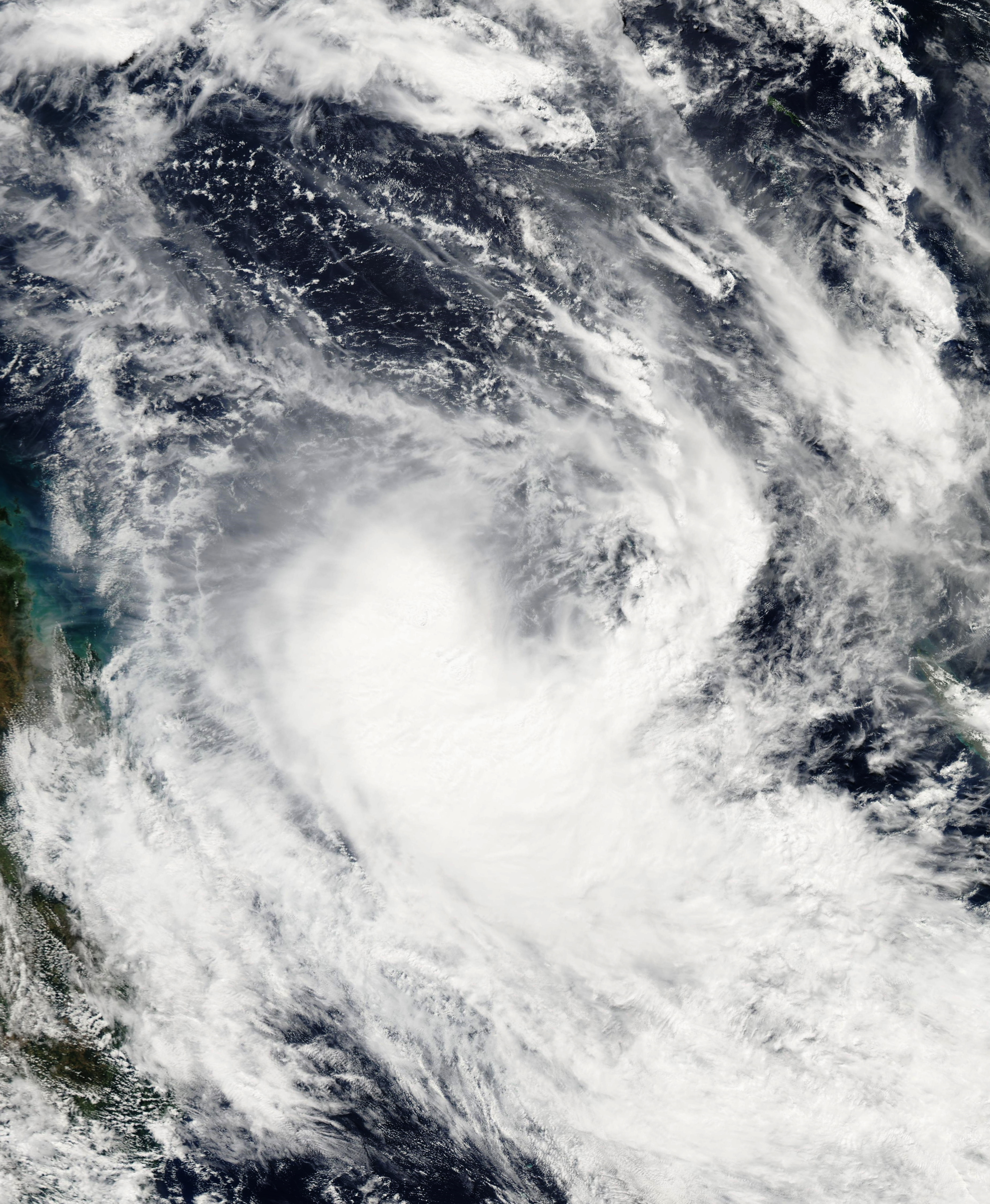
Image of Tropical Cyclone Grace on March 22, 2004

March 3

- 0000 UTC, (1200 FST) – TCWC Wellington issues the final advisory on extratropical cyclone Ivy (13P) as Ivy has been absorbed by a low located within the subarctic.

March 20

- 1800 UTC, (0600 FST, March 21) – RSMC Nadi reports that Tropical Depression 06F has formed 360 km (225 mi) west-southwest of Port Vila, Vanuatu.

March 22

- 1800 UTC, (0600 FST, March 23) – RSMC Nadi issues the final advisory on Tropical Depression 06F.
- 1800 UTC, (0600 FST, March 23) – TCWC Brisbane passes primary warning responsibility for Tropical Cyclone Grace (21P) to RSMC Nadi.

March 23

- 0000 UTC, (1200 FST) – RSMC Nadi reports that Tropical Cyclone Grace has moved into the South Pacific from the Australian region, as a category 2 tropical cyclone at its peak 10-minute sustained wind speeds of 95 km/h (60 mph).
- 1200 UTC, (0000 FST, March 24) – RSMC Nadi reports that Tropical Cyclone Grace has weakened into a category 1 tropical cyclone.

March 24

- 1800 UTC, (0600 FST, March 25) – RSMC Nadi reports that Tropical Cyclone Grace has weakened into an extratropical depression.

March 26

- 0000 UTC, (1200 FST) – RSMC Nadi issues the final advisory on extratropical depression Grace.

March 30

- 0600 UTC, (1800 FST) – RSMC Nadi reports that Tropical Depression 08F has formed 305 km (190 mi) southeast of Nuku'alofa, Tonga.

=== April ===
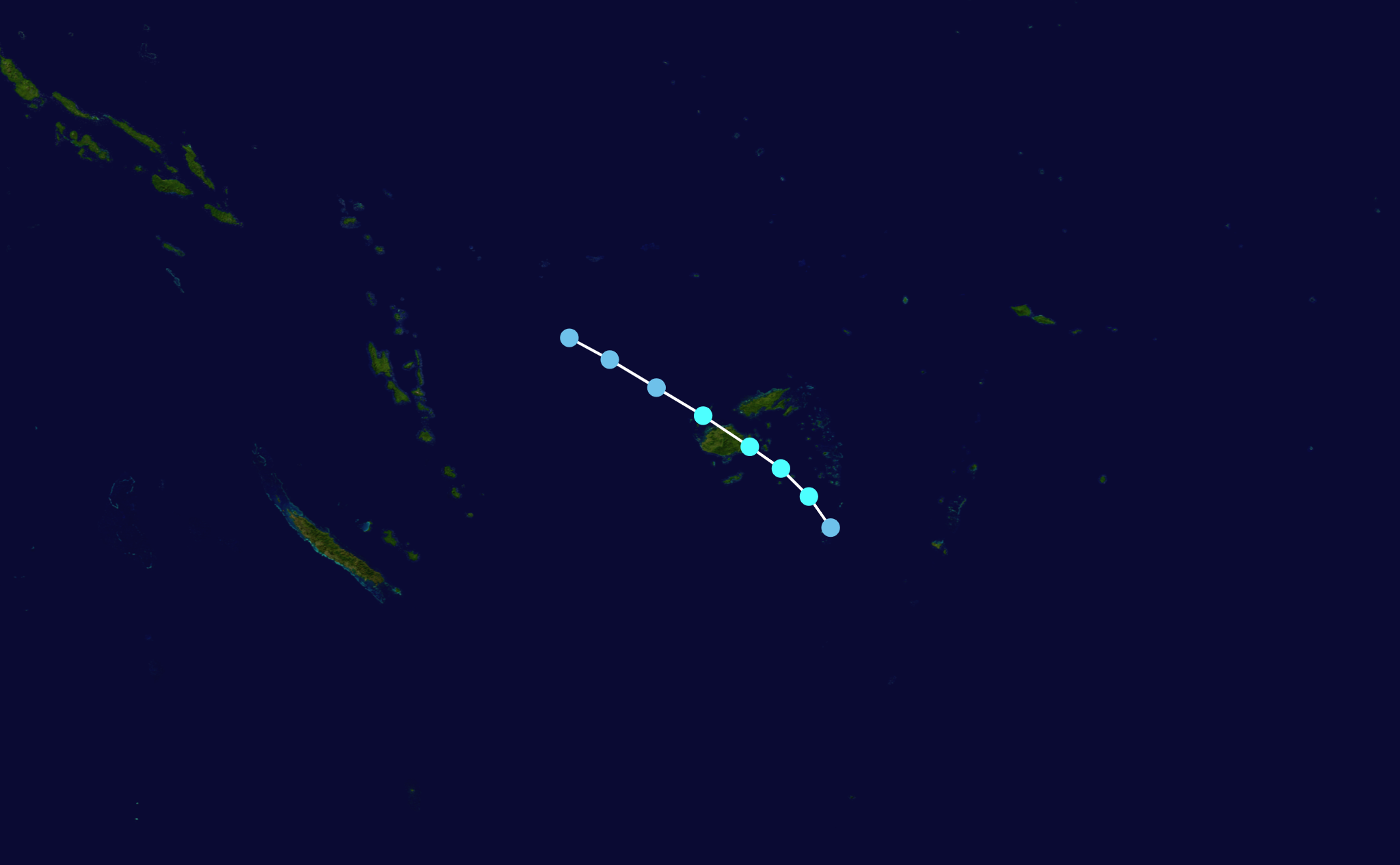
Track map of Tropical Depression 10F (22P)

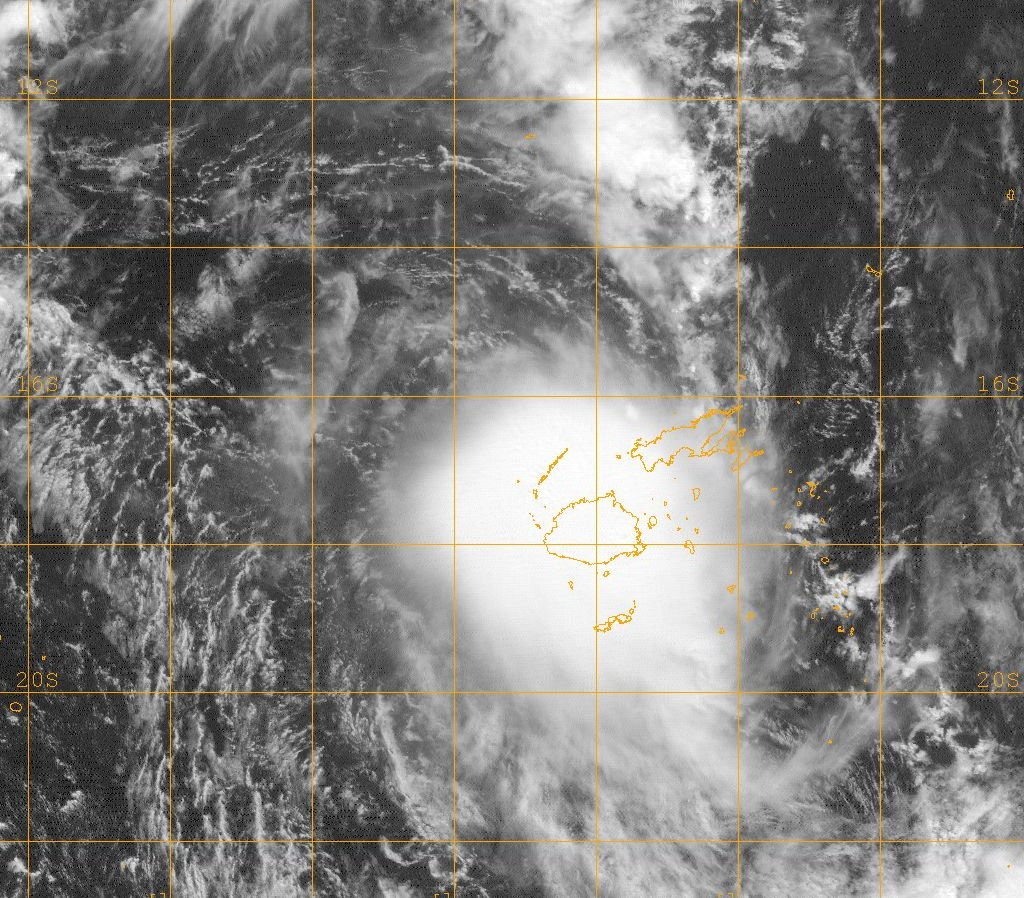
Image of Tropical Depression 10F (22P) approaching landfall on April 7, 2004

April 1

- 0600 UTC, (1800 FST) – RSMC Nadi issues the final advisory on Tropical Depression 08F as it becomes extratropical.
- 1800 UTC, (0600 FST, April 2) – RSMC Nadi reports that Tropical Depression 09F has formed about 345 km (215 mi) to the southeast of Papeete, Tahiti.

April 3

- 1800 UTC, (0600 FST, April 4) – RSMC Nadi issues the final advisory on Tropical Depression 09F.

April 4

- 1800 UTC, (0600 FST, April 5) – RSMC Nadi reports that Tropical Depression 10F has formed about 700 km (435 mi) to the north of Port Vila, Vanuatu.

April 7

- 0000 UTC, (1200 FST) – RSMC Nadi reports that Tropical Disturbance 11F has formed about 230 km (145 mi) to the east of Nadi, Fiji.
- 0600 UTC, (1800 FST) – RSMC Nadi reports that Tropical Depression 12F has formed about 255 km (160 mi) to the southeast of Honiara in the Solomon Islands.
- 0600 UTC, (1800 FST) – RSMC Nadi reports that Tropical Disturbance 11F has intensified into a tropical depression.
- 0600 UTC, (1800 FST) – The JTWC designates Tropical Depression 10F as Tropical Depression 22P.

April 8

- 0000 UTC, (1200 FST) – RSMC Nadi issues the final advisory on Tropical Depression 11F.
- 0000 UTC, (1200 FST) – The JTWC reports that Tropical Depression 10F (22P), has intensified into a tropical storm.
- 0000 UTC, (1200 FST) – The JTWC reports that Tropical Storm 10F (22P), has reached its peak 1-minute sustained wind speeds of 65 km/h (35 mph).
- 0600 UTC, (1800 FST) – Tropical Depression 10F (22P) makes landfall near Nadi, Fiji.

April 9

- 0000 UTC, (1200 FST) – The JTWC downgrades Tropical Storm 22P (10F) to a tropical depression and declares it dissipated.
- 0600 UTC, (1800 FST) – RSMC Nadi issues the final advisory on Tropical Depression 10F.

April 12

- 0000 UTC, (1200 FST) – RSMC Nadi reports that Tropical Disturbance 13F has formed about 210 km 130 mi to the southwest of Honiara, Solomon Islands.
- 1800 UTC, (0600 FST, April 13) – RSMC Nadi issues the final advisory on Tropical Depression 12F.
- 1800 UTC, (0600 FST, April 13) – RSMC Nadi reports that Tropical Disturbance 13F has intensified into a tropical depression.

April 13

- 0000 UTC, (1200 FST) – RSMC Nadi issues the final advisory on Tropical Depression 13F.

April 19

- 0000 UTC, (1200 FST) – RSMC Nadi reports that Tropical Disturbance 14F has formed about 500 km (315 mi) to the northeast of Nuku'alofa, Tonga.
- 0600 UTC, (1800 FST) – RSMC Nadi issues the final advisory on Tropical Disturbance 14F.

April 21

- 1800 UTC, (0600 FST, April 22) – RSMC Nadi reports that Tropical Disturbance 15F has formed 315 miles (510 km) northeast of Honiara, Solomon Islands.

April 23

- 1800 UTC, (0600 FST, April 23) – RSMC Nadi issues the final advisory on Tropical Disturbance 15F.

April 30

- 1200 UTC, (0000 FST, May 1) – The 2003–04 South Pacific cyclone season officially ends.
