= 2003–04 South Pacific cyclone season =

Tropical cyclone season

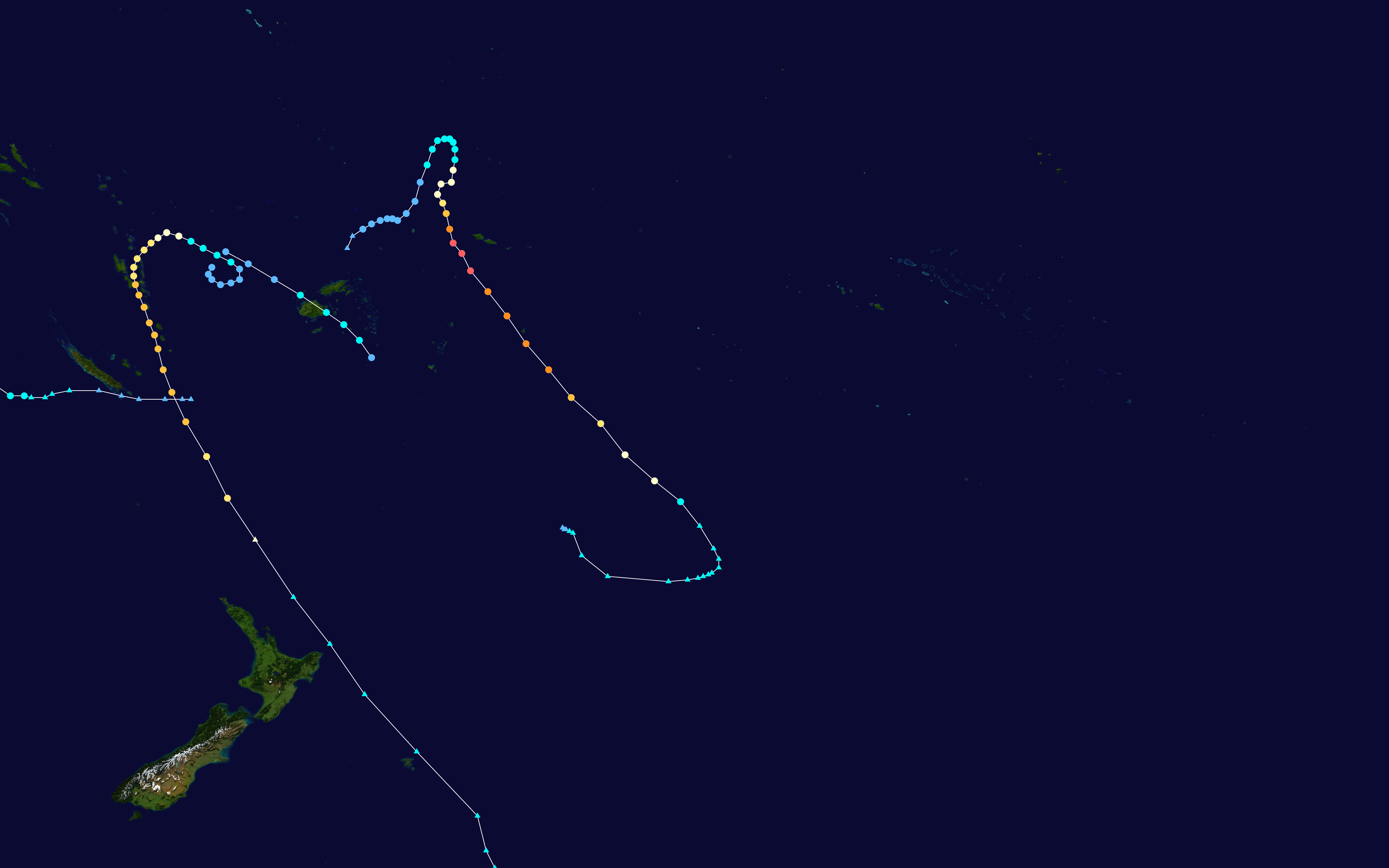
- Season summary map

Seasonal boundaries
- First system formed: December 4, 2003
- Last system dissipated: April 24, 2004

Strongest storm
- Name: Heta
  - Maximum winds: 215 km/h (130 mph) (10-minute sustained)
  - Lowest pressure: 915 hPa (mbar)

Seasonal statistics
- Total disturbances: 15
- Total depressions: 12
- Tropical cyclones: 3 (tied, second lowest with 2011–12)
- Severe tropical cyclones: 2
- Total fatalities: 16
- Total damage: $387 million (2004 USD)

Related articles
- Timeline of the 2003–04 South Pacific cyclone season; 2003–04 South-West Indian Ocean cyclone season; 2003–04 Australian region cyclone season

The 2003–04 South Pacific cyclone season was a below-average season with only three tropical cyclones occurring within the South Pacific to the east of 160°E. The season officially ran from November 1, 2003 to April 30, 2004 with the first disturbance of the season forming on December 4 and the last disturbance dissipating on April 23. (Note: An average season has nine tropical cyclones, about half of which become severe tropical cyclones.) (Note: RSMC Nadi warns on systems in the South Pacific which is located from the equator to 25°S and from 160°E to 120°W. TCWC Wellington warns on systems from 25°S to 40°S and from 160°E to 120°W) This is the period of the year when most tropical cyclones form within the South Pacific Ocean.

During the season at least 16 people were killed from tropical disturbances whilst overall damage was estimated at $218 million (2004 USD; $371 million 2026 USD). The most damaging tropical disturbance was Cyclone Heta which caused at least $211 million (2004 USD; $360 million 2026 USD) in damage to six different countries and left three dead. The deadliest tropical disturbance of the season was Tropical Depression 10F, which was responsible for eleven deaths and caused $2.74 million (2004 USD) in damage. Cyclone Ivy also caused 2 deaths and caused $4.17 million (2004 USD; $7.11 million 2026 USD) worth of damage to Vanuatu. As a result of the impacts caused by Heta and Ivy, the names were retired from the tropical cyclone naming lists.

Within the South Pacific, tropical cyclones are monitored by the Regional Specialized Meteorological Center (RSMC) in Nadi, Fiji, and the Tropical Cyclone Warning Center (TCWC) in Wellington, New Zealand. RSMC Nadi attaches a number and an F suffix to tropical disturbances that form in or move into the South Pacific. The United States Joint Typhoon Warning Center (JTWC) issues unofficial warnings within the South Pacific, designating tropical cyclones with a number and a P suffix. RSMC Nadi and TCWC Wellington both use the Australian Tropical Cyclone Intensity Scale, and measure windspeeds over a period of ten minutes, while the JTWC measures sustained winds over a period of one minute and uses the Saffir–Simpson Hurricane Scale.

== Systems ==
=== Severe Tropical Cyclone Heta ===
- Category 5 severe tropical cyclone (Australian scale)
- Category 5 tropical cyclone (SSHWS)
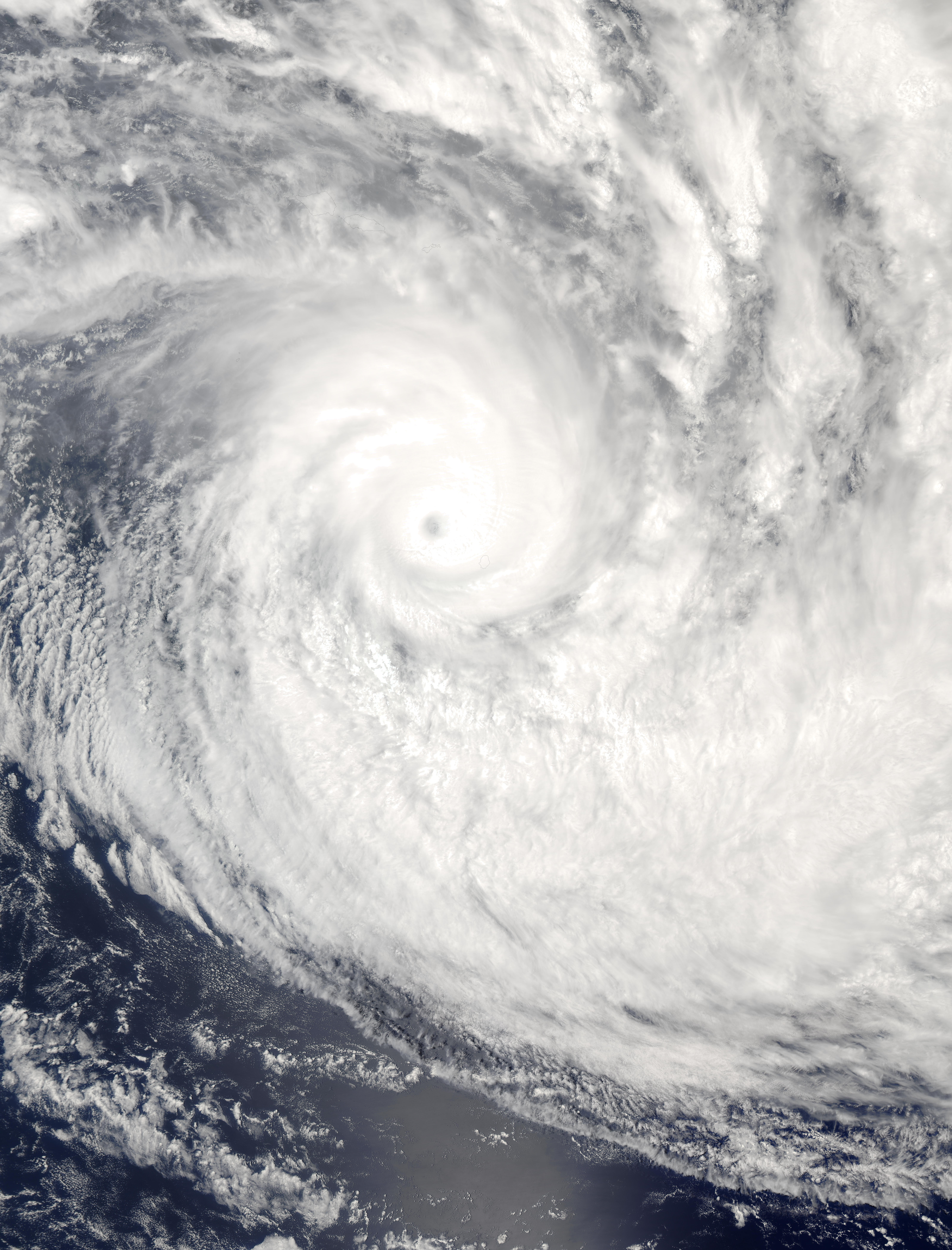
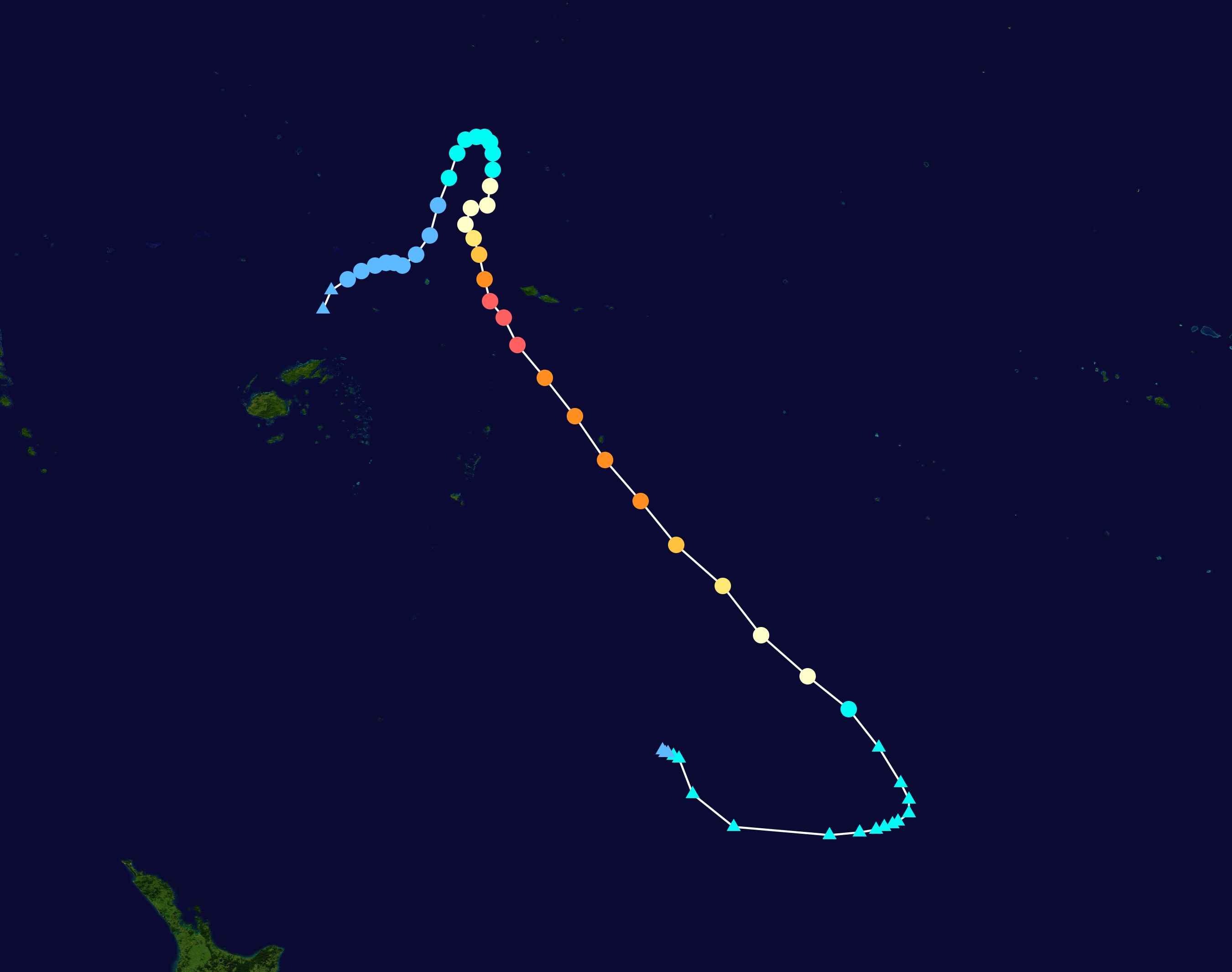
- Duration: December 28 – January 7
- Peak intensity: 215 km/h (130 mph) (10-min); 915 hPa (mbar)

Cyclone Heta developed in the South Pacific Ocean and reached cyclone-force winds on January 1, 2004. It struck the island of Niue with a much more direct blow on January 6. Heta's eyewall hit Niue almost exactly at the height of the storm's power. It caused extensive property damage throughout the island, and two people were killed. Efforts to rebuild from the storm in Niue lasted almost the entire year of 2004.

Heta caused American Samoa to declare a state of emergency (officially a "Declaration of Emergency" in American Samoan law) on January 7, and even though officially the storm never made landfall there, it necessitated the emergency evacuation of 140 people and was responsible for property damage.

The nation of Tonga was also affected by Heta, as the winds swept away trees that were needed for the country's food supply. However, Tonga did not receive a direct hit or suffer such extensive loss as Niue.

=== Severe Tropical Cyclone Ivy ===
- Category 4 severe tropical cyclone (Australian scale)
- Category 3 tropical cyclone (SSHWS)
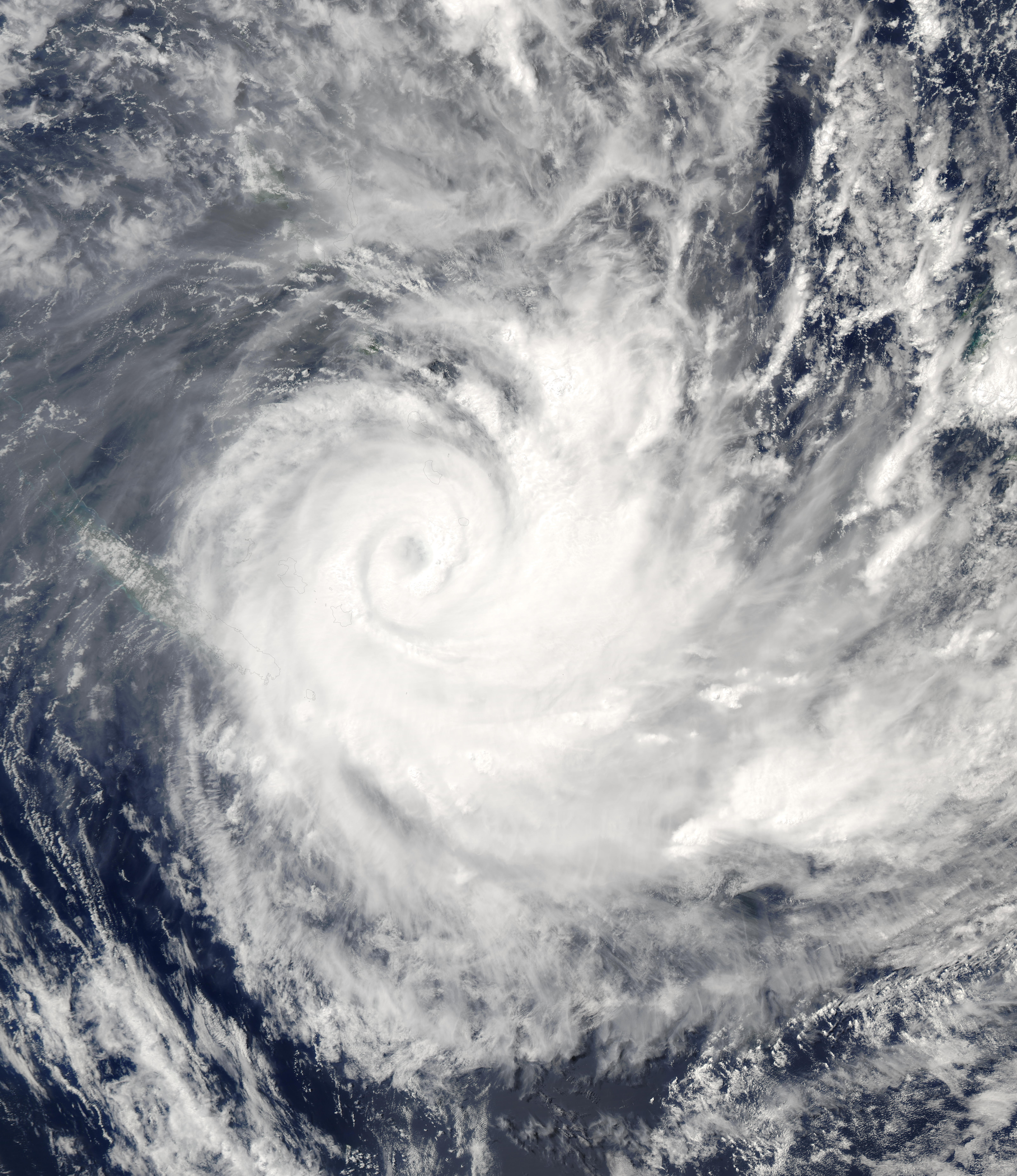
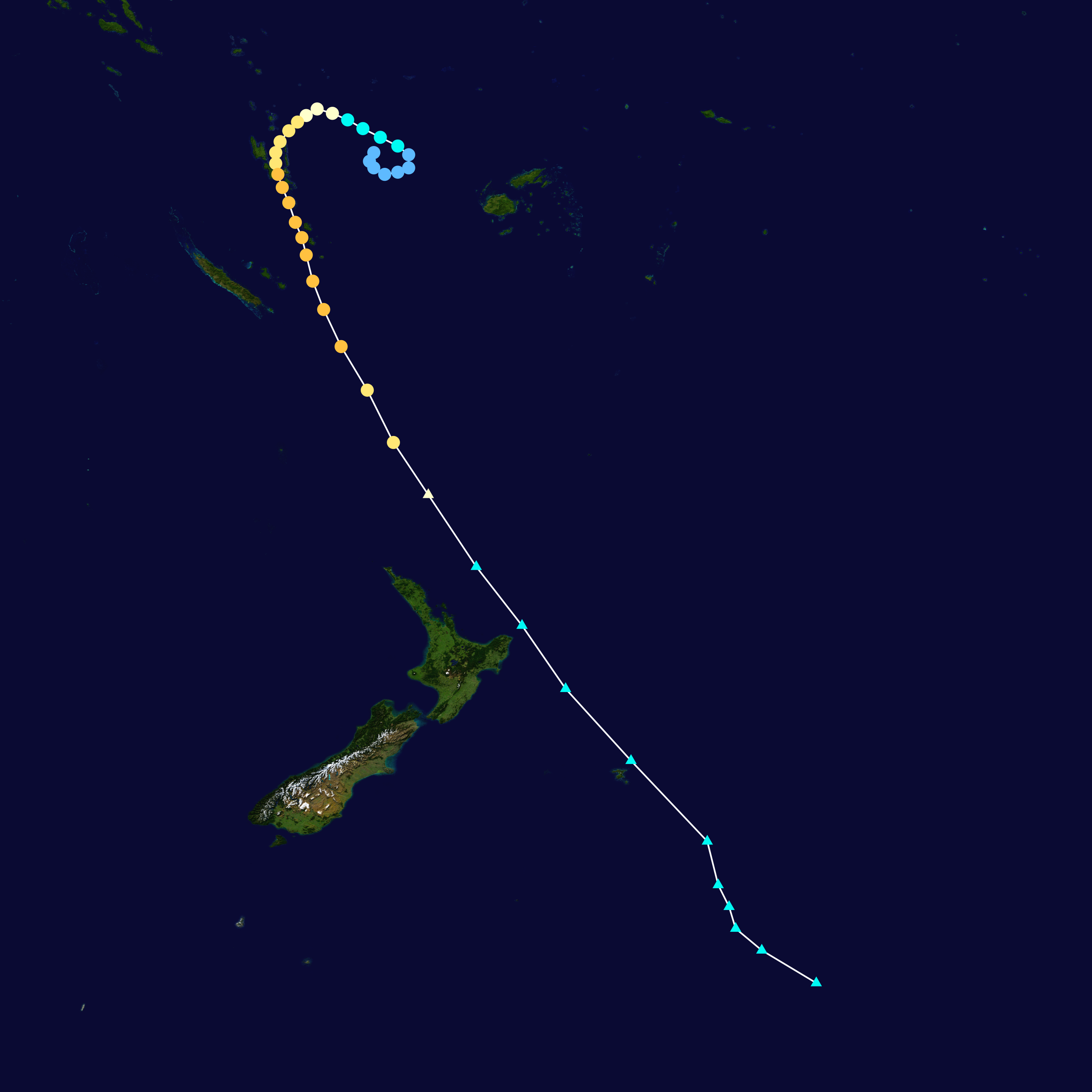
- Duration: February 21 – February 28
- Peak intensity: 165 km/h (105 mph) (10-min); 935 hPa (mbar)

Numbered 05F. Existed between February 21 and February 28. Caused heavy damage in Vanuatu.

=== Tropical Depression 06F ===
- Tropical depression (Australian scale)
- Duration: March 20 – March 22

Formed on March 20, dumped heavy rainfall in Vanuatu. 06F was last noted on March 22.

=== Tropical Cyclone Grace ===
- Category 2 tropical cyclone (Australian scale)
- Tropical storm (SSHWS)
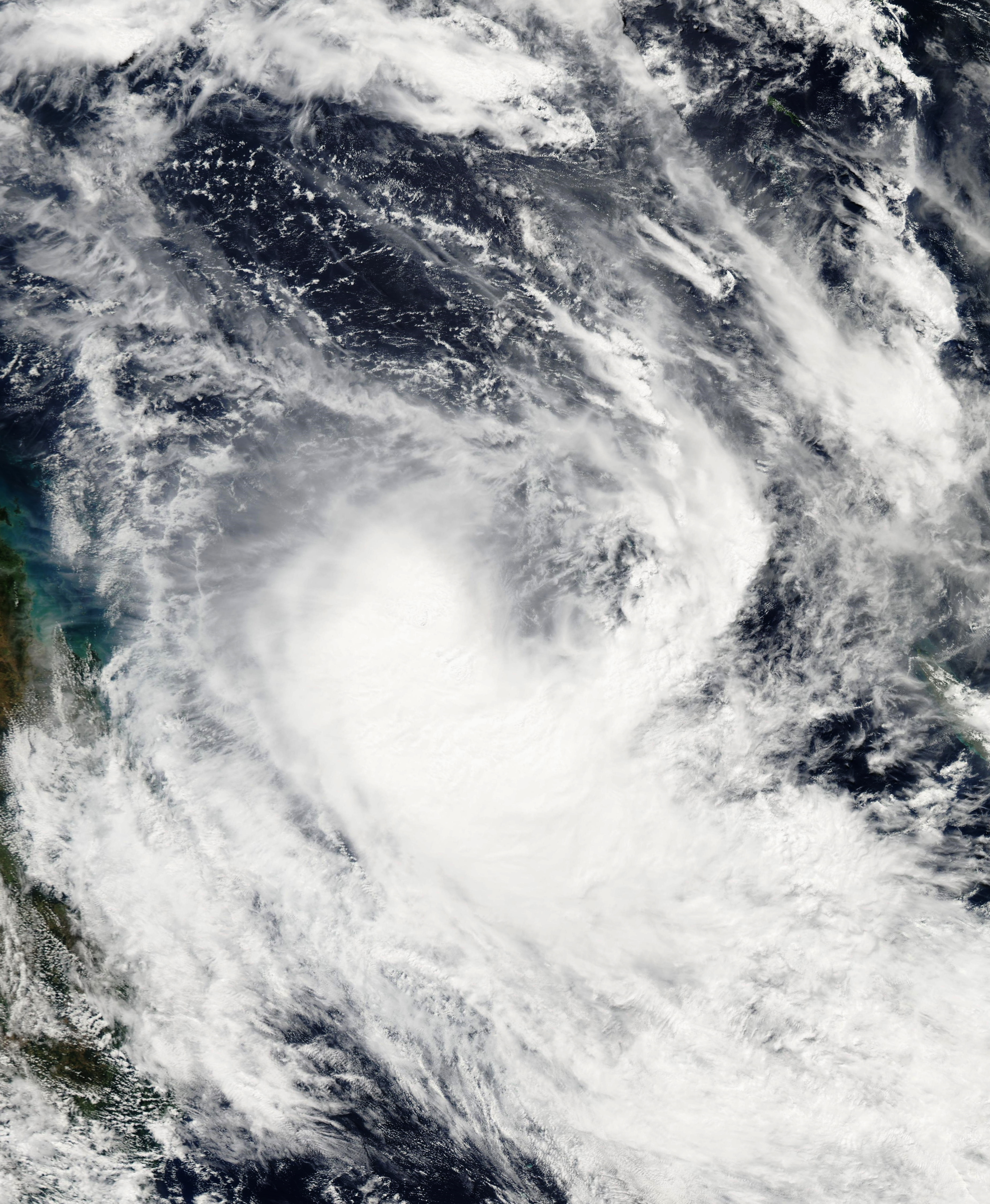
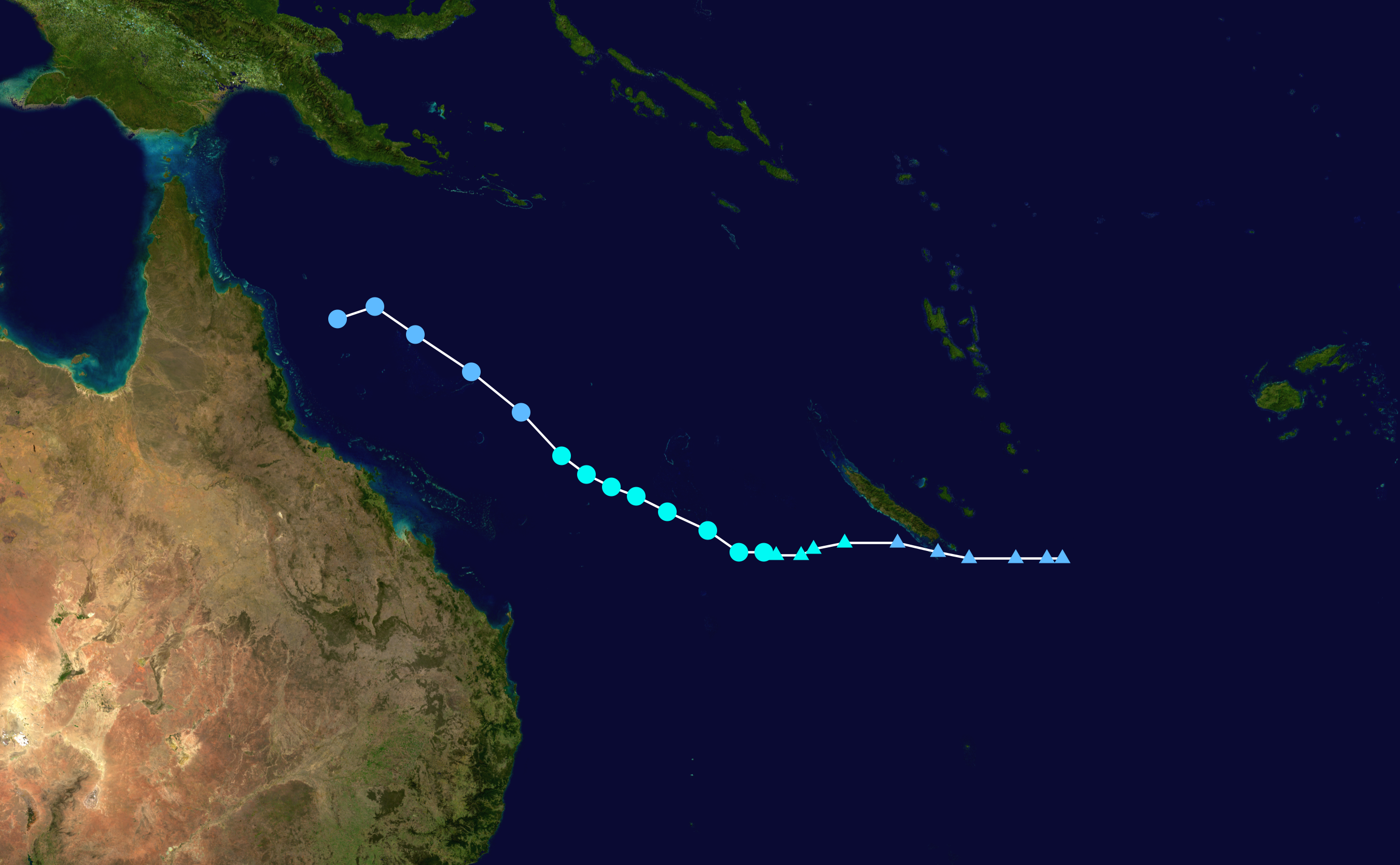
- Duration: March 21 – March 23
- Peak intensity: 95 km/h (60 mph) (10-min); 985 hPa (mbar)

Entered the region from the west on March 23, became extratropical the next day. Designated as 07F by Nadi.

=== Tropical Depression 08F ===
- Tropical depression (Australian scale)
- Duration: March 28 – April 1

Existed between March 28 and April 1.

=== Tropical Depression 09F ===
- Tropical depression (Australian scale)
- Duration: April 1 – April 3

Existed between April 1 and April 3.

=== Tropical Depression 10F ===
- Tropical depression (Australian scale)
- Tropical storm (SSHWS)
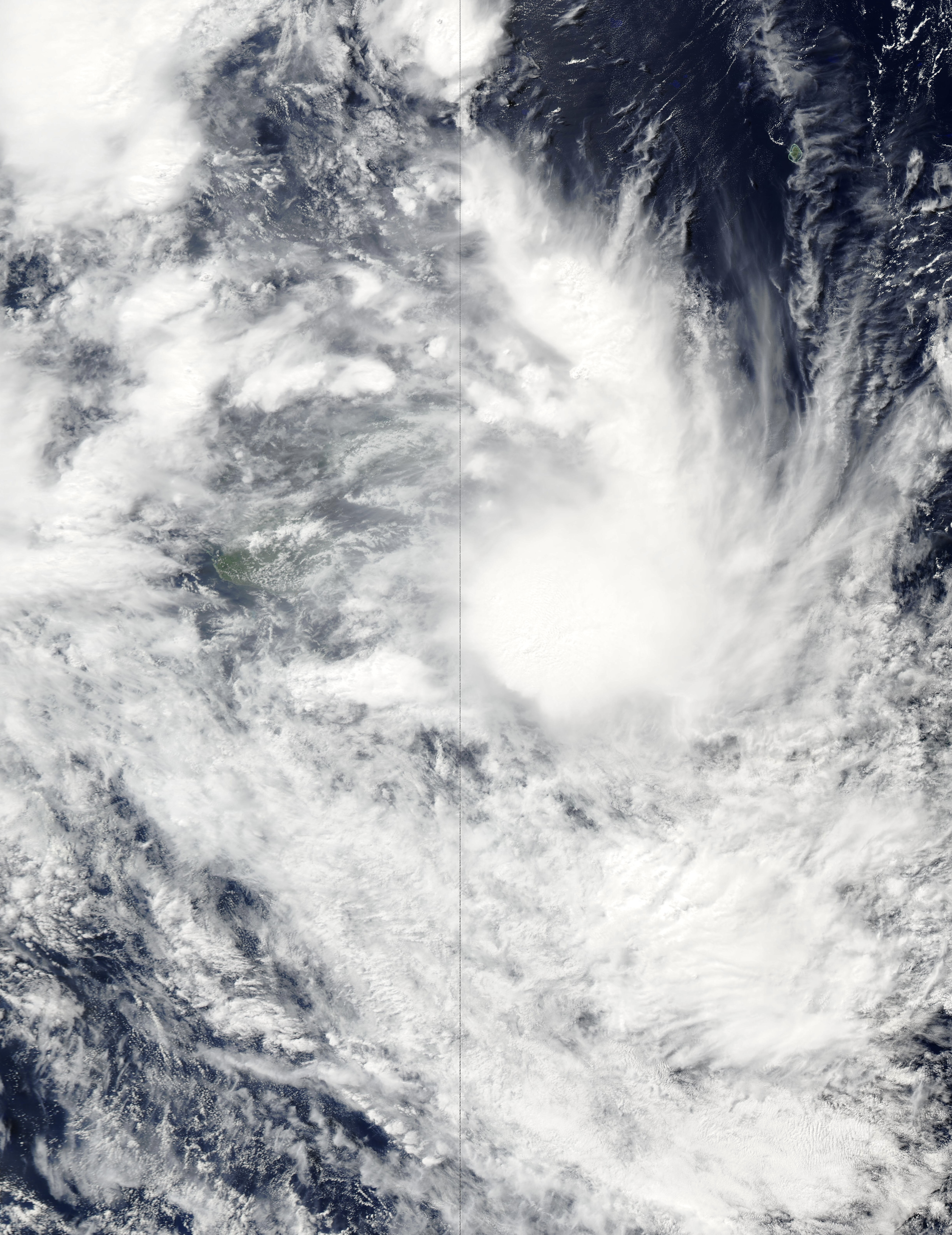
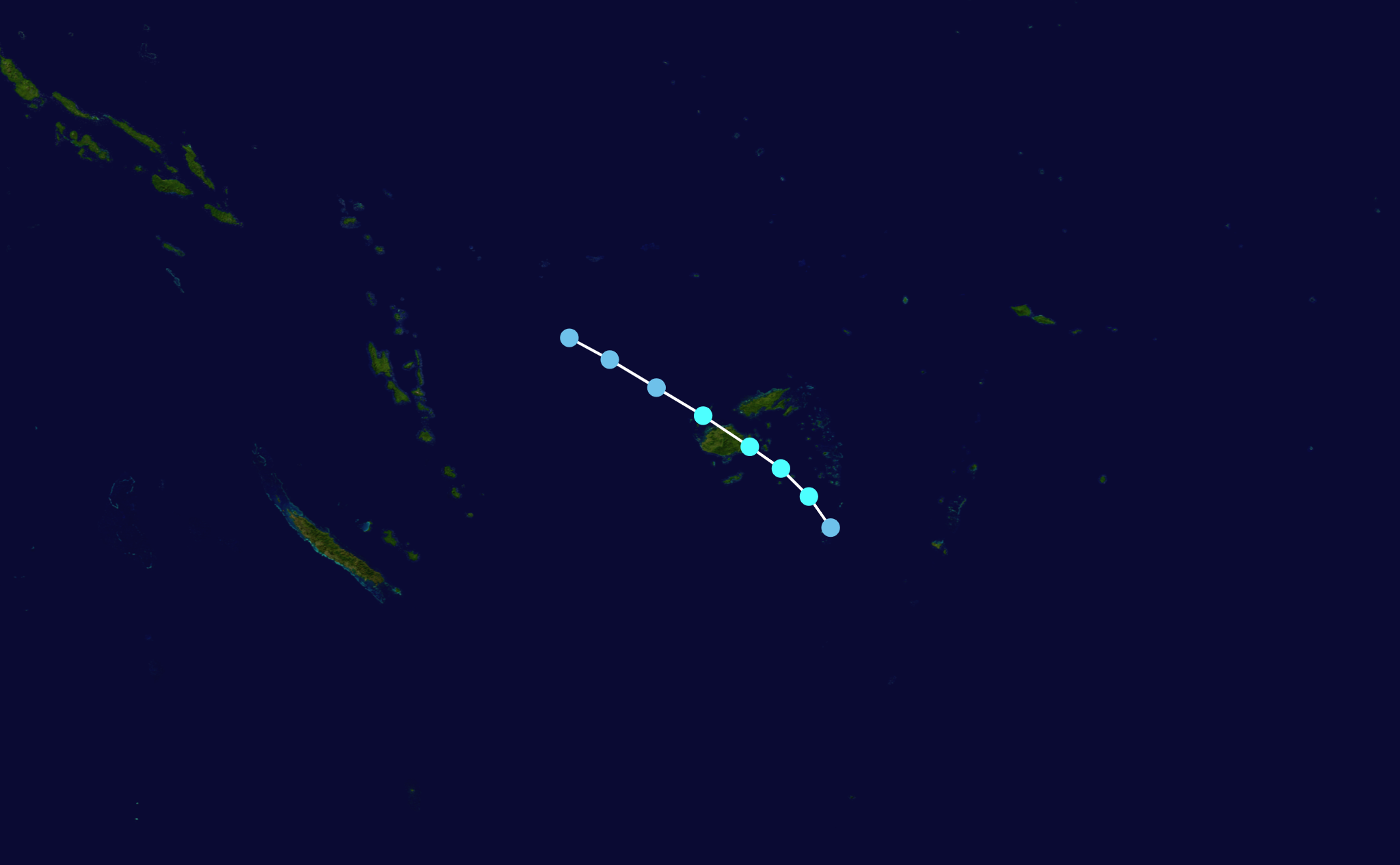
- Duration: April 5 – April 9
- Peak intensity: 55 km/h (35 mph) (10-min); 995 hPa (mbar)

Existed between April 6 and April 9. The storm was given the number 22P by the Joint Typhoon Warning Center. It was responsible for causing severe flooding to Fiji and 11 deaths. Damage from the flooding was estimated at US$2.6 million.

=== Tropical Depression 12F ===
- Tropical depression (Australian scale)
- Duration: April 7 – April 13

Formed on April 7, later caused severe flooding in Fiji. 12F was last noted on April 13.

=== Tropical Depression 13F ===
- Tropical depression (Australian scale)
- Duration: April 11 – April 13

During April 11 a weak tropical low moved into the South Pacific basin from the Australian region, and was designated as Tropical Disturbance 13F by RSMC Nadi later that day. 13F was last noted on April 13 as a Tropical Depression.

=== Other systems ===
The first numbered tropical disturbance of the season developed within a large area of atmospheric convection on December 4, to the northwest of the Fijian dependency of Rotuma. During that day the depression slowly moved west, before it was classified as a weak tropical depression during the next day. The system subsequently weakened and lost its organisation because of moderate to strong vertical windshear and was last noted during December 6.

Tropical Disturbance 02F was first noted by the FMS during December 16, within an environment conducive for further development, about 340 km (210 mi) to the west of Honiara in the Solomon Islands. Over the next few days, the system remained poorly organised and slow-moving within an area of moderate vertical windshear, before it was last noted by the FMS during December 20, as it entered the Australian region. Tropical Disturbance 04F was subsequently first noted within a broad area of low pressure by the FMS, while it was located on the border with the South Pacific basin, about 100 km (60 mi) to the south of Honiara in the Solomon Islands. The system was located in a moderate area of vertical windshear and was poorly organised with atmospheric convection confined to the system's eastern semicircle. The system subsequently moved south-eastwards and remained poorly organised, before it was last noted by the FMS later that day while it was located to the south of San Cristobal Island.

During April 6, the FMS reported that Tropical Depression 11F had developed within a monsoon trough, about 140 km (85 mi) to the north-east of Suva in Fiji. Over the next day, the system moved south-eastwards towards Tonga, before it was last noted by the FMS later that day, while it was located about 300 km (185 mi) to the southwest of Tongatapu in Tonga.

On April 18, RSMC Nadi reported that Tropical Disturbance 14F had developed within the monsoon trough, about 515 km (320 mi) to the northeast of Nukuʻalofa in Tonga. During that day, the disturbance moved through the Tongan archipelago, before it was last noted later that day.

During April 22, the FMS reported that Tropical Disturbance 15F had developed around 500 km (310 mi) to the northeast of Honiara in the Solomon Islands. Over the next couple of days, the system remained poorly organised and near stationary to the northeast of the Solomon Islands, before it was last noted during April 24.

== Season effects ==
This table lists all the storms that developed in the South Pacific to the east of longitude 160°E during the 2003–04 season.

Name	Dates	Peak intensity			Areas affected	Damage (USD)	Deaths	Ref(s).
Name	Dates	Category	Wind speed	Pressure	Areas affected	Damage (USD)	Deaths	Ref(s).
01F	December 4 – 6	Tropical Depression	Not Specified	1005 hPa (29.68 inHg)	None	None	None	
02F	December 16 – 20	Tropical Disturbance	Not Specified	1000 hPa (29.53 inHg)	Solomon Islands	None	None	
Heta	December 25 – January 8	Category 5 severe tropical cyclone	215 km/h (130 mph)	915 hPa (27.02 inHg)	Samoan Islands, Niue, Tonga, Wallis and Futuna	$225 million	3	
04F	December 29	Tropical Disturbance	Not Specified	1004 hPa (29.65 inHg)	Solomon Islands	None	None	
Ivy	February 21 – 28	Category 4 severe tropical cyclone	165 km/h (105 mph)	935 hPa (27.61 inHg)	Vanuatu, Solomon Islands, New Caledonia, New Zealand	$3.8 million	4	
06F	March 20 – 22	Tropical Depression	Not Specified	Not Specified	None	None	None	
Grace	March 21 – 23	Category 2 tropical cyclone	95 km/h (60 mph)	985 hPa (29.11 inHg)	None	None	None	
08F	March 28 – April 1	Tropical Depression	Not Specified	Not Specified	None	None	None	
09F	April 1 – 3	Tropical Depression	Not Specified	Not Specified	None	None	None	
10F	April 5 – 9	Tropical Depression	55 km/h (35 mph)	995 hPa (29.38 inHg)	Fiji	$4.17 million	11	
11F	April 6 – 7	Tropical Depression	Not Specified	Not Specified	None	None	None	
12F	April 7 – 13	Tropical Depression	Not Specified	Not Specified	Fiji	None	None	
13F	April 11 – 13	Tropical Depression	Not Specified	Not Specified	None	None	None	
14F	April 18 – 19	Tropical Disturbance	Not Specified	1006 hPa (29.71 inHg)	Tonga	None	None	
15F	April 22 – 24	Tropical Disturbance	Not Specified	1006 hPa (29.71 inHg)	None	None	None	
Season aggregates
15 systems	December 4 – April 24		215 km/h (130 mph)	915 hPa (27.02 inHg)		$387 million	16	

== See also ==
- List of Southern Hemisphere tropical cyclone seasons
- Tropical cyclones in 2004
- Atlantic hurricane seasons: 2003, 2004
- North Indian Ocean cyclone seasons: 2003, 2004
- Pacific hurricane seasons: 2003, 2004
- Pacific typhoon seasons: 2003, 2004
