= Tropical Depression 10F (2004) =

South Pacific tropical depression in 2004

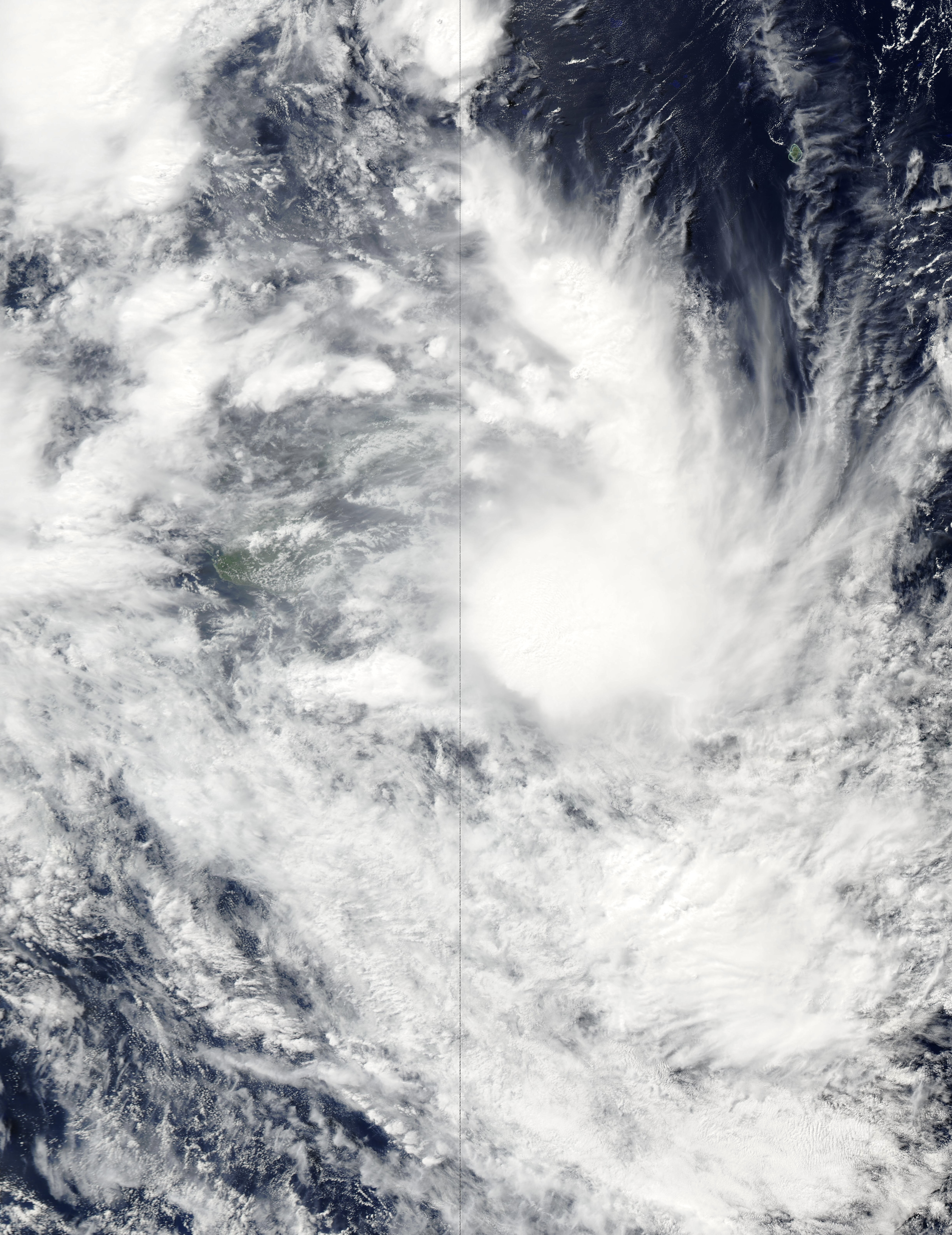
- Tropical Depression 10F on 7 April

Meteorological history
- Formed: 5 April 2004
- Dissipated: 9 April 2004

Tropical depression
- 10-minute sustained (FMS)
- Highest winds: 55 km/h (35 mph)

Tropical storm
- 1-minute sustained (SSHWS/JTWC)
- Highest winds: 65 km/h (40 mph)
- Lowest pressure: 995 hPa (mbar); 29.38 inHg

Overall effects
- Fatalities: 11 total
- Damage: $4.17 million (2004 USD)
- Areas affected: Fiji
- Part of the 2003–04 South Pacific cyclone season

Tropical Depression 10F (JTWC designation: 22P) was a small tropical depression that became the deadliest tropical cyclone of the 2004 season, claiming 11 lives in the Fiji islands.

== Meteorological history ==
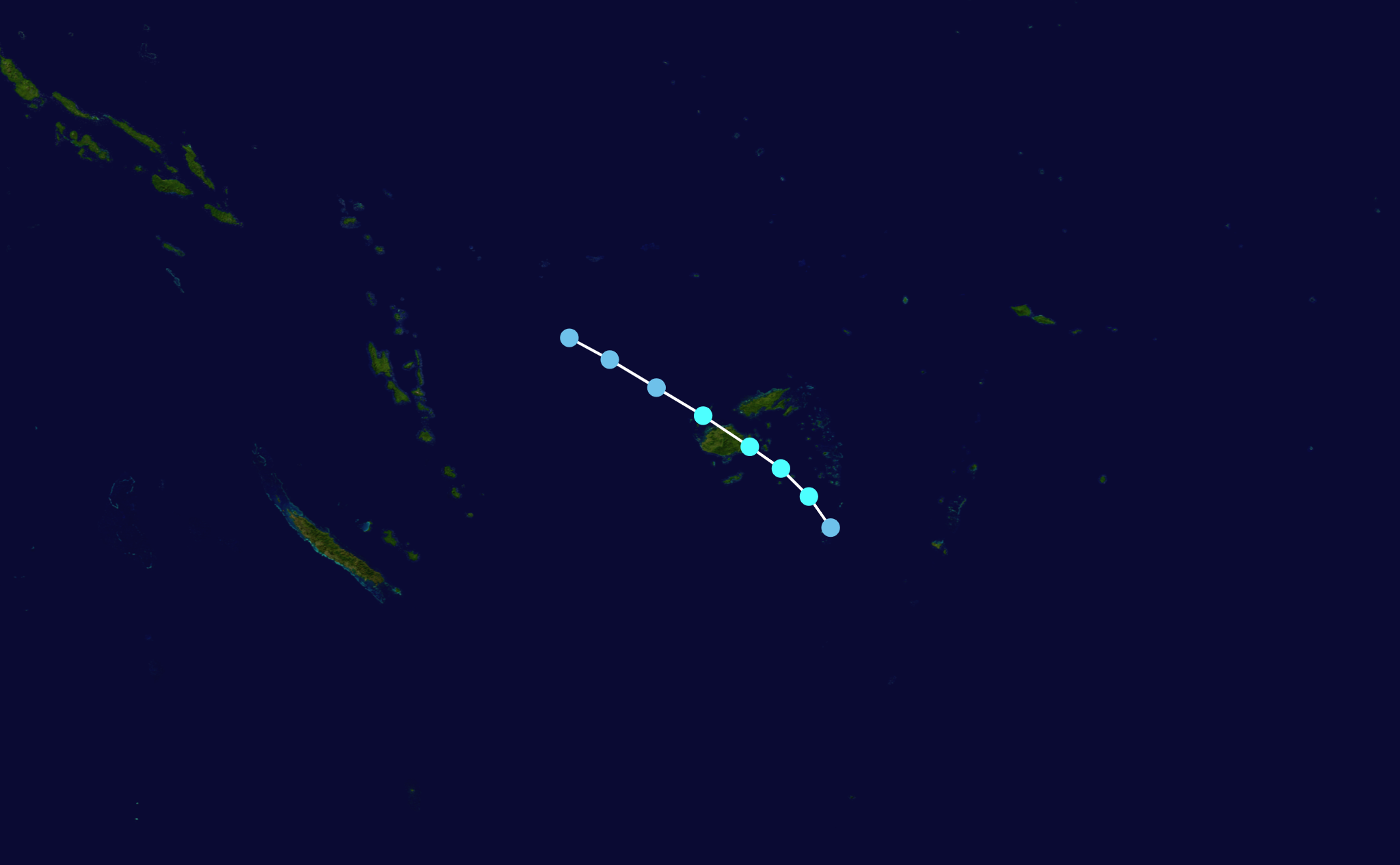
Map plotting the storm's track and intensity, according to the Saffir–Simpson scale Map key Saffir–Simpson scale Tropical depression (≤38 mph, ≤62 km/h) Tropical storm (39–73 mph, 63–118 km/h) Category 1 (74–95 mph, 119–153 km/h) Category 2 (96–110 mph, 154–177 km/h) Category 3 (111–129 mph, 178–208 km/h) Category 4 (130–156 mph, 209–251 km/h) Category 5 (≥157 mph, ≥252 km/h) Unknown Storm type Tropical cyclone Subtropical cyclone Extratropical cyclone, remnant low, tropical disturbance, or monsoon depression

Tropical Depression 10F was first identified early on April 5 by the Regional Specialized Meteorological Center in Nadi, Fiji as a weak tropical disturbance. The disturbance at this time was located about 700 km (435 mi) to the north of Port Vila, Vanuatu and was embedded within a monsoon trough that extended from the Solomon Islands to the north of Fiji. Major convection around the system was displaced to the north and north east of the low level circulation center. The system was located within a favorable area to develop further with sea surface temperatures of over 30 °C and light vertical windshear.

== Preparations and impact ==
Thousands of tourists holidaying in Fiji were asked to remain indoors while the tropical depression affected Fiji with domestic flights in and out of Fiji canceled. People were also advised not to go out to sea and were advised to take precautions. Public servants were also told to go home after ensuring that emergency procedures were in place, while schools were closed so that students could get home safely.

Tropical Depression 15F brought strong winds heavy rain and flooding to Viti Levu and the Yasawa and Mamanuca group of islands. The depression caused a total of F$5.6 million (US$4.17 million) in damage, while at least 11 people were confirmed dead. Damage and destruction caused by the depression was confined to a thin strip where the tropical depression had passed. Many roads and bridges in Ba and Rakiraki were flooded causing landslides and severe damage to infrastructure and public utilities was reported. Family homes were severely damaged or were destroyed by being blown or washed away. Crops were also severely damaged or destroyed. The business community also suffered severely as the kings road between Ra and Tailevu was closed to all traffic for several days as parts of the road were washed away. Communications were also severely affected at the height of the storm.

The National Disaster Management Committee of Fiji initially reported on April 11 that seven people had died from the tropical depression with nine people missing.

A woman was swept away while trying to cross the flooded Wainimala River in Naitasiri province, while another women was swept off a flooded bridge in Rakiraki.

By April 12, the Fijian red cross had distributed more than $80,000 F$80,000 (US$40,000) worth of food parcels, however the food parcels were only expected last for two weeks.

== See also ==
- 2003-04 South Pacific cyclone season
- Timeline of the 2003-04 South Pacific cyclone season
