= Cyclone Ivy =

Category 4 South Pacific cyclone in 2004

Severe Tropical Cyclone Ivy
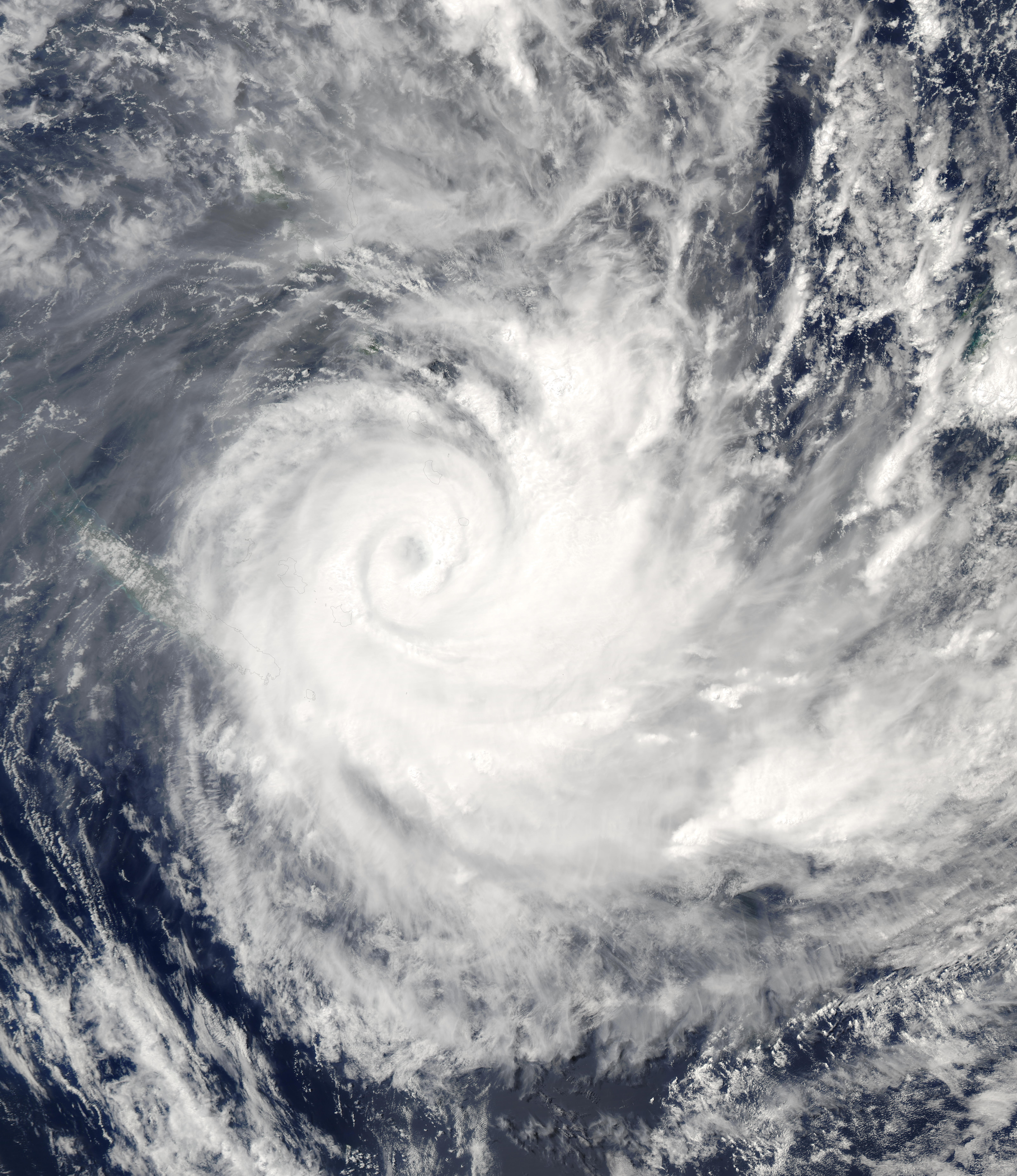
- Ivy shortly after peak intensity on 27 February

Meteorological history
- Formed: 21 February 2004
- Extratropical: 28 February 2004
- Dissipated: 2 March 2004

Category 4 severe tropical cyclone
- 10-minute sustained (FMS)
- Highest winds: 165 km/h (105 mph)
- Lowest pressure: 935 hPa (mbar); 27.61 inHg

Category 3-equivalent tropical cyclone
- 1-minute sustained (SSHWS/JTWC)
- Highest winds: 195 km/h (120 mph)
- Lowest pressure: 938 hPa (mbar); 27.70 inHg

Overall effects
- Fatalities: 4 reported
- Damage: $3.8 million (2004 USD)
- Areas affected: Vanuatu, Solomon Islands, New Caledonia, and New Zealand
- IBTrACS
- Part of the 2003–04 South Pacific cyclone season

Severe Tropical Cyclone Ivy (Fiji Meteorological Service designation: 05F, Joint Typhoon Warning Center designation: 13P) was a tropical cyclone that affected about 25% of the population of Vanuatu in February 2004. It was first classified as a tropical disturbance on 21 February between Vanuatu and Fiji. The system tracked northwestward, gradually organizing and intensifying. After attaining tropical storm status on 23 February, Ivy strengthened more quickly as it turned southwestward toward Vanuatu. It attained peak winds of 165 km/h (103 mph) while moving over Vanuatu, making it an intense Category 4 cyclone on the Australian Region Tropical Cyclone Intensity Scale. By the time it passed through Vanuatu, Ivy had turned southeastward, and it gradually weakened while accelerating. After becoming extratropical on 28 February, it passed just east of New Zealand and eventually dissipated on 2 March.

The third significant cyclone in 14 months to affect the region, Ivy produced heavy rainfall and high winds in Vanuatu. Due to advance warning, only two people were killed, and several people were injured. The high winds damaged about 11,000 houses, leaving many people homeless. The cyclone passed very close to the Vanuatu capital city of Port Vila, forcing the evacuation of about 2,000 people and shutting down the main port. Cyclone Ivy also affected the Solomon Islands and New Caledonia with rainfall, and later it produced high waves in New Zealand that killed two people. Because of its severe damage on Vanuatu, the name Ivy was retired following its usage.

== Meteorological history ==
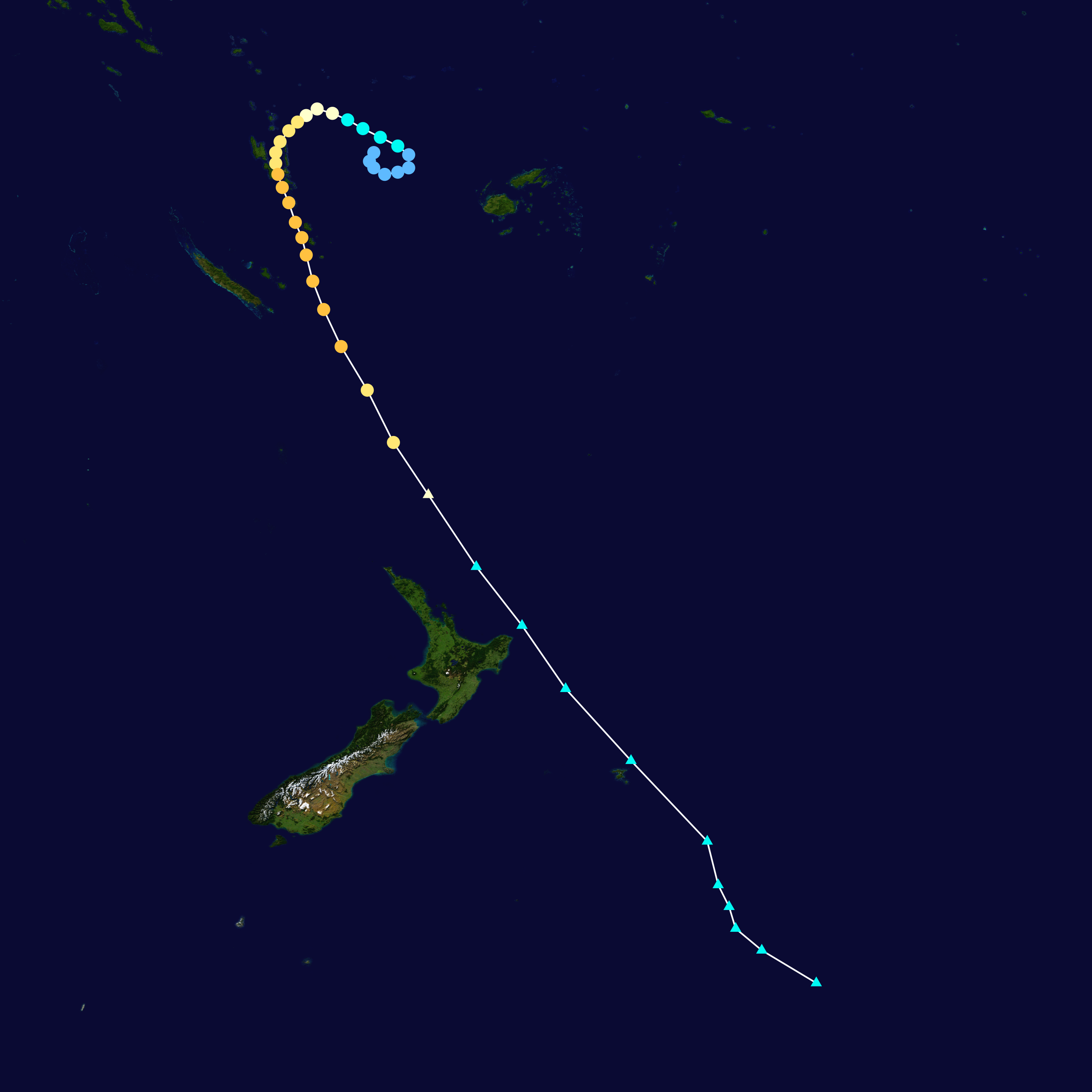
Map plotting the storm's track and intensity, according to the Saffir–Simpson scale Map key Saffir–Simpson scale Tropical depression (≤38 mph, ≤62 km/h) Tropical storm (39–73 mph, 63–118 km/h) Category 1 (74–95 mph, 119–153 km/h) Category 2 (96–110 mph, 154–177 km/h) Category 3 (111–129 mph, 178–208 km/h) Category 4 (130–156 mph, 209–251 km/h) Category 5 (≥157 mph, ≥252 km/h) Unknown Storm type Tropical cyclone Subtropical cyclone Extratropical cyclone, remnant low, tropical disturbance, or monsoon depression

In the middle of February 2004, a monsoon trough formed in the southwest Pacific Ocean during the middle of a Madden–Julian oscillation pulse. A low-pressure area developed along the trough, and the Fiji Meteorological Service (FMS) designated it Tropical Disturbance 5F on 21 February about halfway between Vanuatu and Fiji. Initially, the system was moving little and had a circulation that was detached from the primary area of convection. On 22 February, after the thunderstorms increased, the Joint Typhoon Warning Center (JTWC) initiated advisories on the disturbance with the designation Tropical Cyclone 13P. Shortly thereafter, the FMS reported that the disturbance developed into a tropical depression, although the convection was transient and displaced from the circulation. The system tracked west-northwestward, due to a ridge located to its south. With low wind shear and good outflow, the system gradually organized, with the circulation becoming situated underneath the convection. At 0300 UTC on 23 February, the FMS upgraded it to a tropical cyclone and gave it the name Ivy while the storm was about 510 km (320 mi) northeast of Port Vila, Vanuatu.

After being named, Ivy quickly intensified after its convection was drawn into the circulation. Late on 23 February, the JTWC upgraded Ivy to the equivalent of a Category 1 hurricane on the Saffir–Simpson scale, and the FMS followed suit the following day by upgrading Ivy to a severe tropical cyclone as continued favourable conditions allowed for rapid deepening. On 24 February, the cyclone began a turn to the southwest as it moved around the ridge, and the next day it turned to the south toward Vanuatu as an approaching shortwave trough passed to the south and created a weakness in the ridge. A nearby upper-level low temporarily cut off outflow, although once it moved further away the low enhanced ventilation. Strengthening continued and, late on 25 February, the FMS reported that Ivy attained peak 10–minute sustained winds of 165 km/h (103 mph) over the Vanuatu archipelago; this made it a Category 4 on the Australian Region Tropical Cyclone Intensity Scale. Around the same time, the JTWC estimated peak 1–minute sustained winds of 195 km/h (121 mph), after a 19 km (12 mi) eye developed.

After passing slowly through Vanuatu, Ivy began accelerating to the southeast and its eye passed very close to the capital city of Port Vila, after moving over the island of Epi. As the cyclone moved away from the island group, it underwent an eyewall replacement cycle. In addition, the combination of cooler water temperatures, greater wind shear, less outflow, and land interaction with Vanuatu caused gradual weakening. Late on 27 February, Ivy entered the area of warning responsibility of New Zealand's MetService. The convection rapidly diminished and left the circulation exposed, and Ivy transitioned into an extratropical cyclone on 28 February. It remained strong and maintained a well-defined circulation as it passed just east of East Cape, New Zealand. Continuing southeastward, the extratropical remnants crossed the International Date Line on 29 February, and Ivy dissipated about 1,800 km (1,120 mi) southeast of New Zealand on 2 March.

== Preparations and impact ==
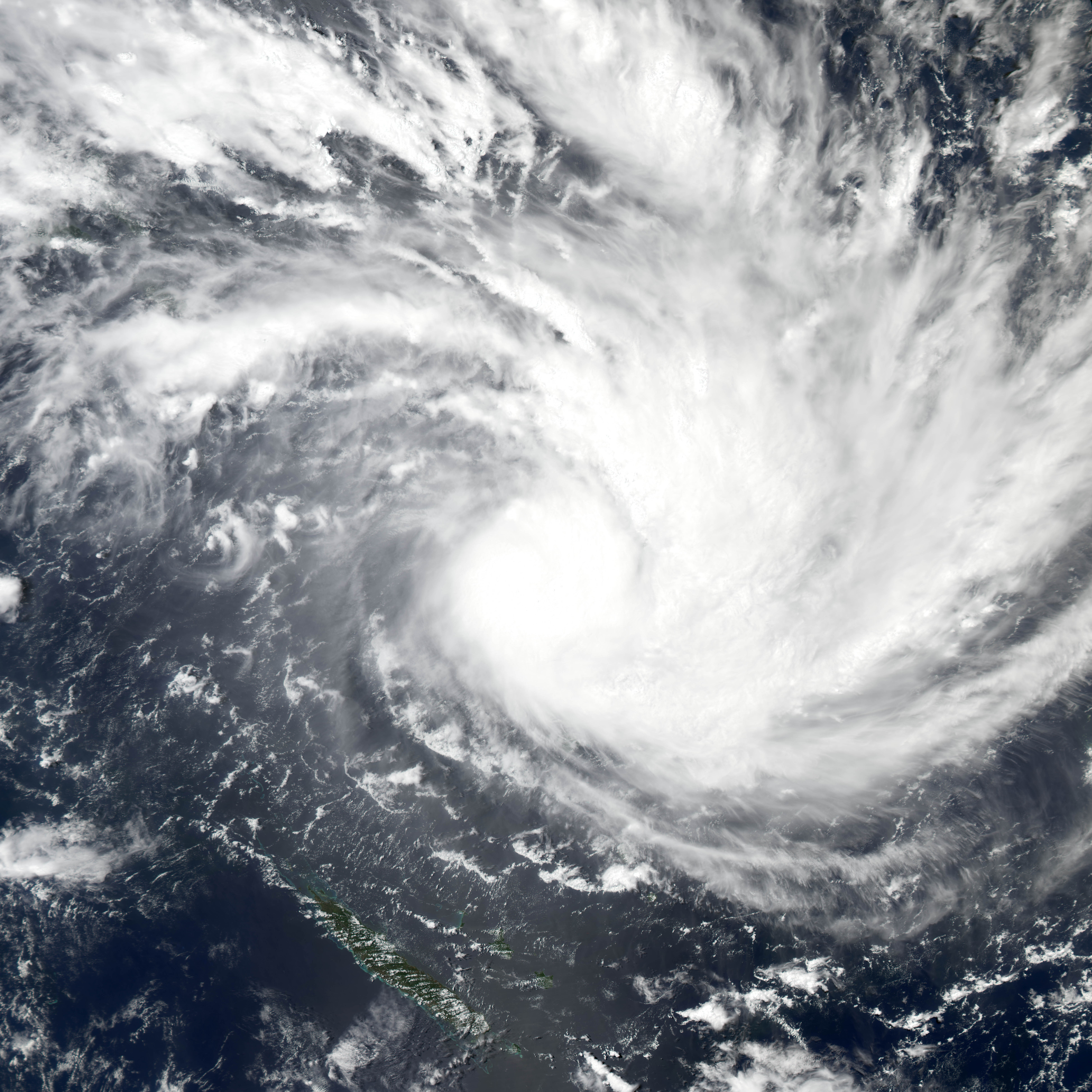
Satellite image of Ivy near Vanuatu on 25 February

While Ivy was reaching peak intensity, it passed through Vanuatu, becoming the third major cyclone in 14 months to affect the region, after Cyclone Zoe and Cyclone Gina. Its threat prompted over 2,000 people in Port Vila to evacuate. While Ivy moved through the country, a station on Anatom island recorded winds of 130 km/h (81 mph), which were the highest sustained winds observed in the nation. In addition, the cyclone dropped heavy rainfall, reaching 254.4 mm (10.02 in) at Bauerfield International Airport in Port Vila. The central area of deep convection moved across every island in the archipelago.

As the cyclone moved through Vanuatu, it cut off communications between the various islands, and also knocked Radio Vanuatu offline. Overall there was widespread moderate damage, with small areas of heavier damage. The cyclone affected more than 54,000 people – about 25% of the population – on various islands, including Paama, Epi, Ambrym, eastern Malekula, northern Aoba, and northern Maewo. On Ambrym island, the winds wrecked the roofs of houses and downed trees and vegetables. Overall, about 11,000 houses were damaged, and a large proportion of the 24,000 people in Ivy's path became homeless due to the destruction of their houses, with many buildings made of iron and bamboo wrecked. In addition, the winds downed trees and power lines.

Heavy damage occurred in the capital city of Port Vila, where flooding washed out small bridges. Strong waves wrecked the main port there and also capsized two boats. High winds downed trees and blocked roads across the capital, with 70% of the nation's roads affected. Several people were injured due to flying debris, and one person was severely injured due to the storm. The high winds affected 80% of the nation's food crops, including the loss of much of the mango and banana crops as well as the ruination of about 75% of the coconut and cocoa crops. The latter loss was significant due to its status as a cash crop. The cyclone damaged 90% of the water facilities across the archipelago. It also damaged about 60% of the health centers, as well as 112 schools, some of which were completely destroyed. Monetary damage was estimated at VT427.6 million (2004 VUV, $3.8 million 2004 USD). Due to advance warning, there were only two deaths in Vanuatu, including one when a landslide killed a woman on Malakula island.

In addition to affecting Vanuatu, Ivy produced heavy rainfall in Tikopia and Anuta, two small islands in the southeastern Solomon Islands. Later, intense rainbands spread across the Loyalty Islands in New Caledonia. Along the Bay of Plenty in New Zealand, the extratropical remnants of Ivy produced high waves that killed two people in Whakatāne. The storm produced a 1 in 10 year storm surge as it passed the country that peaked at 1.04 m (3.4 ft) at Omaio. The surge, in combination with waves, reached about 5 m (16 ft) at Papamoa, based on the position of debris on the beach. Wind gusts reached 79.7 km/h (49.5 mph) at the Whakatane Airport, and the combination of winds and waves produced beach erosion along the coast.

== Aftermath ==
The local Red Cross offices in Port Vila and Luganville prepared general relief supplies before the storm's arrival, including tents, tool kits, and first aid units. By four days after the cyclone's passage, the main wharf in Port Vila was re-opened and the two sunken boats were removed. Additionally, the evacuees were allowed to return to their homes, and communications between the various islands were restored. The Red Cross distributed various relief supplies to the affected citizens, including candles, matches, water, and blankets. By about two weeks after the storm, about 30,000 household relief packages were distributed. The Vanuatu government allocated VT25 million (2004 VUV, $236,000 2004 USD) for the affected citizens. Overall, the cyclone severely affected the daily lives of the Vanuatu citizens. On Tanna island, the cyclone's passage produced a malaria outbreak.

In the immediate aftermath, the New Zealand Red Cross provided $10,000 (2004 NZD) for essential relief supplies. In addition, the New Zealand government provided $70,000 for assistance in the most affected areas, after the country's Air Force dispatched a plane over Vanuatu to determine the extent of damage. The Government of Australia similarly sent a helicopter reconnaissance mission to determine damage, as well as two planes with $200,000 (2004 AUD) in relief supplies, including 2,400 tarps, 2,600 water containers, and 5,200 packets of water purification tablets. The French government also sent a helicopter and assistance as per the 1992 FRANZ Agreement between New Zealand, Australia, and France.

Due to the severity of damage wrought by the cyclone, the World Meteorological Organization retired the name Ivy following its usage and replaced it with Irene. Ivy was retired along with earlier Cyclone Heta; the two were the only named storms to form within the basin that season.

== See also ==
- List of retired South Pacific tropical cyclone names
