= List of ambassadors of New Zealand =

This is a list of ambassadors and high commissioners sent by New Zealand as diplomatic representatives to other countries or to international organisations.

Host country	Head of mission from New Zealand	
Afghanistan	Mike Walsh	
Albania	Jackie Frizelle	
Algeria	Amy Laurenson	
American Samoa	Si'alei van Toor	
Argentina	Vacant	List
Australia	Andrew Needs	List
Austria	Andrew Williams	
Bahrain	Barney Riley	
Bangladesh	David Pine	
Barbados	Vacant	List
Belarus	Sarah Walsh	
Belgium	Diana Reaich	List
Bolivia	Linda Te Puni	
Bosnia and Herzegovina	Jackie Frizelle	
Botswana	Philip Hewitt	
Brazil	Richard Prendergast	List
Brunei	Pam Dunn	
Cambodia	Jonathan Kings	
Canada	Martin Harvey	List
Chile	Linda Te Puni	List
China	Clare Fearnley	List
Colombia	Nicci Stilwell	
Cook Islands	Catherine Graham	
Croatia	Jackie Frizelle	
Cuba	Sara Meymand	
Cyprus	Jackie Frizelle	
Czech Republic	Craig Hawke	
Denmark	David Taylor	
Ecuador	Linda Te Puni	
Egypt	Amy Laurenson	
El Salvador	Sara Meymand	
Eritrea		
Estonia	Alana Hudson	
Eswatini	Philip Hewitt	
Ethiopia	Michael Upton	
European Union	Carl Reaich	
Fiji	Charlotte Darlow	List
Finland	David Taylor	
France	Caroline Bilkey	List
Georgia	Alana Hudson	
Germany	Craig Hawke	List
Ghana	Michael Upton	
Greece	Jackie Frizelle	
Guatemala	Sara Meymand	
Guyana	Vacant	
Holy See	Nigel Fyfe	
Hungary	Andrew Williams	
Iceland	David Taylor	
India	Patrick Rata	List
Indonesia	Kevin Burnett	List
Iran	Mike Walsh	List
Ireland	Trevor Mallard	
Israel	Zoe Coulson-Sinclair	
Italy	Jackie Frizelle	List
Jamaica	Vacant	
Japan	Hamish Cooper	List
Jordan	Zoe Coulson-Sinclair	
Kazakhstan	Sarah Walsh	
Kenya	Michael Upton	
Kiribati	André van der Walt	List
North Korea	Philip Turner	
South Korea	Philip Turner	List
Kuwait	Barney Riley	
Kyrgyzstan	Sarah Walsh	
Laos	Jonathan Kings	
Latvia	Alana Hudson	
Lebanon	Amy Laurenson	
Lesotho	Malcolm McGoun	
Lithuania	Alana Hudson	
Luxembourg	Diana Reaich	
Malaysia	Pam Dunn	List
Maldives	Michael Appleton	
Mali		
Malta	Nigel Fyfe	
Marshall Islands	Michael Ketchen	
Mauritius	Emma Dunlop-Bennett	
Mexico	Sara Meymand	List
Federated States of Micronesia	Michael Ketchen	
Mongolia	Clare Fearnley	
Morocco	Nigel Fyfe	
Mozambique	Emma Dunlop-Bennett	
Myanmar	Peter Rider	
Namibia	Emma Dunlop-Bennett	
Nauru	Richard Griffith	
Nepal	David Pine	
Netherlands	Susannah Gordon	List
Nigeria	Michael Upton	
Niue	Helen Tunnah	
Norway	David Taylor	
Oman	Barney Riley	
Palau	Michael Ketchen	
Panama	Sara Meymand	
Pakistan	Mike Walsh	
Papua New Guinea	Phillip Taula	List
Peru	Linda Te Puni	
Philippines	Peter Kell	List
Poland	Alana Hudson	List
Portugal	Caroline Bilkey	
Qatar	Matthew Hawkins	
Romania	Diana Reaich	
Russia	Sarah Walsh	List
Samoa	Si'alei van Toor	List
Saudi Arabia	Barney Riley	List
Serbia	Jackie Frizelle	
Singapore	Jo Tyndall	List
Slovakia	Andrew Williams	
Slovenia	Andrew Williams	
Solomon Islands	Jonathan Schwass	List
South Africa	Philip Hewitt	List
Spain	Nigel Fyfe	List
Sri Lanka	Michael Appleton	
Sweden	David Taylor	
Switzerland	Craig Hawke	
Tanzania	Malcolm McGoun	
Thailand	Jonathan Kings	List
Timor-Leste	Philip Hewitt	List
Tonga	Matthew Howell	List
Trinidad and Tobago	Vacant	
Turkey	Zoe Coulson-Sinclair	List
Turkmenistan	Sarah Walsh	
Tuvalu	Matthew Howell	
Uganda		
Ukraine	Alana Hudson	
United Arab Emirates	Matthew Hawkins	
United Kingdom	Vacant	List
United States	Bede Corry	List
Uruguay	Vacant	
Uzbekistan	Sarah Walsh	
Vanuatu	Nicci Simmonds	List
Venezuela	Sara Meymand	
Vietnam	Tredene Dobson	List
Zambia	Emma Dunlop-Bennett	
Zimbabwe		

== International organisations ==
Organisation	Representative
European Union	Carl Reaich
OECD	Caroline Bilkey
UNESCO	Linda Te Puni
United Nations	Carolyn Schwalger (New York); Lucy Duncan (Geneva); Brian Hewson (Vienna)
World Trade Organization; World Intellectual Property Organization; United Nations Conference on Trade and Development	Clare Kelly
Food and Agriculture Organization	Anthony George Simpson

== Argentina ==
The embassy is located in Buenos Aires, Argentina's capital city. New Zealand has maintained a resident ambassador in Argentina since 1998. The Ambassador to Argentina is concurrently accredited to Paraguay and Uruguay.

=== List of heads of mission ===
==== Ambassadors to Argentina ====
===== Non-resident ambassadors, resident in Lima =====
- Peter Bennett (1987–1988)
- Barry Brooks (1988–1990)

===== Non-resident ambassadors, resident in Santiago =====
- Paul Tipping (1990–1992)
- Frank Wilson (1992–1996)
- David McKee (1996–1998)

===== Resident ambassadors =====
- Caroline Forsyth (1998–2001)
- Carl Worker (2001–2005)
- Lucy Duncan (2005–present)

== Belgium ==
The embassy is located in Brussels, Belgium's capital city. New Zealand has maintained a resident ambassador in Belgium since 1967. The Ambassador to Belgium is concurrently accredited to Luxembourg and the European Union.

=== List of heads of mission ===
==== Consuls to Belgium ====
- Ken Piddington (1963–1964)
- Ted Farnon (1964–1965)

==== Ambassadors to Belgium ====
===== Non-resident ambassadors, resident in France =====
- Dick Hutchens (1965–1967)

===== Resident ambassadors =====
- Merwyn Norrish (1967–1973)
- Ian Stewart (1973–1977)
- Graham Ansell (1977–1981)
- John G. McArthur (1981–1983)
- Terence O'Brien (1983–1986)
- Gerry Thompson (1986–1990)
- David Gamble (1990–1994)
- Derek Leask (1994–1999)
- Dell Higgie (1999–2003)
- Wade Armstrong (2003–2007)
- Peter Kennedy (2007–2012)
- Vangelis Vitalis (2012)
- Paula Wilson (2012-2016)
- Greg Andrews (2016–present)

== Brazil ==
New Zealand's foremost diplomatic representative in the Federative Republic of Brazil, and in charge of New Zealand's diplomatic mission in Brazil.

The embassy is located in Brasília, Brazil's capital city. New Zealand has maintained a resident ambassador in Brazil since 2001.

=== List of heads of mission ===
==== Ambassadors to Brazil ====
===== Non-resident ambassadors, resident in Chile =====
- David Holborow (1978–1981)
- Ian Landon-Lane (1981–1985)
- Barry Brooks (1985–1988)
- Paul Tipping (1988–1992)
- Frank Wilson (1992–1996)
- David McGee (1996–1998)

===== Non-resident ambassadors, resident in Argentina =====
- Caroline Forsyth (1998–2001)

===== Resident ambassadors =====
- Denise Almao (2001–2006)
- Alison Mann (2006– )

== Chile ==
The embassy is located in Santiago, Chile's capital city. New Zealand has maintained a resident ambassador in Chile since 1973. The Ambassador to Chile is concurrently accredited to Colombia and Peru. An embassy operated in the latter's capital city from 1972 to 1990.

=== List of heads of mission ===
==== Ambassadors to Chile ====
- John G. McArthur (1973–1975)
- Ken Cunningham (1975–1976)

==== Chargés d'Affaires in Chile ====
- David Holborow (1976–1978)

==== Ambassadors to Chile ====
- Michael Patel (1978–1981)
- Ian Landon-Lane (1981–1985)
- Barry Brooks (1985–1988)
- Paul Tipping (1988–1992)
- Frank Wilson (1992–1996)
- David McKee (1996–2000)
- Richard Mann (2000–2005)
- Nigel Fyfe (2005–)
- Rosemary Paterson in April 2012; start and end dates unknown

== China, People's Republic of ==
The embassy is located in Beijing, PR China's capital city. New Zealand has maintained a resident ambassador in PR China since 1973. The Ambassador to PR China is concurrently accredited to Mongolia.

=== List of heads of mission ===
==== Ambassadors to the People's Republic of China ====
- Bryce Harland (1973–1976)
- Dick Atkins (1976–1979)
- Harle Freeman-Greene (1979–1982)
- Tony Small (1982–1985)
- Lindsay Watt (1985–1990)
- Michael Powles (1990–1993)
- Chris Elder (1993–1998)
- Peter Adams (1998–2001)
- John McKinnon (2001–2004)
- Tony Browne (2004–2009)
- Carl Worker (2009–2015)
- John McKinnon (January 2015–present)

== Egypt, Arab Republic of ==
The embassy is located in Cairo, Egypt's capital city. New Zealand has maintained a resident ambassador in Egypt since 2006. The Ambassador to Egypt is concurrently accredited to Algeria, Lebanon, Libya, Tunisia and is Representative to the Palestinian Authority.

=== List of heads of mission ===
==== Resident Ambassadors to the Arab Republic of Egypt ====
- Rene Wilson (2006–2011)
- David Strachan (2011–2014)
- Barney Riley (2014–2018)
- Greg Lewis (2019 –)

== France ==
The embassy is located in Paris, France's capital city. New Zealand has maintained a resident ambassador in France since 1957, and a resident head of mission since 1949. The ambassador to France is concurrently accredited to Algeria and the OECD.

The permanent delegate to UNESCO is also accredited through the embassy in Paris; the Head of Mission to UNESCO is usually the Deputy Head of the mission to France. See: List of permanent delegates from New Zealand to UNESCO.

=== List of heads of mission ===
==== Ministers in France ====
- Jean McKenzie (1949–1956)
- Joseph Vivian Wilson (1956–1957)

==== Ambassadors to France ====
- Joseph Vivian Wilson (1957–1960)
- C.E. Beeby (1960–1964)
- Charles Craw (1964–1965)
- Dick Hutchens (1965–1969)
- Paul Gabites (1969–1975)
- John G. McArthur (1975–1979)
- John Scott (1979–1983)
- John G. McArthur (1983–1988)
- Judith Trotter (1988–1992)
- Chris Beeby (1992–1995)
- Richard Woods (1995–1999)
- Richard Grant (1999–2002)
- Adrian Macey (2002–2006)
- Sarah Dennis (2006–)

== Germany ==
The embassy is located in Berlin, Germany's capital city. New Zealand has maintained a resident ambassador in Germany since 1966. The Ambassador to Germany is concurrently accredited to Austria, the Czech Republic, Hungary, Slovakia, and Switzerland.

=== List of heads of mission ===
==== Ambassadors to Germany ====
- Reuel Lochore (1966–1969)
- Doug Zohrab (1969–1975)
- Hunter Wade (1975–1978)
- Basil Bolt (1978–1982)
- Jack Shepherd (1982–1985)
- Ted Farnon (1985–1990)
- Richard Grant (1990–1994)
- Gerry Thompson (1994–1998)
- Win Cochrane (1998–2003)
- Peter Hamilton (2003– )

== Indonesia ==
The embassy is located in South Jakarta, Indonesia's capital city. New Zealand has maintained a resident ambassador in Indonesia since 1968, and a resident Head of Mission since 1961.

=== List of heads of mission ===
==== Consuls-General to Indonesia ====
- Duncan McFadyen Rae (1961–1963)

==== Chargés d'Affaires in Indonesia ====
- Duncan McFadyen Rae (1963)
- Paul Edmonds (1963–1964)

==== Ministers in Indonesia ====
- Reuel Lochore (1964–1966)

==== Ambassadors to Indonesia ====
- Bill Challis (1968–1971)
- Basil Bolt (1971–1973)
- Ray Jermyn (1973–1976)
- Roger Peren (1976–1980)
- Richard Nottage (1980–1982)
- Michael Powles (1982–1986)
- Gordon Parkinson (1986–1990)
- Neil Walter (1990–1994)
- Tim Groser (1994–1997)
- Michael Green (1997–2001)
- Chris Elder (2001–2006)
- Phillip Gibson (2006–)

== Iran ==
The embassy is located in Tehran, Iran's capital city. New Zealand has maintained a resident ambassador in Iran since 1975. The Ambassador to Iran is concurrently accredited to Afghanistan and Pakistan.

=== List of heads of mission ===
==== Ambassadors to Iran ====
- Bruce Brown (1975–1978)
- Chris Beeby (1978–1980)

==== Chargés d'Affaires in Iran ====
- Graeme Ammundsen (1980–1982)

==== Ambassadors to Iran ====
- Don Harper (1982–1984)
- Richard Woods (1984–1987)
- John Wood (1987–1990)
- Laurie Markes (1990–1993)
- John Hayes (1993–1995)
- Daniel Richards (1995–1998)
- Warwick Hawker (1998–2002)
- Niels Holm (2002–2005)
- Hamish MacMaster (2005–2008)
- Eamonn O'Shaughnessy
- Hamish MacMaster
- Mike Walsh (2021– )

== Italy ==
The embassy is located in Rome, Italy's capital city. New Zealand has maintained a resident ambassador in Italy since 1966. The Ambassador to Italy is concurrently accredited to Bosnia and Herzegovina, Croatia, Cyprus, Greece, Malta, Portugal, and Slovenia.

=== List of heads of mission ===
==== Ambassadors to Italy ====
- Alister McIntosh (1966–1970)
- Ian Stewart (1970–1972)

==== Chargés d'Affaires in Italy ====
- Dick Atkins (1972–1973)

==== Ambassadors to Italy ====
- Phil Holloway (1973–1976)
- Eric Halstead (1976–1980)
- Jim Weir (1980–1983)
- Gordon Parkinson (1983–1986)
- Tony Small (1986–1990)
- Peter Bennett (1990–1994)
- Judith Trotter (1994–1998)
- Peter Bennett (1998–2003)
- Julie MacKenzie (2003– )
- Trevor Matheson
- Anthony Simpson (2019–)

== Japan ==
The embassy is located in Tokyo, Japan's capital city. New Zealand has maintained a resident ambassador in Japan since 1958, and a resident Head of Mission since 1947.

=== List of heads of mission ===
==== Government Trade Representatives in Japan ====
- Bill Challis (1947–1952)

==== Chargés d'Affaires in Japan ====
- Bill Challis (1952–1956)

==== Minister in Japan ====
- John Reid (1956–1958)

==== Ambassadors to Japan ====
- John Reid (1958–1961)
- E B E Taylor (1961–1965)
- John Scott (1965–1969)
- Hunter Wade (1969–1972)
- Tom Larkin (1972–1976)
- Rod Miller (1976–1983)
- Graham Ansell (1983–1984)
- Roger Peren (1984–1987)
- Richard Nottage (1987–1988)
- Rod Gates (1988–1992)
- David McDowell (1992–1994)
- Maarten Wevers (1994–1998)
- Neil Walter (1998–1999)
- Phillip Gibson (1999–2005)
- John A. McArthur (2005–2007)
- Ian Kennedy (2007–2012)
- Mark Sinclair (July 2012– )

== Mexico ==
The embassy is located in Mexico City, Mexico's capital city. New Zealand has maintained a resident ambassador in Mexico since 1983. The Ambassador to Mexico is concurrently accredited to Cuba, El Salvador, Guatemala, and Venezuela.

=== List of heads of mission ===
==== Non-resident ambassadors, resident in the United States ====
- Lloyd White (1974–1978)
- Merwyn Norrish (1978–1980)
- Frank Gill (1980–1982)
- Lance Adams-Schneider (1982–1983)

==== Resident ambassadors ====
- Peter Fairfax (1983–1986)
- Rodney Denham (1986–1990)
- Bruce Middleton (1990–1993)
- Laurie Markes (1993–1997)
- Bronwen Chang (1997–2001)
- Paul Tipping (2001–2004)
- George Troup (2004–)

== Netherlands ==
The embassy is located in The Hague. New Zealand has maintained a resident ambassador in the Netherlands since 1967, and a resident Head of Mission since 1950. The Ambassador to the Netherlands is concurrently accredited to Denmark, Finland, Norway, and Sweden.

=== List of heads of mission ===
==== Consuls to the Netherlands ====
- J V Brennan (1950–1952)
- C F Shapcott (1952–1957)
- T A N Johnson (1957–1961)
- Jim Hale (1961–1965)

==== Ambassadors to the Netherlands ====
===== Non-resident ambassadors, resident in France =====
- Dick Hutchens (1965–1967)

===== Resident ambassadors =====
- Rex Cunninghame (1967–1972)
- Vince Roberts (1972–1977)
- Gray Thorp (1977–1982)
- Basil Bolt (1982–1988)
- Ken Cunningham (1988–1991)
- Graeme Ammundsen (1991–1995)
- Hilary Willberg (1995–1998)
- Chris Butler (1998–2002)
- David Payton (2002–2006)
- Rachel Fry (2006–2010)
- George Troup (2010–2014)
- Janet Lowe (2014–2017)
- Lyndal Walker (2017– 2021)
- Susannah Gordon (2021– Present)

== Peru ==
The embassy was located in Lima, Peru's capital city. The ambassador in Santiago was originally accredited to Peru, with a resident chargé d'affaires appointed to the embassy in Lima. The embassy closed in 1990, with the chancery becoming occupied by the diplomatic mission of India instead. The Ambassador to Peru was also concurrently accredited to Colombia, Ecuador and Venezuela.

=== List of heads of mission ===
==== Ambassadors to Peru ====
===== Resident ambassadors =====
- Charles John Mabyn Ross (1980–1983; retired 1984)
- Peter Bennett (1987–1988)
- Barry H. Brooks (1988–1990)
- Bruce Middleton (1990)

== Philippines ==
The embassy is located in Manila, the Philippines' capital city. New Zealand has maintained a resident ambassador in the Philippines since 1975.

=== List of heads of mission ===
==== Ministers to the Philippines ====
===== Non-resident ministers, resident in Hong Kong =====
- Bill Challis (1966–1968)
- Gray Thorp (1968–1971)

===== Non-resident ambassadors, resident in Hong Kong =====
- Richard Taylor (1971–1975)

===== Resident ambassadors =====
- Mac Chapman (1975–1978)
- Barbara Angus (1978–1981)
- David Holborow (1981–1984)
- Paul Cotton (1984–1988)
- Alison Stokes (1988–1992)
- Harle Freeman-Greene (1992–1995)
- Colin Bell (1995–1998)
- Graeme Waters (1998–2001)
- Terry Baker (2001–2004 )
- Rob Moore-Jones (2004–2006)
- David Pine (2006–2008)
- Andrew Matheson (2008–2012)
- Reuben Levermore (2012–2014)
- David Strachan (2014–present)

== Russia ==
The New Zealand embassy is located in Moscow, Russia's capital city. New Zealand has maintained a resident ambassador in Russia since Russian independence in 1992. The Ambassador to Russia is concurrently accredited to Belarus, Kazakhstan, Kyrgyzstan, Turkmenistan, Ukraine, and Uzbekistan.

=== List of heads of mission ===
==== Ambassadors to Russia ====
- Gerald McGhie (1992–1993)
- Richard Woods (1993–1996)
- John Larkindale (1996–1999)
- Geoff Ward (1999–2003)
- Stuart Prior (2003–2006)
- Christopher Elder (2006–2009)
- Ian Hill (2009–)

(See also List of Ambassadors from New Zealand to the Soviet Union, for a list of chief diplomatic representatives in Moscow before 1992.)

== Saudi Arabia ==
The embassy is located in Riyadh, Saudi Arabia's capital city. New Zealand has maintained a resident ambassador in Saudi Arabia since 1985. The Ambassador to Saudi Arabia is concurrently accredited to Bahrain, Kuwait, Oman, Qatar, and the United Arab Emirates. Accreditation to Egypt ceased in 2006 when New Zealand opened an embassy in Cairo.

=== List of heads of mission ===
==== Ambassadors to Saudi Arabia ====
===== Non-resident ambassadors, resident in Italy =====
- Eric Halstead (1977–1980)
- Jim Weir (1980–1983)
- Gordon Parkinson (1983–1985)

===== Resident ambassadors =====
- Ken Cunningham (1985–1987)
- Win Cochrane (1987–1992)
- Gordon Parkinson (1992–1995)
- Graeme Ammundsen (1995–1996)
- David Payton (1997–2000)
- Laurie Markes (2000–2003)
- Jim Howell (2003–2007)
- Trevor Matheson (May 2007 – 2010)
- Rod Harris (2010–2013)
- Hamish MacMaster (2013–2017)
- James Munro (2017 – 2020)
- Barney Riley (ambassador) (2021 - )

== South Korea ==
The embassy is located in Seoul, South Korea's capital city. New Zealand has maintained a resident ambassador in South Korea since 1976. The Ambassador to South Korea is concurrently accredited to North Korea.

=== List of heads of mission ===
==== Ambassadors to South Korea ====
===== Non-resident ambassadors, resident in Japan =====
- E B E Taylor (1962–1965)
- John Scott (1965–1969)
- Hunter Wade (1969–1972)
- Tom Larkin (1972–1976)

===== Resident ambassadors =====
- Ted Farnon (1976–1980)
- David Holborow (1980–1984)
- Chris Butler (1984–1990)
- Peter Kennedy (1990–1993)
- Gerald McGhie (1993–1999)
- Roy Ferguson (1999–2002)
- David Taylor (2002–2006)
- Jane Coombs (2006–)

== South Vietnam ==
The embassy was located in the Caravelle Hotel in Saigon, South Vietnam's capital city. New Zealand first posted a resident ambassador to South Vietnam in 1968, and a resident Head of Mission in 1964.

Although in operation for only thirteen years, during its short history, the mission was one of the most important to New Zealand; from 1964 until 1972, New Zealand fought alongside South Vietnam in the Vietnam War. When North Vietnam successfully invaded South Vietnam, in 1975, the embassy was closed. Twenty years later, New Zealand opened an embassy to the unified Vietnam in Hanoi, having been represented in the intervening time by non-resident ambassadors in Beijing and Bangkok.

=== List of heads of mission ===
==== Ambassadors to South Vietnam ====
===== Non-resident ambassadors, resident in Thailand =====
- Sir Stephen Weir (1962–1967)

==== Chargés d'Affaires in South Vietnam ====
- Natalie England (1964)
- Arthur Pope (1964–1967)
- Paul Edmonds (1967–1968)

==== Ambassadors to South Vietnam ====
- Paul Edmonds (1968–1972)
- Sir Leonard Thornton (1972–1974)
- Norm Farrell (1974–1975)

(See also Vietnam)

== Soviet Union ==
The embassy was located in Moscow, the Soviet Union's capital city. New Zealand first posted a resident ambassador to the Soviet Union in 1974, and a resident Head of Mission in 1944.

When the Soviet Union collapsed, at the end of 1991, the diplomatic mission and staff to the Soviet Union transformed into one to the Russian Federation.

=== List of heads of mission ===
==== Ministers to the Soviet Union ====
- Charles Boswell (1944–1950)

==== Ambassadors to the Soviet Union ====
- Brian Lendrum (1974–1977)
- Jim Weir (1977–1980)

==== Chargés d'Affaires in the Soviet Union ====
- Gerald McGhie (1980–1981)
- Frank Wilson (1981–1984)

==== Ambassadors to the Soviet Union ====
- Alison Stokes (1984–1988)
- John G. McArthur (1988–1990)
- Gerald McGhie (1990–1991)

== Spain ==
The embassy is located in Madrid, Spain's capital city. New Zealand has maintained a resident ambassador in Spain since 1992. The Ambassador to Spain is concurrently accredited to Morocco.

=== List of heads of mission ===
==== Ambassadors to Spain ====
===== Non-resident ambassadors, resident in France =====
- John G. McArthur (1977–1979)
- John Scott (1979–1984)
- John G. McArthur (1984–1987)

===== Non-resident ambassadors, resident in Italy =====
- Tony Small (1987–1990)
- Peter Bennett (1990–1992)

===== Resident ambassadors =====
- Paul Tipping (1992–1996)
- Wilbur Dovey (1996–2000)
- Christine Bogle (2000–2005)
- Geoff Ward (2005–)

== Thailand ==
The embassy is located in Bangkok, Thailand's capital city. New Zealand has maintained a resident ambassador in Thailand since 1961, and a resident Head of Mission since 1958. The Ambassador to Thailand is concurrently accredited to Cambodia, Laos, and Myanmar.

=== List of heads of mission ===
==== Ambassadors to Thailand ====
===== Non-resident ambassadors, resident in Singapore =====
- Foss Shanahan (1956–1958)

==== Chargés d'Affaires in Thailand ====
- Charles Craw (1958–1961)

==== Ambassadors to Thailand ====
- Sir Stephen Weir (1961–1968)
- Ian Stewart (1968–1970)
- Eric Halstead (1970–1973)
- Paul Edmonds (1973–1975)
- Richard Taylor (1975–1981)
- Ray Jermyn (1981–1985)
- Bruce Brown (1985–1988)
- Harle Freeman-Greene (1988–1992)
- Phillip Gibson (1992–1996)
- Adrian Macey (1996–2000)
- Alan Williams (2000–2003)
- Peter Rider (2003–2006)
- Brook Barrington (2006– )

== Timor, East ==
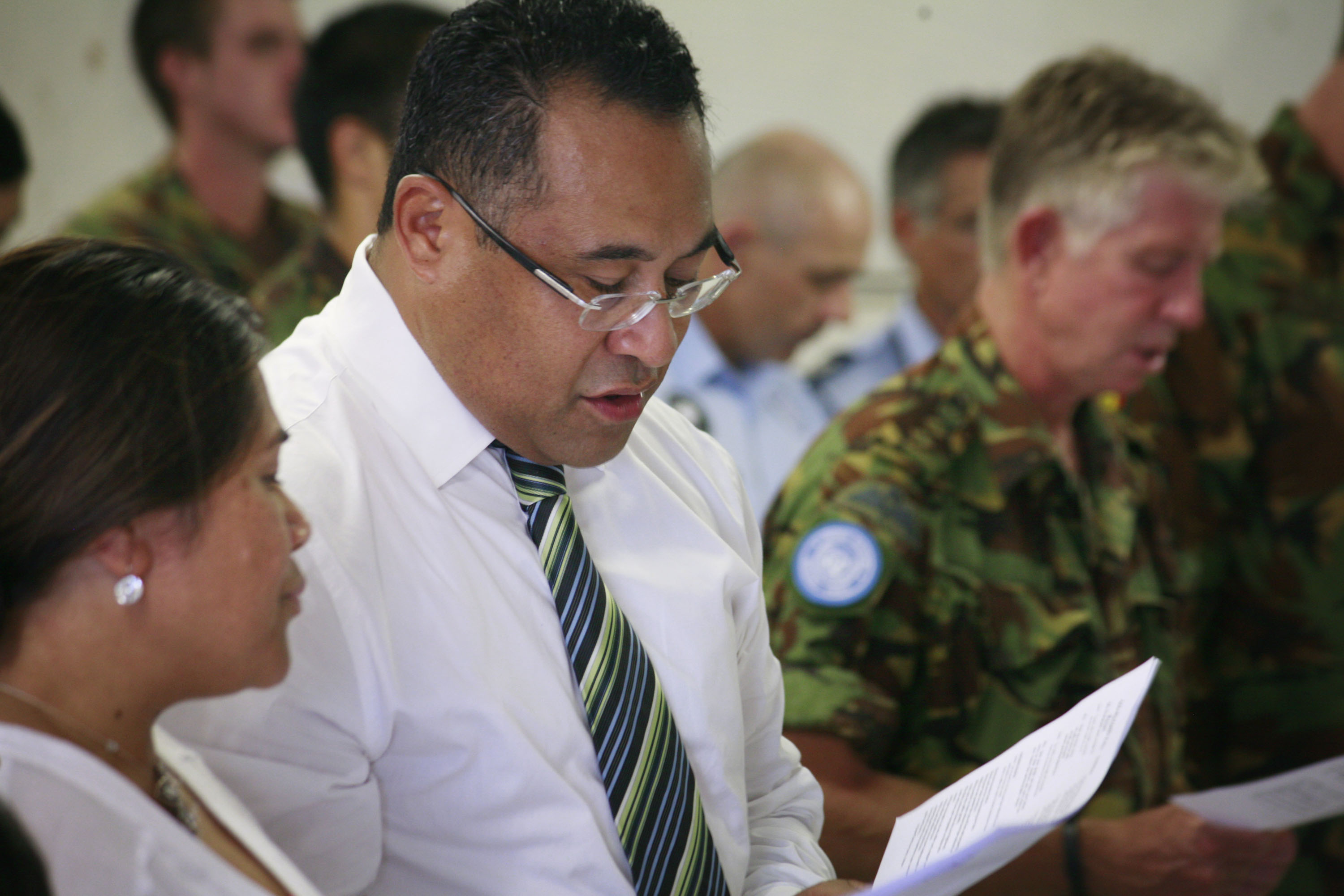
New Zealand Ambassador to Timor-Leste His Excellency Tony Fautua and his wife sing a hymn in comfort to those suffering from the effects of the recent Christchurch earthquake

The embassy is located in Dili, East Timor's capital city. New Zealand has maintained a resident ambassador in East Timor since 2005, and a resident Head of Mission since 2000.

=== List of heads of mission ===
==== Representatives in East Timor ====
- Jonathan Austin (2000–2002)
- James Hill (2008–2011)

==== Consuls-General in East Timor ====
- Jonathan Austin (2002)
- Susannah Gordon (2002–2004)
- Peter Guinness (2004–2005)

==== Ambassadors to East Timor ====
- Ruth Nuttall (2005–2008)
- Tim McIvor (2008–2010)
- Tony Fautua (2011– )
- Jonathon Schwass
- Vicki Poole (2015–2018)
- Philip Hewitt (2018–)

== Turkey ==
The embassy is located in Ankara, Turkey's capital city. New Zealand has maintained a resident ambassador in Turkey since 1993. The Ambassador to Turkey is concurrently accredited to Israel and Jordan.

=== List of heads of mission ===
==== Non-resident ambassadors, resident in Iran ====
- John Wood (1989–1990)
- Laurie Markes (1990–1993)

==== Resident ambassadors ====
- Clive Pearson (1993–1996)
- Ian Kennedy (1996–1999)
- Alan Cook (1999–2003)
- Jan Henderson (2003–2006)
- Hamish Cooper (2006–2009)
- Andrea J. Smith (2009–2012)
- Taha MacPherson (2012–2015)
- Jonathan Curr (2015–2018)
- Wendy Hinton (2018– )

== United States ==
The embassy is located in Washington, D.C., the United States' capital city. New Zealand has maintained a resident ambassador in the United States since 1961, and a resident Head of Mission since 1941.

=== List of heads of mission ===
==== Ministers in the United States ====
- Sir Walter Nash (1941–1944)
- Sir Carl Berendsen (1944–1952)
- Sir Leslie Munro (1952–1958)

==== Chargés d'Affaires in the United States ====
- Lloyd White (1958–1961)

==== Ambassadors to the United States ====
- George Laking (1961–1967)
- Frank Corner (1967–1972)
- Lloyd White (1972–1978)
- Merwyn Norrish (1978–1980)
- Frank Gill (1980–1982)
- Lancelot Adams-Schneider (1982–1985)
- Sir Wallace Rowling (1985–1988)
- Tim Francis (1988–1991)
- Denis McLean (1991–1994)
- John Wood (1994–1998)
- Jim Bolger (1998–2002)
- John Wood (2002–2006)
- Roy Ferguson (2006–2010)
- Mike Moore (2010–2015)
- Carl Worker Chargé d'Affaires a.i., (June 2015 – December 2015)
- Tim Groser (2016–2018)
- Rosemary Banks (2019-2022)
- Bede Corry (2022- )

== Vietnam ==
The embassy is located in Hanoi, Vietnam's capital city. New Zealand has maintained a resident ambassador in Vietnam since 1995.

=== List of heads of mission ===
==== Ambassadors to Vietnam ====
===== Non-resident ambassadors, resident in Beijing =====
- Bryce Harland (1975–1976)
- Dick Atkins (1976–1979)

===== Non-resident ambassadors, resident in Bangkok =====
- Richard Taylor (1979–1981)
- Ray Jermyn (1981–1986)
- Bruce Brown (1986–1988)
- Harle Freeman-Greene (1988–1992)
- Phillip Gibson (1992–1995)

===== Resident ambassadors =====
- David Kersey (1995–1998)
- Yan Flint (1998–2000)
- Malcolm McGoun (2000–2004)
- Michael Chilton (2004–2006)
- James Kember (2006–?)
- Haike Manning (2012–2016)
- Wendy Matthews (2016–2020)
- Tredene Dobson (2020– )

== See also ==
- Foreign relations of New Zealand
- List of diplomatic missions of New Zealand
- List of New Zealand diplomatic posts
- List of ambassadors and high commissioners to New Zealand
