= List of ambassadors of New Zealand to France =

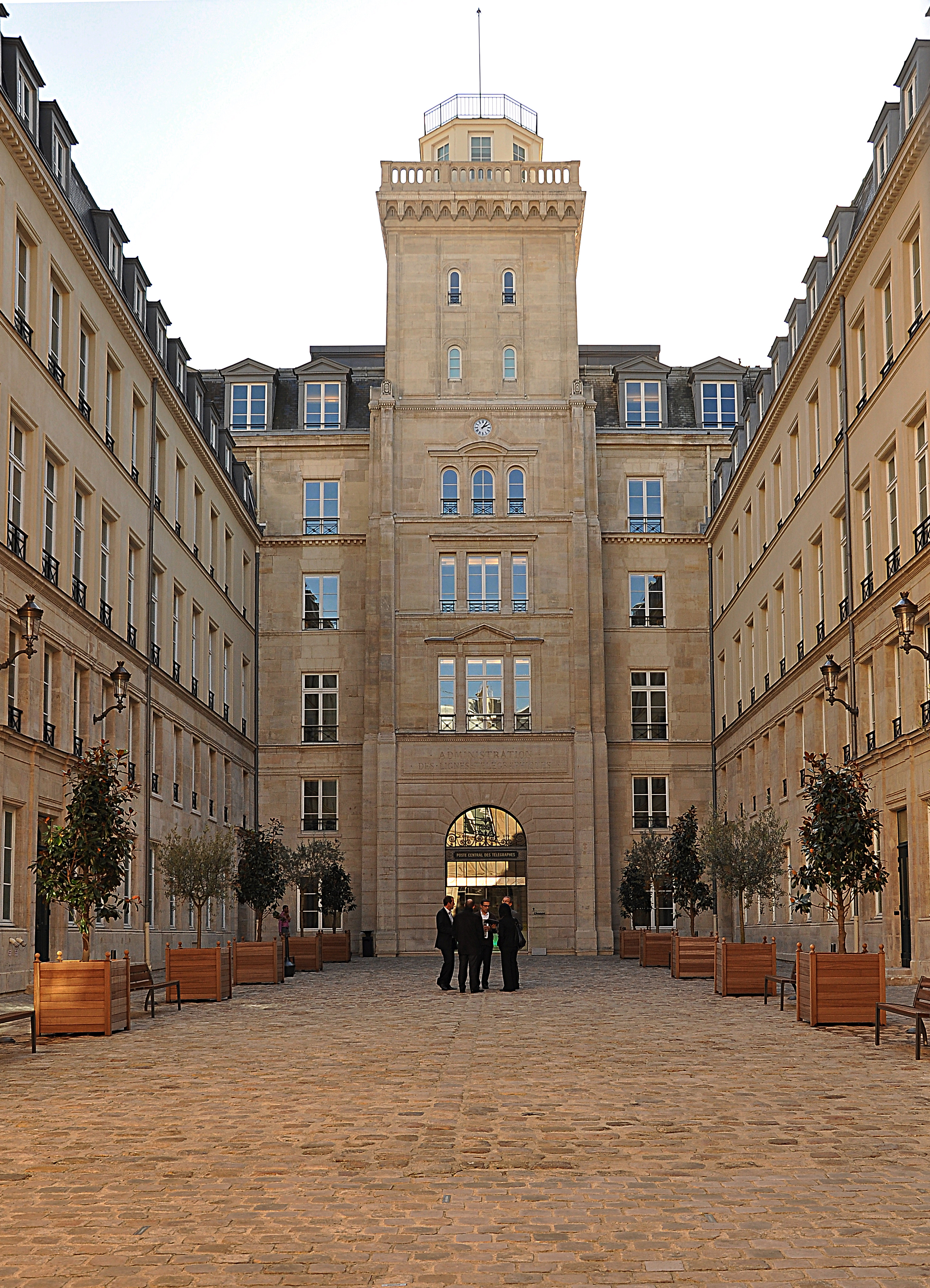
Embassy of New Zealand in Paris

The ambassador from New Zealand to France is New Zealand's foremost diplomatic representative in the Republic of France, and in charge of New Zealand's diplomatic mission in France.

The embassy is located at 103 rue de Grenelle in Paris, France's capital city. New Zealand has maintained a resident ambassador in France since 1957, and a resident Head of Mission since 1949. The ambassador to France is concurrently accredited to Portugal, Senegal and the OECD.

The permanent delegate to UNESCO is also accredited through the embassy in Paris; the head of mission to UNESCO is usually the deputy head of the mission to France. See: List of permanent delegates of New Zealand to UNESCO.

== List of heads of mission ==
=== Ministers in France ===
- Jean McKenzie (1949–1956)
- Joseph Vivian Wilson (1956–1957)

=== Ambassadors to France ===
- Joseph Vivian Wilson (1957–1960)
- C.E. Beeby (1960–1964)
- Charles Craw (1964–1965)
- Dick Hutchens (1965–1969)
- Owston Paul Gabites (1969–1975)
- John G. McArthur (1975–1979)
- John Scott (1979–1983)
- John G. McArthur (1983–1988)
- Judith Trotter (1988–1992)
- Chris Beeby (1992–1995)
- Richard Woods (1995–1999)
- Richard Grant (1999–2002)
- Adrian Macey (2002–2006)
- Sarah Dennis (2006-2010)
- Rosemary Banks (2010-2014)
- James Kember (2014-2017)
- Jane Coombs (2017-2022)
- Caroline Bilkey (2022-2025)
- Joanna Kempkers (2026-)
