= List of ambassadors of New Zealand to Thailand =

The Ambassador from New Zealand to Thailand is New Zealand's foremost diplomatic representative in the Kingdom of Thailand, and in charge of New Zealand's diplomatic mission in Thailand.

The embassy is located in Bangkok, Thailand's capital city. New Zealand has maintained a resident ambassador in Thailand since 1961, and a resident Head of Mission since 1958. The Ambassador to Thailand is concurrently accredited to Cambodia, and Laos.

== List of heads of mission ==
=== Non-resident ambassador to Thailand ===
- Foss Shanahan (1956–1958) (resident in Singapore)

=== Chargé d'Affaires in Thailand ===
- Charles Craw (1958–1961)

=== Ambassadors to Thailand ===
- Sir Stephen Weir (1961–1968)
- Ian Stewart (1968–1970)
- Eric Halstead (1970–1973)
- Paul Edmonds (1973–1975)
- Richard Taylor (1975–1981)
- Ray Jermyn (1981–1985)
- Bruce Brown (1985–1988)
- Harle Freeman-Greene (1988–1992)
- Phillip Gibson (1992–1996)
- Adrian Macey (1996–2000)
- Alan Williams (2000–2003)
- Peter Rider (2003–2006)
- Brook Barrington (2006 - 2009)
- Bede Corry (2009 - 2012)
- Tony Lynch (2012 -2014)
- Reuben Levermore (2014-2015)
- Ben King (2015-2017)
- Peter Rider (Charge d’Affaires 2017-2018)
- Taha Macpherson (2018-2021)
- Mary Thurston (Charge d’Affaires)
- Jonathan Kings (2022-2023)
