= List of high commissioners of New Zealand to Singapore =

The high commissioner of New Zealand to Singapore is New Zealand's foremost diplomatic representative in the Republic of Singapore, and in charge of New Zealand's diplomatic mission in Singapore.

The High Commission is located on the 21st floor of One George Street in Raffles Place. New Zealand has maintained a resident high commissioner in Singapore since Singapore's independence in 1965, and a resident Head of Mission since 1955. The high commissioner to Singapore is concurrently accredited to the Maldives.

As fellow members of the Commonwealth of Nations, diplomatic relations between New Zealand and Singapore are at governmental level, rather than between heads of state. Thus, the countries exchange high commissioners, rather than ambassadors.

Between 1963 and 1965, Singapore was a member state of Malaysia. During that period, the diplomatic mission to Singapore was subsumed by the greater mission to Malaysia; the high commissioner to Malaysia was Hunter Wade. However, New Zealand maintained its Commission in Singapore, under the supervision of a deputy high commissioner, Brian Lendrum.

== List of heads of mission ==
=== Commissioners to Singapore ===
Singapore as a British Colony (until 1963)

- Foss Shanahan (1955 – Jul 1958) Commissioner
- Brian Lendrum (Jul 1958 - Dec 1958) acting Commissioner
- Reuel Lochore (Jan. 1959 - Jul 1959) acting Commissioner
- Dick Hutchens (1959–1962) Commissioner
- Hunter Wade (1962–1963) Commissioner
- Bill Challis (1963) Commissioner

=== Deputy High Commissioner to Singapore ===
Singapore as a member state of Malaysia (1963–1965)

- Brian Lendrum (1963–1965)

=== High commissioners to Singapore ===
Singapore as an independent republic inside the Commonwealth (since 1965);

- Brian Lendrum (1965–1966)
- Jim Weir (1966–1970)
- Tim Francis (1970–1974)
- Roger Peren (1974–1976)
- Gerald Hensley (1976–1980)
- Ken Cunningham (1980–1982)
- Judith Trotter (1982–1985)
- Tim Hannah (1985–1987)
- Don Harper (1987–1990)
- Colin Bell (1990–1995)
- Geoff Ward (1995–1998)
- David Kersey (1998–2001)
- NigeI Moore (2001–2004)
- Richard Grant (2004 – )
- Martin Harvey (2008 - 2010)
- Peter Hamilton (2010 - )
- HE Dr Jonathan Austin (2016 - )
