= List of ambassadors of New Zealand to Saudi Arabia =

The Ambassador from New Zealand to Saudi Arabia is New Zealand's foremost diplomatic representative in the Kingdom of Saudi Arabia, and in charge of New Zealand's diplomatic mission in Saudi Arabia.

The embassy is located in Riyadh, Saudi Arabia's capital city. New Zealand has maintained a resident ambassador in Saudi Arabia since 1985. The Ambassador to Saudi Arabia is concurrently accredited to Bahrain, Kuwait, Oman, and Qatar. Cross-accreditation to Egypt ceased in 2006 when New Zealand opened a resident mission in Cairo, and the cross-accreditation to the United Arab Emirates ended in 2011 with the establishment of the New Zealand Embassy in Abu Dhabi.

The New Zealand Embassy in Riyadh also oversees honorary consulates in Jeddah, Saudi Arabia and Muscat, Oman.

== List of heads of mission ==
=== Ambassadors to Saudi Arabia ===
==== Non-resident ambassadors, resident in Italy ====
- Eric Halstead (1977–1980)
- Jim Weir (1980–1983)
- Gordon Parkinson (1983–1985)

==== Resident ambassadors ====
- Ken Cunningham (1985–1987)
- Win Cochrane (1987–1992)
- Gordon Parkinson (1992–1995)
- Graeme Ammundsen (1995–1996)
- David Payton (1996–1999)
- Laurie Markes (2000–2003)
- Jim Howell (2003–2007)
- Trevor Matheson (29 May 2007– 27 August 2010)
- Rod Harris (28 August 2010 – 13 December 2013)
- Hamish MacMaster (3 January 2014 - )
