= List of permanent delegates of New Zealand to UNESCO =

The permanent delegate of New Zealand to UNESCO is New Zealand's foremost diplomatic representative at the United Nations Educational, Scientific and Cultural Organization, and in charge of New Zealand's diplomatic mission to UNESCO.

The Permanent Delegation is located at New Zealand's embassy in Paris, France's capital city and the headquarters of UNESCO. New Zealand has maintained a resident permanent delegate to UNESCO since 1960.

The permanent delegate to UNESCO is accredited through the embassy in Paris; the Head of Mission to UNESCO is usually the Deputy Head of the mission to France. See: List of ambassadors from New Zealand to France.

== List of heads of mission ==
=== Permanent delegates to UNESCO ===
- C. E. Beeby (1960–80)
- David Caffin (1980–81)
- Neil Walter (1981–85)
- Nancy Mullins (1985–88)
- Peter Heenan (1988–92)
- Nick Hurley (1992–96)
- Rachel Fry (1996–98)
- Russell Marshall (1998–2000)
- Simon Gimson (2000–04)
- Linda Te Puni (2004–08)
- Victoria Hallum (2008–12)
- Susannah Gordon (2012–2016)
- Charles Kingston (2016–2020)
- Nicola Reid (2020–present)
