= List of high commissioners of New Zealand to Barbados =

The high commissioner of New Zealand to Barbados is New Zealand's foremost diplomatic representative in Barbados, and in charge of New Zealand's diplomatic mission in Bridgetown, Barbados.

The high commission is located in a building shared with the British High Commissioner to Barbados at Lower Collymore Rock Rd. in Bridgetown, Barbados' capital city. New Zealand has maintained a resident high commissioner in Bridgetown since March 2014. It is further accredited to: Antigua and Barbuda, the Commonwealth of Dominica, Grenada, Guyana, Saint Lucia, Saint Kitts and Nevis, Saint Vincent and the Grenadines, Trinidad and Tobago, the Caribbean Community (CARICOM) and the Organisation of Eastern Caribbean States.

As fellow members of the Commonwealth of Nations, diplomatic relations between New Zealand and Barbados are at governmental level, rather than between heads of state. Thus, the countries exchange high commissioners, rather than ambassadors.

== List of heads of mission ==
=== High commissioners to Barbados ===
==== Non-resident to Barbados, resident in Ottawa, Canada ====
From 1966 to 2014 located in Ottawa, Canada

- Sir Leon Götz (1966–1968)
- Dean Eyre (1968–1973)
- Jack Shepherd (1973–1976)
- Dean Eyre (1976–1980)
- Ed Latter (1980–1985)
- John Wybrow (1985–1988)
- Bruce Brown (1988–1992)
- Judith Trotter (1992–1994)
- Maurice McTigue (1994–1997)
- Jim Gerard (1997–2000)
- Wade Armstrong (2000–2003)
- Graham Kelly (2003–2006)
- Kate Lackey (2006–2010)
- Andrew Needs (2010 – 2013)
- Simon Tucker (2013 – 2014)

==== Resident in Bridgetown, Barbados ====
- Jan Henderson (March 2014– 31 July 2018)
- Anton Ojala (14 August 2018–)

According to the New Zealand government due to logistics and transportation issues surrounding COVID pandemic, the high commission's office closed in 2020. In 2022 New Zealand Special Envoy to the Caribbean, Jan Henderson as government of New Zealand's representative indicated her country was desirous of maintaining its ties and cooperation with the Caribbean through technology.

== See also ==
- List of ambassadors and high commissioners to and from Barbados
- List of ambassadors and high commissioners to and from New Zealand
- List of diplomatic missions in Barbados
- Caribbean Community (CARICOM)
