= Jonathan Kings =

New Zealand diplomat

His Excellency Jonathan Kings

22nd and 26th Administrator of Tokelau
- In office 2011–2018
- Prime Minister: John Key
- Preceded by: John Allen
- Succeeded by: Linda Te Puni

New Zealand Ambassador to Thailand
- In office April 2022 – 23 November 2023
- Prime Minister: Jacinda Ardern; Chris Hipkins
- Preceded by: Taha Macpherson

New Zealand Ambassador to Cambodia
- In office April 2022 – November 2023
- Prime Minister: Jacinda Ardern; Chris Hipkins

New Zealand Ambassador to Laos
- Incumbent
- Assumed office April 2022
- Prime Minister: Jacinda Ardern; Chris Hipkins

Personal details
- Born: Jonathan Dale Kings Auckland, New Zealand
- Spouse: Mandy
- Children: 1
- Education: Victoria University of Wellington
- Occupation: Diplomat

Jonathan Dale Kings is a New Zealand diplomat who is the current New Zealand ambassador to Thailand, Cambodia and Laos. He was formerly the Administrator of Tokelau from 2011 to 2015, and from 2017 to 2018; and the Deputy Secretary of the Pacific and Development Group from 2015 to 2022 as part of the Ministry of Foreign Affairs and Trade he joined in 2010. He was also responsible for New Zealand's relations with Niue.

Kings graduated from the Victoria University of Wellington. Before joining the Ministry of Foreign Affairs and Trade, Kings had a career in law and held responsibilities in Investment New Zealand; New Zealand Trade and Enterprise; and Industry New Zealand. He also worked in Paris for the Organisation for Economic Co-operation and Development. Before 2000, he was a chief executive at an Australasian energy sector consulting firm.

== Early life and education ==
Jonathan Dale Kings was born in Auckland, New Zealand in either 1961 or 1960. He is related to two other New Zealand diplomats. At 7 years old, his family moved to Wellington when his father began working in a senior post for the Department of Education. He graduated from the Victoria University of Wellington.

== Career ==
Kings held posts in London and Paris whilst he was working for the New Zealand Trade and Enterprise.

From 2011 to 2015, Kings served as the 22nd administrator of Tokelau. In 17 December 2013, Kings announced that Tokelau would receive new ships with a capacity of 60 people that would travel to and from Samoa each day by 2015.

From 2017 to 2018, he served again as the administrator of Tokelau following the removal of David Nicholson as administrator. In April 2017, Kings ordered Tokelau to suspend puplic servants Puka and Suveinakama for corruption. In mid-March 2020, he approved financial aid to twelve Pacific nations in response to the COVID-19 pandemic, and also medical aid to Indonesia and Timor-leste.

=== Ambassador to Thailand, Cambodia and Laos ===
On 26 January 2022, the Minister of Foreign Affairs, Nanaia Mahuta, announced the appointment of Kings as the next ambassador to Thailand. Along with Amanda McDonald, he arrived in Bangkok in late February 2022, where he then spent two months learning Thai. He then travelled to Vientiane in Laos to present his letter of credance to the Lao president, Thongloun Sisoulith, on 23 February 2023.

He assumed the role of ambassador to Thailand in April after Songkran. In October, he received his credentials from the Thai king, Vajiralongkorn. On 26 May 2022, he attended the 78th session of the Commission on "From GDP to well-being and sustainability - Means and Measures" in Bangkok. Kings aims to rebuild New Zealand-Thailand relations after they were disrupted by the COVID-19 pandemic.

On 10 June 2022, Kings and the Cambodian Secretary of State of the Ministry of Foreign Affairs and International Cooperation, Tout Panha held a meeting to further Cambodia-New Zealand relations. Later on, he officially launched the 2023 Selection Round for the Manaaki New Zealand Scholarships on 1 February 2023 in Cambodia, offering up to 35 scholarships to Cambodians seeking to help develop Cambodia. Kings has also worked with the New Zealand embassy to encourage Thai students to seek education in New Zealand. On 18 August, he attended the "Maori & Thai Song Dam" exhibition held at Queen Sirikit National Convention Center in Bangkok, which aimed to strengthen connections between ethnic Maoris and Lao Songs.

== Personal life ==
Kings' favourite hobby is golf. He is married to Madame Mandy, whom they live together in downtown Bangkok. Together they have one daughter and two grandchildren who reside in Wellington. As ambassador, he has visited Ayutthaya, Hua Hin, Krabi, Pattaya and Sukhothai with his wife. The two also enjoy visiting museums and art galleries in Bangkok.

In September 2022, he was admitted to a hospital in Thailand.

Preceded by John Allen	Administrator of Tokelau; 2011–2015	Succeeded by Linda Te Puni
Preceded by Brook Barrington	Administrator of Tokelau; 2017–2018	Succeeded by Ross Ardern
