= Hunter Wade =

New Zealand diplomat

Robert Hunter Wade (14 June 1916 – 7 July 2011) was a New Zealand diplomat.

== Early life ==
Wade was born in Balclutha in 1914. He was educated at Waitaki Boys' High School before attending first University of Otago then Victoria University of Wellington where he graduated with a Master of Arts. In 1939, he began work at the New Zealand Treasury and Marketing Department. In 1941, he married Avelda Grace Petersen with whom he had two sons and two daughters.

== Career ==
From 1941 to 1943, he was the official secretary of the New Zealand delegation at the Eastern Group Supply Council in India then working in the New Zealand government offices. In 1947 he became assistant secretary of the New Zealand High Commission in Canberra. From 1951 to 1956 Wade was the first secretary of the New Zealand embassy in Washington D.C. before becoming director of the Colombo Plan Bureau, Colombo from 1957 to 1959. He was then head of the external aid division at the Department of External Affairs from 1959 to 1962.

Wade was New Zealand's Commissioner to Singapore from 1962 to 1963. From 1963 to 1967 he was High Commissioner of New Zealand to Malaysia. His time in Malaysia coincided with the Indonesia–Malaysia confrontation where New Zealand diplomatically and militarily supported the Malaysian government. He was then posted to London and was New Zealand's deputy High Commissioner. Briefly in 1968 he served as acting High Commissioner to the United Kingdom for a period after Sir Thomas Macdonald retired from the post and before a permanent successor could arrive in London.

He was New Zealand Ambassador to Japan (as well as Ambassador South Korea, resident in Tokyo) from 1969 to 1972. From 1972 to 1974 he was Commonwealth Deputy Secretary-General for Economic Affairs and Development. He was then New Zealand Ambassador to West Germany from 1975 to 1978.

Bonn was his last posing and Wade retired in 1978.

== Personal life ==
His wife died in 1991 and he died at his home in Howick in 2011. He was survived by three of his children and six grandchildren.

== Notes ==
Diplomatic posts
Preceded by Doug Zohrab	New Zealand Ambassador to Germany; 1975–1978	Succeeded by Basil Bolt
Preceded by John Scott	New Zealand Ambassador to Japan; 1969–1972	Succeeded by Tom Larkin
Preceded by Sir Thomas Macdonald	High Commissioner from New Zealand to the United Kingdom; 1968	Succeeded by Denis Blundell
Preceded by Charles Bennett	High Commissioner of New Zealand to Malaysia; 1963–1967	Succeeded by Doug Zohrab
Preceded by Dick Hutchens	Commissioner to Singapore; 1962–1963	Succeeded by Bill Challis
