= List of ambassadors of New Zealand to Vietnam =

The Ambassador from New Zealand to Vietnam is New Zealand's foremost diplomatic representative in the Socialist Republic of Vietnam, and in charge of New Zealand's diplomatic mission in Vietnam.

The embassy is located in Hanoi, Vietnam's capital city. New Zealand has maintained a resident ambassador in Vietnam since 1995.

== List of heads of mission ==
=== Ambassadors to Vietnam ===
==== Non-resident ambassadors, resident in Beijing ====
- Bryce Harland (1975–1976)
- Dick Atkins (1976–1979)

==== Non-resident ambassadors, resident in Bangkok ====
- Richard Taylor (1979–1981)
- Ray Jermyn (1981–1986)
- Bruce Brown (1986–1988)
- Harle Freeman-Greene (1988–1992)
- Phillip Gibson (1992–1995)

==== Resident ambassadors ====
- David Kersey (1995–1998)
- Yan Flint (1998–2000)
- Malcolm McGoun (2000–2004)
- Michael Chilton (2004–2006)
- James Kember (2006 - )
- Haike Manning (2012 - 2016)
- Wendy Matthews (2016-)

== See also ==
- List of Ambassadors from New Zealand to South Vietnam, for a list of chief diplomatic representatives in Vietnam before 1975.
