= Chris Seed =

New Zealand diplomat and public servant (born 1960/61)

His Excellency Chris Seed CNZM
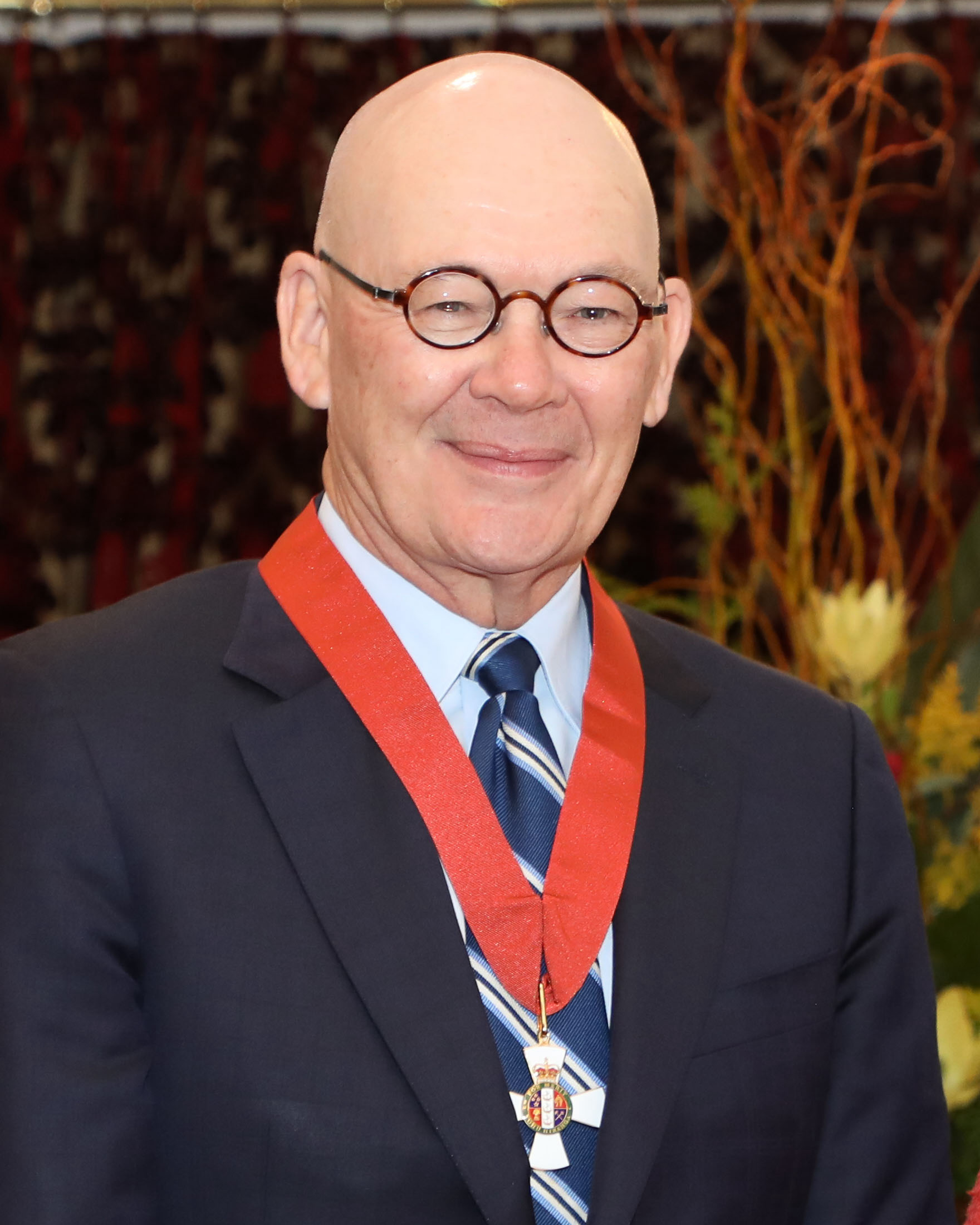
- Seed in 2024

20th New Zealand Ambassador to the United States
- Incumbent
- Assumed office 18 February 2026
- Prime Minister: Christopher Luxon
- Preceded by: Rosemary Banks

Acting High Commissioner of New Zealand to the United Kingdom
- In office 11 March 2025 – 5 September 2025
- Monarch: Charles III
- Prime Minister: Christopher Luxon
- Preceded by: Phil Goff
- Succeeded by: Hamish Cooper

11th Secretary of Foreign Affairs and Trade
- In office 1 February 2019 – 1 February 2024
- Minister: Foreign Affairs; Winston Peters; Nanaia Mahuta; Grant Robertson; Trade; David Parker; Damien O'Connor; Todd McClay
- Preceded by: Brook Barrington
- Succeeded by: Bede Corry (Note: Brook Barrington acted as acting secretary from 1 February to 30 June 2024.)

18th New Zealand High Commissioner to Australia
- In office 21 November 2013 – 7 December 2018
- Monarch: Elizabeth II
- Prime Minister: John Key; Bill English; Jacinda Ardern
- Preceded by: Martyn Dunne
- Succeeded by: Annette King

Personal details
- Born: Christopher John Seed; 1960–1961 (age 64–66) Waipukurau, New Zealand
- Education: Massey University (BA, MA)
- Occupation: Diplomat; public servant

Christopher John Seed CNZM (born 1960–1961) is a New Zealand diplomat and public servant who is currently serving as the 20th New Zealand ambassador to the United States since February 2026. Previously, he served as acting high commissioner of New Zealand to the United Kingdom in 2025, the 11th secretary of Foreign Affairs and Trade from 2019 to 2024, and the 18th high commissioner of New Zealand to Australia from 2013 to 2018.

== Early life and education ==
Christopher John Seed was born in between 1960–1961 in Waipukurau, Hawke's Bay. He attended Central Hawke's Bay College from 1974 to 1978. From Massey University, he was awarded a Bachelor of Arts with Honours (1983) and a Master of Arts in history (1984).

== Career ==
Seed joined the Ministry of Foreign Affairs and Trade in 1985 and had early career postings to Tehran, Canberra, London, and Papua New Guinea.

Seed was deputy secretary in charge of policy and planning at the Ministry of Defence from 2004 to 2008 and also had a one-year secondment to the Australian Department of Foreign Affairs and Trade.

He returned to the Ministry of Foreign Affairs and Trade as a deputy secretary in 2008. During a five-year period he held responsibility for Australia, the Pacific, the Middle East, Africa and Europe. In 2013 he was appointed to be New Zealand's High Commissioner to Australia. He concluded that appointment in 2018 and the next year was appointed Secretary of Foreign Affairs and Trade. His tenure included managing international aspects of New Zealand's response to the COVID-19 pandemic and extracting 1700 New Zealanders from Afghanistan following the international withdrawal from that country in 2021.

Seed retired in 2024, however he was recalled in March 2025 to serve as Acting High Commissioner to the United Kingdom following Phil Goff being removed from the role for making comments about United States President Donald Trump at a Chatham House event in London. Seed will serve as Acting High Commissioner until September 2025, when he will be succeeded by Hamish Cooper. Seed has been appointed to succeed Rosemary Banks as New Zealand's Ambassador to the United States in early 2026.

== Honours and awards ==
In the 2024 King’s Birthday Honours Seed was made a Companion of the New Zealand Order of Merit, for services to the State.
