= Chile–New Zealand relations =

Bilateral relations between Chile and New Zealand

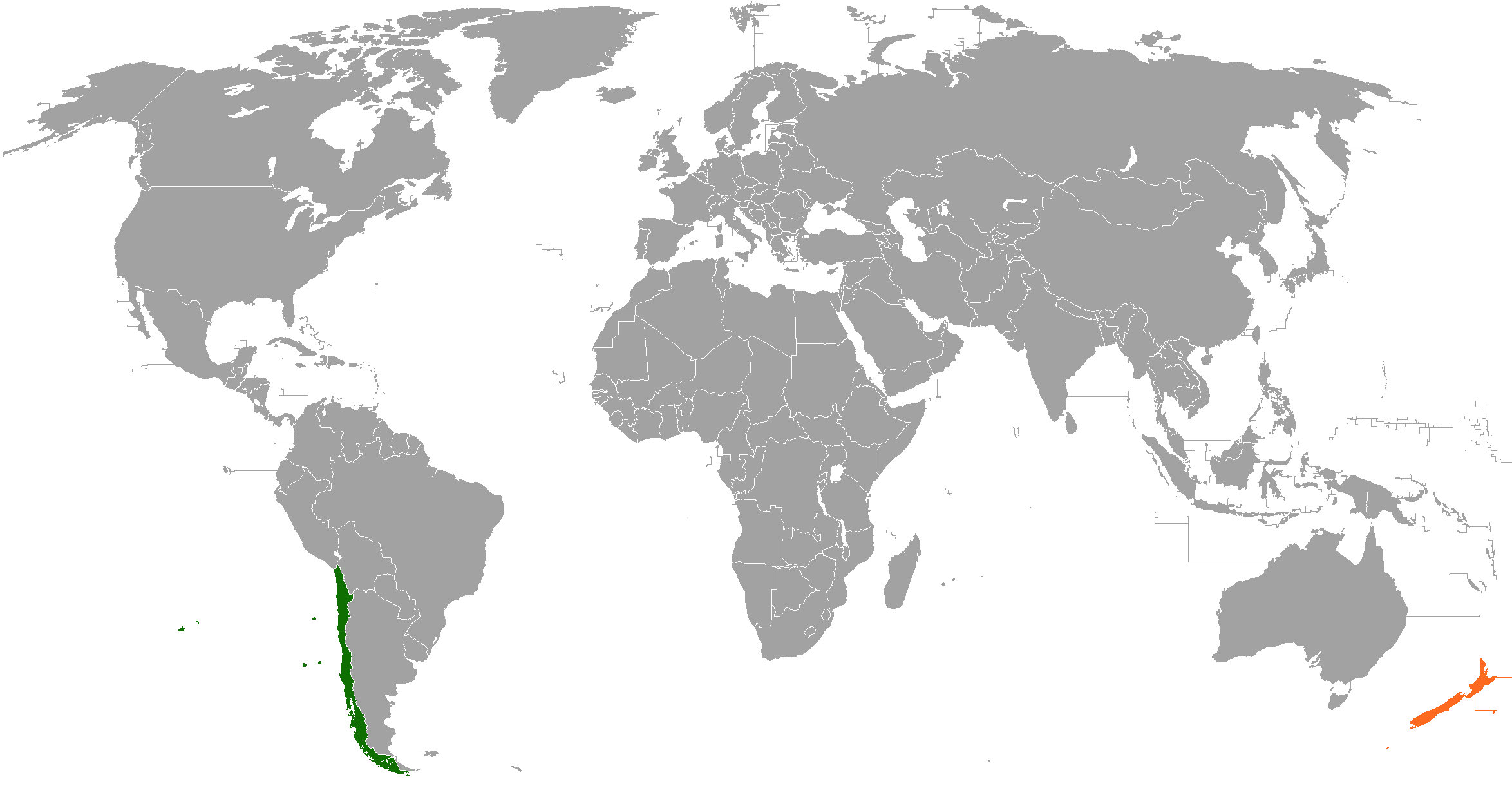

- Chile: New Zealand

Diplomatic mission
- Embassy of Chile in New Zealand: New Zealand Embassy to Chile

Envoy
- Ambassador Ignacio Llanos: Ambassador Linda Te Puni

Chile–New Zealand relations are the diplomatic relations between the Republic of Chile and New Zealand. Both nations are mutual members of the Asia-Pacific Economic Cooperation, Cairns Group, OECD and the United Nations.

== History ==
An early wave of Chilean migration to New Zealand occurred when about 350 Chilean miners who had been active in the Australian gold rushes went to the ongoing gold rush in the South Island in the 1860s. Some had before Australia also participated in the California gold rush.

Chile and New Zealand are two Pacific Rim nations separated by over 9,100 kilometers (5,600 miles). Both nations established diplomatic relations in 1948 and embassies were opened in Wellington and Santiago respectively, in 1972. In 1973, Chilean General Augusto Pinochet took power in Chile after a coup d'état against the government of former Chilean President Salvador Allende. During the Chilean military dictatorship, New Zealand did not break diplomatic relations with Chile. As a result, several protests took place in the 1970s and 1980s in New Zealand against the New Zealand government maintaining diplomatic and trade relations with the military regime of Chile. Throughout the 1970s, several thousand Chilean refugees fled their country, mostly to other Latin American countries and to Europe. During that time period, over 200 Chileans sought asylum in New Zealand.

Since the end of the military dictatorship in Chile, relations between the two countries have greatly improved. Both nations have working holiday visas and have seen several official visits made by Presidents of Chile and Prime Ministers of New Zealand and lower-ranking government officials. In 1993, Chilean President Patricio Aylwin paid an official visit to New Zealand, becoming the first Latin American head of state to visit the country. Both nations work together to combat climate change and improve global agriculture and lobby the international community to help preserve Antarctica. In 2012, New Zealand was granted Observer status for the Pacific Alliance, a regional group that includes Chile, Colombia, Mexico and Peru.

In 2016, Chilean Foreign Minister Heraldo Muñoz visited Auckland to sign the Trans-Pacific Partnership. In 2017, New Zealand Trade Minister Todd McClay visited Chile to attend the High Level Dialogue on Trade in Viña del Mar.

Chilean state-run infrastructure fund Desarrollo País and H2 Cable, a subsidiary of Singapore's BW Digital, announced in 2022 that they were seeking a partner to begin work on the Humboldt Cable, which would help connect Chile to Australasia. The two companies issued a request for proposals (RFP) for a strategic partner to supply and install the submarine cable system. The planned system would span roughly 15,000 kilometers, and connects Valparaiso, Chile, to Sydney, Australia, with provision for branches to additional locations including the Juan Fernández Islands, Easter Island, New Zealand, and Antarctica. Cost estimates ranged between $450 million and $650 million.

== High-level visits ==
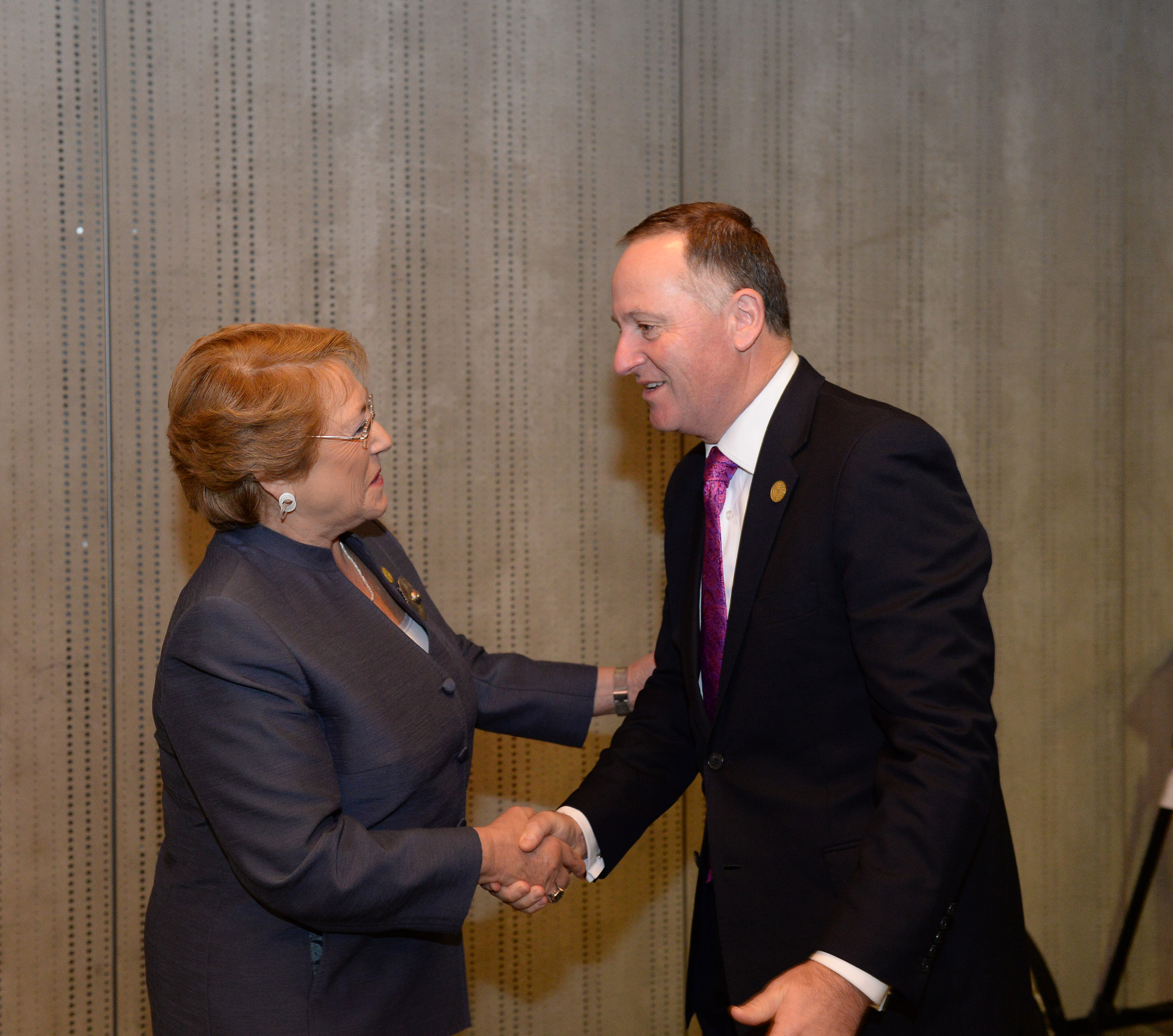
Chilean President Michelle Bachelet meeting with New Zealand Prime Minister John Key at the APEC summit in Peru, 2016.

High-level visits from Chile to New Zealand

- President Patricio Aylwin (1993)
- President Eduardo Frei Ruiz-Tagle (1999)
- President Ricardo Lagos (2000, 2004)
- President Michelle Bachelet (2006)
- Minister of the Economy Pablo Longuiera (2013)
- Foreign Minister Heraldo Muñoz (2016)
- President Sebastián Piñera (2018)

High-level visits from New Zealand to Chile

- Prime Minister Jenny Shipley (1999)
- Prime Minister Helen Clark (2000, 2004, 2006)
- Prime Minister John Key (2013)
- Trade Minister Todd McClay (2016, 2017)

== Transport ==
Chile's largest airline, LATAM Chile, operates flights between Santiago and Auckland.

== Trade ==
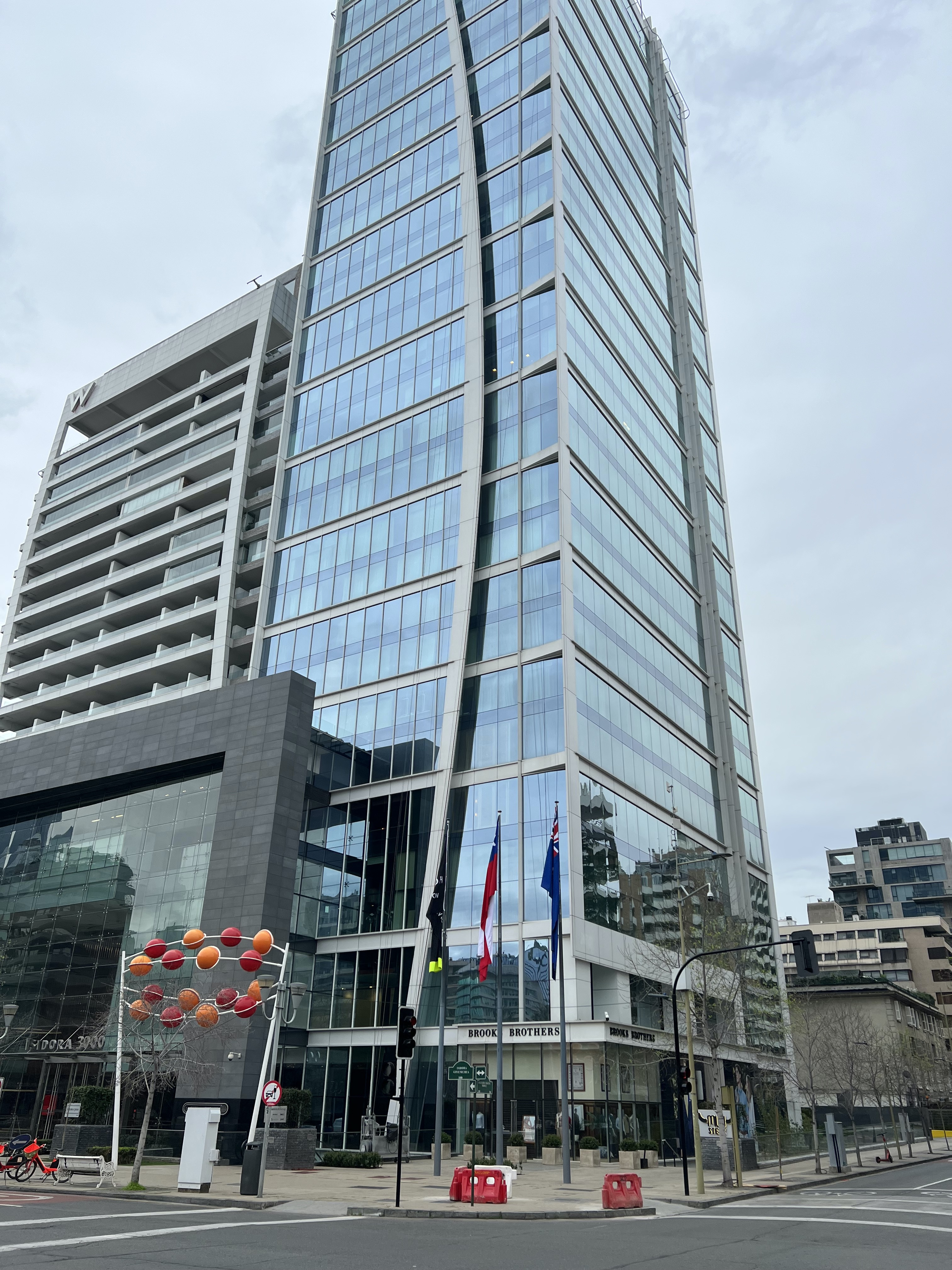
Building hosting the Embassy of New Zealand in Santiago

In 2004, Chile and New Zealand signed a free trade agreement (along with Brunei and Singapore) known as the Trans-Pacific Partnership (P4). In 2016, trade between Chile and New Zealand amounted to US$229 million. Chile's main exports to New Zealand include: wood pulp, wood, fruit, and nuts. New Zealand's main exports to Chile include: dairy products, machinery, and oil seeds. New Zealand's largest company, Fonterra, owns a 99% share in Chile's largest dairy company, Soprole.

== Resident diplomatic missions ==
- Chile has an embassy in Wellington.
- New Zealand has an embassy in Santiago.

== See also ==
- List of ambassadors of New Zealand to Chile
- Refugees in New Zealand
