= List of ambassadors and high commissioners to New Zealand =

This is a list of ambassadors and high commissioners to New Zealand as of 2020.

Sending country	Heads of Mission from sending country to New Zealand	
Afghanistan	H. E. Wahidullah Waissi	
Albania		
Algeria	Nor Eddine Benfreha	
American Samoa		
Argentina	Maria Belen Bolgado	
Australia	Daniel Sloper	List of high commissioners of Australia to New Zealand
Austria	Wolfgang-Lukas Strohmayer	
Bahrain	Mohamed Ghassan Mohamed Shaiko	
Bangladesh	M Allama Siddiki	
Barbados	Glyne Samuel Hyvestra Murray	List
Belarus	Vacant	
Belgium	Michel Goffin	
Bolivia	Vacant	
Bosnia and Herzegovina	Kemal Muftic	
Botswana	Dorcas Makgato	
Brazil	Marcos de Souza Campos	
Brunei	Garry Ramlee Ibrahim	
Cambodia	Chanborey Cheunboran	
Canada	Joanne Lemay	
Chile	Ignacio Llanos Mardones	
China	Wang Xiaolong	
Colombia	Alberto Jose Meija Ferrero	
Cook Islands	Kairangi Samuela	
Croatia	Betty Pavelich Sirois	
Cuba	Luis Morejón Rodríguez	
Cyprus	Antonis Sammoutis	
Czech Republic	Jana Tyrer	
Denmark	Pernille Dahler Kardel	
Ecuador	Victor Cabrera Hidalgo	
Egypt	George Azer Saleeb Tardos	
El Salvador	Werner Romero Guerra	
Eritrea	Vacant	
Estonia	Kersti Eesmaa	
Eswatini	Vacant	
Ethiopia	Vacant	
European Union	Lawrence Meredith	
Fiji	Filimone Waqabaca	
Finland	Satu Mattila-Budich	
France	Laurence Beau	
Georgia	Beka Dvali	
Germany	Stefan Krawielicki	
Ghana	Samuel Kumah	
Greece	George Papakostas	
Guatemala	Ronald Estuardo Recinos Gomez	
Guyana		
Holy See	Novatus Rugambwa	
Hungary	Zsolt Gabor Hetesy	
Iceland	Kristin Árnadóttir	
India	Neeta Bhushan	
Indonesia	Fientje Maritje Suebu	
Iran	Reza Nazar Ahari	
Ireland	Jane Connolly	
Israel	Ran Yaakoby	
Italy	Francesco Calogero	
Jamaica	Shorna-Kay Richards	
Japan	Koichi Ito	
Jordan	Ali Kraishan	
Kazakhstan	Askar Kuttykadam	
Kenya	John Tipis	
Kiribati	Vacant	
North Korea	Vacant	
South Korea	Changsik Kim	
Kuwait	Ahmad Salem Alwehaib	
Kyrgyzstan	Mirlan Arstanbaev	
Laos	Sinchai Manivanh	
Latvia	Margers Krams	
Lebanon	Milad Raad	
Lesotho	Lineo Bernard Poopa	
Lithuania	Darius Degutis	
Luxembourg		
Malaysia	Mazita binti Marzuki	
Maldives	Vacant	
Mali	Guissé Maïmouna Dial	
Malta	Mario Farrugia Borg	
Marshall Islands		
Mauritius	Marie Claire Monty	
Mexico	Alfredo Pérez Bravo	List
Federated States of Micronesia		
Mongolia	Davaasuren Damdinsuren	
Morocco	Wassane Zailachi	
Mozambique	José Maria de Morais	
Myanmar	U Thet Win	
Namibia		
Nauru		
Nepal	Kailash Raj Pokharel	
Netherlands	Ard M.M van der Vorst	
Nigeria	Anderson N. Madubike	
Niue	Vacant	
Norway	Anne Grete Riise	
Oman	Mohamed Said Al Busaidi	
Palau		
Panama	Vacant	
Pakistan	Murad Ashraf Janjua	
Papua New Guinea	Sakias Tameo	
Peru	Jose Emilio Bustinza Soto	
Philippines	Kira Christianne Azucena	
Poland	Grzegorz Kowal	
Portugal	Pedro Rodrigues da Silva	
Qatar	Saad Abdulla Al Mahmoud Al Shareef	
Romania	Radu Gabriel Safta	
Russia	Georgii Zuev	
Samoa	Afamasaga Faamatalaupu Toleafoa	
Saudi Arabia	Muhanna Aba Alkhail	
Serbia	Rade Stefanovic	
Singapore	William Tan Wei Yuan	
Slovakia	Vacant	
Slovenia	Marko Ham	
Solomon Islands	Eliam Tangirongo	
South Africa	Vuyiswa Tulelo	
Spain	Miguel Bauza More	
Sri Lanka	Kusumpala Balapatabendi	
Sweden	Johan Pontus Melander	
Switzerland	Viktor Vavricka	
Tanzania	Baraka Haran Luvanda	
Thailand	Waravuth Pouapinya	
Timor-Leste	Felicidade de Sousa Guterres	
Tonga	Lenisiloti Sitafooti Aho	
Trinidad and Tobago		
Turkey	Omur Unsay	
Turkmenistan		
Tuvalu	Feue Tipu	
Uganda	Dorothy Hyuha	
Ukraine	Vasyl Myroshnychenko	
United Arab Emirates	Rashed Matar Sultan Alsiri Alqemzi	
United Kingdom	Iona Thomas	List
United States	Thomas Udall	List
Uruguay	Dianela Pi Cedres	
Uzbekistan		
Vanuatu	Jimmy Nipo	
Venezuela	Vacant	
Vietnam	Nguyen Van Trung	
Zambia	Elias Munshya	
Zimbabwe	Joe Tapera Mhishi	

== International organisations ==
Organisation	Representative
European Union	Carl Reaich
OECD	Caroline Bilkey
UNESCO	Linda Te Puni
United Nations	Carolyn Schwalger (New York); Lucy Duncan (Geneva); Brian Hewson (Vienna)
World Trade Organization; World Intellectual Property Organization; United Nations Conference on Trade and Development	Clare Kelly
Food and Agriculture Organization	Anthony George Simpson

== See also ==
- List of New Zealand diplomatic posts
- List of ambassadors and high commissioners from New Zealand
- Foreign relations of New Zealand
