= List of ambassadors of New Zealand to Iran =

The Ambassador from New Zealand to Iran is New Zealand's foremost diplomatic representative in the Islamic Republic of Iran, and in charge of New Zealand's diplomatic mission in Iran.

The embassy is located in Tehran, Iran's capital city. New Zealand has maintained a resident ambassador in Iran since 1975. The Ambassador to Iran is concurrently accredited as High Commissioner to Pakistan, and was previously also accredited to Afghanistan prior to New Zealand's establishment of an embassy in Kabul.

== List of heads of mission ==
=== Ambassadors to Iran ===
- Bruce Brown (1975–1978)
- Chris Beeby (1978–1980)

=== Chargé d'Affaires in Iran ===
- Graeme Ammundsen (1980–1982)

=== Ambassadors to Iran ===
- Don Harper (1982–1984)
- Richard Woods (1984–1987)
- John Wood (1987–1990)
- Laurie Markes (1990–1993)
- John Hayes (1993–1995)
- Daniel Richards (1995–1998)
- Warwick Hawker (1998–2002)
- Niels Holm (2002–2005)
- Hamish MacMaster (2005–2009)
- Brian Sanders (2009–March 31, 2014)
- Eamon O'Shaughnessy (March 31, 2014–2021)
- Mike Walsh (2021–present)
