= Bede Corry =

New Zealand diplomat and public servant (born 1964)

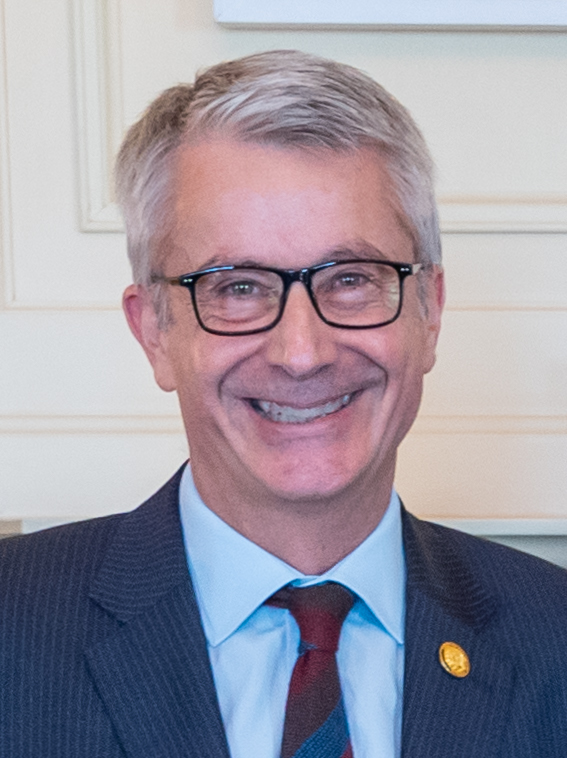
- Corry in 2022

12th Secretary of Foreign Affairs and Trade
- Incumbent
- Assumed office 30 June 2024
- Minister: Foreign Affairs; Winston Peters; Trade; Todd McClay
- Preceded by: Chris Seed (Note: Brook Barrington served as acting secretary from 1 February to 30 June 2024.)

19th New Zealand Ambassador to the United States
- In office September 2022 – 17 June 2024
- Prime Minister: Jacinda Ardern
- Preceded by: Rosemary Banks
- Succeeded by: Rosemary Banks

32nd High Commissioner of New Zealand to the United Kingdom
- In office April 2020 – 8 September 2022
- Monarch: Elizabeth II
- Prime Minister: Jacinda Ardern
- Preceded by: Sir Jerry Mateparae
- Succeeded by: Phil Goff (Note: Shannon Austin acted as high commissioner from 8 September 2022 to January 2023.)

14th New Zealand Ambassador to Thailand
- In office August 2009 – May 2012
- Prime Minister: John Key
- Preceded by: Brook Barrington
- Succeeded by: Tony Lynch

Personal details
- Born: 11 February 1964 (age 62)
- Education: Victoria University of Wellington
- Occupation: Diplomat; public servant

Bede Gilbert Corry (born 11 February 1964) is a New Zealand diplomat and public servant who has served as the 12th secretary of Foreign Affairs and Trade since 2024. Previously, he served as the 19th New Zealand ambassador to the United States from 2022 to 2024, the 32nd high commissioner of New Zealand to the United Kingdom from 2020 to 2022, and the 14th New Zealand ambassador to Thailand from 2009 to 2012.

== Early life ==
Corry grew up in the Taupō–Rotorua area. He is the eighth of ten children to Marie (née Gordon) and John Corry, who was a lawyer and Hong Kong magistrate. Corry studied at Victoria University of Wellington, graduating in 1986 with a Bachelor of Arts with first-class honours.

== Career ==
Corry began his public service and diplomatic career at the Ministry of Foreign Affairs in 1989, working in the Europe division. He was posted to the New Zealand High Commission in Canberra from 1992 to 1995. He was private secretary to foreign ministers Don McKinnon and Phil Goff from 1997 to 2000. While working for McKinnon, Corry was a leading figure in the Bougainville peace process and personally escorted representatives from the Bougainville Transitional Government to Christchurch for peace talks in 1997.

Corry was posted to New Zealand's United States embassy in Washington, D.C. as a counsellor from 2000 to 2004. Returning to New Zealand, he was appointed director of the chief executive's office and director of the Ministry's Australian division. In 2009, he succeeded Brook Barrington in the post of Ambassador to Thailand which he held until 2012.

Corry succeeded Barrington a second time in the position of deputy secretary for policy and planning at the Ministry of Defence from 2012 to 2014. He then returned to the Ministry of Foreign Affairs and Trade as deputy secretary for Australia, Pacific, Europe, Middle East and Africa until 2015, and deputy chief executive for policy until 2020.

Corry was posted to the London as high commissioner to the United Kingdom from 2020 to 2022 and thereafter returned to Washington as New Zealand ambassador to the United States.

He was appointed Chief Executive and Secretary for Foreign Affairs and Trade in March 2024 and took up that position on 30 June, succeeding acting chief executive Brook Barrington. This was Corry's third application for the position, having been unsuccessful in 2015 (to Barrington's first appointment) and in 2018 (to Chris Seed).
