= Gordon Parkinson =

New Zealand diplomat

Gordon Noel Parkinson

Ambassador of New Zealand to Peru
- In office January 1, 1978 – January 1, 1980
- Preceded by: Ian Landon Lane Chargé d'affaires
- Succeeded by: Barry Hewitt Brooks

Ambassador of New Zealand to Italy
- In office January 1, 1983 – May 2, 1986
- Preceded by: Jim Weir
- Succeeded by: Francis Anthony Small

Ambassador of New Zealand to Indonesia
- In office May 2, 1986 – 1990
- Preceded by: Michael Powles
- Succeeded by: Neil Walter

Personal details
- Born: 5 February 1935 (age 91) Woodville, New Zealand
- Spouse(s): Margaret Geard, daughter of Maud Crist and Herbert Charles Wilkes Geard, m. 1957
- Children: Two sons and one daughter
- Parents: Henry James Parkinson (father); Doris Myrtle (nee Christiansen) (mother)
- Education: Normal School (Christchurch), Mt Cook, Lyall Bay Primary Schools, Wellington, Rongotai Coll, Wellington
- Alma mater: 1956 Bachelor of Laws Victoria University of Wellington

Gordon Noel Parkinson (born 1935) is a retired diplomat of New Zealand. He served as consul-general in Bangkok from 1968 to 1970. He was New Zealand's Ambassador to Peru from 1978 to 1980, Ambassador to Italy from 1983 to 1986 and Ambassador to Indonesia from 1986 to 1990.

== Early life and education ==
Parkinson attended Rongatai College, Wellington and obtained a bachelor of laws degree from Victoria University of Wellington in 1956.

== Career ==
Parkinson joined the Ministry of Foreign Affairs and Trade (MFAT) in Wellington in 1956. He served in various posts in New Zealand and overseas from 1956 to 1968. In 1968, he became consul-general in Bangkok and New Zealand's charge d'affaires and acting SEATO Council representative. From 1971 to 1974, he served as an executive at the Ministry.

From 1974 to 1978, he served as Minister (envoy) of the embassy in Paris. While in Paris in 1977, he attended the ceremony in Le Quesnoy to honour Leslie Averill, the first man to scale the walls of the walled city during the liberation of the town in World War I.

From 1978 to 1980, Parkinson was Ambassador to Peru, and non-resident Ambassador to Colombia and Ecuador. He returned to New Zealand in 1980. In 1982, he became a visiting fellow of the Victoria University of Wellington.

In 1983, Parkinson was again posted overseas, serving as ambassador to Italy with accreditation in Saudi Arabia, Egypt, and Yugoslavia. He served in the role until 1986 when he was made ambassador in Jakarta (Indonesia).

In 1990, he returned to New Zealand as director of MFAT's Americas Division.

== Personal life ==
In 1957, Parkinson married Margaret Geard in Wellington.

== Works ==
- Parkinson, Gordon. “New Zealand Foreign Policy: Grounds for Optimism.” New Zealand International Review 7, no. 4 (1982): 13–17.
