= List of high commissioners of New Zealand to the Solomon Islands =

The high commissioner of New Zealand to the Solomon Islands is New Zealand's foremost diplomatic representative in the Solomon Islands, and in charge of New Zealand's diplomatic mission in the Solomon Islands.

The high commission is located in Honiara, the Solomon Islands' capital city. New Zealand has maintained a resident high commissioner in the Solomon Islands since 1978.

As fellow members of the Commonwealth of Nations, diplomatic relations between New Zealand and the Solomon Islands are at governmental level, rather than between heads of state. Thus, the countries exchange high commissioners, rather than ambassadors.

== List of heads of mission ==
=== Commissioners to the Solomon Islands ===
==== Non-resident Commissioners, resident in Papua New Guinea ====
- Michael Mansfield (1977–1978)

=== High commissioners to the Solomon Islands ===
- John Graeme Ammundsen (1978–1980)
- Mary Chamberlin (1980–1983)
- Rodney Denham (1983–1986)
- Alison Pearce (1986–1988)
- Bernard Hillier (1988–1992)
- Tia Barrett (1992–1996)
- Rhys Richards (1996–1999)
- Nick Hurley (1999–2002)
- Heather Riddell (2002–2004)
- Brian Sanders (2004–2006)
- Deborah Panckhurst (2006—2009)
- Mark Ramsden (2009—2013)
- Marion Cranshaw (2014—2016)
- Don Higgins (2016—2019)
- Georgina Roberts (2020—2021)
- Jonathan Schwass (2022—2025)
- Jonathan Curr (2025—present)

== See also ==
- List of high commissioners of New Zealand to Samoa
- List of high commissioners of New Zealand to South Africa
