= Kate Lackey =

New Zealand diplomat

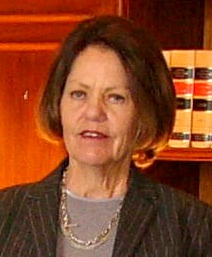
Kate Lackey 2008 (cropped)

Kate Lackey is a diplomat from New Zealand who was their high Commissioner to Australia (2002-2005) and in 1997, was appointed their first female Deputy Secretary of Foreign Affairs and Trade.

Lackey was also High Commissioner to Canada and Barbados from 2006 until 2010.
