= Frank Wilson (diplomat) =

New Zealand diplomat

Chargé d'Affaires of New Zealand to the Soviet Union
- In office September 1981 – May 1984
- Preceded by: Gerald Reginald McGhie
- Succeeded by: Alison Vale Stokes

Ambassador of New Zealand to Chile
- In office 27 March 1992 – 1996
- Preceded by: Paul Tipping
- Succeeded by: David McKee

Personal details
- Born: 1946 (age 79–80)
- Relatives: Ormond Wilson (father); Frank Rolleston (grandfather); John Davies Ormond (great-grandfather); William Rolleston (great-grandfather); Mary Rolleston (great-grandmother); James Wilson (great-grandfather); John Rolleston (great uncle); George Rolleston (great-great-uncle); James Wilson (great-great-uncle); Joseph Brittan (great-great-grandfather)
- Education: SOAS, University of London

Francis Ormond Wilson (born 1946) is a retired New Zealand diplomat. During his career, he served as head of mission in Moscow, Santiago, and Hong Kong.

== Early life and family ==
Wilson was born in 1946, the son of politician, farmer and author Ormond Wilson and his second wife, author Rosamond Rolleston. He was educated at Christ's College in Christchurch from 1960 to 1964, and completed a Master of Arts degree in the School of Oriental and African Studies at the University of London in 1970.

== Career ==
Wilson joined the Ministry of Foreign Affairs in 1971, and remained in the public service until his retirement in 2006. He was second secretary at the New Zealand embassy in Saigon in 1975, and was the last New Zealand diplomatic representative to leave South Vietnam on 22 April 1975, shortly before the fall of Saigon, having been instrumental in arranging the evacuation of New Zealanders and Vietnamese people with New Zealand connections. Wilson's other postings in Asia were to Bangkok and, from 2001 to 2005 in Hong Kong where he served as New Zealand's consul-general. Between 1981 and 1984, Wilson was the New Zealand chargé d'affaires in Moscow, and from 1992 until 1996 he was ambassador in Santiago.

Wilson also served at various times at the head of the Asia section of the New Zealand Overseas Development Agency, the Asia section of the External Assessments Bureau within the Prime Minister's Department, and the South and Southeast Asia division of the Ministry of Foreign Affairs and Trade (MFAT).

After his retirement, Wilson was appointed as a special advisor to MFAT, and was a member of the ASEAN Regional Forum expert and eminent persons group.
