= Judith Trotter =

New Zealand diplomat (1935–2026)

Judith Trotter CNZM

Ambassador of New Zealand to Italy
- In office 1994–1998
- Preceded by: Peter Bennett
- Succeeded by: Peter Bennett

Ambassador of New Zealand to France
- In office 1988–1992
- Preceded by: John McArthur
- Succeeded by: Chris Beeby

Personal details
- Born: 30 August 1935 Hāwera, New Zealand
- Died: 5 April 2026 (aged 90) Wellington, New Zealand
- Relatives: Ann Trotter (sister); Ron Trotter (brother)
- Education: University of Otago
- Awards: New Zealand 1990 Commemoration Medal; New Zealand Suffrage Centennial Medal 1993

Judith Catherine Trotter CNZM (30 August 1935 – 5 April 2026) was a New Zealand diplomat. In 1996, Trotter was appointed a Companion of the New Zealand Order of Merit for services to diplomacy. She was also awarded a New Zealand 1990 Commemoration Medal, a New Zealand Suffrage Centennial Medal, and France's National Order of Merit.

== Early life and education ==
Trotter was the youngest of four children of Pan and Clement Trotter, and grew up in Hāwera. Trotter's sister Ann Trotter was a professor of history and the first woman to be appointed pro vice-chancellor of the University of Otago. Her brother Ron Trotter was knighted for his service to business in 1985. Trotter was educated at St Cuthbert's College in Auckland, where she was head prefect in 1953. Trotter then earned a Bachelor of Arts at the University of Otago in 1957.

== Diplomatic career ==
Trotter was at the Ministry of Foreign Affairs and Trade between 1965 and 1998, serving in New Zealand and in Athens, Bangkok, Singapore, France, Canada and Italy. During her time in France she was at the OECD, and was New Zealand's ambassador to France between 1987 and 1992, and then ambassador to Italy. She was chair of the France–New Zealand Friendship Fund.

== Death ==
Trotter died in Wellington on 5 April 2026, at the age of 90.

== Honours and awards ==
Trotter was awarded a New Zealand 1990 Commemoration Medal, which was given to people "in recognition of the contribution they have made to some aspect of New Zealand life". In 1993 Trotter was awarded a New Zealand Suffrage Centennial Medal, which was given to "recognize those New Zealand and Commonwealth citizens who had made a significant contribution to women's rights or women's issues in New Zealand".

In the 1996 Queen's Birthday Honours, Trotter was appointed a Companion of the New Zealand Order of Merit, for services to diplomacy.

Trotter was recognised by France with a National Order of Merit in 2010.
