= Tony Small =

Tony Small may refer to:

- Tony Small (diplomat)
- Tony Small (athlete)

== See also ==
- Anthony Small, boxer and Islamic political activist
