= Vicki Poole =

New Zealand diplomat

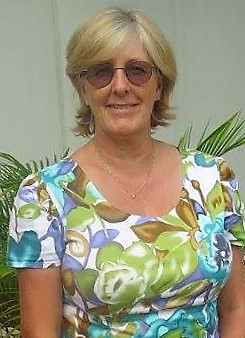
Vicki Poole in 2016

Vicki Barbara Poole is a New Zealand diplomat. In 2015 she was appointed the New Zealand ambassador to Timor-Leste.

== Life ==
Poole has held the position of Deputy Director for Pacific Development in the Ministry of Foreign Affairs and Trade, and has served in the New Zealand delegation to the OECD in Paris.
