= Rosemary Banks =

New Zealand diplomat (born 1951)

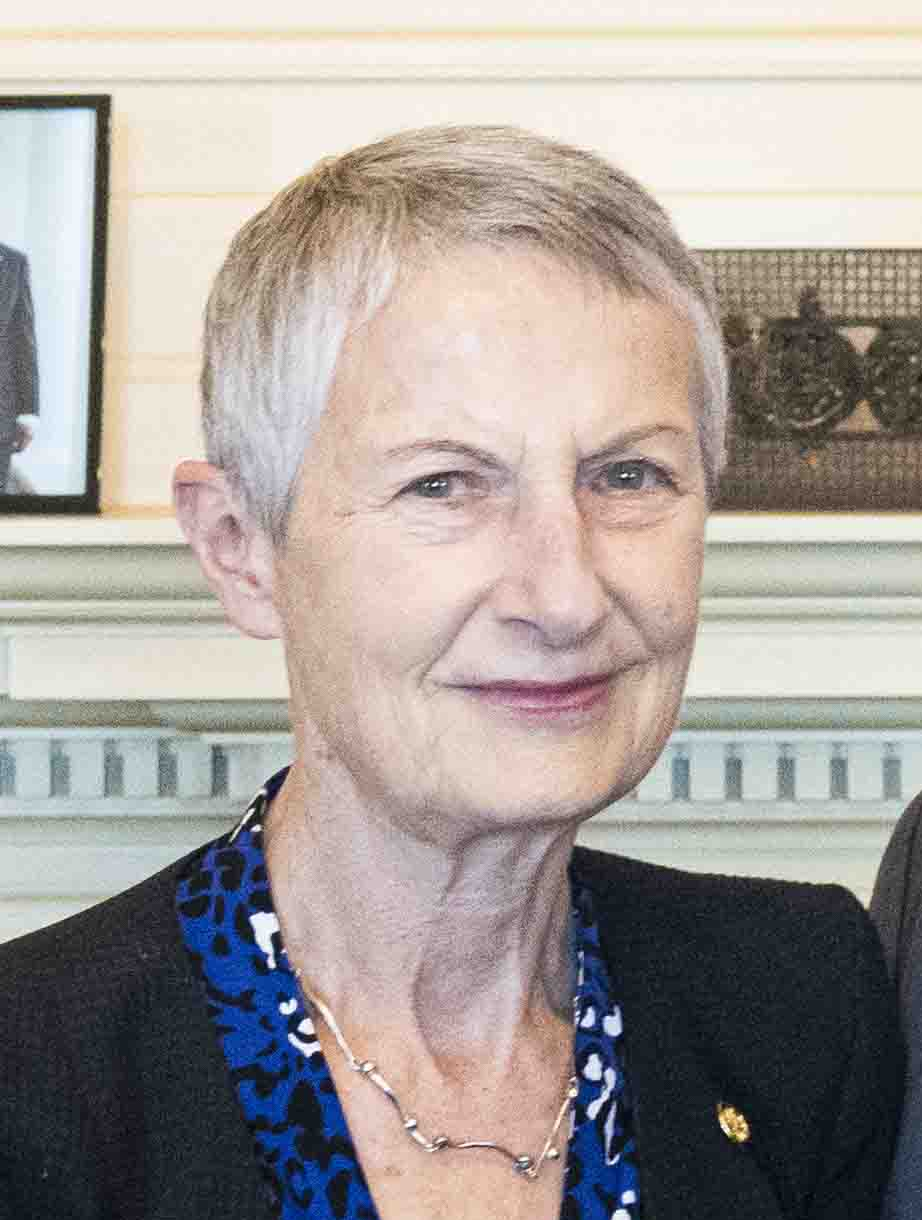
- Banks in 2024

18th New Zealand Ambassador to the United States
- In office 17 June 2024 – 18 February 2026
- Prime Minister: Christopher Luxon
- Preceded by: Bede Corry
- Succeeded by: Chris Seed
- In office 11 January 2019 – September 2022
- Prime Minister: Jacinda Ardern
- Preceded by: Tim Groser
- Succeeded by: Bede Corry

Personal details
- Born: 1951 (age 74–75)
- Spouse: Brian Lockstone
- Education: University of Canterbury; London School of Economics

Rosemary Banks (born 1951) is a New Zealand diplomat who served as the 18th ambassador of New Zealand to the United States from 2019 to 2022, and again from 2024 to 2026. She is the first woman to have served in the role.

== Education ==
Banks graduated with an MA in Russian from the University of Canterbury, and received an MSc from the London School of Economics. She was awarded an honorary doctorate of literature by the University of Canterbury in April 2015.

== Career ==
Banks served as New Zealand deputy high commissioner to the Solomon Islands between 1985 and 1987, and to Australia from 1992 until 1995.

As deputy secretary in New Zealand's Ministry of Foreign Affairs and Trade, Banks spearheaded the development of a new emergency response system, following the September 11 attacks in 2001, the 2002 Bali bombings, and the 2004 Boxing Day tsunami.

She was New Zealand's Permanent Representative to the United Nations in New York from June 2005 to June 2009, and Ambassador to France and Permanent Representative to the OECD from 2010 to 2014. In 2018, Banks succeeded Tim Groser as New Zealand ambassador to the United States. She served in that capacity until 2022 and was reappointed in 2024, succeeding Bede Corry. Her second term will end in early 2026 when the appointment of Chris Seed takes effect.

Banks has also served as a Crown negotiator for the Treaty of Waitangi settlement process from 2016 to 2018.

== Personal life ==
Banks was married to the political journalist and historian Brian Lockstone until his death, aged 77, in December 2021.

Diplomatic posts
Preceded by Don MacKay	Permanent Representative to the United Nations in New York; 2005–2009	Succeeded by Jim McLay
Preceded by Tim Groser	Ambassador of New Zealand to the United States; 2019–2022; 2024–present	Succeeded by Bede Corry
Preceded by Bede Corry	Ambassador of New Zealand to the United States; 2019–2022; 2024–present	Incumbent
