= List of ambassadors of New Zealand to Chile =

The Ambassador from New Zealand to Chile is New Zealand's foremost diplomatic representative in the Republic of Chile, and in charge of New Zealand's diplomatic mission in Chile.

The embassy is located in Santiago, Chile's capital city. New Zealand has maintained a resident ambassador in Chile since 1973. The Ambassador to Chile is concurrently accredited to Colombia and Peru.

== List of heads of mission ==
=== Ambassadors to Chile ===
- John G. McArthur (1973–1975)
- Ken Cunningham (1975–1976)

=== Chargés d'Affaires in Chile ===
- David Holborow (1976–1978)

=== Ambassadors to Chile ===
- David Holborow (1978–1981)
- Ian Landon-Lane (1981–1985)
- Barry Brooks (1985–1988)
- Paul Tipping (1988–1992)
- Francis Ormond Wilson (1992–1996)
- David McGee (1996–2000)
- Richard Mann (2000–2005)
- Nigel Fyfe (2005 - 2009)
- Rosemary Paterson (2009-2012?)
- John Capper (August 2012- March 2015)
- Jacqui Caine (March 2015 – 2018)
- Linda Te Puni (December 2018 – 2023)

== See also ==
- Chile–New Zealand relations
