= C. E. Beeby =

New Zealand diplomat and educationalist (1902–1998)

C. E. Beeby ONZ CMG
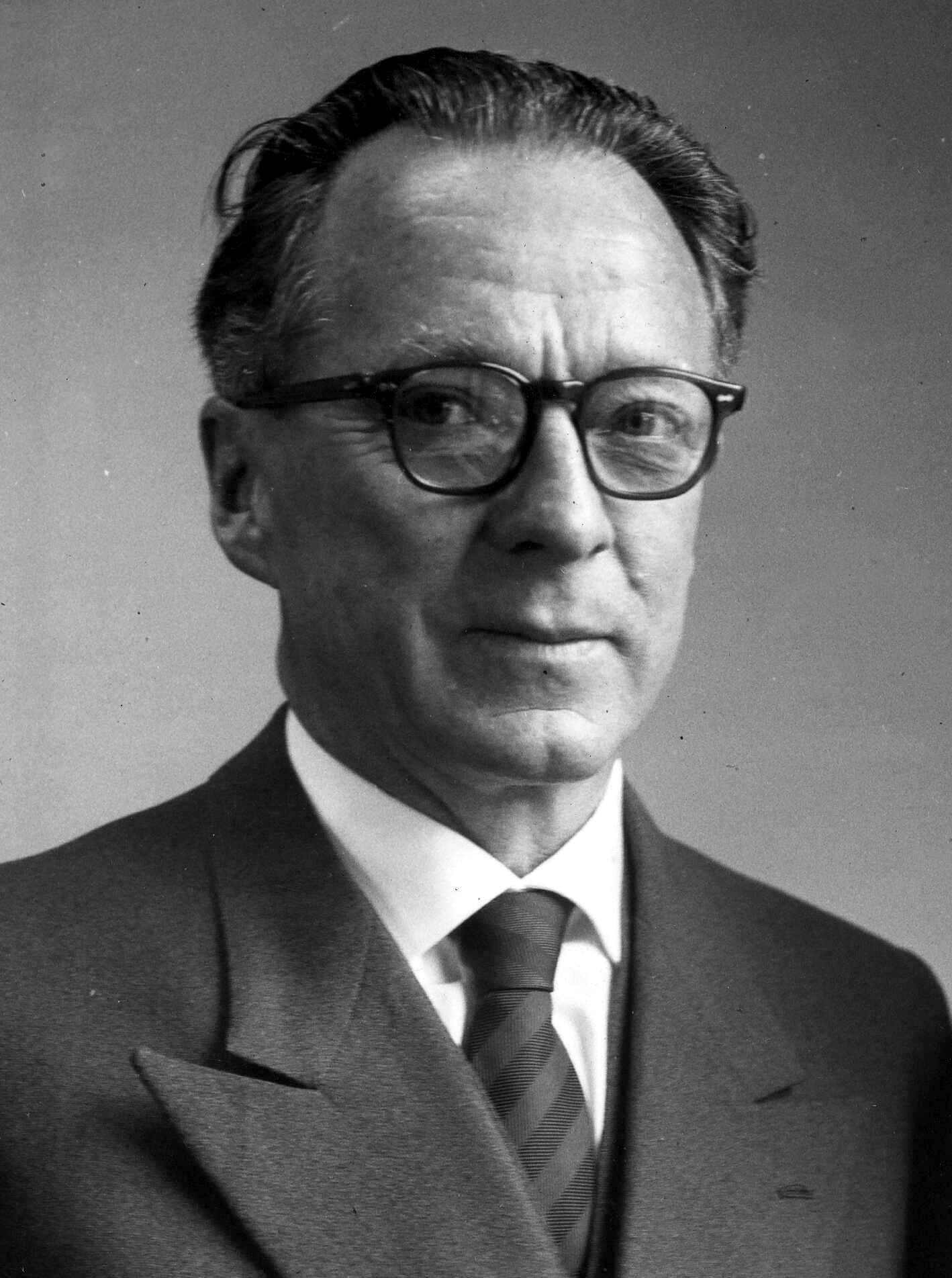
- Beeby in 1959

4th New Zealand Ambassador to France
- In office 1960–1964
- Prime Minister: Walter Nash; Keith Holyoake
- Preceded by: Joseph Vivian Wilson
- Succeeded by: Charles Craw

Personal details
- Born: Clarence Edward Beeby; 16 June 1902 Meanwood, Yorkshire, England
- Died: 10 March 1998 (aged 95)
- Spouse: Beatrice Newnham (m. 1926; died 1991)
- Occupation: Educationalist
- Known for: The development of the education system in New Zealand

Clarence Edward Beeby ONZ CMG (16 June 1902 – 10 March 1998), sometimes referred to as Beeb, was a New Zealand educationalist and psychologist. He was influential in the development of the education system in New Zealand, first as a director of the New Zealand Council for Educational Research (NZCER) from 1936, and then as Director of Education (head of the Ministry of Education) from 1940, initially under the First Labour Government. He also served as ambassador to France and on the UNESCO executive.

Beeby's wife Beatrice was one of the founders of the New Zealand Playcentre movement, and his son was the distinguished New Zealand diplomat and international lawyer, Chris Beeby, portrayed in Ben Affleck's film, Argo.

== Early life and education ==
Beeby was born in Meanwood, Leeds, Yorkshire, and immigrated with his family to New Zealand in 1906. He was educated at New Brighton School and Christchurch Boys' High School, and initially studied law at Canterbury College, before switching to Christchurch Training College to study primary teaching. Beeby met Beatrice Newnham while they were both undergraduate students and they were married in 1926. Beeby gained an MA in 1924, with a thesis titled The psychology of laughter and the comic. and had been working as a part-time lecturer during the latter part of his studies. He worked for a PhD at Victoria University of Manchester, under the tutelage of Charles Spearman. Spearman's belief in a strong hereditary component to intelligence was to influence Beeby's later educational beliefs. Beeby was not fond of his given names, and elected from an early age to be known by his surname.

== Career ==
On returning from England, Beeby worked as a lecturer and then acting professor at Canterbury College, before taking up the position of director of NZCER. During this time, he developed a belief that all students had a right to continuing education, not just the most academically gifted. During this period, Beeby was noticed by Peter Fraser, the minister of education, and in 1939 was appointed assistant director of education. Beeby became director of education just prior to Fraser's ascension to prime minister.

After leaving the Ministry of Education, he served as ambassador to France from 1960 to 1963, and also was assistant director-general for UNESCO. Following the end of this term, he held positions at Harvard University and the Institute of Education University of London. In 1968 he returned to New Zealand, and continued to play an active role as researcher and consultant in both New Zealand and overseas. Beeby had a close working relationship with Bill Renwick, Director-General of Education from 1975 to 1987, and the two reviewed and discussed each other's work. Renwick wrote Portrait of a Reforming Director for The Beeby Fascicles, presented to Beeby on his 90th birthday, and described Beeby as "his most thoughtful and constructive critic".

== Honours and awards ==
Beeby was awarded the Queen Elizabeth II Coronation Medal in 1953. In the 1956 Queen's Birthday Honours, he was appointed a Companion of the Order of St Michael and St George, and in 1964 he was made a Knight Grand Cross of the Order of St Gregory the Great. On 6 February 1987, Beeby was the second appointee to the Order of New Zealand, New Zealand's highest civilian honour. In 1990, he was awarded the New Zealand 1990 Commemoration Medal. He received honorary doctorates from the University of Canterbury, University of Otago, and Victoria University of Wellington.

Diplomatic posts
Preceded by Joseph Vivian Wilson	New Zealand Ambassador to France; 1960–1964	Succeeded by Charles Craw
