= Tony Small (diplomat) =

New Zealand diplomat (1930–2015)

New Zealand Ambassador to Austria
- In office 19 December 1977 – 1 January 1982
- Preceded by: Basil Bolt
- Succeeded by: Hugo Judd

New Zealand Ambassador to China
- In office 1982–1985
- Preceded by: Harle Freeman-Greene
- Succeeded by: Lindsay Johnstone Watt

New Zealand Ambassador to Italy
- In office 2 May 1986 – 1990
- Preceded by: Gordon Parkinson
- Succeeded by: Peter Robert Bennett

Personal details
- Born: Francis Anthony Small; 28 August 1930
- Died: 24 February 2015 (aged 84)

Francis Anthony Small (28 August 1930 – 24 February 2015) was a New Zealand diplomat. He was ambassador to Austria, China, and Italy.

== Biography ==
Small was born in Upper Hutt on 28 August 1930. He was the son of Francis Joseph Dumain Small and Honora Ann (née McCarthy). He received his education at St Joseph's School in Upper Hutt and St Patrick's College in Silverstream. He obtained a Bachelor of Laws from Victoria University College in 1955. He graduated with a Master of Laws from Harvard Law School in 1965.

While an undergraduate student, he worked for the legal firm of Swan & Davies in 1952 and 1953. In 1954, he joined the Department of External Affairs. In 1963, Small was acting head of the legal division of the Department of External Affairs. From 1969 to 1976, he was New Zealand's deputy permanent representative at the Headquarters of the United Nations in New York City. From 19 December 1977 to 1982, he was ambassador in Vienna with accreditation in Warsaw, East Berlin and Budapest. From 1982 to 1985, he was ambassador in Beijing, and from 1986 to 1990, he was ambassador in Rome with accreditation in Madrid.

Small died on 24 February 2015, and was buried at Clareville Cemetery, Carterton.
