= Hamish MacMaster =

New Zealand diplomat

The Honourable Hamish MacMaster

New Zealand Ambassador to Iran
- In office 24 August 2004 – 19 February 2009
- Prime Minister: Helen Clark; John Key
- Preceded by: Niels Holm
- Succeeded by: Brian Sanders

New Zealand Ambassador to Saudi Arabia
- Incumbent
- Assumed office 19 July 2013
- Prime Minister: John Key; Bill English; Jacinda Ardern
- Preceded by: Rod Harris

Personal details
- Born: 1960/1961
- Occupation: Diplomat

Hamish MacMaster is a New Zealand diplomat. He is currently serving as New Zealand's ambassador to the Kingdom of Saudi Arabia.

== Early life ==
MacMaster attended St. Andrews College from 1966 until 1979, indicating Years 1 through to 13.

== Career ==
=== Pre 2004 ===
MacMaster joined the public service in 1988, starting in the Ministry of Foreign Affairs and Trade. He was posted to Ankara and to Riyadh for minor roles before 2004.

In 2004, MacMaster was the deputy director of the Middle East and Africa Division.

=== Ambassador roles ===
MacMaster became New Zealand's ambassador to the Islamic Republic of Iran in 2004. During his time in Tehran, MacMaster was also accredited to Afghanistan and Pakistan. After being recalled from his position as Ambassador to Iran in 2009, MacMaster resettled in Wellington.

In 2013, MacMaster was announced as the new Ambassador to Saudi Arabia. During his tenure, he was also cross-credited to Kuwait, Qatar, Bahrain and Oman.

On 9 April 2015, MacMaster met with Prince Al-Waleed Bin Talal Bin Abdulaziz Al Saud to discuss issues between New Zealand and Saudi Arabia in relation to investment and investment economics.

On 13 January 2016, MacMaster met with Mufleh Al-Qahtani, Chairman of the National Society for Human Rights of Saudi Arabia. He discussed capital punishment, including the death penalty, and other human rights-related topics.

== Works ==
MacMaster has been accredited to authoring multiple catalogs/books, including;

- The Modern Commemorative Medal in New Zealand: Mirror to the Nation’s Soul (2009)
- New Zealand challenge coins : a catalogue (2011)
- New Zealand Commemorative Medals : 1941–2014 (2014)
- New Zealand Challenge Coins : a Catalogue (2nd Ed) (2016)
