= Philip Turner (diplomat) =

New Zealand public servant and diplomat

Philip Turner (born 1960) is a New Zealand former public servant and diplomat. He spent his childhood in Auckland and was educated at St Peter's College and Auckland University. Turner worked for the New Zealand Ministry of Foreign Affairs from 1986 to 1999. He held various senior management positions in Fonterra from 2000, culminating as Fonterra director of global stakeholder affairs from 2015 to 2018. Turner was the New Zealand ambassador to Korea (North Korea and South Korea), resident in Seoul from April 2018. His term in Seoul ended in February 2023 and he has pursued advisory, academic and journalistic activities relating to Japan, Korea and China since that time from bases in Tokyo and Wellington.
