= Mary Thurston =

New Zealand diplomat

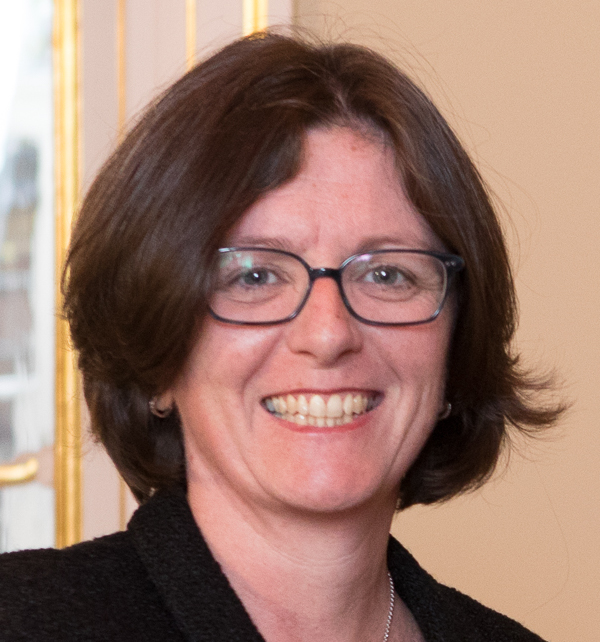
Mary Thurston

Mary Patricia Thurston is a career diplomat with the country of New Zealand.

Thurston attended Oxford University where she studied English and French for a Bachelor of Arts (Honours) degree. She speaks French, Spanish and Solomon Islands Pijin.

Thurston was previously Deputy High Commissioner at the New Zealand High Commission in Singapore and Deputy Special Coordinator of the Regional Assistance Mission to Solomon Islands (RAMSI). From 2016 to 2021, she was the ambassador of New Zealand to Poland. Via this office, she was also ambassador to Estonia, Georgia, Latvia, Lithuania, and Ukraine.

On 19 November 2022, Thurston was announced as New Zealand's Consul-General in Nouméa.
