= Chris Beeby =

New Zealand diplomat

Christopher Beeby

Ambassador of New Zealand to Iran
- In office 15 May 1978 – 15 June 1980

New Zealand Deputy-Secretary of Foreign Affairs
- In office 1985–1991

Ambassador of New Zealand to France
- In office 1991–1996

Member of the Appellate Body
- In office 1995 – 19 March 2000

Personal details
- Born: October 1935 Wellington, New Zealand
- Died: 19 March 2000 (aged 64) Geneva, Switzerland
- Parent(s): Beatrice Beeby (mother); C. E. Beeby (father)

Christopher David Beeby (October 1935 – 19 March 2000) was a New Zealand diplomat who held several ambassadorships and was involved in international litigation and negotiations, notably over Antarctic resources. Beeby was New Zealand's ambassador to Iran (1978 to 1980) and to France (1991 to 1996) and was a member of the World Trade Organization's Appellate Body from 1995 to his death in 2000. While ambassador to Iran, Beeby assisted American diplomats in the Iran hostage crisis.

== Early life and education ==
Christopher David Beeby was born on 10 or 15 October 1935, in Wellington, New Zealand, to C. E. Beeby and Beatrice Beeby. He attended the Victoria University of Wellington and the London School of Economics.

== Career ==
He entered the New Zealand Department of Foreign Affairs in 1963 as a legal adviser, first working on the New Zealand Australia Free Trade Agreement. He was promoted to a divisional head in the department's legal division in 1969 and headed the economic division from 1976 to 1978.

Beeby worked to draft anti-nuclear legislation for New Zealand and served as counsel for New Zealand in the International Court of Justice during the Nuclear Tests Case in 1973 and 1974. As Ambassador of New Zealand to Iran from 15 May 1978 to 15 June 1980, Beeby was involved in the Iran hostage crisis in 1979, when he, as ambassador, and another employee at the New Zealand embassy, Richard Sewell, helped several American diplomats escape to safety. The New Zealand Herald named Beeby and Sewell the "New Zealanders of the Year for 1979" for their actions. In 1983 Beeby chaired several negotiations on the Convention on the Regulation of Antarctic Mineral Resource Activities. He spent six years working towards a convention that eventually manifested as the Protocol on Environmental Protection to the Antarctic Treaty.

He was involved in the Rainbow Warrior Case in 1989 to 1990. Beeby was Deputy-Secretary of Foreign Affairs from 1985 to 1991 and Ambassador of New Zealand to France (1992 to 1995). While living in Paris, in 1993 Beeby's offices were raided by French farmers. He was also at one point New Zealand's Permanent Representative to the OECD. In 1995 he attempted to mediate an end to the Pacific Salmon War between Canada and the United States, but was unsuccessful. That same year he was appointed as an original member of the World Trade Organization's Appellate Body, which he chaired in 1998. He was still serving upon his death.

== Death ==
He died on 19 March 2000 at the age of 64, in Geneva. Phil Goff, then Foreign Minister of New Zealand, said that “Chris Beeby was widely regarded as an exceptional diplomat and one of the best international lawyers of modern times.” Beeby Peak in Antarctica is named after him.
