= List of high commissioners of New Zealand to South Africa =

The high commissioner of New Zealand to South Africa is New Zealand's foremost diplomatic representative in the Republic of South Africa, and in charge of New Zealand's diplomatic mission in South Africa.

The high commission is located in Pretoria, one of South Africa's three capital cities, where New Zealand has maintained a resident high commissioner in South Africa only since 1996. This is due to New Zealand's refusal to accredit a high commissioner (or an ambassador from 1961 to 1994) to South Africa during the Apartheid era as a matter of principle. The high commissioner to South Africa is concurrently accredited to Botswana, Kenya, Lesotho, Mauritius, Mozambique, Namibia, Swaziland, Tanzania, Zambia, and Zimbabwe. Thus, despite being one of New Zealand's youngest diplomatic missions, diplomatic relations with more countries are within its remit than within any other.

As fellow members of the Commonwealth of Nations, diplomatic relations between New Zealand and South Africa are at governmental level, rather than between heads of state. Thus, the countries exchange high commissioners, rather than ambassadors.

== List of heads of mission ==
=== High commissioners to South Africa ===
==== Non-resident high commissioners to South Africa, resident in Zimbabwe ====
- Brian Absolum (1994–1996)

==== Resident high commissioners to South Africa ====
- Brian Absolum (1996–1999)
- René Wilson (1999–2003)
- Warren Searell (2003–2006)
- Malcolm McGoun (2006–2008)
- Geoff Randal (2008–2012)
- Richard Mann (2012–2016)
- Mike Burrell (2016-2019)
- Sarah Lee (2019-2021)
- Emma Dunlop-Bennett (2022-2023)
