= Neil Walter =

New Zealand diplomat (1942–2026)

Neil Walter CNZM

Administrator of Tokelau
- In office 1988–1990
- Prime Minister: David Lange, Geoffrey Palmer
- Preceded by: Tim Francis
- Succeeded by: Graham Ansell
- In office 1 March 2003 – 17 October 2006
- Prime Minister: Helen Clark
- Preceded by: Lindsay Johnstone Watt
- Succeeded by: David Payton

Ambassador of New Zealand to Indonesia
- In office 1990–1994
- Prime Minister: Jim Bolger
- Preceded by: Gordon Parkinson
- Succeeded by: Tim Groser

Ambassador of New Zealand to Japan
- In office 1997–1999
- Prime Minister: Jenny Shipley
- Preceded by: Maarten Wevers
- Succeeded by: Phillip Gibson

Secretary of Foreign Affairs
- In office 1999–2002
- Prime Minister: Jenny Shipley, Helen Clark
- Preceded by: Richard Nottage
- Succeeded by: Simon Murdoch

Personal details
- Born: Neil Douglas Walter; 11 December 1942 Stratford, New Zealand
- Died: 29 August 2026 (aged 83) Waikanae, New Zealand
- Relatives: David Walter (brother); Edward Walter (grandfather); Jack Walter (uncle); Alan Smith (cousin)

Neil Douglas Walter CNZM (11 December 1942 – 29 August 2026) was a New Zealand diplomat and public servant. He twice served as Administrator of Tokelau, a territory of New Zealand, from February 1988 until 1990, and again from 1 March 2003 to 17 October 2006.

== Background ==
Walter was born in Stratford on 11 December 1942, the son of Anita Walter (née Frethey) and Edward Ernest Walter. He was the grandson of former County Chairman and Member of Parliament Edward Walter, brother of local politician David Walter, nephew of All Black Jack Walter, and cousin of All Black Alan Smith.

He studied at the University of Auckland, graduating with a Bachelor of Arts degree in 1964.

Walter married Berys Anne Robertson, and the couple went on to have one son and two daughters. Their son, Stephen Walter, is a lead negotiator on climate change for the New Zealand Ministry of Environment.

== Career ==
In his early career in the Foreign Service, Walter served in Thailand, New York, and Samoa. In 1981, Walter was posted to New Zealand's Embassy in Paris, where he was the New Zealand Permanent Representative to UNESCO. In 1985, Walter became New Zealand's deputy High Commissioner to London.

Walter was New Zealand's Ambassador to Indonesia from 1990 to 1994, and served as New Zealand's Ambassador to Japan from 1997 to 1999. In 1999, Walter became Secretary of the New Zealand Ministry of Foreign Affairs, until his retirement from the diplomatic service in 2002. He was one of three people to address the United Nations Special Committee on Decolonization, 10th Meeting, 23 June 2003.

He was the chairman of the Environmental Risk Management Authority until 2008 and the chair of NZ On Air from 2007 to 2012. He also undertook various reviews and assessments for the NZ Government. His 2009 report on the State Services Commission's ambitious and ill-fated GSN information technology project led to the resignation of the Deputy State Services Commissioner and Government CIO Laurence Millar.

== Later life and death ==
In retirement, Walter lived in Waikanae. His wife, Berys Walter, died on 6 June 2026.

Neil Walter died at his home in Waikanae, on 29 August 2026, at the age of 83.

== Honours and awards ==
In the 2002 Queen's Birthday and Golden Jubilee Honours, Walter was appointed a Companion of the New Zealand Order of Merit, for services as Secretary of Foreign Affairs and Trade.

Government offices
Preceded by Tim Francis	Administrator of Tokelau; 1988–1990; 2003–2006	Succeeded by Graham Ansell
Preceded by Lindsay Watt	Administrator of Tokelau; 1988–1990; 2003–2006	Succeeded by David Payton
