= Harle Freeman-Greene =

New Zealand diplomat

Harle Freeman-Greene LVO

Ambassador to China
- In office 1979–1982
- Preceded by: Richard Atkins
- Succeeded by: Francis Anthony Small

High Commissioner to Malaysia
- In office 1982–1985
- Preceded by: Michael Mansfield
- Succeeded by: Ray Jermyn

Ambassador to Thailand
- In office 1988–1992
- Preceded by: Bruce Brown
- Succeeded by: Phillip Gibson

Ambassador to the Philippines
- In office 1992–1995
- Preceded by: Alison Stokes
- Succeeded by: Colin Bell

Personal details
- Born: 26 March 1934 (age 92) Christchurch, New Zealand
- Spouse: Christine Robyn Robyn Brown
- Children: 3

Harle Freeman-Greene LVO (born 26 March 1934) is a former New Zealand diplomat. He is the son of Henrietta Harle (née Giles) and Harry Freeman-Greene. He was educated at Cathedral Grammar School Christchurch, St. Andrew's College, Christchurch and received his BA in 1995 from the University of Canterbury and an LLB in 1960 from the Victoria University of Wellington.

- From 1955 to 1958 he was employed from Shell Oil Co.
- In 1958 he joined New Zealand's Ministry of Foreign Affairs and Trade.
- From 1958 to 1974 he was posted in London, Western Samoa and Bangkok.
- From 1975 to 1977 he was consul general in New York.
- From 1979 to 1982 he was ambassador in Beijing.
- From 1982 to 1985 he was high commissioner in Kuala Lumpur (Malaysia) with accreditation in Bandar Seri Begawan (Brunei).
- From 1985 to 1988 he was assistant secretary of the Ministry of Foreign Affairs and Trade.
- From 1988 to 1992 he was ambassador in Bangkok (Thailand) with accreditation in Hanoi (Vietnam), Vientiane (Laos) and Yangon (Burma).
- From 1992 to 1995 he was ambassador in Manila (Philippines).

Freeman-Greene was a member of the Royal Household for two years, as assistant press secretary at Buckingham Palace, and accompanied the Queen on the 1963 royal tour of New Zealand. In 1964, he was appointed a member of the Royal Victorian Order, fourth class; in 1984, members of the Royal Victorian Order, fourth class, were redesignated as lieutenants of the Royal Victorian Order.
