= Jim Weir (diplomat) =

New Zealand diplomat (1922–2012)

James Harrison Weir (8 June 1922 – 19 November 2012) was a New Zealand diplomat.

Weir was born in Christchurch. He graduated in history from the University of Canterbury with a thesis on the function and development of the press in New Zealand. After this, he joined the New Zealand Diplomatic Service in 1947, where he was one of “Mac’s Team”, the original group recruited by Alister McIntosh to establish a New Zealand presence overseas.

He established a presence in overlooked regions; Southeast Asia, North Africa and the Middle East. He was posted or cross-accredited to or spent substantial time in Cairo, Kuala Lumpur, Malta, New York, Ottawa, Rangoon, Riyadh, Singapore, and Washington D.C. On the trade front, he was involved with wrangling in Brussels and other capitals over continued access to European markets for dairy and meat products.

His most notable appointment was as ambassador to Moscow from 1977 to 1980, until he was expelled as a tit-for-tat when the Soviet ambassador Vsevolod Sofinsky was expelled for passing funds to the pro-Soviet Socialist Unity Party of New Zealand.

He wrote two books of recollections and three of New Zealand quotations.

He died in Wellington. His wife Mary (Mollie) predeceased him; they are survived by a son and three daughters.

== Books by Jim Weir ==
- Letters from Moscow (1988)
- New Zealand Wit and Wisdom (1998)
- Strong Language (2007)
- Eat, Drink and be Wary (2011)
- Quotable New Zealand Quotes (2012)
