= Jane Coombs =

New Zealand diplomat

Jane Coombs is a New Zealand diplomat who was Ambassador to South Korea and has been the Permanent Representative to the Organization for Economic Co-Operation and Development (OECD) since September 2017. She is cross accredited to France, Monaco, Portugal and Senegal.

Coombs studied at St Hilda's Collegiate School.
