= David Payton =

Former administrator of Tokelau (born 1952)

David Bruce Payton (born 1951 or 1952) is a former New Zealand diplomat who served as Administrator of Tokelau from 17 October 2006 to 2009.

Payton was educated at the University of Otago. He served as editor of Critic Te Ārohi in 1973, and was later president of Otago University Students' Association. He joined the Ministry of Foreign Affairs in 1975, where he worked in the aid division assisting Niue. From 1977-79 he was posted the New Zealand High Commission in Nuku'alofa, Tonga. He also served as Senior Advisor to the Secretary-General for the International Conference on Population and Development as part of the United Nations Population Fund (from 1992-1994) based in New York. He was also on the New Zealand Delegation to the historic Rio Summit in 1993 led by New Zealand diplomat, Terence O'Brien. From 1997 to 2000 he was New Zealand Ambassador to Saudi Arabia, and from 2002 to 2006 Ambassador to the Netherlands.

He was appointed Administrator of Tokelau in October 2006. He became administrator in the aftermath of the failed 2006 Tokelauan self-determination referendum, and talks on a second referendum were a priority on his appointment. A second referendum was held in 2007, which also failed.

He retired from the Ministry of Foreign Affairs and Trade (MFAT) in 2014 at the age of 62, after spending the last few years of his career (2011-2014) working in New York (for the second time) for the United Nations Development Programme (UNDP) on issues related to development in Small Island Developing States (SIDs).

Preceded by Neil Walter	Administrator of Tokelau; 2006–2009	Succeeded by John Allen
