= Richard Woods (diplomat) =

New Zealand diplomat and public servant

Edward Richard Woods, CNZM (born 20 September 1941, Greymouth) is a New Zealand diplomat and public servant. He is currently Chair of the Board of the Environmental Risk Management Authority, a New Zealand Government Agency that ensures compliance with the Hazardous Substances and New Organisms Act – HSNO Act 1996. He took over as chairman on the retirement of Neil Walter.

Woods was awarded the Companions of the New Zealand Order of Merit in 2007 for public services, lately as director of the New Zealand Security Intelligence Service, he was previously a diplomat with the Ministry of Foreign Affairs and Trade.

In 1961, Woods graduated with a BA from the University of Canterbury. This was followed by another BA (which was upgraded to an MA) from Brasenose College, Oxford in 1965.

Richard was married to Joanna Proby in 1970, they have two sons and five grandchildren. Three from one son, two from the other.

== Roles ==
- 2008– Chair, New Zealand Environmental Risk Management Authority (ERMA)
- 2008– New Zealand co-Chair, New Zealand/France Friendship Fund
- 2008– Trustee, Henry and William Williams Memorial Trust
- 2007– Trustee, Henry and William Williams Museum Trust
- 1999–2006 Director and CEO, New Zealand Security Intelligence Service
- 1995–99 Ambassador, Paris, and Permanent Representative to OECD
- 1993–95 Ambassador, Moscow
- 1991–93 Director, Development Cooperation, Ministry of Foreign Affairs and Trade (MFAT)
- 1990–91 Director, Middle East and Africa, MFAT
- 1988–90 Ambassador, Athens
- 1984–87 Ambassador, Tehran
- 1982–84 Deputy Head of Mission, Washington DC
- 1980–81 Deputy Director, External Aid, Ministry of Foreign Affairs (MFA)
- 1977–79 Consul-General, Bahrain
- 1975–77 First Secretary, Tehran
- 1973–74 First Secretary, MFA
- 1968–72 Assistant Trade Commissioner, Rome
- 1966–68 Advisory Officer, Department of Industries and Commerce
