= Adrian Macey =

New Zealand diplomat

Adrian Macey, (b. Sutton Coldfield, England 6 December 1948) is a New Zealand diplomat.

Macey was educated at the University of Canterbury, where he received an MA in French, the Ecole Nationale d’Administration, where he received a Maitrise de Lettres Tours, and the University of Otago, where he received a PhD in French for his thesis on the 18th century philosopher Denis Diderot.

From 1977 to 1981, Macey was New Zealand's deputy permanent delegate to UNESCO in Paris. In 1985, he was appointed Official Secretary to the Government of Tokelau. In 1987, he became Counsellor (economic) and Consul-General at New Zealand's embassy in Geneva, where he was a New Zealand negotiator in the Uruguay Round for dispute settlement. Apart from Macey's WTO responsibilities, he also represented New Zealand at the International Labour Organization.

In 1991, Macey returned to Wellington to the position of director of personnel, responsible for human resource management issues in the Ministry. In 1996, he was appointed New Zealand's Ambassador to Bangkok. In 2000, Macey became New Zealand's principal trade negotiator, responsible for managing all New Zealand's WTO negotiations.

In 2002, Macey became New Zealand's Ambassador to France and Permanent Representative to the OECD. While posted in France, Macey played a key role in the return of the Unknown Warrior to New Zealand. In 2006, Foreign Minister Winston Peters appointed Macey to the new post of Climate Change Ambassador, where he coordinated New Zealand's international negotiations on climate change, and assisted the Government in making an effective contribution to international efforts. In June 2010 he was elected to the position of Vice Chair of the UNFCCC Kyoto Protocol negotiations, and in December 2010 was made chair. He is also Senior Associate at the Victoria University of Wellington Institute of Policy Studies and an adjunct professor at the New Zealand Climate Change Research Institute.
