= Joseph Vivian Wilson =

New Zealand public servant and diplomat (1894–1977)

Joseph Vivian Wilson (1894–1977) was a New Zealand public servant and diplomat, and the New Zealand ambassador to France. He was born in Greendale, North Canterbury, New Zealand in 1894.

In 1953, Wilson was awarded the Queen Elizabeth II Coronation Medal.
