= Brook Barrington =

New Zealand public servant and diplomat

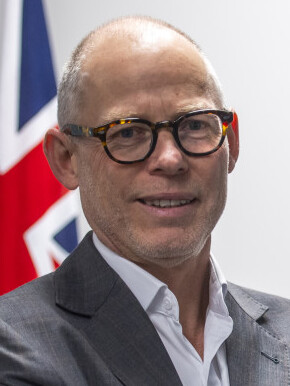
- Official Secretary of Defence portrait (2024)

New Zealand Secretary of Defence
- Incumbent
- Assumed office 1 July 2024
- Preceded by: Andrew Bridgman

Personal details
- Born: Brook Francis Barrington
- Education: University of Auckland

Academic background
- Thesis: New Zealand and the search for security 1944-1954: 'a modest and moderate collaboration' (1993)
- Doctoral advisor: Nicholas Tarling

Brook Francis Barrington is a New Zealand public servant and former diplomat, who is chief executive of the Ministry of Defence and Secretary of Defence. He previously was chief executive of the Department of the Prime Minister and Cabinet and the Ministry of Foreign Affairs and Trade.

== Early life and education ==
Barrington was awarded a PhD in history from the University of Auckland in 1993. His thesis on the transformation of New Zealand's foreign policy from 1944 to 1954 was supervised by Nicholas Tarling.

Barrington's marriage to Gillian, a nurse, ended with her death in 2023.

== Career ==
Barrington began his public service career at the Ministry of Foreign Affairs and Trade (MFAT) in 1990. He had diplomatic postings in Canberra and, as deputy head of mission to the European Union, in Brussels from 1999 to 2002. He was seconded as a foreign policy, trade and defence advisor at the Department of the Prime Minister and Cabinet (DPMC) until his appointment as the Ambassador of New Zealand to Thailand, which he held from 2006 until 2009.

After leaving MFAT, Barrington held deputy chief executive positions at the Ministry of Defence and Ministry of Justice. He returned to MFAT as chief executive in 2015 and was credited with "restoring order" to the department after a "controversial" restructuring process.

State Services Commissioner Peter Hughes reassigned Barrington to the head of DPMC in 2019 as part of a series of high-profile transfers between departments.

Barrington took family leave from DPMC from March 2023 and resigned his substantive role in January 2024. He was soon after appointed for a short term as acting chief executive of MFAT. He was announced as the chief executive of the Ministry of Defence on 5 June 2024 and appointed to a five-year term.
