= Linda Te Puni =

New Zealand diplomat

Ambassador to Chile
- Incumbent
- Assumed office December 2018

Personal details
- Occupation: Diplomat

Linda Te Puni is a diplomat from New Zealand of Māori heritage. She served as the High Commissioner to the Cook Islands from 2010 until 2011 and Tuvalu beginning in 2016. She has also been Administrator of Tokelau.

== Biography ==
Te Puni is a descendant of the Te Ati Awa chief Honiana Te Puni.

Te Puni worked at several jobs before becoming a diplomat, including cutting fish in Iceland, as a farmworker in Israel and working in London pubs. Te Puni joined the Ministry of Foreign Affairs in 1987. She has served in Honiara, Samoa, Ottawa, Mexico, Paris, Suva and Wellington.

In 2010, Te Puni moved to Rarotonga as the first woman New Zealand high commissioner to the Cook Islands. Between 2015 and 2016, she was Administrator of Tokelau, the first woman to hold that role. In 2016, she was appointed as high commissioner to Tuvalu. In December 2018 she became ambassador to Chile. In 2023 she was appointed high commissioner to the Caribbean Community.
