= List of ambassadors of New Zealand to Belgium =

The Ambassador from New Zealand to Belgium is New Zealand's foremost diplomatic representative in the Kingdom of Belgium, and in charge of New Zealand's diplomatic mission in Belgium.

The embassy is located in Brussels, Belgium's capital city. New Zealand has maintained a resident ambassador in Belgium since 1967. The Ambassador to Belgium is concurrently accredited to Luxembourg, Romania, Bulgaria and Moldova.

== List of heads of mission ==
=== Consuls to Belgium ===
- Ken Piddington (1963–1964)
- Ted Farnon (1964–1965)

=== Ambassadors to Belgium ===
==== Non-resident ambassadors, resident in France ====
- Dick Hutchens (1965–1967)

==== Resident ambassadors ====
- Merwyn Norrish (1967–1973)
- Ian Stewart (1973–1977)
- Graham Ansell (1977–1981)
- John G. McArthur (1981–1983)
- Terence O'Brien (1983–1986)
- Gerry Thompson (1986–1990)
- David Gamble (1990–1994)
- Derek Leask (1994–1999)
- Dell Higgie (1999–2003)
- Wade Armstrong (2003–2007)
- Peter Kennedy (2007–2011)
- Paula Wilson (August 2012–December 2015)
- Gregory Andrews (October 2016–present)
