= List of ambassadors of New Zealand to Poland =

The Ambassador from New Zealand to Poland is New Zealand's foremost diplomatic representative in the Republic of Poland, and in charge of New Zealand's diplomatic mission in Poland.

The embassy is located in Warsaw, Poland's capital city. New Zealand has maintained a resident ambassador in Poland since 2004. The embassy was officially opened in April 2005.

== List of heads of mission ==
=== Ambassadors to Poland ===
==== Non-resident ambassadors, resident in West Germany ====
- Doug Zohrab (1973–1975)

==== Non-resident ambassadors, resident in Austria ====
- Basil Bolt (1975–1978)
- Tony Small (1978–1982)
- Hugo Judd (1982–1985)
- Don Walker (1985–1990)
- Barry Brooks (1990–1992)

==== Non-resident ambassadors, resident in Germany ====
- Richard Grant (1992–1994)
- Gerry Thompson (1994–1998)
- Win Cochrane (1998–2003)
- Peter Hamilton (2003–2004)

==== Resident ambassadors ====
- Philip Griffiths (2004–2008)
- Penelope Ridings (2008-2011)
- Wendy Hinton (2013-2016)
- Mary Thurston (2016–2021)
- Alana Rose Hudson (2021–2024)

== See also ==
- New Zealand–Poland relations
