= List of ambassadors of New Zealand to Turkey =

The Ambassador from New Zealand to Turkey is New Zealand's foremost diplomatic representative in the Republic of Turkey, and in charge of New Zealand's diplomatic mission in Turkey.

The embassy is located in Ankara, Turkey's capital city. New Zealand has maintained a resident ambassador in Turkey since 1993. The Ambassador to Turkey is concurrently accredited to Israel and Jordan.

== List of heads of mission ==
=== Non-resident ambassadors, resident in Iran ===
- John Wood (1989–1990)
- Laurie Markes (1990–1993)

=== Resident ambassadors ===
- Clive Pearson (1993–1996)
- Ian Kennedy (1996–1999)
- Alan Cook (1999–2003)
- Jan Henderson (2003–2006)
- Hamish Cooper (2006-2009)
- Andrea Smith (2009-2011)
- Taha Macpherson (2011-2014)
- Jonathan Curr (2014-2018)
- Wendy Hinton (2018–2021)
- Zoe Coulson-Sinclair (2021–2024)
- Greg Lewis (2025-present)
