= List of ambassadors of New Zealand to Spain =

The Ambassador from New Zealand to Spain is New Zealand's foremost diplomatic representative in the Kingdom of Spain, and in charge of New Zealand's diplomatic mission in Spain.

The embassy is located in Madrid, Spain's capital city. New Zealand has maintained a resident ambassador in Spain since 1992. The Ambassador to Spain is concurrently accredited to Morocco.

== List of heads of mission ==
=== Ambassadors to Spain ===
==== Non-resident ambassadors, resident in France ====
- John G. McArthur (1977–1979)
- John Scott (1979–1984)
- John G. McArthur (1984–1987)

==== Non-resident ambassadors, resident in Italy ====
- Tony Small (1987–1990)
- Peter Bennett (1990–1992)

==== Resident ambassadors ====
- Paul Tipping (1992–1996)
- Wilbur Dovey (1996–2000)
- Christine Bogle (2000–2005)
- Geoff Ward (2005-2008)
- Rob Moore-Jones (2008-2012)
- Michael Swain (2012-2016)
- Andrew Jenks (2016-2018)
- Nigel Fyfe (2018–2022)
- Tara Morton (2023–)

== See also ==
- New Zealand–Spain relations
