= List of ambassadors of New Zealand to Brazil =

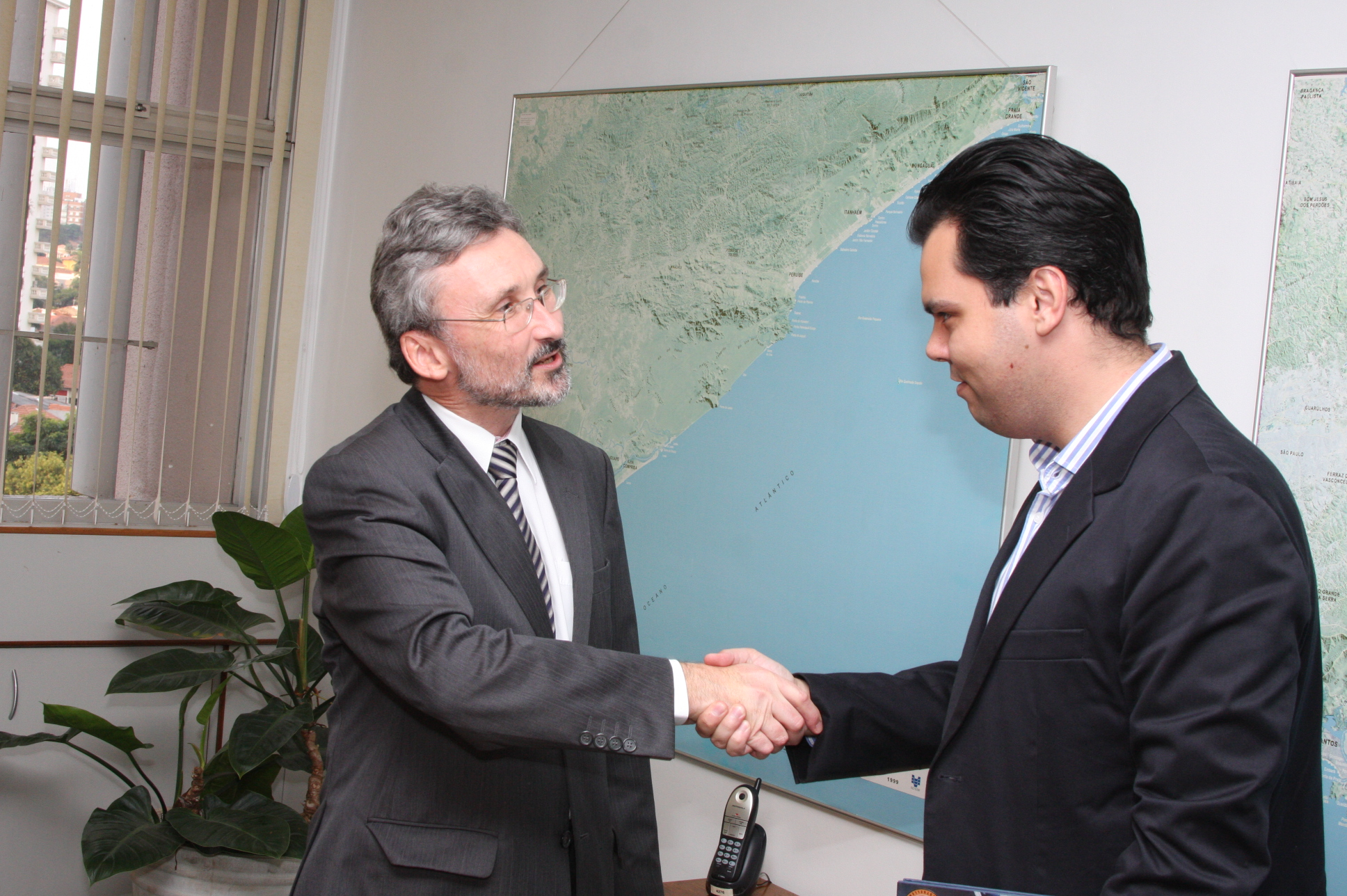
Ambassador Trainor (left) meets an official in 2011

The Ambassador from New Zealand to Brazil is New Zealand's foremost diplomatic representative in the Federative Republic of Brazil, and in charge of New Zealand's diplomatic mission in Brazil.

The embassy is located in Brasília, Brazil's capital city. New Zealand has maintained a resident ambassador in Brazil since 2001.

== List of heads of mission ==
=== Ambassadors to Brazil ===
==== Non-resident ambassadors, resident in Chile ====
- David Holborow (1978–1981)
- Ian Landon-Lane (1981–1985)
- Barry Brooks (1985–1988)
- Paul Tipping (1988–1992)
- Frank Wilson (1992–1996)
- David McKee (1996–1998)

==== Non-resident ambassadors, resident in Argentina ====
- Caroline Forsyth (1998–2001)

==== Resident ambassadors ====
- Denise Almao (2001–2006)
- Alison Mann (2006–2008)
- Mark Trainor (2008–2011)
- Jeffrey McAlister (2011–2015)
- Caroline Bilkey (2015–2018)
- Chris Langley (2018–2021)
- Richard Prendergast (2022-)

== See also ==
- Brazil–New Zealand relations
