= New Zealand–European Union relations =

- European Union: New Zealand

New Zealand and the European Union (EU) have solid relations and increasingly see eye-to-eye on international issues. EU–New Zealand relations are founded on a Joint Declaration on Relations and Cooperation, first agreed in 2007. It covers not just economic relations, but broader political issues and cooperation.

The New Zealand Government maintains a delegation to the EU at its embassy in Brussels. A Delegation of the European Union is located in Wellington.

== History ==
The first political statement of cooperation between the EU and New Zealand dates back to 1999, with the signing of the Joint Declaration on Relations between the European Union and New Zealand.

This has been replaced in 2007 by the Joint Declaration on Relations and Cooperation, an updated political declaration which governs and directs the activity between the two partners. The Declaration sets out a detailed action programme for the EU and New Zealand in such areas as global and regional security, counter-terrorism and human rights, development and economic cooperation, trade, climate change as well as science and technology.

The EU and New Zealand have also negotiated a number of sectoral agreements designed to facilitate access to each other's markets and reduce exporters’ costs. Notable examples include agreements on veterinary standards, horizontal air transport services, and on mutual recognition of standards and certification. Senior officials' consultations on trade, agriculture, fisheries, and science & technology take place every year alternating between Brussels and Wellington. Consultations and information exchanges also take place in areas such as climate change, development assistance, and humanitarian aid.

In October 2015, during Prime Minister John Key's visit to Brussels, European Union Council President of the Council of the European Union President Donald Tusk and European Commission President Jean-Claude Juncker announced with Prime Minister Key the launching of a process towards an EU-New Zealand Free Trade Agreement. Work is currently underway to prepare the negotiations.

Since July 2012, New Zealand and the EU have been in negotiations for a first legally binding overarching political treaty, governing their overall relationship. Negotiations of this treaty—the Partnership Agreement on Relations and Cooperation (PARC)—have been concluded and the text was initialed in March 2015. The formal signing of the document took place on 5 October 2016 and was signed by the High Representative of the Union for Foreign Affairs and Security Policy / Vice-president of the European Commission, Federica Mogherini, and then New Zealand Minister of Foreign Affairs, Hon Murray McCully.

In January 2023, the EU ambassador to New Zealand, Nina Obermaier, expressed in an interview with Radio New Zealand that New Zealand could be part of the Eurovision Song Contest should enough domestic interest be shown. This would involve New Zealand becoming an associate member of the European Broadcasting Union and requesting to field their own participants.

== Trade ==
The EU is New Zealand's third-largest trading partner, after China and Australia, and New Zealand is the EU's 50th. New Zealand's exports are dominated by agricultural goods, while the EU's exports is dominated by manufactured goods. The stock of EU foreign direct investment in New Zealand is €10.9bn and the stock of New Zealand's investment in the EU is €5.6bn.

EU–New Zealand trade
Direction of trade	Goods	Services
EU to New Zealand	€5.3 billion (2017) €4.7 billion (2016) €4.6 billion (2015)	€2.7 billion (2016) €2.6 billion (2015) €2.3 billion (2014)
New Zealand to EU	€3.4 billion (2017) €3.4 billion (2016) €3.5 billion (2015)	€1.7 billion (2016) €1.7 billion (2015) €1.4 billion (2014)

=== EU-NZ free trade agreement ===
On 29 October 2015, New Zealand and the European Union concluded a Partnership Agreement on Relations and Cooperation to begin work on developing a free trade agreement. In February 2016, the European Parliament adopted a resolution on initiating free trade negotiations with both New Zealand and Australia. In April 2018, New Zealand Prime Minister Jacinda Ardern lobbied for a free trade agreement with the European Union and received the backing of French President Emmanuel Macron.

On 1 July 2022, both parties concluded negotiations for a free trade agreement. Under the terms of the agreement, all tariffs on European Union exports to New Zealand including agricultural and food products would be lifted. In return, duties would be lifted on 97% of New Zealand exports to the European Union; with over 91% being removed on the day that the free trade agreement comes into effect. In addition, tariffs were eliminated for most New Zealand horticultural products (including kiwifruits, wine, onions, apples, mānuka honey), all manufactured goods, and most seafood products. The free trade agreement would then be submitted to the European Commission, Council of the European Union, and European Parliament for approval. While New Zealand cheese producers would be able to continue using the names gouda, mozzarella, haloumi, brie and camembert for their products, the use of the name feta would be limited to Greek producers. As a result, New Zealand feta manufacturers would have to find a new name within nine years.

On 9 July 2023, Prime Minister Chris Hipkins and President of the European Commission Ursula von der Leyen formally signed the New Zealand-European Union free trade agreement in Brussels. While the FTA still awaited ratification by the European Parliament, farmers and some political groups in the European Parliament opposed the free trade agreement, however, European Union Ambassador to New Zealand Nina Obermaier confirmed that the 27 EU member states had consented to the FTA.

On 23 November 2023, the European Parliament voted to ratify the NZ-EU free trade agreement by a majority of 524 votes. Trade Minister Damien O'Connor welcomed the ratification of the free trade agreement as "an important step towards the agreement entering into force."

On 1 May 2024, the NZ-EU free trade agreement came into force, lifting 91% of tariffs on New Zealand exports to the European Union. This will rise to 97% after seven years.

On 30 September 2026, the Dutch environmentalist group Both ENDS filed a complaint against New Zealand through the European Commission's "Single Entry Point" mechanism for allegedly breaching the climate change provisions of the EU–NZ free trade agreement. Both ENDs contended that the National-led coalition government had breached these provisions by lacking a credible plan to meet climate targets, weakened methane targets, removed agriculture from carbon pricing, overturned the gas and oil exploration ban, invested in gas and a planned LNG facility, and passed legislation preventing climate-related lawsuits against major emitters. The group's complaint was supported by several New Zealand groups and individuals including Greenpeace New Zealand, the Environmental Law Initiative, Mike Smith and University of Auckland law Professor Jane Kelsey. In response, NZ Trade Minister Todd McClay defended the New Zealand government's climate change policies, saying it was "not for overseas countries, organisations or lobby groups to tell New Zealand how to meet its obligations". Similarly, NZ Prime Minister Christopher Luxon contended that New Zealand was complying with its international and trade obligations.

== New Zealand's foreign relations with EU member states ==
- Austria
- Belgium
- Bulgaria
- Croatia
- Cyprus
- Czech Republic
- Denmark
- Estonia
- Finland
- France
- Germany
- Greece
- Hungary
- (Republic of Ireland) Ireland
- Italy
- Latvia
- Lithuania
- Luxembourg
- Malta
- Netherlands
- Poland
- Portugal
- Romania
- Slovakia
- Slovenia
- Spain
- Sweden

== See also ==
- Foreign relations of New Zealand
- Foreign relations of the European Union
- Australia–European Union relations
