= Foreign relations of New Zealand =

The foreign relations of New Zealand are oriented chiefly toward developed democratic nations and emerging Pacific Island economies. Until the late 20th century, New Zealand aligned itself strongly with the United Kingdom (as a former British colony) and had few bilateral relationships with other countries. From the later half of the 20th century, Australia has been New Zealand's most important cultural, economic and military partner. Today, the country participates in several multilateral political organisations, including Asia-Pacific Economic Cooperation, the Pacific Community, and the Pacific Islands Forum. New Zealand has been described as an emerging power; however, such a claim needs to be considered in the context of its medium-sized economy and limited military capability. The country's major political parties have generally agreed on the broad outlines of foreign policy, and the government has been active in promoting free trade, nuclear disarmament, and arms control.

In summer 2013, New Zealand Foreign Minister Murray McCully reported that:

All New Zealand's important relationships are in good repair....With the United States there are hopes of a major breakthrough in terms of trade relations. Sino – New Zealand relations are also subdued, but trade is burgeoning. Japan's decision to join the Trans-Pacific Partnership is a welcome change and New Zealand continues to pursue a free trade agreement with South Korea. The government is pressing ahead with plans to strengthen relations in a number of other areas, including Russia, South Asia, Latin America, the Persian Gulf and especially the South Pacific. It is also alive to the potential benefits of closer ties with countries on the African continent.

== History ==
=== British Dominion ===
After World War One, New Zealand signed the Treaty of Versailles (1919) and joined the League of Nations. Wellington trusted Conservative Party governments in London, but not Labour. When the British Labour Party took power in 1924 and 1929, the New Zealand government felt threatened by Labour's foreign policy because of its reliance upon the League of Nations. The League was distrusted and Wellington did not expect to see the coming of a peaceful world order under League auspices. What had been the Empire's most loyal Dominion became a dissenter as it opposed efforts the first and second British Labour governments to trust the League's framework of arbitration and collective security agreements.

The governments of the Reform and United Parties between 1912 and 1935 followed a "realistic" foreign policy. They made national security a high priority, were sceptical of international institutions such as the League, and showed no interest on the questions of self-determination, democracy, and human rights. However the opposition Labour Party was more idealistic and proposed a liberal internationalist outlook on international affairs. From 1935 the First Labour Government showed a limited degree of idealism in foreign policy, for example opposing the appeasement of Nazi Germany and Japan.

=== Second World War ===
When World War II broke out in 1939, New Zealand whole-heartedly joined in the defence of Britain, with Prime Minister Michael Joseph Savage declaring that "where Britain goes, we go; where Britain stands, we stand". New Zealand soldiers served in North Africa, Italy and the Pacific, and airmen in England and the Pacific, throughout the war, even when New Zealand had concerns about invasion by the Japanese.

=== Since 1945 ===
During World War II the New Zealand government created a Department of External Affairs (now the Ministry of Foreign Affairs and Trade) for the first time in 1943, taking control of foreign policy that had previously been run by the Dominions Office in London. In 1947 New Zealand ratified the 1931 Statute of Westminster with the Statute of Westminster Adoption Act 1947, which made New Zealand fully independent of Britain.

The Fall of Singapore during World War II made New Zealand realise that she could no longer rely on Britain to defend the British Empire. New Zealand troops supported the British in the successful battle against Communist insurrection in Malaysia and maintained an air-force fighter squadron in Singapore, and later on Cyprus, again supporting British forces. New Zealand diplomats sought an alliance with the United States of America, and in 1951 adhered to the ANZUS Treaty between New Zealand, Australia and the US. In return for America's guarantee of protection, New Zealand felt obliged to support America in its wars, and New Zealand committed forces to the Korean War (1950–1953) under United Nations Command auspices and to the Vietnam War. By the 1970s, many New Zealanders began to feel uncomfortable with their country's support for the US, particularly in Vietnam and regarding the visits of nuclear-powered and armed United States Armed Forces warships. The Third Labour government (1972–1975) pulled New Zealand troops out of the Vietnam War and protested against French nuclear testing in the Pacific, at one stage sending a warship to act as disapproving witness to the tests.

Britain's entry into the European Economic Community in 1973 forced New Zealand into a more independent role. The British move restricted New Zealand's trade access to its biggest market, and it sought new trading partners in Asia, America and the Middle East. Australia and New Zealand signed the free-trade Closer Economic Relations agreement in 1983. The election of the Fourth Labour Government in 1984 marked a new period of independent foreign policy. Nuclear-powered and nuclear-armed ships were banned from New Zealand waters, effectively removing New Zealand from the ANZUS pact. Immigration laws were liberalised, leading to a massive increase in immigration from Asia. The Fourth National Government (1990–1999) liberalised trade by removing most tariffs and import restrictions.

In 2008, Minister of Foreign Affairs Winston Peters announced what he called "a seismic change for New Zealand's foreign service", designed to remedy the country's "struggling to maintain an adequate presence on the international stage". Peters said that the Ministry would receive additional funding and increase the number of New Zealand diplomats serving abroad by 50%.

== Participation in international organisations ==
New Zealand participates in the United Nations (UN); the World Trade Organization (WTO); World Bank; the International Monetary Fund (IMF); the Organisation for Economic Co-operation and Development (OECD); the International Energy Agency; the Asian Development Bank; the Pacific Islands Forum; the Secretariat of the Pacific Community; the Colombo Plan; Asia-Pacific Economic Cooperation (APEC); and the International Whaling Commission. New Zealand also actively participates as a member of the Commonwealth. Despite the 1985 rupture in the ANZUS military alliance, New Zealand has maintained good working relations with the United States and Australia on a broad array of international issues.

In the past, New Zealand's geographic isolation and its agricultural economy's general prosperity minimised public interest in international affairs. However, growing global trade and other international economic events have made New Zealanders increasingly aware of their country's dependence on unstable overseas markets. New Zealand governments strongly advocate free trade, especially in agricultural products, and the country belongs to the Cairns group of nations in the WTO.

New Zealand's economic involvement with Asia has become increasingly important. New Zealand is a "dialogue partner" with the Association of Southeast Asian Nations (ASEAN), a member of the East Asia Summit and an active participant in APEC.

As a charter member of the Colombo Plan, New Zealand has provided Asian countries with technical assistance and capital. It also contributes through the Asian Development Bank and through UN programs and is a member of the UN Economic and Social Council for Asia and the Pacific.

=== Summary of international organisation participation ===
ABEDA, ANZUS (U.S. suspended security obligations to NZ on 11 August 1986), APEC, ARF (dialogue partner), AsDB, ASEAN (dialogue partner), Australia Group, Commonwealth, CP, EBRD, ESCAP, FAO, IAEA, IBRD, ICAO, ICC, ICCt, ICFTU, ICRM, IDA, IEA, IFAD, IFC, IFRCS, IHO, ILO, IMF, IMO, Interpol, IOC, IOM, ISO, ITU, NAM (guest), NSG, OECD, OPCW, PCA, PIF, Sparteca, SPC, UN, UNAMSIL, UNCTAD, UNESCO, UNHCR, UNIDO, UNMIK, UNMISET, UNMOP, UNTSO, UPU, WCO, WFTU, WHO, WIPO, WMO, WTO

=== United Nations ===
New Zealand was a founding member of the United Nations in 1945, and was in the first set of rotating non-permanent members of the United Nations Security Council.

=== Commonwealth of Nations ===
New Zealand is a member state of the Commonwealth of Nations.

== Trade ==
McGraw argues that, "Probably the greatest foreign policy achievement of [Helen] Clark's [1999–2008] term was the conclusion of a free trade agreement with China." Clark's government also set up a free-trade deal with Australia and the ten nations of ASEAN (the Association of South East Asian Nations).

New Zealand has existing free trade agreements with Australia, Brunei, Chile, the People's Republic of China, Hong Kong, Singapore, Thailand, United Kingdom; new free trade agreements are under negotiation with ASEAN, and Malaysia. New Zealand is involved in the WTO's Doha Development Agenda and was disappointed by the failure of the most recent talks in July 2006.

During 2017 to 2020, the Labour-NZ First coalition government committed to initiate a Closer Commonwealth Economic Relations (CCER) agreement with the UK, Australia, Canada and other countries and to work towards a Free Trade Agreement with the Russia-Belarus-Kazakhstan Customs Union. A free trade agreement with the European Union was signed in July 2023 and went live in May 2024. Trade deals with the Gulf Cooperation Council were signed in 2024.

New Zealand's main export is food, primarily dairy products, meat, fruit and fish; about 95% of the country's agricultural produce is exported. Other major exports are wood, and mechanical and electrical equipment. About 46% of exports are non-agricultural, but the largest industry is still the food industry. Tourism is also an extremely important component of international trade: transport and travel form around 20% of the country's export trade. New Zealand does not have large quantities of mineral resources, though it does produce some coal, oil, aluminium and natural gas.

New Zealand's largest source of imports is China, followed by (in order) Australia, the United States, Japan, and Singapore. The largest destinations for exports are, in order, Australia, China, the U.S., Japan, and South Korea. Trade figures for 2011 with New Zealand's biggest trade partners are as follows:

2011 merchandise imports and exports (millions of NZ dollars)
Country	Imports	Exports	Country	Imports	Exports
Australia	7,377	10,858	Saudi Arabia	918	691
China	7,439	5,887	Singapore	2,163	812
Germany	1,993	775	South Korea	1,453	1,674
Japan	2,921	3,439	Thailand	1,330	731
Malaysia	1,478	874	United Kingdom	1,267	1,544
Qatar	1,041	2	United States	5,025	3,997
Russia	1,204	280	Total (world)	46,857	47,710

== Military ==
The New Zealand Defence Force is small compared to many other countries and it lacks air combat capability. Its overseas duties consist mostly of peacekeeping, especially in the Pacific, with wider regional security falling to Australia. In the 21st century, peacekeeping detachments have been deployed to East Timor, the Solomon Islands, and Tonga. Engineering and support forces have also been involved in the Iraq War.

In February 2021 the MFAT confirmed granting export permits for military equipment to be sold to the Armed Forces of Saudi Arabia in the years 2016 and 2018, respectively. Documents obtained under the Official Information Act showed detailed transactions of the military export. The revelation was followed by a previous revelation of the business unit of Air New Zealand aiding the Royal Saudi Navy on a contractual basis, breaching its obligations towards human rights. The case of Air New Zealand's business unit The Gas Turbines aiding Royal Saudi navy was commissioned in early April 2021 by the Ministry of Foreign Affairs and Trade to be reviewed by a former executive of Ministry of Business, Innovation and Employment. The contractual arrangement between the two was criticised following the Arab nation's role in the Yemen war. It was reported that the UN had expressed concerns regarding any military exports made to Saudi could possibly be used in the Yemeni conflict, despite which the MFAT sanctioned exports to the country, inviting scrutiny over New Zealand's relations with Saudi Arabia.

== Foreign aid ==
New Zealand's official aid programme is managed by the New Zealand Agency for International Development (NZAID), a semi-autonomous body within the Ministry of Foreign Affairs and Trade. In 2007, New Zealand was the sixth lowest foreign aid donor in the Organisation for Economic Co-operation and Development (OECD), based on proportion of gross national income (GNI) spent on overseas development assistance. New Zealand's contribution was 0.27% of GNI. Much this went to the Pacific region. However, the country is occasionally more generous in responding to major crises, for example donating around $100 million to the 2004 Indian Ocean tsunami relief efforts, the committed $1 million to the 2010 Haiti earthquake relief efforts, and later the government donated $2 million to the 2011 Japan earthquake and tsunami relief efforts. Following the April and May 2015 Nepal earthquake, the New Zealand Government sent an initial $1 million in humanitarian aid, and has mobilised 45 urban search and rescue technicians. New Zealand troops and aircraft are also often sent to disaster areas in the Asia-Pacific region.

== Nuclear free policy ==
In the 1970s and 1980s, anti-nuclear sentiment increased across New Zealand fuelling concerns about French nuclear testing in the Pacific at Moruroa atoll. The third Labour Government under Norman Kirk, co-sponsored by Australia, took France before the International Court of Justice in 1972, requesting that the French cease atmospheric nuclear testing at Mururoa Atoll in French Polynesia in the southern Pacific Ocean. In 1972, as an act of defiance and protest the Kirk government sent two of its navy frigates, HMNZS Canterbury and Otago into the Moruroa test zone area. Peace yachts attempting to disrupt the French tests had been sailing in coordinated protests into the Mururoa exclusion zones between 1972 and 1991. Concerns about Nuclear proliferation and the presence of nuclear warheads or reactors on United States Navy ships visiting New Zealand ports continued to escalate. After it was elected in 1984, the Labour Party government of David Lange indicated its opposition to visits by such ships. In February 1985, New Zealand turned away the USS Buchanan and in response the United States announced that it was suspending its treaty obligations to New Zealand unless port access was restored. In 1987 the Labour government strengthened its stance by declaring New Zealand a nuclear-free zone (New Zealand Nuclear Free Zone, Disarmament, and Arms Control Act 1987), effectively legally removing New Zealand from the nuclear deterrent scenario and banning the entry of nuclear powered warships into its ports. Warships that did not fall into this category were not blocked, but the US took the view that any subsequent visit by a warship to New Zealand could not be carried out without violating the US' security policy of "neither confirming nor denying" nuclear capability of its ships.

In 1987, New Zealand passed legislation making the country a nuclear free zone, namely the New Zealand Nuclear Free Zone, Disarmament, and Arms Control Act; in the same year the US retaliated with the Broomfield Act, designating New Zealand as a "friend" rather than an "ally".

In recent years, some voices have suggested removing the anti-nuclear legislation, especially the ACT New Zealand political party; and up until February 2006 the National Party was in favour of holding a referendum on the issue. However, public opinion remains strongly in favour of the country's status as a nuclear free zone. In May 2006, US Assistant Secretary of State for East Asia and Pacific Affairs, Christopher Hill, described the disagreement between the US and New Zealand as "a relic" but also signalled that the US wanted a closer defence relationship with New Zealand and praised New Zealand's involvement in Afghanistan and reconstruction in Iraq. "Rather than trying to change each other's minds on the nuclear issue, which is a bit of a relic, I think we should focus on things we can make work," he told the Australian Financial Review. Pressure from the United States on New Zealand's foreign policy increased in 2006, with U.S. trade officials linking the repeal of the ban of American nuclear ships from New Zealand's ports to a potential free trade agreement between the two countries.

Relations between France and New Zealand were strained for two short periods in the 1980s and 1990s over the French nuclear tests at Moruroa and the bombing of the Rainbow Warrior in Waitematā harbour, Auckland. The latter was widely regarded as an act of state terrorism against New Zealand's sovereignty and was ordered by then French President François Mitterrand, although he denied any involvement at the time. These events worked to strengthen New Zealand's resolve to retain its anti-nuclear policy. Relations between the two countries are now cordial, with strong trade and many new bilateral links.

In 2017, New Zealand signed the United Nations Treaty on the Prohibition of Nuclear Weapons. Foreign Affairs Minister Gerry Brownlee said the treaty is "consistent with New Zealand's long-standing commitment to international nuclear disarmament efforts".

== Relations by region ==
=== Latin America ===
New Zealand has well-established links to a number of Latin American countries, particularly in the economic sphere. New Zealand has Embassies in Mexico City, Santiago, Brasília and Buenos Aires – the first of which (Santiago) opened in 1972. The New Zealand Government's Latin America Strategy, published in May 2010, estimates New Zealand's annual exports to the region at NZ$1 billion, and New Zealand investments in the region (in areas such as agri-technology, energy, fisheries, and specialised manufacturing) at around NZ$1.3 billion. The Strategy argues that there is considerable scope to expand New Zealand's investment and services trade in the region. Focusing on six countries (Brazil, Mexico, Chile, Argentina, Uruguay and Peru), the Strategy posits that New Zealand should be seeking to: promote a better understanding of the region among New Zealand businesses to help identify prospects for increased investment, trade and joint ventures; lower barriers to business between New Zealand and Latin America; promote New Zealand tourism in the region; improve airlinks between New Zealand and the region; deepen education and research and science links. There are significant flows of tourists and students from Latin America to New Zealand. For example, in the year to June 2010, around 30,000 Latin Americans visited New Zealand. In addition, New Zealand has popular Working Holiday Schemes with Brazil, Argentina, Chile, Peru, Mexico and Uruguay.

=== Pacific relations ===
New Zealand High Commission in Nukuʻalofa, Tonga.

Much of New Zealand's foreign policy is focused on the Pacific region, particularly Polynesia and Melanesia. Bilateral economic assistance resources have been focused on projects in the South Pacific island states, especially on Bougainville. The country's long association with Samoa (formerly known as Western Samoa), reflected in a treaty of friendship signed in 1962, and its close association with Tonga have resulted in a flow of immigrants and visitors under work permit schemes from both countries. Recently New Zealand forces participated in peacekeeping efforts in the Pacific region in East Timor, the Solomon Islands and Tonga, see Military history of New Zealand.

In 1947, New Zealand joined Australia, France, the United Kingdom, and the United States to form the South Pacific Commission, a regional body to promote the welfare of the Pacific region. New Zealand has been a leader in the organisation. In 1971, New Zealand joined the other independent and self-governing states of the South Pacific to establish the South Pacific Forum (now known as the Pacific Islands Forum), which meets annually at the "heads of government" level.

On 26 May 2006, New Zealand deployed forty-two troops, with a second contingent of 120 troops leaving Christchurch on 27 May, to Townsville, Queensland, before being sent to participate in the 2006 East Timorese crisis. Clark said the forces would be deployed where needed by the Australian command.

== Diplomatic relations ==
List of countries which New Zealand maintains diplomatic relations with:

#	Country	Date
1	United Kingdom	June 1905
2	Canada	11 September 1939
3	United States	16 February 1942
4	Australia	27 February 1943
5	Russia	13 April 1944
6	France	13 July 1945
7	Chile	27 December 1945
8	Netherlands	19 June 1947
9	Denmark	12 September 1947
10	Belgium	27 November 1947
11	Sweden	9 July 1949
12	Finland	22 July 1950
13	Italy	22 August 1950
14	Israel	17 January 1951
15	Philippines	18 January 1951
16	Pakistan	18 April 1951
17	Serbia	September 1951
18	India	7 April 1952
19	Japan	28 April 1952
20	Germany	10 November 1953
21	Greece	22 September 1955
22	Sri Lanka	14 December 1955
23	Thailand	26 March 1956
24	Austria	23 October 1956
25	Malaysia	25 September 1957
26	Indonesia	28 June 1958
27	Myanmar	15 November 1958
28	Cambodia	18 February 1959
29	Czech Republic	5 September 1959
30	Nepal	26 May 1961
31	Samoa	1 January 1962
32	South Korea	26 March 1962
33	Uruguay	27 September 1962
34	Switzerland	4 December 1962
35	Laos	7 February 1963
36	Brazil	13 October 1964
37	Singapore	22 November 1965
38	Ireland	19 January 1966
39	Mauritius	28 April 1968
40	Spain	28 March 1969
41	Argentina	10 July 1969
42	Norway	10 October 1969
43	Romania	13 October 1969
44	Egypt	13 February 1970
45	Tonga	4 June 1970
46	Fiji	10 October 1970
47	Luxembourg	3 December 1970
48	Bangladesh	4 July 1972
49	Peru	1 August 1972
50	China	22 December 1972
51	Poland	1 March 1973
—	Holy See	20 June 1973
52	Mexico	19 July 1973
53	Malta	23 November 1973
54	Iran	14 December 1973
55	Albania	1973
56	Hungary	30 March 1974
57	Nauru	24 July 1974
58	Jamaica	27 August 1974
59	Barbados	28 August 1974
60	Guyana	1 September 1974
61	Trinidad and Tobago	9 October 1974
62	Maldives	10 October 1974
63	Mongolia	8 April 1975
64	Vietnam	19 June 1975
65	Papua New Guinea	16 September 1975
66	Iraq	6 November 1975
67	Portugal	22 June 1976
68	Saudi Arabia	22 December 1976
69	Colombia	1 May 1978
70	Cyprus	9 May 1978
71	Solomon Islands	7 July 1978
72	Ecuador	25 September 1978
73	Tuvalu	1 October 1978
74	Turkey	12 December 1978
75	Lesotho	1978
76	Kiribati	29 April 1980
77	Vanuatu	30 July 1980
78	Lebanon	25 November 1980
79	Venezuela	4 December 1980
80	Tanzania	7 December 1981
81	Nigeria	16 April 1982
82	Kenya	9 June 1982
83	Mali	6 March 1983
84	Libya	4 May 1983
85	Brunei	5 May 1984
86	Bahrain	23 July 1984
87	Bulgaria	9 October 1984
88	Qatar	10 November 1984
89	Zimbabwe	15 February 1985
90	Zambia	2 April 1985
91	United Arab Emirates	20 May 1985
92	Oman	6 September 1985
93	Algeria	29 October 1985
94	Kuwait	1985
95	Botswana	1987
96	Jordan	25 October 1987
97	Honduras	February 1988
98	Marshall Islands	17 June 1988
99	Federated States of Micronesia	30 June 1988
100	Costa Rica	5 July 1988
101	Nicaragua	30 August 1988
102	Iceland	21 October 1988
103	Mozambique	6 June 1990
104	Namibia	23 January 1991
105	Latvia	19 December 1991
106	Estonia	6 January 1992
107	Lithuania	10 January 1992
108	Croatia	25 February 1992
109	Ukraine	3 March 1992
110	Georgia	11 March 1992
111	Uzbekistan	11 March 1992
112	Slovenia	20 March 1992
113	Belarus	9 April 1992
114	Kazakhstan	12 May 1992
115	Armenia	6 June 1992
116	Azerbaijan	29 June 1992
117	Kyrgyzstan	7 September 1992
118	Turkmenistan	8 September 1992
119	Moldova	11 September 1992
120	Bosnia and Herzegovina	17 November 1992
121	Seychelles	1992
122	Slovakia	1 January 1993
123	Paraguay	17 February 1993
124	Panama	22 March 1993
125	North Macedonia	8 April 1993
—	Niue	2 August 1993
—	Cook Islands	1993
126	South Africa	19 January 1994
127	Palau	2 December 1994
128	Morocco	1994
129	Andorra	3 August 1995
130	Guatemala	27 October 1998
131	Bolivia	29 October 1998
132	Cuba	17 February 1999
133	Ghana	23 June 1999
134	Eritrea	2 December 1999
135	Eswatini	2000
136	North Korea	26 March 2001
137	El Salvador	12 November 2001
138	Timor-Leste	20 May 2002
139	Afghanistan	7 May 2003
140	Montenegro	17 July 2006
141	Uganda	1 November 2006
142	Syria	5 December 2006
143	Sierra Leone	5 March 2009
—	Kosovo	9 November 2009
144	Ethiopia	6 December 2011
145	Rwanda	17 April 2012
146	Senegal	17 April 2012
147	Tunisia	11 July 2012
148	Malawi	20 March 2013
149	Tajikistan	5 April 2013
150	Saint Lucia	17 May 2013
151	Benin	27 June 2013
152	Saint Kitts and Nevis	20 September 2013
153	Grenada	September 2013
154	Angola	4 October 2013
155	San Marino	20 October 2013
156	Liechtenstein	30 October 2013
157	Suriname	25 March 2014
158	Dominica	26 March 2014
159	Burundi	16 May 2014
160	Dominican Republic	26 June 2014
161	Saint Vincent and the Grenadines	14 August 2014
162	Liberia	26 August 2014
163	Haiti	4 September 2014
164	Antigua and Barbuda	6 October 2014
165	Mauritania	2 September 2015
166	Monaco	22 October 2015
167	Guinea	20 April 2016
168	Djibouti	1 October 2016
169	Central African Republic	27 October 2016
170	Burkina Faso	19 April 2017
171	Yemen	2 May 2018
172	Belize	18 March 2019
173	Bahamas	27 June 2019
174	Madagascar	17 September 2025
175	Cameroon	Unknown
176	Ivory Coast	Unknown
177	Niger	Unknown

== Bilateral relations ==
=== Africa ===
Country	Formal Relations Began	Notes
Egypt	1 November 1969	See Egypt–New Zealand relations: Egypt has an embassy in Wellington.; New Zealand has an embassy in Cairo.
Mali	6 March 1983	Both countries established diplomatic relations on 6 March 1983 when first Mali Ambassador to New Zealand (resident in Peking), Mr. Boubacar Toure presented his credentials to the Governor-General
Nigeria	16 April 1982	Both countries established diplomatic relations on 16 April 1982 when the first Nigerian High Commissioner in Canberra, Mr. Edward Sanu presented his credentials to Governal General of New Zealand: New Zealand is accredited to Nigeria from its embassy in Addis Ababa, Ethiopia.; Nigeria is accredited to New Zealand from its high commission in Canberra, Australia.
South Africa	19 January 1994	See New Zealand–South Africa relations: New Zealand has a high commission in Pretoria.; South Africa has a high commission in Wellington.
Zambia	2 April 1985	New Zealand is accredited to Zambia from its high commission in Pretoria, South Africa.; Zambia is accredited to New Zealand from its high commission in Canberra, Australia.; Both countries are full members of Commonwealth of Nations.

=== Americas ===
Country	Formal relations began	Notes
Argentina	10 July 1969	See Argentina–New Zealand relations: Diplomatic relations were cut off during the Falklands War, but they were re-established on 20 August 1984.; Argentina has an embassy in Wellington.; New Zealand has an embassy in Buenos Aires.; Both countries are members of the Cairns Group.; List of treaties governing the relations between Argentina and New Zealand (Argentine Foreign Ministry, in Spanish); New Zealand Ministry of Foreign Affairs and Trade about relations with Argentina
Barbados	28 August 1974	Barbados is accredited to New Zealand from its High Commission in Ottawa, Canada; New Zealand is accredited to Barbados from its Ministry of Foreign Affairs based in Wellington.; New Zealand has a High Commission in Bridgetown.
Belize		Belize does not have an accreditation to New Zealand.; New Zealand is accredited to Belize from its embassy in Mexico City, Mexico.
Brazil	1964	See Brazil–New Zealand relations: Brazil has an embassy in Wellington.; New Zealand has an embassy in Brasília and a consulate-general in São Paulo.
Canada	11 September 1939	See Canada–New Zealand relations New Zealand and Canada have a close and longstanding relationship that has been fostered by the two countries' similar history and culture, extremely close ties to the Commonwealth of Nations and extensive links to people in either country. New Zealand and Canada have a common Head of State, King Charles III. Canada has said that New Zealand is a valuable international partner despite the thousands of miles separating the two countries. Both share a like-minded view of the world on a variety of issues. New Zealand and Canada have close links whether it be through business or trade relations, the United Nations, the Commonwealth or mutual treaty agreements, New Zealand-Canada relations are extremely important to both countries.: Canada has a High Commission in Wellington.; New Zealand has a High Commission in Ottawa and a consulate-general in Vancouver.
Chile	1948	See Chile–New Zealand relations: Chile has an embassy in Wellington.; New Zealand has an embassy in Santiago.
Colombia	1 May 1978	See Colombia–New Zealand relations: Colombia is accredited to New Zealand from its embassy in Canberra, Australia and maintains a consulate-general in Auckland.; New Zealand has an embassy in Bogotá.
Dominica	26 March 2014	New Zealand is represented in Dominica by its embassy in Bridgetown, Barbados.; Both countries are full members of the Commonwealth of Nations.
Grenada		New Zealand is represented in Grenada by its embassy in Bridgetown, Barbados.; Both countries are full members of the Commonwealth of Nations.
Mexico	19 July 1973	See Mexico–New Zealand relations: Mexico has an embassy in Wellington.; New Zealand has an embassy in Mexico City.; Both nations are members of APEC and the OECD.
Peru	1 August 1972	See New Zealand–Peru relations: New Zealand is accredited to Peru from its embassy in Santiago, Chile and maintains an honorary consulate in Lima.; Peru has an embassy in Wellington.
Saint Vincent and the Grenadines	14 August 2014	New Zealand is represented in Saint Vincent and the Grenadines by its embassy in Bridgetown, Barbados.; Both countries are full members of the Commonwealth of Nations.
United States	16 February 1942	See New Zealand–United States relations Prime Minister John Key and President Barack Obama, 2011. Historically, New Zealand has fought shoulder to shoulder with the United States, especially in both world wars and in the Korean and Vietnam wars. During the Second World War, around 400,000 US troops were stationed in New Zealand prior to departing for battles like Guadalcanal. New Zealand is a major non-NATO ally of the United States and has been since 1997. Despite the political contention over ANZUS, New Zealand forces have since cooperated with U.S. forces in the 1991 Gulf War and in the 2001 U.S. invasion of Afghanistan. New Zealand forces did not participate in the 2003 invasion of Iraq, but a contingent of New Zealand army engineers assisted with reconstruction work in Iraq after the war; they were based in Basra. New Zealand also participates in the ECHELON programme. In 2010, the United States and New Zealand began a new strategic partnership by signing the Wellington Declaration. According to the Prime Minister the Declaration was not a return to an ANZUS style security treaty, despite reports of increased military co-operation since 2007.: New Zealand has an embassy in Washington, D.C. and consulates-general in Honolulu, Los Angeles and New York City.; United States has an embassy in Wellington and a consulate-general in Auckland.
Uruguay		New Zealand is accredited to Uruguay from its embassy in Buenos Aires, Argentina and maintains an honorary consulate in Montevideo.; Uruguay is accredited in New Zealand from its embassy in Canberra, Australia and maintains an honorary consulate in Christchurch.; In November 2001, the Prime Minister, Helen Clark, paid the first visit to Uruguay by a New Zealand Head of Government.; In November 2007 the President of Uruguay, Tabaré Vázquez paid the first ever visit of an Uruguayan head of state to New Zealand.; Both countries are full members of the Cairns Group and of the Convention for the Conservation of Antarctic Marine Living Resources.; New Zealand Ministry of Foreign Affairs and Trade about relations with Uruguay

=== Asia ===
Country	Formal Relations Began	Notes
Azerbaijan	29 June 1992	See Azerbaijan—New Zealand relations: Azerbaijan is accredited to New Zealand from its embassy in Canberra, Australia.; New Zealand is accredited to Azerbaijan from its embassy in Moscow, Russia.
Bangladesh		See Bangladesh–New Zealand relations: Bangladesh is accredited to New Zealand from its high commission in Canberra, Australia.; New Zealand is accredited to Bangladesh from its high commission in New Delhi, India.
Brunei	1984-05-05	See Brunei–New Zealand relations: Brunei is accredited to New Zealand from its Ministry of Foreign Affairs in Bandar Seri Begawan.; New Zealand is accredited to Brunei from its high commission in Kuala Lumpur, Malaysia.; Both countries are full members of the Commonwealth of Nations.
China	22 December 1972	See China–New Zealand relations Countries which signed cooperation documents related to the Belt and Road Initiative. China and New Zealand have an excellent relationship which continues to improve. The bilateral relationship has grown to become one of New Zealand's most important. A free trade agreement between China and New Zealand was signed on 7 April 2008 by Premier of the People's Republic of China Wen Jiabao and Prime Minister of New Zealand Helen Clark in Beijing. It is the first free trade agreement that China has signed with any developed country. Historically, New Zealand contact with China started very early in its history with the first records of ethnic Chinese in New Zealand were immigrants from Guangdong province (Canton), who arrived during the 1860s gold rush era, with missionary, trade, extensive immigration and other links continuing during China's Republican era (1912–1949). The establishment of the People's Republic of China (PRC) brought these links to a halt.: China has an embassy in Wellington and a consulates-general in Auckland and Christchurch.; New Zealand has an embassy in Beijing and consulates-general in Chengdu, Guangzhou, Hong Kong and Shanghai.
India		See India–New Zealand relations India and New Zealand have been strong in some degrees though potentially slightly shaky in others. New Zealand and India are in the midst of considering a free trade deal, where in October 2009 new Indian Prime Minister Manmohan Singh told New Zealand Prime Minister John Key that he was willing to seriously consider a free trade deal. Whilst there is the potential for a free trade agreement between India and New Zealand to be beneficial for both nations, the idea has not been seriously considered with India having strong subsidies on its agricultural sector, one of New Zealand's biggest export markets. New Zealand and India relations have been slightly shaky in October 2010 with the comments of Paul Henry, a New Zealand talk-show host, making fun of Chief Minister of Delhi, Sheila Dikshit on live New Zealand television. The Indian foreign office summoned the New Zealand High Commissioner Rupert Holborow, where the Commissioner set the record straight by making clear that: "[Paul Henry's comments] reflect the views of only one media commentator (who has already been censored for other racist and unacceptable comments), and certainly not the New Zealand Government or people". India Prime Minister Manmohan Singh confirmed a continued intention to pursue a free trade agreement with the New Zealand Prime Minister John Key in late 2010, saying that: "Like China there is a recognition that they have a strong demand for food... so there is something in it for both parties if we can complete a deal". John Key confirmed that India and New Zealand have continued to work "scoping out" the possibility of a free trade agreement but said with caution that in any case "these things take time".: India has a high commission in Wellington.; New Zealand has a high commission in New Delhi and a consulate-general in Mumbai.
Indonesia	28 June 1958	See Indonesia–New Zealand relations Having common interests as democracies and neighbours in the Asia Pacific region, New Zealand and Indonesia are viewed as natural partners. Both countries are members of APEC.The diplomatic and economic ties have grown stronger ever since. Indonesia's commodity exports to New Zealand consist mainly of energy products and minerals as well as lumber and agriculture, while New Zealand's commodity exports to Indonesia mainly consists of dairy products and meats, such as beef, milk, and cheese.: Indonesia has an embassy in Wellington.; New Zealand has an embassy in Jakarta.
Iran	14 December 1973	See Iran–New Zealand relations: Iran has an embassy in Wellington.; New Zealand has an embassy in Tehran.
Israel		See Israel–New Zealand relations New Zealand has a long history of support for Israel beginning with the Partition Plan in 1947. New Zealand was at the very forefront of countries to recognise the State of Israel in the United Nations resolution of 1948. Relations were temporarily suspended around 2004 when two Israeli citizens were convicted of passport fraud, but these were restored soon after. It was suspected but never proved that they were working for Mossad. New Zealand joined with other countries in boycotting a UN Racism conference in defence of Israel due to fears of antisemitism in the conference.: Israel has an embassy in Wellington.; New Zealand is accredited to Israel from its embassy in Ankara, Turkey.
Japan	28 April 1952	See Japan–New Zealand relations New Zealand Prime Minister Keith Holyoake (left) met with Japanese Foreign Minister Masayoshi Ohira (right), in October 1972. Japan and New Zealand have had generally cordial relations since the post-World War II period, with Japan being a major trading partner with New Zealand. These relations have held together despite policy disputes over whaling and the International Whaling Commission. New Zealand was one of the four founding participants of the Japan Exchange and Teaching (JET) Programme, established in 1987 by the Japanese Government. The NZ International Business Forum, established in 2006 by major export-focused companies in New Zealand, has as one of its key goals negotiations for a free trade agreement with Japan. In March 2011, New Zealand sent an urban search and rescue team, which had spent time the previous three weeks searching buildings following the Canterbury earthquake, and 15 tonnes of rescue equipment to assist Japan following the Tōhoku earthquake and tsunami and Fukushima nuclear disaster. New Zealand Parliament sends condolences to the people of Japan, and the government donated $2 million to the Japanese Red Cross Society to support relief efforts.: Japan has an embassy in Wellington and two consulates-general in Auckland and Christchurch.; New Zealand has an embassy in Tokyo.
Malaysia	25 September 1957	Both countries established diplomatic relations on 25 September 1957 See Malaysia–New Zealand relations: Malaysia has a high commission in Wellington.; New Zealand has a high commission in Kuala Lumpur.; Both countries are full members of the Commonwealth of Nations.
Myanmar	15 November 1958	Myanmar is accredited to New Zealand from its embassy in Canberra, Australia.; New Zealand has an embassy in Yangon.; In February 2021, New Zealand suspended high-level bilateral military and political relations with Myanmar following the 2021 Myanmar coup d'état. The New Zealand Government has joined other Western governments in refusing to recognise the new military-led government and has called for the restoration of civilian-led rule. In addition, aid projects were diverted away from the Tatmadaw and a travel ban was imposed on Myanmar's military leaders.; In April 2024, the National-led coalitiong government permitted mid-level members of the military junta to participate in the ASEAN-New Zealand Dialogue's meetings in Wellington. Prime Minister Christopher Luxon justified the invitation, citing ASEAN's policy of allowing non-political Myanmar officials to participate in ASEAN events. He reiterated that New Zealand's travel ban on those responsible for the 2021 coup remained unchanged. The participation of Myanmar officials in the 2024 ASEAN-NZ Dialogue was a reversal of the previous Labour Government's policy of banning Myanmar officials from participating in two ASEAN study tours of New Zealand. The National-led government's U-turn was criticised by Myanmar community representative and union leader Phyo Sandar Soe and former Prime Minister Helen Clark, who is also a convenor of the Kia Kaha Myanmar activist group.
North Korea		See New Zealand–North Korea relations Although diplomatic relations were established between New Zealand and North Korea in 2001, a 2007 trip by New Zealand Foreign Affairs Minister Winston Peters to Pyongyang, the capital city of North Korea was the first visit by a New Zealand foreign minister to that country. The trip was about establishing economic and political deals with economically crippled North Korea on the basis that it start dismantling its nuclear weapons facilities. United States Secretary of State Condoleezza Rice congratulated Peters on his effort in negotiating with a potential nuclear threat and welcomed Peters' actions on the matter.: New Zealand is accredited to North Korea from its embassy in Seoul, South Korea.; North Korea is accredited to New Zealand from its embassy in Jakarta, Indonesia.
Pakistan		See New Zealand–Pakistan relations: Pakistan has a high commission in Wellington.; New Zealand is accredited to Pakistan from its embassy in Tehran, Iran.
Philippines		See New Zealand–Philippines relations: New Zealand has an embassy in Manila.; Philippines has an embassy in Wellington.
Singapore	22 November 1965	See New Zealand–Singapore relations: New Zealand has a high commission in Singapore.; Singapore has a high commission in Wellington.
South Korea	26 March 1962	See New Zealand-South Korea relations Both countries established diplomatic relations on 26 March 1962: New Zealand and South Korea have strong also good diplomatic relations.; New Zealand has an embassy in Seoul.; South Korea has an embassy in Wellington and a consulate-general in Auckland.; South Korea has a consulate in Auckland.; Bilateral trade in 2022 was about $5.35 billion.
Taiwan		See New Zealand–Taiwan relations: New Zealand has a New Zealand Commerce and Industry Office in Taipei.; Taiwan has a Taipei Economic and Cultural Office in New Zealand in Wellington.
Thailand	26 March 1956	See New Zealand–Thailand relations: New Zealand has an embassy in Bangkok.; Thailand has an embassy in Wellington.
Turkey		See New Zealand–Turkey relations: New Zealand has an embassy in Ankara.; Turkey has an embassy in Wellington.; Both countries are members of OECD and WTO.; Trade volume between the two countries was US$152.8 million in 2015 (New Zealand's exports/imports: 62.7/90.1 million USD).; 1,700 Turkish citizens reside in New Zealand.
United Arab Emirates	20 May 1985	New Zealand has an embassy in Abu Dhabi.; United Arab Emirates has an embassy in Wellington.; In January 2025, the New Zealand government signed a comprehensive economic partnership agreement with the United Arab Emirates, cutting tariffs on 98.5% of New Zealand exports.
Vietnam	19 June 1975	See New Zealand–Vietnam relations New Zealand opened its embassy in Hanoi in 1995, while Vietnam established an embassy in Wellington in 2003.: New Zealand has an embassy in Hanoi and a consulate-general in Ho Chi Minh City.; Vietnam has an embassy in Wellington.

=== Europe ===
Country	Formal Relations Began	Notes
Albania		The relationship between Albania and New Zealand is closely linked to Kosovo and New Zealand, due to Kosovo's population being predominately ethnic Albanian. Albania's Ambassador to New Zealand is resident in Beijing, China whilst New Zealand's Ambassador to Albania is resident in Rome, Italy. In 2014, Albania opened its first consulate in Auckland to serve Albanians and New Zealanders of Albanian origin in the country. Dr. Tane Taylor, a New Zealand Māori lived in Tirana, Albania for 20 years, serves as the Honorary Consul and representative to New Zealand.
Croatia	25 February 1992	Croatia is accredited to New Zealand from its embassy in Canberra, Australia and maintains an honorary consulate in Auckland. Formerly represented as part of the Yugoslav Embassy in Wellington, until the breakup of Yugoslavia in 1991.; New Zealand is accredited to Croatia from its embassy in Rome, Italy and maintains an honorary consulate in Zagreb.
Denmark		See Denmark–New Zealand relations: Denmark is accredited to New Zealand from its embassy in Canberra, Australia and maintains an honorary consulate in Wellington.; New Zealand is accredited to Denmark from its embassy in The Hague, Netherlands and maintains an honorary consulate in Copenhagen.
Estonia	6 January 1992	See Estonia–New Zealand relations: Estonia is accredited to New Zealand from its embassy in Canberra, Australia.; New Zealand is accredited to Estonia from its embassy in Warsaw, Poland.
France		See France–New Zealand relations: Relations between both nations strained in 1985 when French DGSE agents sank the Rainbow Warrior in Waitematā Harbour. Two French agents were arrested and convicted but released in exchange for monetary compensation after France put economic pressure on New Zealand.; France has an embassy in Wellington.; New Zealand has an embassy in Paris and a consulate-general in Nouméa, New Caledonia.
Germany	10 November 1953	See Germany–New Zealand relations: Germany has an embassy in Wellington.; New Zealand has an embassy in Berlin and a consulate-general in Hamburg.
Greece		See Greece–New Zealand relations Stemming from World War II, New Zealand forces fought alongside the Greeks in continental Greece and Crete since then, Greece has claimed a special relationship with New Zealand. An under-equipped force made-up of largely New Zealand, Australian, British and Greek troops fought to protect the island from invasion. The Battle of Crete is commemorated every year in both Crete and New Zealand. Prime Minister Helen Clark led a large party from New Zealand to Crete in May 2001 to attend the 60th anniversary of the battle. The Minister of Foreign Affairs, Hon Phil Goff, attended anniversary celebrations in May 2003 and Hon Annette King in May 2006. The war was followed by a modest wave of Greek emigration to New Zealand. In the 2006 Census 2,547 people primarily identified themselves as being Greek. A bilateral Social Security Agreement came into force on 1 April 1994. New Zealand operated an embassy in Greece until 1991, and has been represented via the Italian Embassy in Rome ever since. Greece operated an embassy in Wellington from 1999 until 2015, when it closed down amidst the Greek government-debt crisis.: Greece is accredited to New Zealand from its embassy in Canberra, Australia.; New Zealand is accredited to Greece from its embassy in Rome, Italy.
Holy See		The Holy See has a nunciature in Wellington.; New Zealand is accredited to the Holy See from its embassy in Madrid, Spain.; In 1984, John Paul II gave a speech to the ambassador of New Zealand at the Holy See. He later visited the country in 1986.; Pope in New Zealand
Hungary		Hungary has an embassy in Wellington.; New Zealand is accredited to Hungary from its embassy in Vienna, Austria.
Ireland		See Ireland–New Zealand relations: Ireland has an embassy in Wellington.; New Zealand has an embassy in Dublin.; Both countries are full members of the Organisation for Economic Co-operation and Development.
Kosovo	2010	See Kosovo–New Zealand relations New Zealand recognised Kosovo's independence in November 2009. Both countries established diplomatic relations in 2010, with Kosovo's first Ambassador to Wellington being Dr. Muhamet Haliti. In 2014 the Kosovo Embassy in Australia became fully integrated to represent Kosovo in New Zealand, with Sabri Kicmari becoming the first Kosovo Ambassador to visit New Zealand, Niue and the Cook Islands. New Zealand is represented in Kosovo by its embassy in Rome, Italy. During the breakup of Yugoslavia and the Kosovo war, New Zealand sympathised with Kosovo's ethnic Albanian majority. It began advocating for peace and support in the international arena, namely the United Nations, and sent a contingent as part of the international peace keeping force between 2000 and 2006. New Zealand abstained from the vote to send Kosovo's independence to the International Court of Justice, its judge at the ICJ voted in support of Kosovo, it has voted for Kosovo to join UNESCO and continues to support Kosovo's endeavours to join international organisations. New Zealand is home to 3,500 Kosovo-born New Zealanders, predominately Albanians but also a small number of Bosniaks, Serbs and Croats. Kosovo is home to small expat community of New Zealanders, namely Kosovo Albanians who have returned to Kosovo post-independence.: Kosovo is accredited to New Zealand from its embassy in Canberra, Australia. Formerly represented as part of the Yugoslav Embassy in Wellington, until the breakup of Yugoslavia in 1991.; New Zealand does not have an accreditation to Kosovo.
Lithuania	10 January 1992	See Lithuania–New Zealand relations: Lithuania is accredited to New Zealand from its embassy in Canberra, Australia and maintains an honorary consulate in Auckland.; New Zealand is accredited to Lithuania from its embassy in Warsaw, Poland and maintains an honorary consulate in Vilnius.
Netherlands		See Netherlands–New Zealand relations Historically there has been a strong link between New Zealand and the Netherlands. The first European sightings of New Zealand was by the Dutch explorer Abel Tasman in 1642 and New Zealand was named after the Dutch province of Zeeland. Relations however did not start well when Māori killed several of the Abel Tasman's crew after he sent out a shore party. Tasman mapped a section of the North Island and left and there was no further contact between the Netherlands and New Zealand for more than a hundred years. Once New Zealand was established as a state in 1840 relations have been good. The relationship was enhanced significantly with migration of large numbers of Dutch people to New Zealand after World War II. As a result of negotiations between the Dutch and New Zealand Governments a migration agreement was signed in October 1950. This resulted in thousands of Dutch immigrants coming to New Zealand in subsequent years. Peaking between 1951 and 1954. As of 2006, it is estimated that well over 100,000 New Zealanders have some Dutch connection. The 2006 census shows that 28,641 people identified their ethnic group as Dutch. New Zealand and the Netherlands share very similar social attitudes and values and have a substantial history of working together on issues of international importance. They often cooperate closely in multilateral forums. In many international meetings the Netherlands delegation is seated immediately alongside New Zealand.: Netherlands has an embassy in Wellington.; New Zealand has an embassy in The Hague.
North Macedonia	8 April 1993	New Zealand is accredited to North Macedonia from its embassy in Rome, Italy.; North Macedonia is accredited to New Zealand from its embassy in Canberra, Australia. Formerly represented as part of the Yugoslav Embassy in Wellington, until the breakup of Yugoslavia in 1991.
Norway	10 October 1969	See New Zealand–Norway relations Reidar Sveaas, director of P&O Maritime Ltd. and honorary consul to Auckland said in 2000 that excellent opportunities existed for New Zealand to trade with the world's second largest oil-producing country, Norway. New Zealand joined 11 other countries in 2006 in delivering a formal diplomatic protest to the Norwegian Foreign Ministry in Oslo over Norway's plans to increase its whaling activities. In 2004 Helen Clark, became the first New Zealand prime minister to ever visit Norway. She said that both countries see eye-to-eye on almost everything but the commercial harvesting of whales.: New Zealand is accredited to Norway from its embassy in The Hague, Netherlands.; Norway is accredited to New Zealand from its embassy in Canberra, Australia.
Poland	1 March 1973	See New Zealand–Poland relations: New Zealand has an embassy in Warsaw.; Poland has an embassy in Wellington.
Russia	13 April 1944	See New Zealand–Russia relations: New Zealand has an embassy in Moscow and an honorary consulate in Vladivostok.; Russia has an embassy in Wellington.; Both countries are members of APEC.
Serbia	29 December 1970	New Zealand is accredited to Serbia from its embassy in Rome, Italy.; Serbia is accredited to New Zealand from its embassy in Canberra, Australia. It was formerly represented as part of the Yugoslav Embassy in Wellington, until the breakup of Yugoslavia in 1991.; Serbian Ambassador Milivoje Glišić, presented his Letter of Credence to the Governor General of New Zealand Silvia Cartwright on 4 February 2003.; New Zealand and Serbia have four bilateral treaties in force including the most favoured nation treaty from 1960.; Trade between the two countries was based on a very modest exchange totalling US$2.3 million in 2006 but it rose significantly in 2007 to EUR 805 million.; In the 2006 census, over 1,000 New Zealand residents claimed to be of Serbian ethnicity.
Spain	28 March 1969	See New Zealand–Spain relations: New Zealand has an embassy in Madrid.; Spain has an embassy in Wellington.
Sweden		See New Zealand–Sweden relations: New Zealand has an embassy in Stockholm.; Sweden is accredited to New Zealand from its embassy in Canberra, Australia.
Ukraine	3 March 1992	New Zealand–Ukraine relations; New Zealand is accredited to Ukraine from its embassy in Warsaw, Poland.; Ukraine is accredited to New Zealand from its embassy in Canberra, Australia.
United Kingdom	March 1939	See New Zealand–United Kingdom relations New Zealand established diplomatic relations with the United Kingdom in March 1939. Both countries are Commonwealth Realms.: New Zealand maintains a high commission in London.; The United Kingdom is accredited to New Zealand through its high commission in Wellington, in addition to a consulate general in Auckland.; The UK governed New Zealand from 1840 until 1947, when New Zealand achieved full independence. Both countries share common membership of the Commonwealth, CPTPP, Five Eyes, the Five Power Defence Arrangements, OECD, the UKUSA Agreement, and the World Trade Organization. Bilaterally the two countries have Free Trade Agreement, and a Reciprocal Healthcare Agreement. Despite The King as the head of state of New Zealand and one of two official national anthems being God Save the King, the relationship has been variable over time. Up to the 1960s, New Zealand also had extremely close economic relations with the United Kingdom, especially considering the distance at which trade took place. As an example, in 1955, Britain took 65.3 percent of New Zealand's exports, and only during the following decades did this dominant position begin to decline as the United Kingdom oriented itself more towards the European Union, with the share of exports going to Britain having fallen to only 6.2 percent in 2000. Historically, some industries, such as dairying, a major economic factor in the former colony, had even more dominant trade links, with 80–100% of all cheese and butter exports going to Britain from around 1890 to 1940. This strong bond also supported the mutual feelings for each other in other areas.

=== Oceania ===
Country	Formal Relations Began	Notes
Australia		See Australia–New Zealand relations New Zealand's relations with Australia are very close; the Closer Economic Relations agreement gives each country access to the other's markets, and the Trans-Tasman Travel Arrangement allows New Zealanders and Australians automatic residency in each other's countries. As a result of the latter agreement, there is substantial migration between the two countries but especially from New Zealand to Australia, with over 500,000 New Zealanders living in Australia and 65,000 Australians living in New Zealand. The Australian Constitution allows for New Zealand to become part of Australia, and although the idea is sometimes floated it has little support in Australia and less in New Zealand. In 2009 there were plans to effectively create domestic flights between New Zealand and Australia, but these have since been put on hold with the change in the Australian government.: Australia has a high commission in Wellington and a consulate-general in Auckland.; New Zealand has a high commission in Canberra and consulates-general in Melbourne and Sydney.
Cook Islands	1993	See Cook Islands–New Zealand relations: The Cook Islands maintains a High Commission in Wellington and a Consul-General in Auckland.; New Zealand maintains a High Commission in Rarotonga.
Fiji		See Fiji–New Zealand relations Since the 2006 Military Coup in Fiji relationships between the country have turned icy. In 2007 New Zealand's High Commissioner for Fiji Michael Green was expelled from Fiji by Military leader Frank Banimarama. Angry at this action the New Zealand government increased trade sanctions against the country while both major political parties saying the expulsion was outrageous and unacceptable.: Fiji has a high commission in Wellington.; New Zealand has a high commission in Suva.
Kiribati		See Kiribati–New Zealand relations: New Zealand has a high commission in Bairiki, Tarawa.; Kiribati has an honorary consulate in Wellington.
Niue	2 August 1993	See New Zealand–Niue relations: Niue is represented by a High Commission in New Zealand.; New Zealand is represented by a High Commission in Niue.
Papua New Guinea	1975	See New Zealand–Papua New Guinea relations: New Zealand has a high commission in Port Moresby.; Papua New Guinea has a high commission in Wellington.
Samoa	1 January 1962	See New Zealand–Samoa relations: New Zealand has a high commission in Apia.; Samoa has a high commission in Wellington and a consulate-general in Auckland.
Solomon Islands	7 July 1978	See New Zealand–Solomon Islands relations: New Zealand has a High Commission in Honiara.; Solomon Islands has a High Commission in Wellington.
Tonga	1970	See New Zealand–Tonga relations: New Zealand has a high commission in Nukuʻalofa.; Tonga has a consulate-general in Auckland.; On 7 March 2018, New Zealand Prime Minister Jacinda Ardern announced that New Zealand will give NZ$10 million to Tonga to help with rebuilding after the country was struck by Cyclone Gita.
Tuvalu		See New Zealand–Tuvalu relations: New Zealand is accredited to Tuvalu by a New Zealand-based high commissioner.; Tuvalu has a high commission in Wellington.
Vanuatu		New Zealand has a high commission in Port Vila.; Vanuatu has a high commission in Wellington and a consulate-general in Auckland.; Following the 2024 Port Vila earthquake, New Zealand dispatched New Zealand Defence Force, Urban Search and Rescue and MFAT personnel, equipment and supplies to assist with post-disaster rescue and relief efforts.

== See also ==
- New Zealand Ministry of Foreign Affairs and Trade
- List of ambassadors and high commissioners to and from New Zealand
- List of diplomatic missions in New Zealand
- List of diplomatic missions of New Zealand
- Foreign relations of Niue
- Foreign relations of the Cook Islands
- Global Peace Index
- Contents of the United States diplomatic cables leak (New Zealand)
