= Finland–New Zealand relations =

- Finland: New Zealand

Diplomatic mission
- Embassy of Finland, Canberra: Embassy of New Zealand, Stockholm

Finland–New Zealand relations (Finnish: Suomen ja Uuden-Seelannin suhteet) are the bilateral relations between Finland and New Zealand.

Foreign relations are present between Finland and New Zealand. Diplomatic relations were established on 22 July 1950. Finland is accredited to New Zealand from its embassy in Canberra, Australia. New Zealand is accredited to Finland from its embassy in Stockholm, Sweden. Both countries share common membership of the International Criminal Court and OECD.

== Diplomatic relations ==
The two countries established diplomatic relations on July 22, 1950. The two countries share similar views on many international issues, including security, disarmament and the environment, and cooperate in the UN and the OECD. Finland is a member of several initiatives initiated by New Zealand, including the Small Advanced Economy Initiative, the Fossil Fuel Friends Reform Group, and the Global Research Alliance.

A new dimension was added to the relationship between the countries with Finland's accession to the European Union in 1995.

New Zealand and Finland have a working holiday program, which is very popular among young Finns who are able to spend up to a year in New Zealand.

== High level visits ==
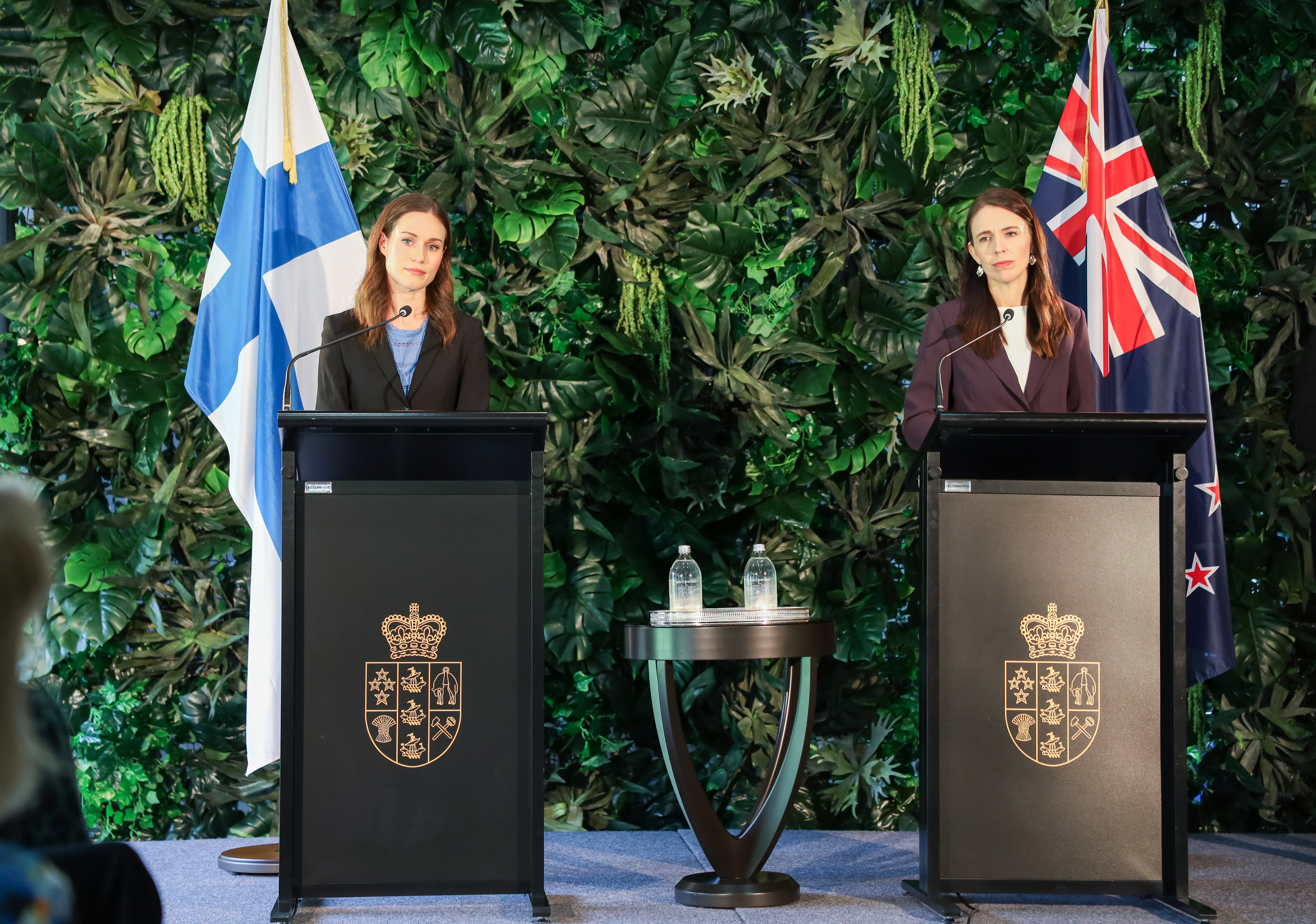
Prime Minister Sanna Marin and New Zealand Prime Minister Jacinda Ardern in 2022

- November–December 2013 – Alexander Stubb visited New Zealand and Australia as Minister for Foreign Trade.
- 30 November 2022 – Finnish Prime Minister Sanna Marin visited Auckland, the first visit of a Finnish prime minister to New Zealand, and met New Zealand Prime Minister Jacinda Ardern.

== Trade ==
In 2018, trade between the countries amounted to NZ$221 million, with exports, mainly sheep and venison, amounting to NZ$46 million, while imports, mainly including machinery, pork, paper and cardboard, amounted to NZ$174 million.

== Resident diplomatic missions ==
- Finland is accredited to New Zealand from its embassy in Canberra, Australia.
- New Zealand is accredited to Finland from its embassy in Stockholm, Sweden.

== See also ==
- Foreign relations of Finland
- Foreign relations of New Zealand
- New Zealand-EU relations
