= Reactions to the ROKS Cheonan sinking =

When the South Korea-led international investigation's report on the sinking was released on 20 May 2010 there was international condemnation of the North's actions. China was an exception as they simply termed the incident "unfortunate" and "urged stability on the peninsula." This was speculated to be China's concern for instability on the Korean Peninsula. Christian Oliver stated in The Financial Times that South Korea needs to explain why its navy started shooting northwards immediately, thus risking starting a war, and give reassurance on the competence of predominantly conscript forces.

== International organizations ==
Organization of American States

The Secretary General of the Organization of American States José Miguel Insulza called the sinking of the Cheonan, "a clear violation of international law and a threat to world peace and security[...]".

United Nations

United Nations Secretary-General Ban Ki-moon, himself a South Korean national, took an unusual step of demanding action against North Korea: "I'm confident that the [Security] Council, in fulfilling its responsibility for the maintenance of international peace and security, will take measures appropriate to the gravity of the situation." The United Nations Command investigated whether the sinking was a violation of the armistice. The Command said it was convening a "special investigations team" (SIT) to "review the findings" of the investigation into the incident and would "determine the scope of the armistice violation." The SIT team included Australia, Canada, Denmark, France, New Zealand, South Korea, Turkey, the United Kingdom, the United States, Sweden and Switzerland.

On 14 June 2010, South Korea presented the results of its investigation to United Nations Security Council members. In a subsequent meeting with council members North Korea stated that it had nothing to do with the incident. On 9 July 2010 the United Nations Security Council made a Presidential Statement condemning the attack but without identifying the attacker. China had resisted U.S. calls for a tougher line against North Korea.

== Africa ==
Kenya

Minister of Foreign Affairs Moses Wetangula stated that "It is obvious that such acts of aggression only serve to perpetuate a state of insecurity between the two Koreas[...]". The Kenyan government condemned the attack, and expressed its condolences to South Korea.

== Asia ==
Bangladesh

The Government of Bangladesh expressed its deep concern at the sinking of the vessel and conveyed to the government of the Republic of Korea sincerest condolences for the lives lost in the incident.

China

China refused to condemn either side over the incident. Chinese Vice Foreign Minister Cui Tiankai stated that the sinking was "unfortunate" and that any response to the incident should be aimed at maintaining peace on the Korean Peninsula. Prime Minister Wen Jiabao however, vowed that China "will not protect" the perpetrators of the sinking. After the release of the South Korean investigation report, the Ministry of Foreign Affairs through its spokesman Ma Zhaoxu refrained from condemning North Korea, stating that "all parties should stay calm, exercise restraint and properly handle relevant issues so as to avoid the escalation of the situation." Researchers at the Stockholm International Peace Research Institute, drawing on interviews with Chinese officials and foreign policy experts, argued that there existed an "inability of the top leadership to reach a consensus on how to react" to the issue.

India

The Ministry of External Affairs of India released a statement on the same day, "The Korean government has shared with us the details of the investigation of the Civil-Military Joint Investigation Team to determine the cause of the sinking of the Cheonan. We condemn and express our condolences to the Korean government for the tragic loss of life. India highly appreciates the ROK's handling of this case with maturity and self-discipline to maintain regional peace and stability."

Japan

The Ministry of Foreign Affairs expressed its support for the government of South Korea. Prime Minister Yukio Hatoyama later condemned North Korea for the sinking of the Cheonan, and stated that the tensions on the Korean Peninsula were an important reason to maintain American-Japanese relations and were a key reason to keep U.S. forces in an airbase on Okinawa.. The government of Japan has announced its intention to strengthen economic sanctions against North Korea.

Philippines

The Department of Foreign Affairs condemned the sinking of the Cheonan and expressed solidarity with the South Korean government. The Filipino government called for North Korea to honor international obligations, and hoped there would be no further deterioration of stability on the Korean Peninsula.

Vietnam

Foreign Ministry Spokeswoman Nguyen Phuong Nga said: "The sinking of Cheonan is a regrettable incident. The Government of Vietnam expresses its heart-felt condolences to the Government of the Republic of Korea for the loss of lives in the sinking. Vietnam has attentively and closely been following the current developments in the Korean Peninsula. Vietnam consistently and persistently supports peace, stability in the Korean Peninsula, and favors dialogue for peaceful settlement of all matters. Vietnam wishes that parties concerned could exercise restraint for the sake of peace, stability in the Korean Peninsula and in the region."

== Australasia ==
Australia

Government of Australia officially condemned the sinking of the Cheonan, stating that it believed North Korea was responsible.

New Zealand

New Zealand Minister of Foreign Affairs Murray McCully condemned North Korea's sinking of the Cheonan, urging North Korea to refrain from further destabilising acts and expressing solidarity with South Korea.

== Europe ==
Denmark

Foreign Affairs Minister Lene Espersen condemned the sinking of the Cheonan, stating that it believed North Korea was responsible. The Minister called on North Korea to comply with its international obligations.

France

French Minister of Foreign Affairs Bernard Kouchner, expressed to his South Korean counterpart, Yu Myung-hwan, France's very firm condemnation of the attack which was directed against the Republic of Korea. Bernard Kouchner assured him of France's wholehearted solidarity, and that of her European partners, in this ordeal.

Germany

The German Foreign Minister Guido Westerwelle condemned the sinking of the South Korean warship Cheonan and expressed his concern at the violence. "We appeal to all participants to contain themselves, and call for rationality and reconciliation to prevail. We would like to and can only request that all of the participants remain level-headed."

Greece

The Ministry of Foreign Affairs offered their condolences to South Korea, while stating that, "Greece unequivocally condemns such actions, which jeopardize regional peace and stability and undermine good neighbourly relations."

Portugal

The government of Portugal expressed solidarity with South Korea and condemned the sinking of the Cheonan, stating that the attack, "endangers the stability of the Korean Peninsula and the region."

Romania

The Ministry of Foreign Affairs offered "condolences and compassion [...] to the Government [of South Korea] and families of the deceased" while condemning the attack on the Cheonan, which it deemed "a grave threat to security and stability" in the region.

Turkey

Turkish government announced their support for South Korea after the conclusion of the international investigation, with the Ministry of Foreign Affairs declaring, "Turkey stands in solidarity with our friend and ally South Korean government and its people in this tragic incident [...] It is obvious that this development will result in further increasing the isolation of North Korea."

United Kingdom

British Foreign Secretary William Hague said in a statement released 19 May "The UK experts are in no doubt as to the veracity of the investigation's findings. The DPRK's actions will deepen the international community's mistrust. The attack demonstrates a total indifference to human life and a blatant disregard of international obligations."

== North America ==
Canada

Canadian Prime Minister Stephen Harper condemned the attack and gave full support to President Lee Myung-bak. Prime Minister Harper announced in an official report that Canada, who sent three navy experts to aid in the inspection of the Cheonan wreck, will tighten sanctions against North Korea, including restrictions on trade, investment and other bilateral relations. Visits to Canada by high-ranking North Korean officials have also been suspended.

Guatemala

The Guatemalan Ministry of External Relations expressed solidarity with South Korea and called for stability on the Korean peninsula.

United States

United States Secretary of State Hillary Clinton condemned the attack and said that it can't be "business as usual" on the Korean peninsula and called for an international response. She believed that there must be "consequences" for North Korea's actions. On 24 May 2010, the Pentagon announced a joint military exercise by U.S. and South Korean forces—cited to be response to the sinking and focusing on anti-submarine and maritime interdiction capabilities.

== South America ==
Brazil

Brazilian Ministry of External Relations issued a statement saying the government expresses solidarity with South Korea and urged stability on the Korean Peninsula.

Chile

Chilean Ministry of Foreign Affairs released a statement condemning the attack on the Cheonan as a violation of the United Nations Charter and international law. The Chilean Minister of Foreign Affairs would later pay tribute to the deceased South Korean sailors at a funeral service in Seoul.

Venezuela

The Venezuelan President Hugo Chávez accused the United States of putting a bomb on the Cheonan. According to him, this action is part of a "yankee conspiracy" ongoing during the FIFA World Cup 2010, with the purpose of starting a war in Korea.
