= Azerbaijan–New Zealand relations =

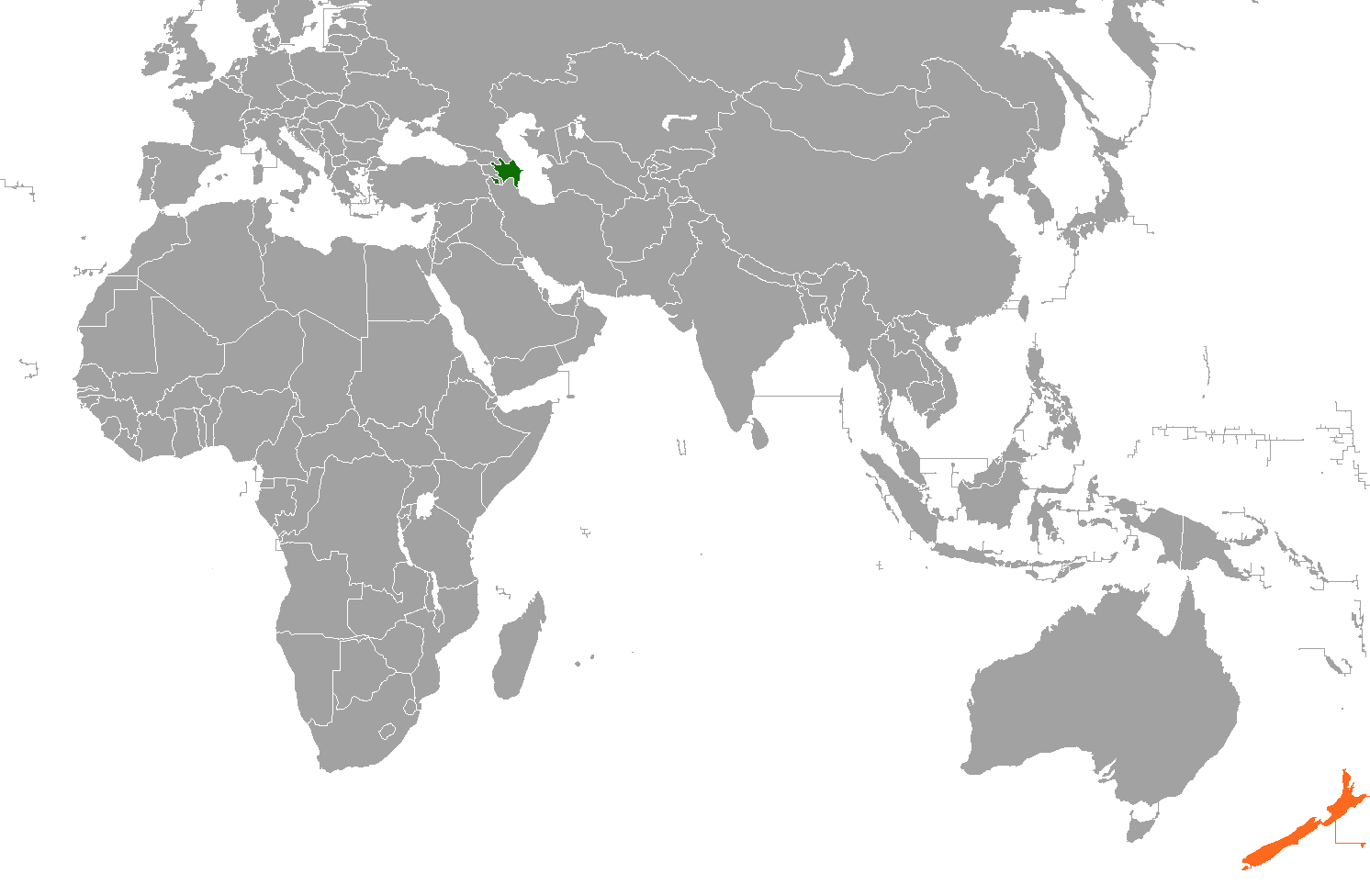

- Azerbaijan: New Zealand

Azerbaijan–New Zealand relations refer to the bilateral relations between Azerbaijan and New Zealand. Neither country has a resident ambassador.

== Diplomatic relations ==
Diplomatic relations between Azerbaijan and New Zealand were established on 29 June 1992.

The diplomatic representation of Azerbaijan in New Zealand is located in Canberra (Australia). The diplomatic representation of New Zealand in Azerbaijan is located in Moscow (Russia).

== Inter-parliamentary relations ==
On 17 December 2013, a working group on inter-parliamentary relations between Azerbaijan and New Zealand was established in the Milli Majlis (Parliament of Azerbaijan). The head of the group is Chingiz Ganizade.

In October 2016, at the initiative of the Azerbaijani Embassy to Australia and New Zealand, a friendship group on inter-parliamentary relations between Azerbaijan and New Zealand was established in the House of Representatives in the New Zealand Parliament. The group is chaired by Todd Miller.

The Milli Majlis of Azerbaijan also has a friendship group for inter-parliamentary relations, consisting of 17 members and led by Khanlar Fatiev.

== High-level visits ==
On 5–6 December 2013, New Zealand Prime Minister's special envoy for Central Asia, former Prime Minister of New Zealand Jim Bolger, paid an official visit to Azerbaijan. During the visit, the emissary met with the Chairman of the Milli Majlis of Azerbaijan – Ogtay Asadov, the Deputy head of the Administration under the President of Azerbaijan Novruz Mammadov, and Deputy Minister of Foreign Affairs Khalaf Khalafov.

== Economic cooperation ==
Trade turnover (in thousands of US dollars)

Year 2013	Trade turnover	Export 20.0	Import 15.590 000
2014	15.790 000 21 108.8	143.3	20 965.5
2015	17 531.7	0	17 531.7
2016	40 077.2	82.4	39 994.8
2017	48 017.6	107	47 910.6
2018	44 460.8	119.7	44 41.1

According to statistics from the United Nations Trade Office (COMTRADE), in 2010, the volume of pork imports to Azerbaijan amounted to 18.41 thousand US dollars.

== See also ==
- Foreign relations of Azerbaijan
- Foreign relations of New Zealand
