= Kosovo–New Zealand relations =

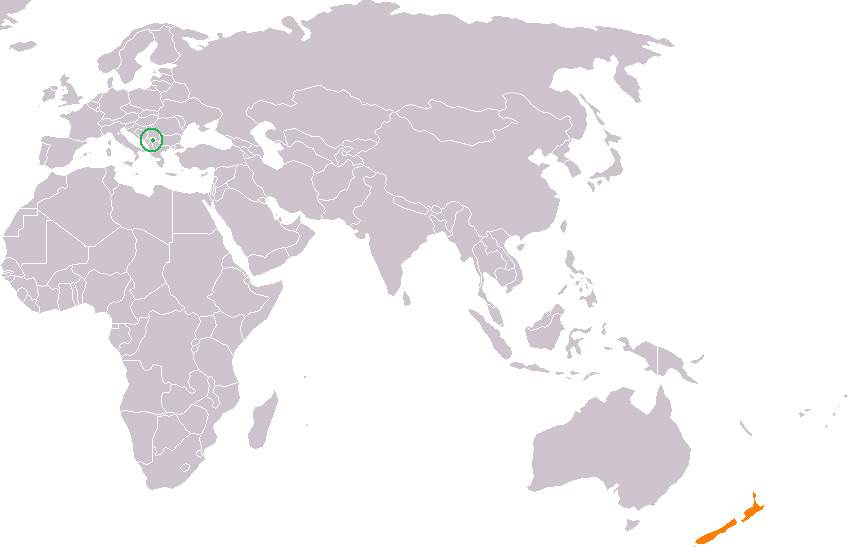

- Kosovo: New Zealand

Kosovo–New Zealand relations refer to the bilateral relations between Kosovo and New Zealand. New Zealand recognised Kosovo's independence in November 2009. Both countries established diplomatic relations in 2010, with Kosovo's first Ambassador to Wellington being Dr. Muhamet Haliti. In 2014, the Kosovo Embassy in Australia became fully integrated to represent Kosovo in New Zealand, with Sabri Kicmari becoming the first Kosovo Ambassador to visit New Zealand, Niue and the Cook Islands. New Zealand is represented in Kosovo by its embassy in Rome, Italy. During the breakup of Yugoslavia and the Kosovo war, New Zealand sympathised with Kosovo's ethnic Albanian majority. It began advocating for peace and support in the international arena, namely the United Nations, and sent a contingent as part of the international peace keeping force between 2000 and 2006. New Zealand abstained from the vote to send Kosovo's independence to the International Court of Justice, its judge at the ICJ voted in support of Kosovo, it has voted for Kosovo to join UNESCO and continues to support Kosovo's endeavours to join international organisations. New Zealand is home to 3,500 Kosovo-born New Zealanders, predominately Albanians but also a small number of Bosniaks, Serbs and Croats. Kosovo is home to small expat community of New Zealanders, namely Kosovo Albanians who have returned to Kosovo post-independence.

== Diplomatic missions ==
- Kosovo is accredited to New Zealand from its embassy in Canberra, Australia. Formerly represented as part of the Yugoslav Embassy in Wellington, until the breakup of Yugoslavia in 1991.
- New Zealand does not have an accreditation to Kosovo.

== See also ==
- Foreign relations of Kosovo
- Foreign relations of New Zealand
