= Bangladesh–New Zealand relations =

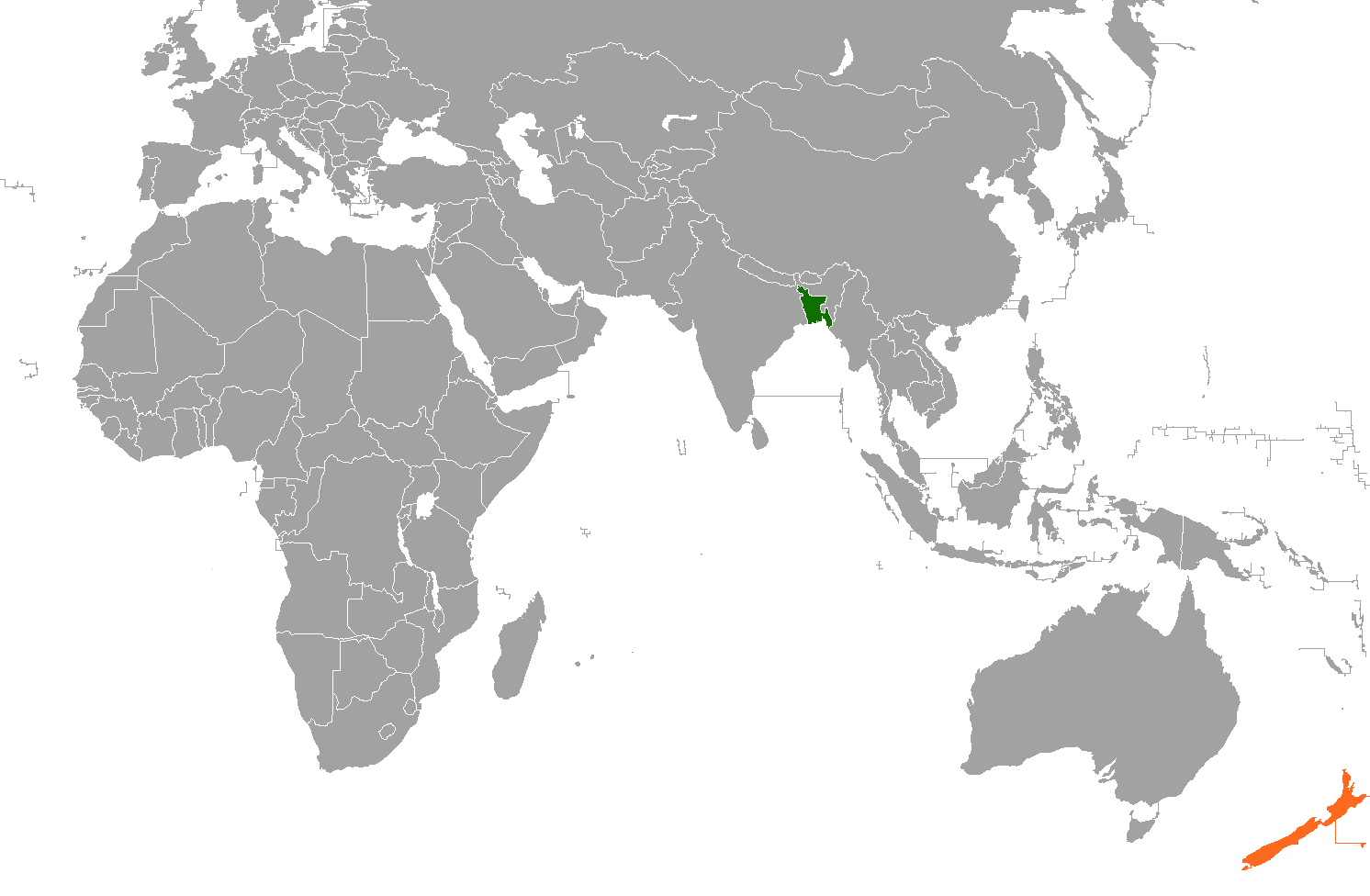

- Bangladesh: New Zealand

Bangladesh–New Zealand relations refer to the bilateral relations between Bangladesh and New Zealand.

== Diplomatic relations ==
Bangladesh and New Zealand do not share direct diplomatic relations with each other. The High Commission of New Zealand to India in New Delhi is dual accredited to Bangladesh while the High Commission of Bangladesh to Australia in Canberra is dual accredited to New Zealand.

== High level visits ==
In August 2009, then Health Minister of Bangladesh Dr Ruhal Haque visited Wellington. In 2014, special envoy to the Prime Minister of New Zealand, Sir Jim Bolger paid an official four-day visit to Dhaka.

== Educational cooperation ==
Bangladesh and New Zealand have been cooperating with each other in the education sector. Every year a number of Bangladeshi undergraduate and graduate students are granted scholarships to study in New Zealand.

== Economic cooperation ==
Bilateral trade between Bangladesh and New Zealand has been growing steadily. New Zealand has become one of the new markets for the Bangladeshi shipbuilding industry when the Government of New Zealand signed a deal with Western Marine Shipyard in 2013 to build an oceangoing vessel that would operate between Tokelau and Samoa Islands. When built, it would be the first Bangladeshi-made ship for the Pacific. The deal, however, raised some controversies as the New Zealand government chose a foreign firm over the local shipyards. Other Bangladeshi exports to New Zealand include woven and woolen garments, jute products etc. The bilateral trade is largely on New Zealand's favor. In 2011, the bilateral trade between the two countries amounted to almost US$200 million, of which, a little over $150 million were New Zealand's export to Bangladesh. New Zealand's export items are largely dominated by dairy products.

== See also ==
- Foreign relations of Bangladesh
- Foreign relations of New Zealand
