= New Zealand–North Korea relations =

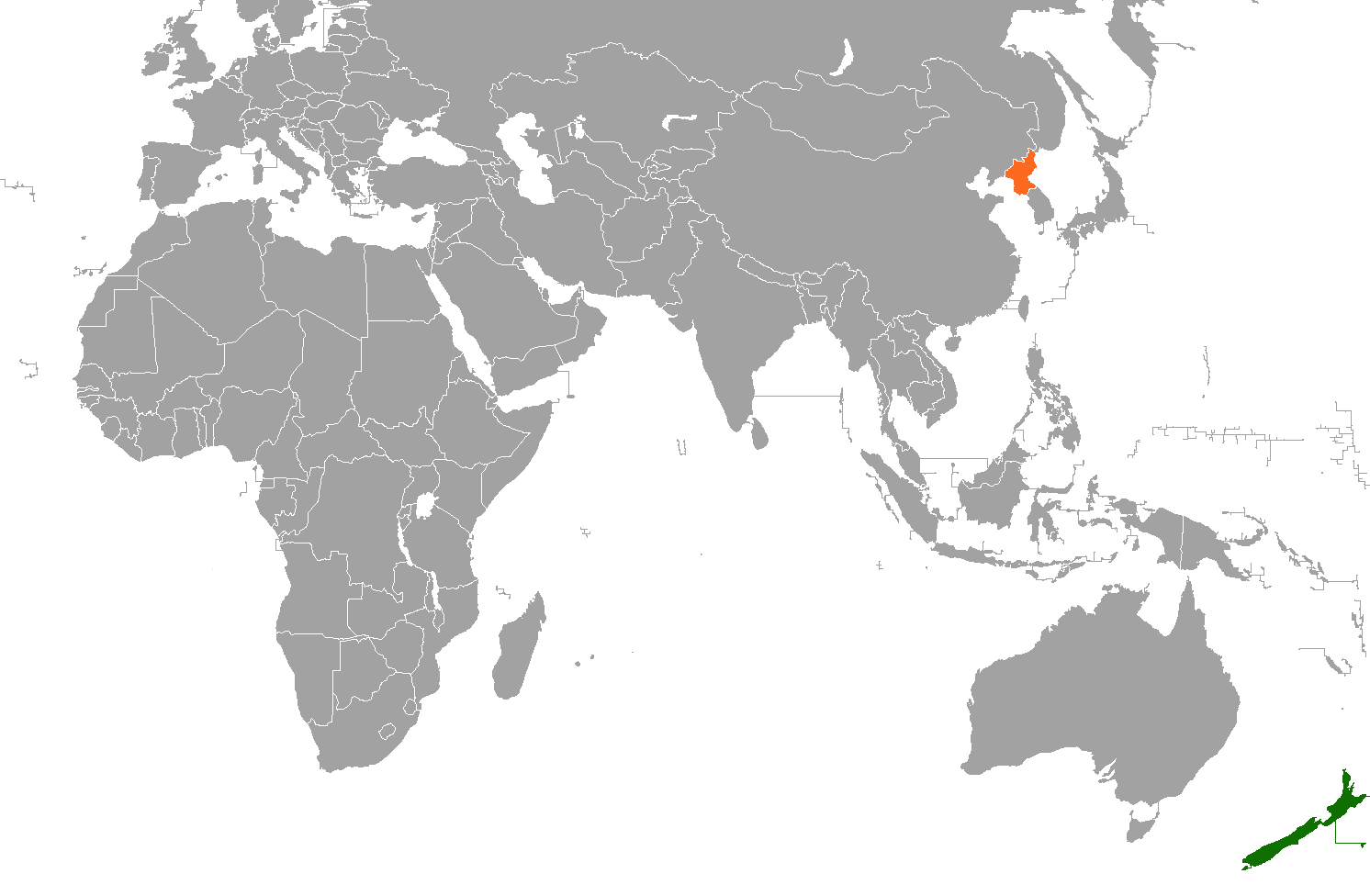

- New Zealand: North Korea

New Zealand–North Korea relations are the bilateral relations between New Zealand and North Korea. Relations between the two countries have been almost non-existent since the division of Korea. During the Korean War in the 1950s, New Zealand troops fought as part of the United Nations force that repelled the North Korean invasion of South Korea. Since then, New Zealand and North Korea have had little contact, until July 2000 when North Korean Foreign Minister Paek Nam-sun and New Zealand Minister of Foreign Affairs Phil Goff met in Bangkok, leading to the establishment of diplomatic relations in March 2001. The New Zealand ambassador to South Korea based in Seoul is also cross-accredited to North Korea. In 2006, North Korea tested its first nuclear weapon, drawing criticism and suspension of relations by the New Zealand government, which holds a staunch anti-nuclear policy. New Zealand began re-establishing formal relations in 2007, when the New Zealand Minister of Foreign Affairs Winston Peters visited Pyongyang on November 20 to discuss possible political and economic deals with North Korea, on the basis that it started dismantling its nuclear weapons facilities.

== History ==
The Korean War was an escalation of a civil war between two rival Korean regimes, each of which was supported by external powers, with each trying to topple the other through political and guerrilla tactics. After failing to strengthen their cause in the free elections held in South Korea during May 1950 and the refusal of South Korea to hold new elections per North Korean demands, the communist North Korean Army moved south on June 25, 1950, to attempt to reunite the Korean peninsula, which had been formally divided since 1948.

New Zealand was among those that responded to the UN call for help. New Zealand joined 15 other nations including Britain and the United States in the anti-communist war. However, the Korean War was also significant, as it marked New Zealand's first move towards association with the United States in supporting that country's stand against communism.

New Zealand contributed six frigates, several smaller craft and a 1,044 strong volunteer force (known as K-FORCE) to the Korean War. The ships were under the command of a British flag officer and formed part of the US Navy screening force during the Battle of Inchon, performing shore raids and inland bombardment. New Zealand troops remained in Korea in significant numbers for four years after the 1953 armistice, although the last New Zealand soldiers did not leave until 1957 and a single liaison officer remained until 1971. A total of 3,794 New Zealand soldiers served in K-FORCE and 1,300 in the Navy deployment.

After some debate, on 26 July 1950, the New Zealand Government announced it would raise a volunteer military force to serve with UN forces in Korea. The government raised what was known as "Kayforce" (K-Force), a total of 1,044 men selected from among volunteers. An artillery regiment and support elements arrived later during the conflict from New Zealand. The force arrived at Pusan on New Year's Eve and on 21 January joined the British 27th Infantry Brigade. The New Zealanders immediately saw combat and spent the next two and a half years taking part in the operations which led the UN forces back to and over the 38th Parallel, recapturing Seoul in the process. A total of 33 New Zealanders were killed in action, 79 wounded and 1 soldier was taken prisoner. That prisoner was held in North Korea for eighteen months and repatriated after the armistices. A New Zealander flying with the Royal Air Force was also captured when he was shot down near P'yongyang, and was repatriated at around the same time.

The New Zealand-DPRK Society established in 1973 by Don Borrie and Wolf Rosenberg has played an important role in promoting relations. Before official relations its activities included helping organise DPRK delegation visits (as in 1974 and 1978) and visits to the North, such as by the Whitireia Performing Arts Group (1993). Members of the Society also have visited the North often. Since the 2001 establishment of diplomatic relations the group has continued to actively facilitate and promote contact. For instance, it has helped organise DPRK delegation visits and New Zealand visits to the North in recent years. The Secretary is Peter Wilson. An agriculturalist who worked in North Korea with the International Fund for Agricultural Development(IFAD) in 1998 and 2007 and has visited a further six times in his capacity as Secretary of the NZ DPRK Society. According to Wilson in May 2025, "Of all the North Korea friendship and solidarity groups scattered around the world, the NZ DPRK Society holds the distinction of having facilitated more projects in the country than any other association or group." The Chair of the Society is Tim Beal. Others who actively promote interaction with the DPRK include Rev Dr Stuart Vogel of the Presbyterian Church of Aotearoa-New Zealand and Rev Richard Lawrence of the Waikato Institute of Technology (WINTEC) and the NZROK Friendship Society.

== 2006 North Korean nuclear test ==
The 2006 North Korean nuclear test was the detonation of a nuclear device conducted on 9 October 2006 by North Korea. New Zealand Prime Minister Helen Clark urged the UN to bring its full weight to bear on North Korea after it announced it had conducted the underground nuclear test. Clark condemned the test, Clark also said "it will back whatever measures the U.N. Security Council decides on". Winston Peters, the Foreign Minister of New Zealand, condemned North Korea's missile tests on behalf of his government, describing them as showing "wanton disregard" for the warnings issued beforehand by the international community. He expressed his hope that North Korea would "step back now from taking any more rash steps" and resume negotiations.

== Trade ==
There has been no trade between the two countries in recent years, although some exported products from New Zealand reach North Korea via China. This lack of trade from any country over UN trade sanctions on North Korea is the main contributing factor to the crippled North Korean economy.

== Official visits ==
New Zealand's Foreign Affairs Minister Winston Peters took a trip to Pyongyang on 20 November 2007. The Foreign Affairs Minister had talks with President Kim Yong-nam in his two-day visit. Areas of in which New Zealand is looking to co-operate in could include agriculture, training and conservation. The lack of trade with the UN-sanctioned state has led to the vast poverty-stricken regions in North Korea, resulting in almost NZD$8.5 million of aid to various organizations that assist in the development of farming regions and humanitarian assistance.

== Other visits ==
In October 2005, Charlotte Glennie visited North Korea and became the first New Zealand journalist to film there officially.

In September 2011, Benjamin Evans traveled with a special needs student, Johann Landkroon (and parents) to North Korea for the 17th ITF Taekwon-Do World Championships. It is the first time that a Taekwon-Do special needs student has demonstrated at an ITF world championship. Evans was granted a request, and presented with a rare Kim Il-sung lapel badge.

In April 2012, Karim Dickie revisited Pyongyang under invite by the Korean Committee for Cultural Relations with Foreign Countries (CCRFC). He appeared on behalf of the New Zealand Preparatory Committee, "representing all New Zealanders ... looking forward to friendship with [the] Korean people." – Pak Kyong-il, Chairman Korea New Zealand Friendship Society. During his visit, Dickie met government officials including Kim Jong-suk, Chairwoman of the Korean Committee for Cultural Relations with Foreign Countries; Kim Jin-bom, Vice-chairman of the Korean Committee for Cultural Relations with Foreign Countries & Vice-chairman of the Korean Committee for Solidarity with World People; Presidium Member Pak Yong-gun; and Dickie also made a courtesy call to President Kim Yong-nam, the Chairman of the Presidium of the Supreme People's Assembly at the Mansudae Assembly Hall. Dickie runs DPR-Korea New Zealand, an NGO which promotes diplomatic and cultural relations, economic growth, understanding, and friendship between North Korea and New Zealand. He has visited North Korea twice.

== Diplomatic missions ==
New Zealand has a non resident ambassador in Seoul. North Korea has a non resident ambassador in Jakarta.

== See also ==
- Foreign relations of New Zealand
- Foreign relations of North Korea
