= New Zealand–Niue relations =

Bilateral relations between New Zealand and Niue

- New Zealand: Niue

Diplomatic mission
- New Zealand High Commission to Niue: High Commission for Niue

New Zealand–Niue relations are the bilateral relations between New Zealand and Niue. Since 1974, Niue has been a self-governing territory in free association with New Zealand.

== Diplomatic relations ==
Niue is a self-governing state in free association with New Zealand. Under the Niue Constitution Act 1974, New Zealand provides economic and administrative assistance to Niue, along with assistance with foreign affairs, defence and security at the request of the Niuean government. As part of the Realm of New Zealand, Niue shares the same head of state in the form of the Monarch of New Zealand.

New Zealand maintains a high commission in Niue while Niue maintains a high commission in Wellington.

== History ==
On 11 June 1901, Niue was incorporated along with the Cook Islands into the Realm of New Zealand. During the First World War, hundreds of Niueans served in the Niuean contingent of the New Zealand (Māori) Pioneer Battalion, which served in Egypt and the Western Front in France. By late May 1916, 82% of the Niuean contingent had experienced illness due to the colder climate and were subsequently repatriated to New Zealand via England.

In 1974, Niue entered into a free association agreement with New Zealand which accorded it significant autonomy. New Zealand would remain responsible for economic and administrative assistance, along with foreign affairs, defence and security.

On 2 August 1993, New Zealand established diplomatic relations with Niue.

On 5 June 2024, New Zealand Prime Minister Christopher Luxon visited Niuean Premier Dalton Tagelagi. During the visit, Luxon announced an agreement to enhance the free association relationship between the two countries and that New Zealand would invest NZ$20.5 million into a new large-scale renewable energy project on Niue. During the visit, the two leaders discussed Niue's proposed constitutional changes, geopolitics, Niue's NZ$15 million budgetary deficit and power outages.
