= New Zealand–South Korea relations =

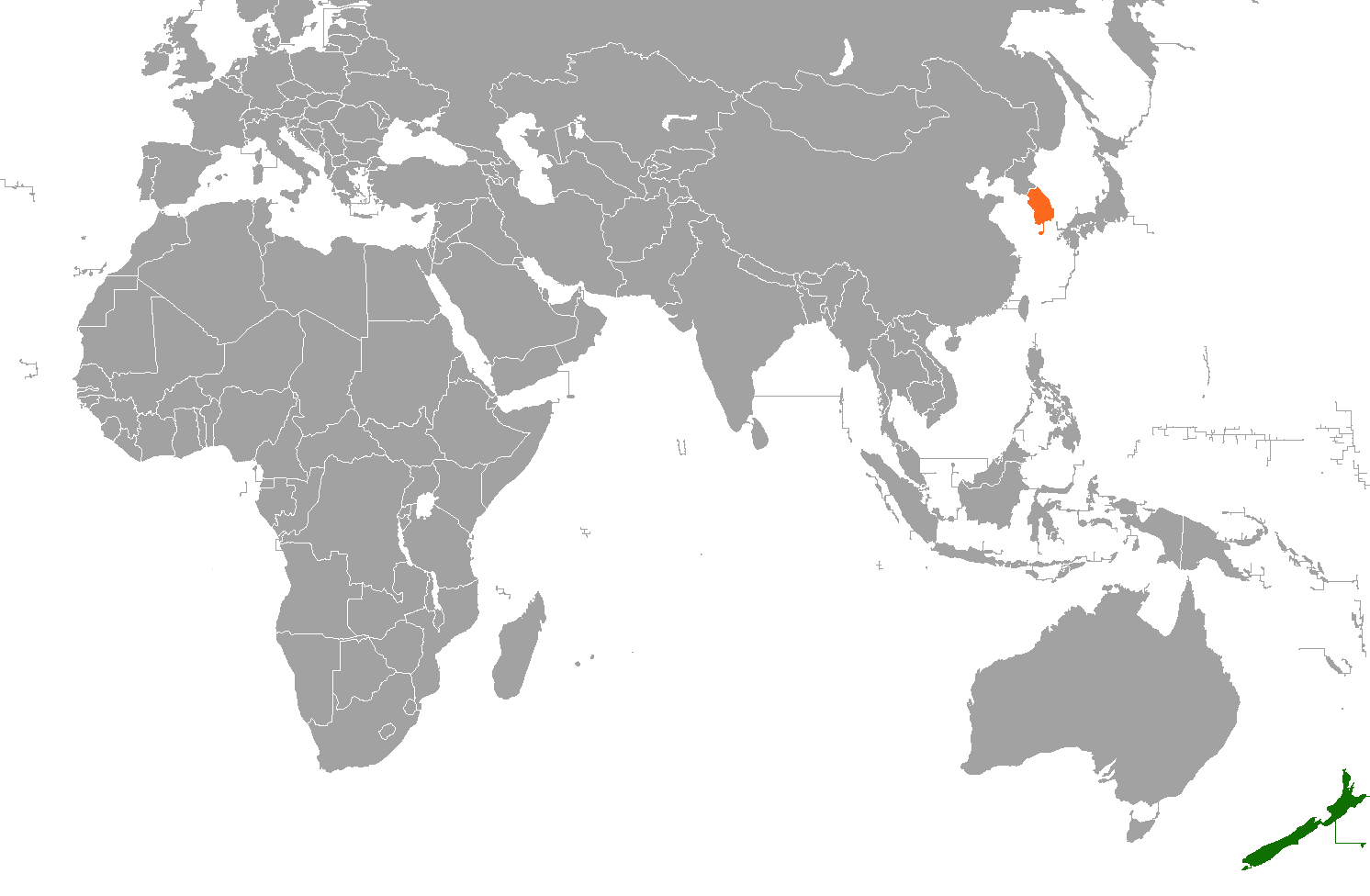

- New Zealand: South Korea

New Zealand–South Korea relations (Korean: 뉴질랜드-한국 관계; RR: Nyujillaendeu-Hangug Gwangye) are the bilateral relations between New Zealand and South Korea.

New Zealand established diplomatic relations with the Republic of Korea, also known as South Korea in 1962. South Korea has an embassy in Wellington, whereas New Zealand has an embassy in Seoul. There are many high level visits between the two countries, as well as extensive cooperation in film, science and technology and education.

== During the Korean war ==
Between 1950 and 1957, New Zealand was involved in the Korean war. About 4700 New Zealanders served under UN command, and 1300 served during the war and after the Armistice. 45 New Zealanders lost their lives.

== Current relation ==
Former South Korean president, Lee Myung Bak visited New Zealand in 2009. In 2018, minister of finance Grant Robertson visited South Korea and has met with South Korean deputy finance minister Koh Hyeong Kwon. During the meeting, the South Korean finance ministry announced that Korean firms will participate in New Zealand's infrastructure project. In 2014, speaker of the national assembly Kang-Chang Hee led a delegation of assembly members to meet with prime minister John Key, speaker David Carter and members of the New Zealand-Korea friendship group. A free trade agreement between the two countries was signed by prime minister John Key and trade minister Tim Groser in 2015.

== Trade ==
South Korea is New Zealand's seventh-largest trading partner, with bilateral trade between the two countries in 2017-18 valued at NZ$4.75 billion (approximately ₩3.73 trillion). New Zealand's main exports to South Korea are wood, dairy products, meat, and aluminium. South Korea's main exports to New Zealand are petroleum, vehicles, machinery, iron and steel, and plastic.

	2019	2022
New Zealand to South Korea	$1.8B	$1.7B
South Korea to New Zealand	$2.4B	$3.5B

== Immigration ==
There are some 26,601 Koreans living in New Zealand. Most Koreans in New Zealand are Christians with a small minority of Buddhists. Korean community schools in major cities offer Korean language classes.

== Resident diplomatic missions ==
- New Zealand has an embassy in Seoul.
- South Korea has an embassy in Wellington.

== See also ==
- Foreign relations of New Zealand
- Foreign relations of South Korea
  - Indo-Pacific Strategy of South Korea
- Korean New Zealanders
