= New Zealand–Singapore relations =

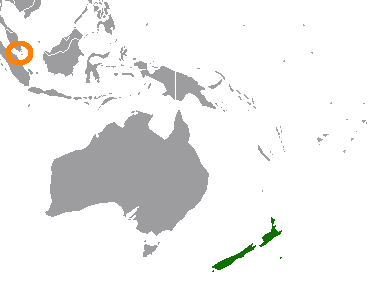

- New Zealand: Singapore

New Zealand–Singapore relations are the bilateral relations between the Republic of Singapore and New Zealand. Singapore has a high commission in Wellington, and New Zealand has a high commission in Singapore. Both countries are members of the Commonwealth of Nations, Asia Pacific Economic Cooperation (APEC), and the Five Power Defence Arrangements pact. Relations between the two countries are warm and cordial.

== History ==
New Zealand and Singapore established bilateral relations in 1965, with New Zealand being among the first countries to recognise Singapore's independence. From 1974 to 1989, the New Zealand Force South East Asia maintained a joint military base in Singapore.

== Economic relations ==
Singapore is New Zealand's fifth-largest trading partner, with NZ$6.56 billion (S$6.08 billion) in two-way trade in 2021.

With the decommissioning of the oil refinery at Marsden Point in 2022, New Zealand transitioned to a 100% import model for refined petroleum, establishing Singapore as its primary supplier. This dependency became critical during the 2026 Strait of Hormuz crisis. To mitigate the resulting supply volatility and record-high fuel prices in New Zealand, the country leveraged the Singapore–New Zealand Comprehensive Strategic Partnership (CSP) to prioritise the Agreement on Trade in Essential Supplies. This bilateral framework ensures that New Zealand maintains access to Singapore's refining capacity and strategic fuel exports. On 4 May, New Zealand Prime Minister Christopher Luxon and Singaporean Prime Minister Lawrence Wong signed a "fuel for food" agreement to ensure a steady supply of essential goods such as food, fuel, construction materials and medicines between the two countries.
