= New Zealand–Papua New Guinea relations =

- New Zealand: Papua New Guinea

Diplomatic mission
- New Zealand High Commission to Papua New Guinea: High Commission of the Independent State of Papua New Guinea

New Zealand–Papua New Guinea relations refers to the diplomatic relations between New Zealand and the Independent State of Papua New Guinea. Both nations are members of the Commonwealth of Nations, the Pacific Islands Forum and the United Nations.

== History ==
New Zealand and Papua New Guinea are two Pacific Islands states with a common history in the fact that New Zealand and the Territory of Papua were colonized by the United Kingdom (while Germany administered German New Guinea). During World War II, New Zealand soldiers fought in the Battle of the Green Islands. In 1949, Australia established a joint administration over both territories called the Territory of Papua and New Guinea. In September 1975, Papua New Guinea obtained independence from Australia. Soon afterwards, New Zealand recognized and established diplomatic relations with Papua New Guinea.

In December 1988, the Bougainville Civil War erupted in the Autonomous Region of Bougainville when a group calling itself the Bougainville Revolutionary Army (BRA) led a movement for secession by the island from Papua New Guinea. New Zealand played a role by hosting Papua New Guinean government officials and separatists for peace talks. In October 1997, following talks in Christchurch, a truce was signed between the new government and many of the Bougainville separatists. An unarmed Truce Monitoring Group (TMG) led by New Zealand and supported by Australia, Fiji and Vanuatu was subsequently deployed. In January 1998 the Lincoln Agreement was signed and New Zealand was witness to the 2001 Bougainville Peace Agreement which ended the conflict.

New Zealand and Papua New Guinea are active members of the Pacific Islands Forum. There have been numerous visits by leaders of both nations with recent visits including New Zealand Prime Minister Jacinda Ardern visiting Port Moresby in November 2018 to attend the 30th APEC summit. In February 2020, Papua New Guinean Prime Minister James Marape paid a four-day state visit to New Zealand.

Since 2001, Papua New Guinea has been host to the Manus Regional Processing Centre on Manus Island established by Australia as a Pacific Solution aimed at stopping maritime arrivals of asylum seekers to Australia. In recent years, New Zealand has offered to take refugees who had been stuck on Manus Island. The New Zealand and Papua New Guinea governments wanted this offer to materialize, however, Australia wouldn't allow it, warning it could create an incentive for future asylum seekers to get in to Australia through a back door.

In 2021, New Zealand Prime Minister Jacinda Ardern signed a partnership agreement with Papuan Prime Minister James Marape. In late March 2025, New Zealand Prime Minister Christopher Luxon signed a second partnership agreement with Marape, marking 50 years of bilateral relations between the two countries. This agreement was signed in Wellington and focused on bilateral cooperation in education, trade, security, agriculture and fisheries.

In July 2026, the Papuan and New Zealand Defence Ministers Elias Kapavore and Chris Penk signed a statement of intent to boost bilateral defence cooperation between the two countries in Port Moresby. Key provisions include Papua New Guinea seeking support from the Pacific Islands Forum in times of crises, expanding joint maritime cooperation, defence dialogue, training exercises, and military exchanges.

== Trade ==
In 2018, trade between both nations totaled NZ$257 million dollars. New Zealand's main exports to Papua New Guinea include: electrical machinery and equipment, meat products, dairy produce and animal products. Papua New Guinea's main exports to New Zealand include: petroleum oils, coffee, and plywood or veneered panels. Papua New Guinea is New Zealand's second largest goods export market in the Pacific (after Fiji). New Zealand's private sector is engaged in Papua New Guinea across a wide range of industries including communications, construction, aviation, engineering, energy and education.

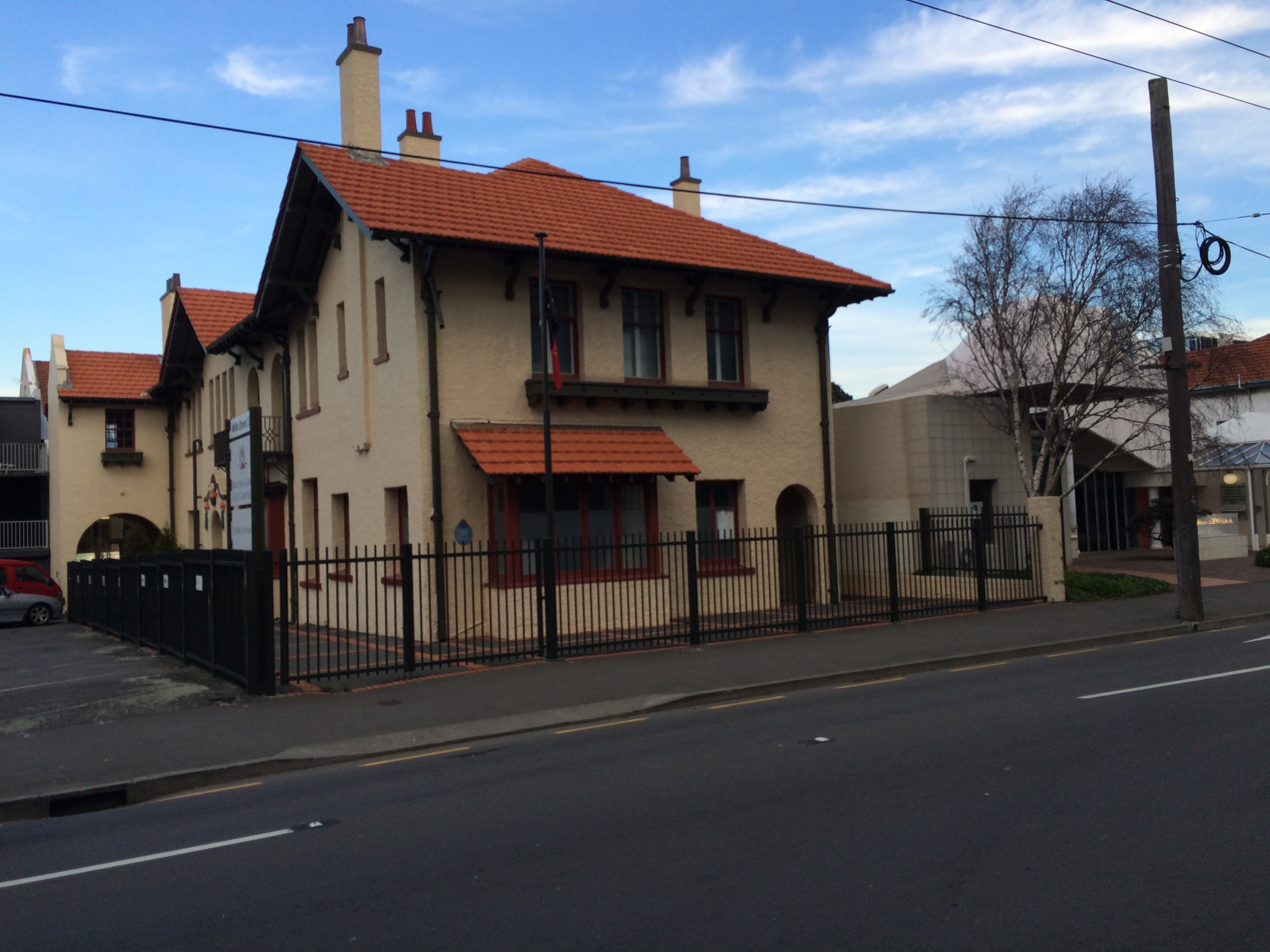
Papua New Guinean high commission in Wellington

== Resident diplomatic missions ==
- New Zealand has a high commission in Port Moresby.

- Papua New Guinea has a high commission in Wellington.

== See also ==
- Battle of the Green Islands
