= New Zealand–Thailand relations =

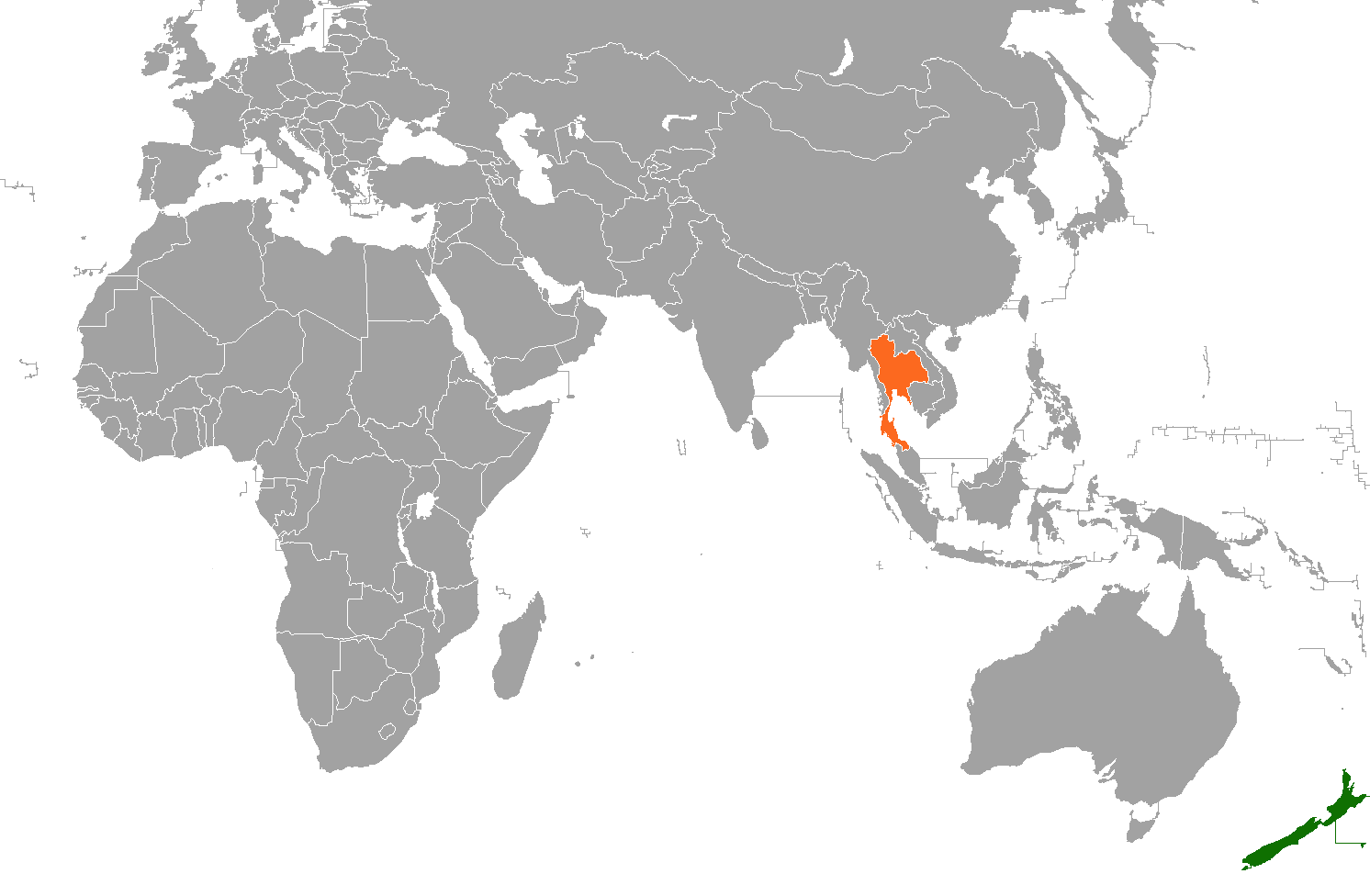

- New Zealand: Thailand

Diplomatic mission
- Embassy of New Zealand, Bangkok: Royal Thai Embassy, Wellington

Envoy
- Ambassador Jonathan Kings: Ambassador; Waravuth Pouapinya

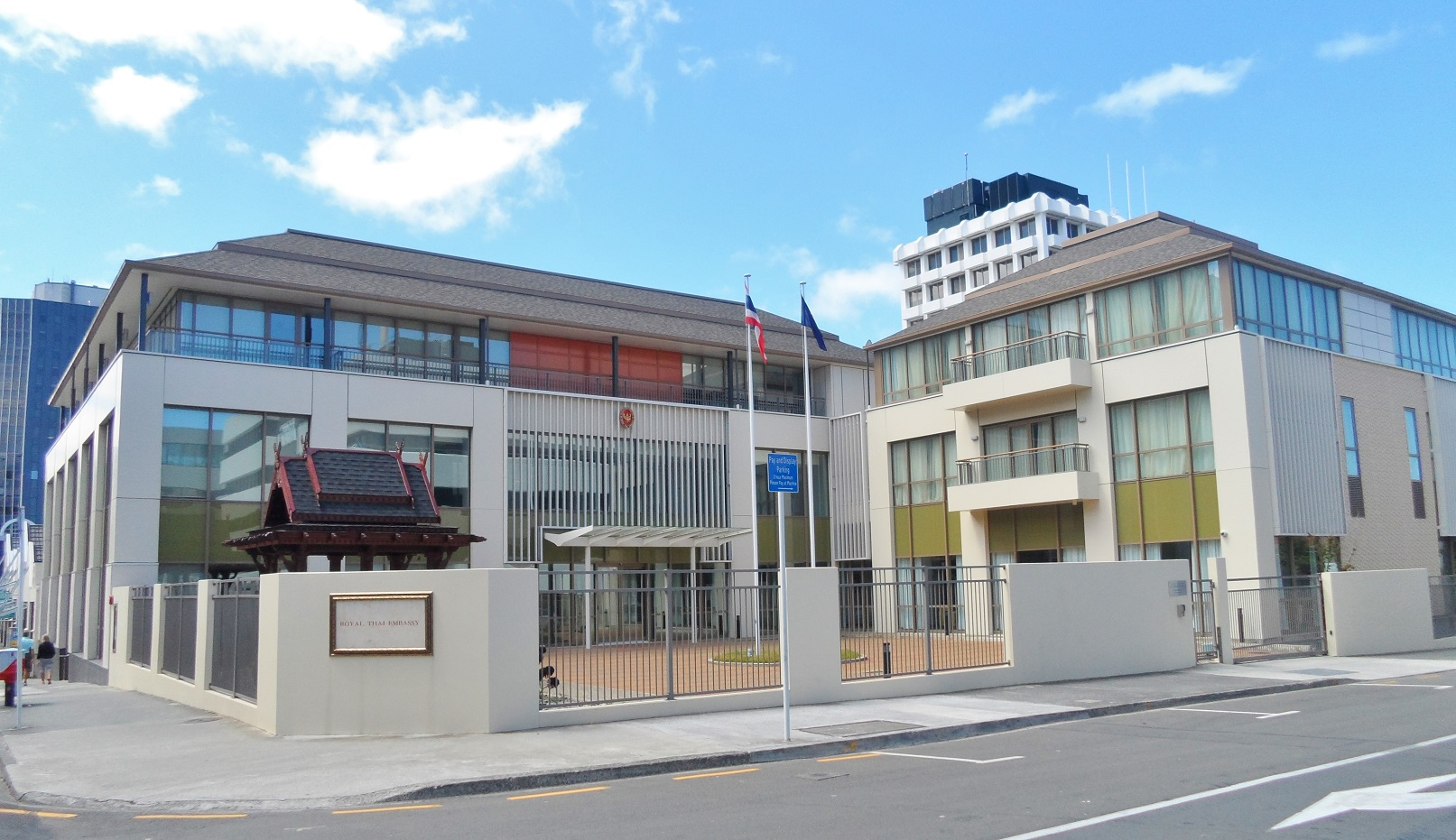
Embassy of Thailand in Wellington

New Zealand–Thailand relations refer to the bilateral relations between New Zealand and Thailand. New Zealand operates an embassy in the All Seasons Place in Bangkok, whilst Thailand operates an embassy in Wellington. The current Thai ambassador to New Zealand is Waravuth Pouapinya, and the ambassador to Thailand from New Zealand is Jonathan Kings. Both are members of the Asia-Pacific Economic Cooperation.

== History ==
The two countries established diplomatic ties in 1956.

The two countries celebrated their 60 years of diplomatic relations in 2016. There are some 10,000 Thais living in New Zealand. The Royal Thai Police has worked closely with the New Zealand Police for more than 30 years.

New Zealand upgraded relations with the Thai military government in 2016.

== Diplomacy ==
=== List of ambassadors ===
Thailand to New Zealand

Name	Photo	Appointed	Termination of mission	Comment
Asda Jayanama		1990	1993	
Waravuth Pouapinya		31 January 2023	Incumbent	
