= Denmark–New Zealand relations =

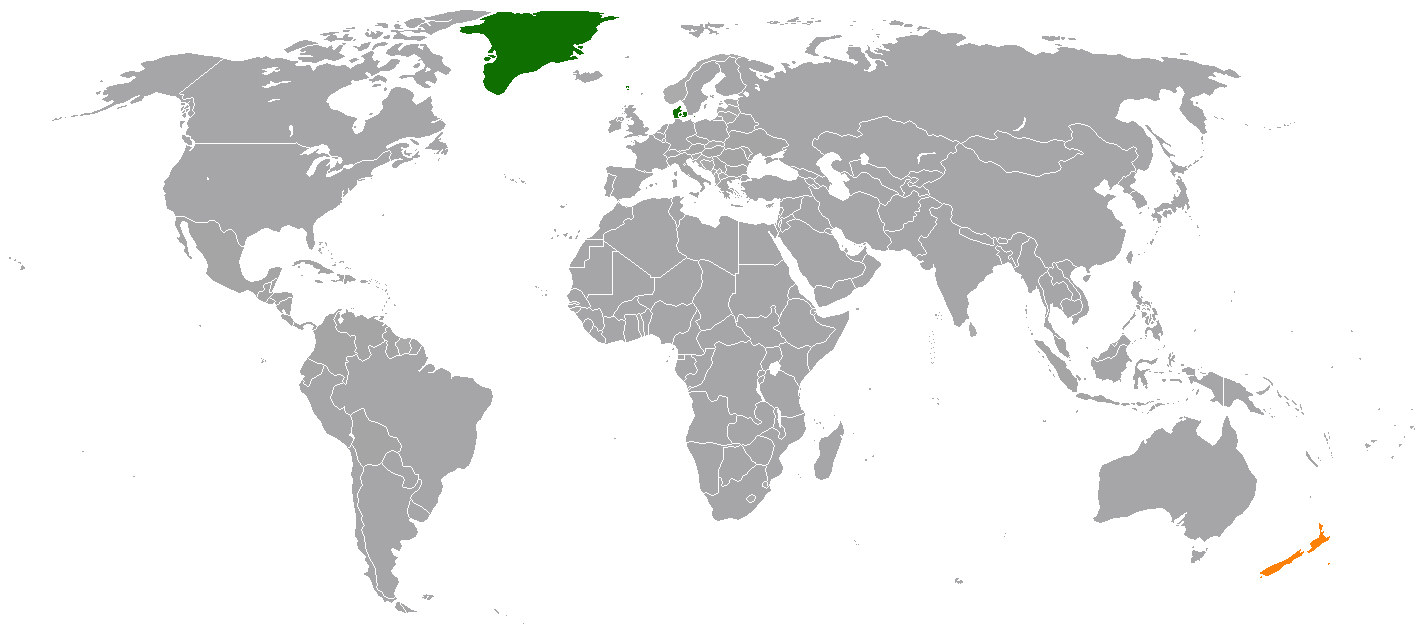

- Denmark: New Zealand

Denmark–New Zealand relations are the foreign relations between Denmark and New Zealand. As of 2021, neither country has a resident ambassador. Denmark is represented in New Zealand through its embassy in Canberra (Australia), a trade commission in Sydney, and honorary consulates in Auckland, Wellington, and Christchurch. New Zealand is represented in Denmark through its embassy in Stockholm. The New Zealand government describes relations as "good" and records a high degree of agreement on international affairs.

Both countries are full members of the OECD, and in certain contexts ally themselves with the United States. Denmark is a 'third party' to the UK-USA Security Agreement, of which New Zealand is a member.

== History ==
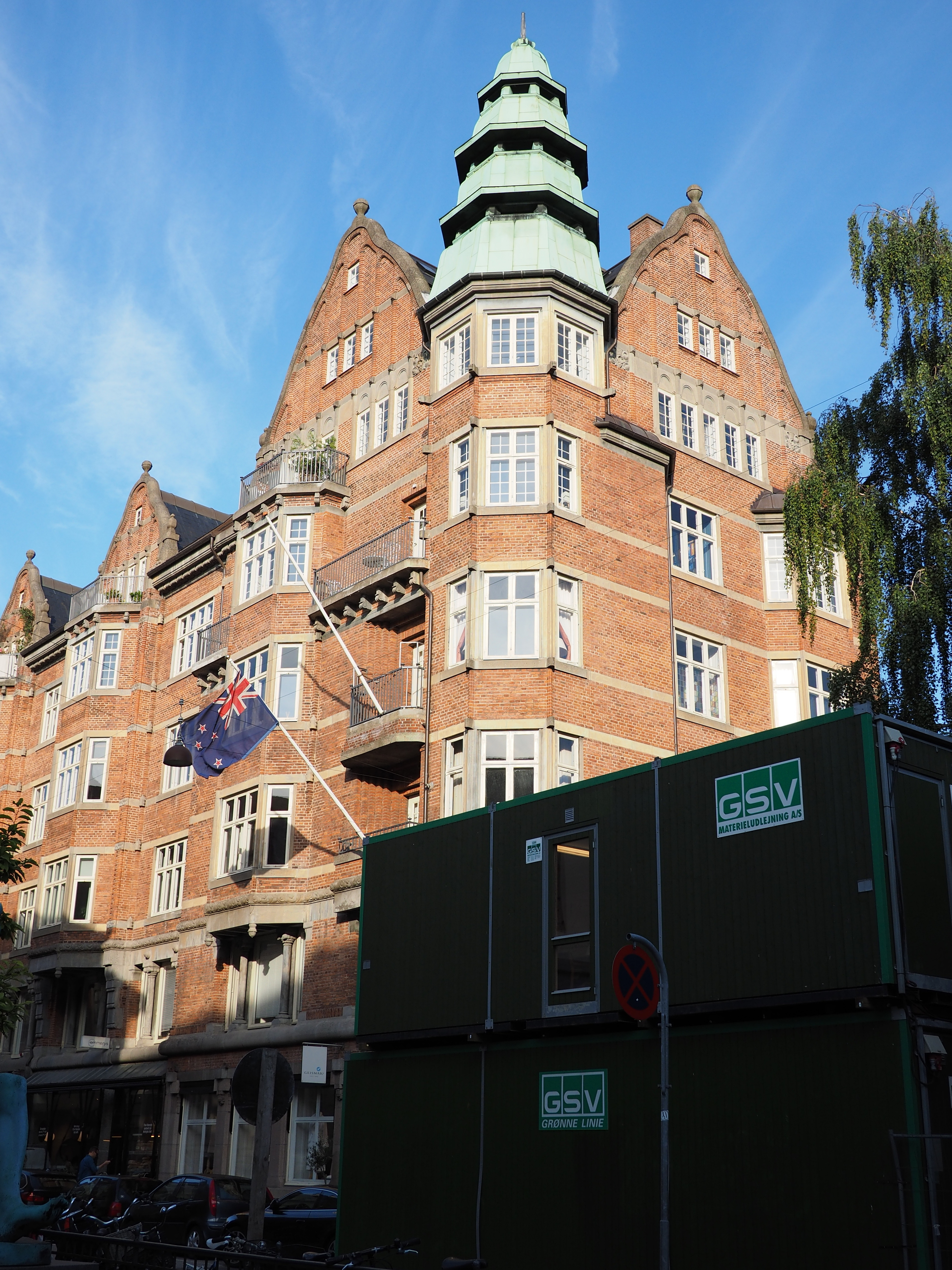
The building which houses the honorary New Zealand Consulate General in Copenhagen in 2015

There is a small Danish community in New Zealand, descended from a group of early settlers who came to clear thick North Island bush, in the middle years of the 19th century, and stayed to found settlements including Dannevirke and Norsewood. A former Prime Minister and high-ranking churchman from Denmark, Danish Prime Minister, Bishop Ditlev Gothard Monrad, settled in Karere near Palmerston North in the 1860s, and set up the first dairy plant in the region. Monrad returned to Denmark after a stay of three years, but other members of his family stayed in New Zealand. He left behind his collection of art now housed at the Museum of New Zealand Te Papa Tongarewa. Other Danes came to the Seventy Mile Bush area in 1872 and founded the town which retains the Danish name of Dannevirke, commemorating the Danevirke in Slesvig. The other town created by the Danes was Norsewood.

In 1946, the two countries signed an agreement regarding 'exchange of notes', and other property held during World War II. In 2009 Carol Stigley was appointed by the Queen of Denmark, Her Majesty Queen Margrethe II as Consul General of Denmark to New Zealand. In 2024 Karen Pullar, who was appointed Honorary Consul General - Wellington in 2015, was made a knight of the Order of the Dannebrog in recognition of her service in the interests of Denmark.

== Trade ==
Denmark and New Zealand have been major competitors in the British food-products market since the early 1900s. Denmark's desire for access to the United Kingdom's dairy market influenced the negotiations for the United Kingdom's accession to the European Economic Community in the 1970s, and thus had a substantial impact on New Zealand's economy in the following years.

== Agreements ==
The two countries have agreements covering double taxation, pensions, and other social security payments. working holidays, and air services. New Zealand has encouraged immigration of temporary workers from Denmark, and vice versa for working holidays by New Zealand citizens to Denmark.

== Bilateral visits ==
Queen Margrethe II of Denmark made an official state visit to New Zealand in February 1987. Other visits between the two nations include a November 1998 visit to New Zealand by Niels Helveg Petersen, the Danish Foreign Minister; and Phil Goff, the New Zealand Foreign Minister visiting Denmark in September 2002.

== Resident diplomatic missions ==
- Denmark is accredited to New Zealand from its embassy in Canberra, Australia.
- New Zealand is accredited to Denmark from its embassy in Stockholm, Sweden.

== See also ==
- Foreign relations of Denmark
- Foreign relations of New Zealand
