= Estonia–New Zealand relations =

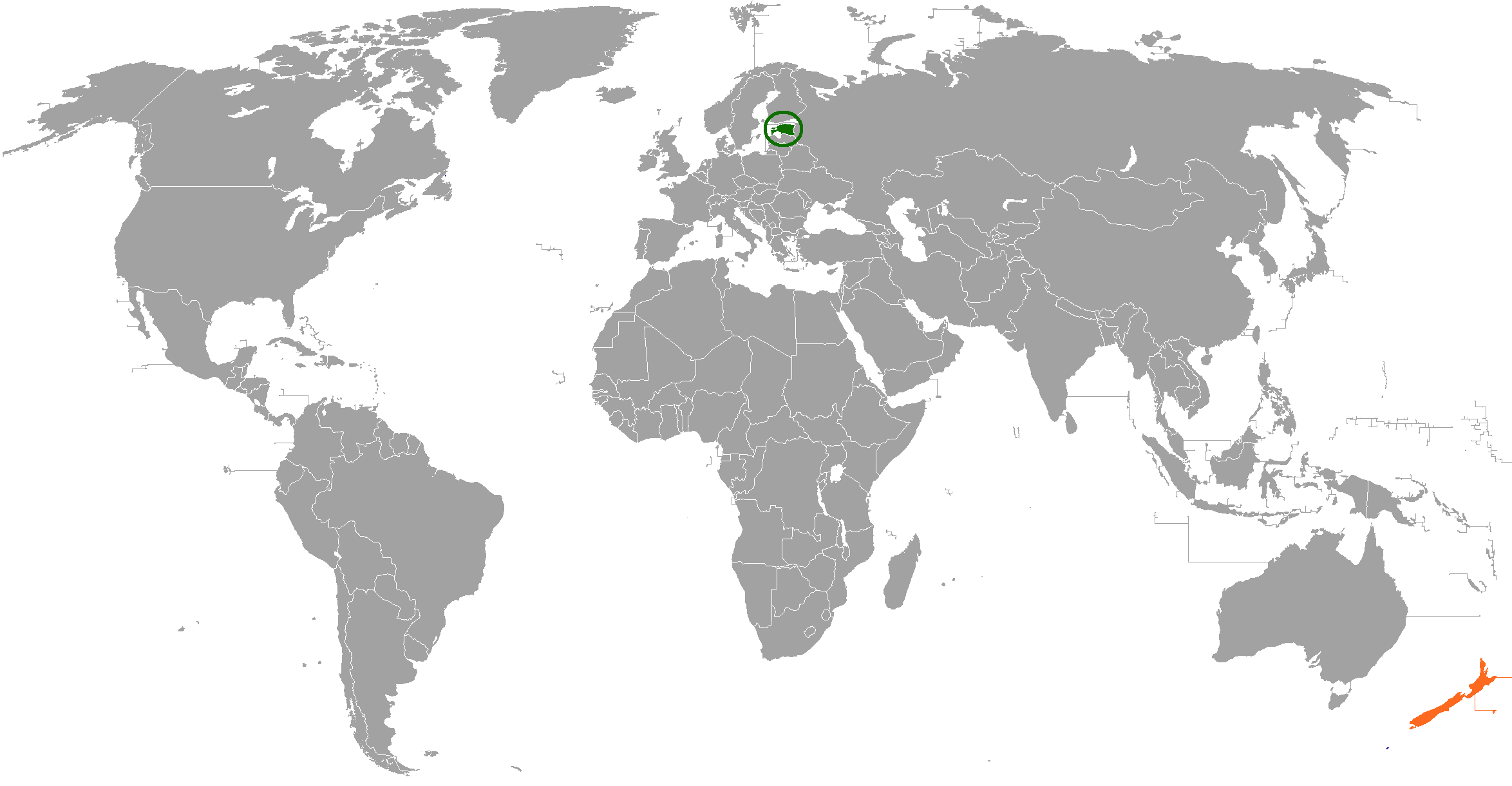

- Estonia: New Zealand

Diplomatic mission
- Estonian Embassy, Canberra, Australia: New Zealand Embassy, Warsaw, Poland

Estonia–New Zealand relations are the bilateral relations between Estonia and New Zealand.

Estonia and New Zealand maintain warm and developing relations. Although geographically distant, the two countries share common values, systems of government, and continue to co-operate in international affairs both via NATO and bilaterally. New Zealand was a destination for Estonian refugees in the aftermath of World War II and, to this day, there are thousands of people in New Zealand with connections to Estonia.

Estonian-New Zealand co-operation focuses on the areas of cyber security, education, and European Union relations. Estonia has supported New Zealand's campaigns for the United Nations Security Council and has received similar support for their own campaign.

The 20th Governor-General of New Zealand Sir Jerry Mateparae has said that the two countries share similar commitments to innovation, rule of law, democratic governance, international security, and the development of human rights. Estonia and New Zealand worked together to help ensure peace and security in Afghanistan.

According to a representative from the Estonian Ministry of Foreign Affairs in 2017, Estonia's relationship with New Zealand had improved in the preceding years.

Estonia is accredited to New Zealand from its embassy in Canberra, Australia. New Zealand is accredited to Estonia from its embassy in Warsaw, Poland.

== History ==
Bilateral relations have existed between the two countries since 1921.

New Zealand first recognised Estonia on 22 September 1921, two years after the Estonian Declaration of Independence, when Estonia joined the League of Nations. New Zealand again recognised Estonia on 28 August 1991 shortly after the dissolution of the Soviet Union and the end of the Soviet Occupation of Estonia. Diplomatic relations were then re-established on 6 January 1992.

Like Australia, New Zealand was a destination for Estonian refugees following World War II. During the aftermath of the war, people from Estonia (and other Baltic states) were preferred by the New Zealand government over displaced persons from other countries. Between 1945 and 1956, the number of Estonians increased from 45 to 240. Many Estonians became very successful in New Zealand. A notable example was chess player Estonian-New Zealander Ortvin Sarapuu "Mr. Chess" who represented New Zealand in 10 chess Olympiads.

Relations between Estonia and New Zealand improved upon the accession of Estonia to the EU. In 2004, Phil Goff was the first New Zealand Foreign Minister to visit Estonia. In 2006, the first bilateral treaty between New Zealand and Estonia, which established a working holiday scheme between the two countries, was signed. In 2009, Urmas Paet was the first Estonian Foreign Minister to visit New Zealand.

== Diaspora ==
As of the 2018 census, 189 Estonians were residing in New Zealand. As of the 2021 census, 28 New Zealanders were residing in Estonia.

== Areas of co-operation ==
Both nations are members of the Australia Group, and the Organisation for Economic Co-operation and Development.

Joint work between New Zealand and Estonia occurs in the areas of cyber-security and European Union-Pacific affairs. Through their status as a NATO partner country, New Zealand works closely with Estonia on cyber-security issues. In 2014, New Zealand minister Amy Adams met with the NATO Cooperative Cyber Defence Centre in Tallinn.

Estonia has sought to improve European and Pacific relations. Estonian Ministry of Foreign Affairs representative Rainer Saks attended a meeting of the Pacific Islands Forum along with New Zealand and other Pacific nations.

There have also been discussions between education ministries on what New Zealand could learn from Estonia's progress in lifting educational achievement.

== Trade ==
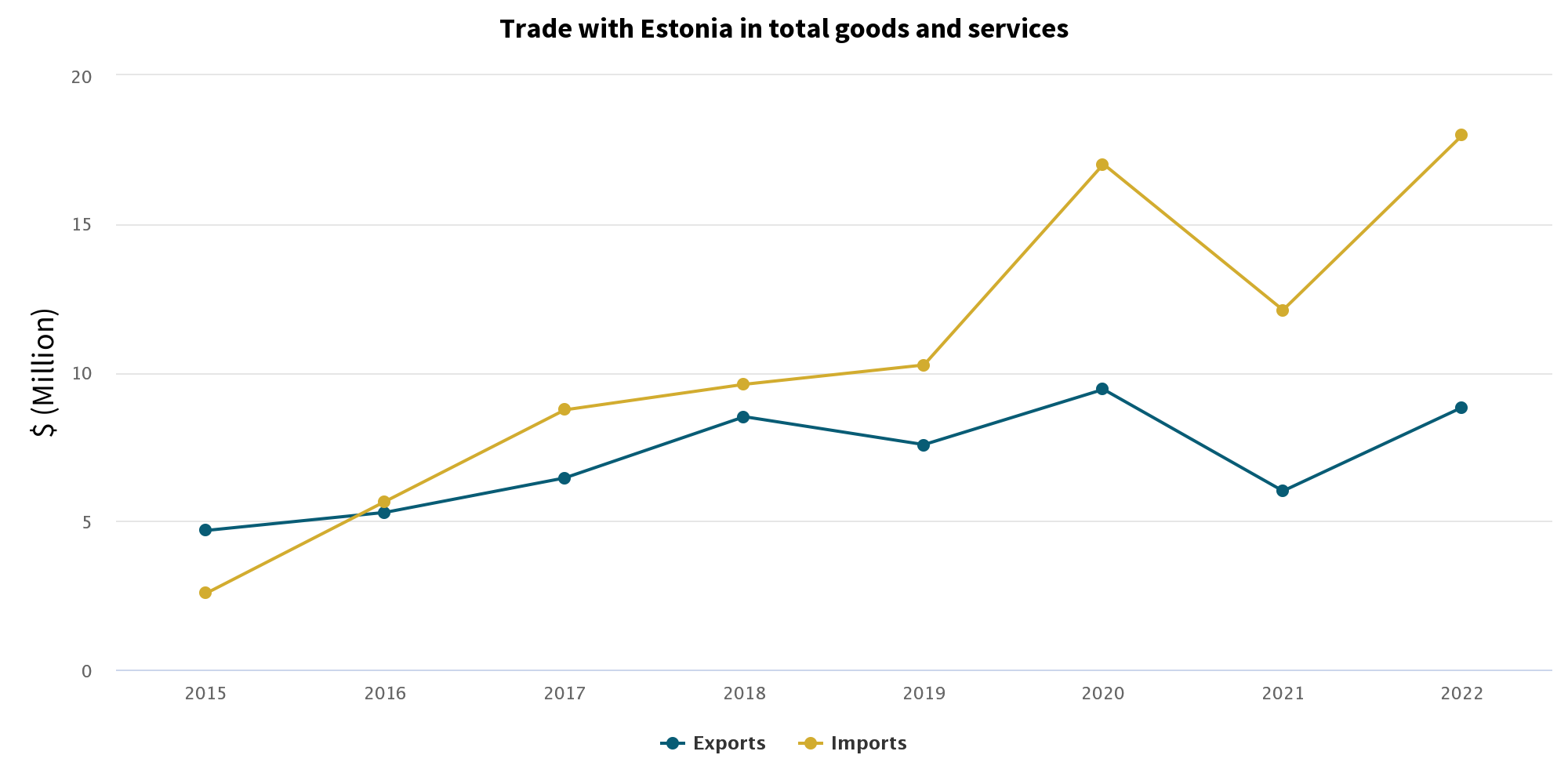
New Zealand exports to Estonia and imports from Estonia from 2015 to 2022 in New Zealand dollars

For the year ended March 2022, New Zealand exports to Estonia totalled US$5.7 million and Estonian exports to New Zealand totalled US$11.69 million. Notably, while Estonia produces a high proportion of consumed meat domestically, significant imports of lamb and mutton come from New Zealand. Trade between the two nations has grown markedly since 2015, with the sum value of imports and exports increasing over 370% from US$4.69 million in 2015 to US$17.38 million in 2022.

Trade relations between the two countries are governed by the EU's Common Commercial Policy.

== Tourism ==
Visitor numbers between the two countries remain modest. Travel between the two countries increased in the two decades following Estonia's EU membership.

In 2000, Statistics New Zealand recorded exactly zero visits by New Zealanders to Estonia. In 2005, one year after Estonia's EU membership, 50 visits were recorded. By 2019, this number had risen to 256 annual visits.

It is far more common for Estonians to visit New Zealand than vice versa and the number of visits has grown. In 2000, just 30 visits were recorded. By 2005, this had increased to 253. By 2019, this had risen to 793 visits.

Out of the Baltic states, Estonia is the most popular tourism destination for New Zealanders. Similarly, the most common visitor to New Zealand from a Baltic state is an Estonian citizen.

== Agreements ==
In 2007, a working holiday scheme was established between Estonia and New Zealand. This allows New Zealand and Estonian citizens aged 18–30 to stay and work in the other country for up to 12 months. New Zealand issues up to 100 visas per year and there is no cap on the number of visas issued by Estonia. This agreement came into force on 5 November 2007. Three other countries (Australia, Canada, and Japan) have similar agreements with Estonia.

In the first year of the program, 34 visas were issued to Estonian citizens. Visa issuance steadily increased from 2007 to 2011 and in every year except 2020 and 2021, the maximum number of visas were issued.

== Trivia ==
In 2010, there was a minor controversy surrounding inappropriate ministerial expenses by Foreign Minister Winston Peters on his 2006 visit to Estonia. An Official Information Act request revealed that he had made multiple personal purchases on diplomatic trips. One such expense was at the Reval Hotel Olümpia, where Peters, an avid smoker, received a €127.82 fine for 'a bed cover being burnt by cigarette'.

The two major parties of New Zealand, the Labour Party as well as Prime Minister Christopher Luxon of the National Party, have mentioned Estonia as a model country for New Zealand.

== Official visits ==
Estonia-New Zealand Official Visits
Dates	Minister/Delegate	Location	Reason
October 2018	President Kersti Kaljulaid	Auckland, New Zealand	To meet with Jacinda Ardern and discuss e-governance, statistics gathering, climate change, and UN Security Council issues.
October 2018	Minister for Government Digital Services Megan Woods	Tallinn, Estonia	To attend the Tallinn Digital Summit
March 2016	Minister for Education Hekia Parata	Tallinn, Estonia	To meet with Estonian Education and Research Minister Jürgen Ligi to learn about Estonia's progress in lifting educational achievement.
March 2016	Foreign Minister Marina Kaljurand	New Zealand	A joint delegation with the Finnish foreign minister and Estonian entrepreneurs
July 2015	Foreign Minister Todd McClay	Tallinn, Estonia	To discuss relations between the two countries and the ongoing situation in Ukraine.
April 2014	Minister for Communications Amy Adams	Tallinn, Estonia	To visit the NATO Cyber Defense Center after the beginning of the Russo-Ukrainian War
April 2010	Foreign Minister Murray McCully	Tallinn, Estonia	To discuss co-operation between the two countries and the impact of the 2008 financial crisis
April 2009	Foreign Minister Urmas Paet	Wellington, New Zealand	To open the first Estonian Honorary Consulate in New Zealand.
September 2006	Foreign Minister Winston Peters	Tallinn, Estonia	To sign the Arrangement on a Working Holiday Scheme between the Government of the Republic of Estonia and the Government of New Zealand.
April 2004	Speaker of the House Jonathan Hunt	Estonia	-
September 2004	Foreign Minister Phil Goff	Estonia	To visit Estonia after their recent accession to the EU.

== See also ==
- Foreign relations of Estonia
- Foreign relations of New Zealand
