= Reuel Lochore =

New Zealand public servant, diplomat, scholar, and philologist

- Lochore, c. 1930

1st Ambassador of New Zealand to West Germany
- In office 1966–1969
- Succeeded by: Doug Zohrab

Personal details
- Born: Reuel Anson Lochore; 25 February 1903
- Died: 22 August 1991 (aged 88)
- Spouse: Dorothy Davies (m. 1940; died 1987)
- Occupation: Public servant; diplomat

Reuel Anson Lochore (25 February 1903 – 22 August 1991) was a New Zealand public servant, diplomat, scholar, and philologist.

== Biography ==
Lochore was born on 25 February 1903. He was the son of a Methodist minister and a teacher of the deaf. He studied English, French, Latin, philosophy and psychology at Auckland University College and also taught at a college in Wellington. From his adolescence, Lochore admired the German language and culture.

In 1930, Lochore moved to Germany where he became a university student. He studied at the Institute for Foreigners in Berlin and later pursued a PhD in Romance languages and literature at the University of Bonn. During his time in Germany, Lochore witnessed the rise of the Nazi Party. During the interwar period, he sought to promote friendly relations between New Zealand and Germany. He attempted to promote a trade agreement between the two countries but this initiative failed due to vocal trade union opposition in New Zealand and a lack of public interest in trade with Germany. In 1938, Lochore defended a controversial visit to New Zealand by Felix von Luckner, a German commercial raider who had targeted Allied shipping in the South Pacific during World War I.

In 1940, Lochore married Dorothy Davies (1899–1987), a piano teacher; the couple adopted a son and fostered other children.

During World War II, Lochore worked as the director for language services at the Department of Internal Affairs and was given the job of screening immigrants to New Zealand including Jewish refugees fleeing Nazi-occupied Europe.

Owing to his connections to the first National Party Prime Minister Sidney Holland, Lochore worked at various diplomatic postings in Asia including Malaya and Indonesia. In 1950, he published a book called From Europe to New Zealand, which became a guide for helping the Government to screen non-British migrants. While Lochore favoured importing Scandinavian and Dutch immigrants to supplement British and Irish immigrants, he discouraged Italian, Greek, Yugoslavian, Jewish, and Asian immigration to New Zealand. He was also opposed to settlement by Eurasians from the former Netherlands East Indies (modern-day Indonesia).

In 1959, Lochore was appointed as the first secretary to Charles Bennett, the New Zealand high commissioner to Malaya and one of the first Māori officials at the New Zealand Department of External Affairs. Between 1964 and 1966, Lochore also served as the New Zealand minister to Indonesia. During his time in Indonesia, he witnessed the 30 September coup attempt and the rise of Suharto's New Order. In 1966, Lochore was appointed as New Zealand's first ambassador to West Germany.

In 1980, Lochore alleged during a Parliamentary committee that at least 15 Soviet agents had operated in several government departments including the Ministries of Foreign Affairs, Trade and Industry, Defence, Justice and Health.

Lochore died on 22 August 1991, at the age of 88, and was buried at North Shore Memorial Park in the Auckland suburb of Schnapper Rock. He had been predeceased by his wife, Dorothy Davies, in 1987.

== Controversy ==
Lochore's attitude to Nazi Germany has been the subject of controversy: businessman Frederick Turnovsky and journalist Nicholas Boyack wrote that Lochore was a Nazi sympathiser who held antisemitic views. Historian Michael King (a friend of Lochore and his wife Dorothy) disputed these criticisms, stating that Lochore was "at worst, a voluble and volatile eccentric of conservative inclination."
