= 1954 New Year Honours (New Zealand) =

Annual awards for New Zealanders

The 1954 New Year Honours in New Zealand were appointments by Elizabeth II on the advice of the New Zealand government to various orders and honours to reward and highlight good works by New Zealanders. The awards celebrated the passing of 1953 and the beginning of 1954, and were announced on 1 January 1954.

The recipients of honours are displayed here as they were styled before their new honour.

== Knight Bachelor ==
- John Moody Albert Ilott – of Wellington. For public and philanthropic services.

== Order of Saint Michael and Saint George ==
=== Knight Commander (KCMG) ===
- The Honourable Harold Eric Barrowclough CB DSO MC ED – Chief Justice.
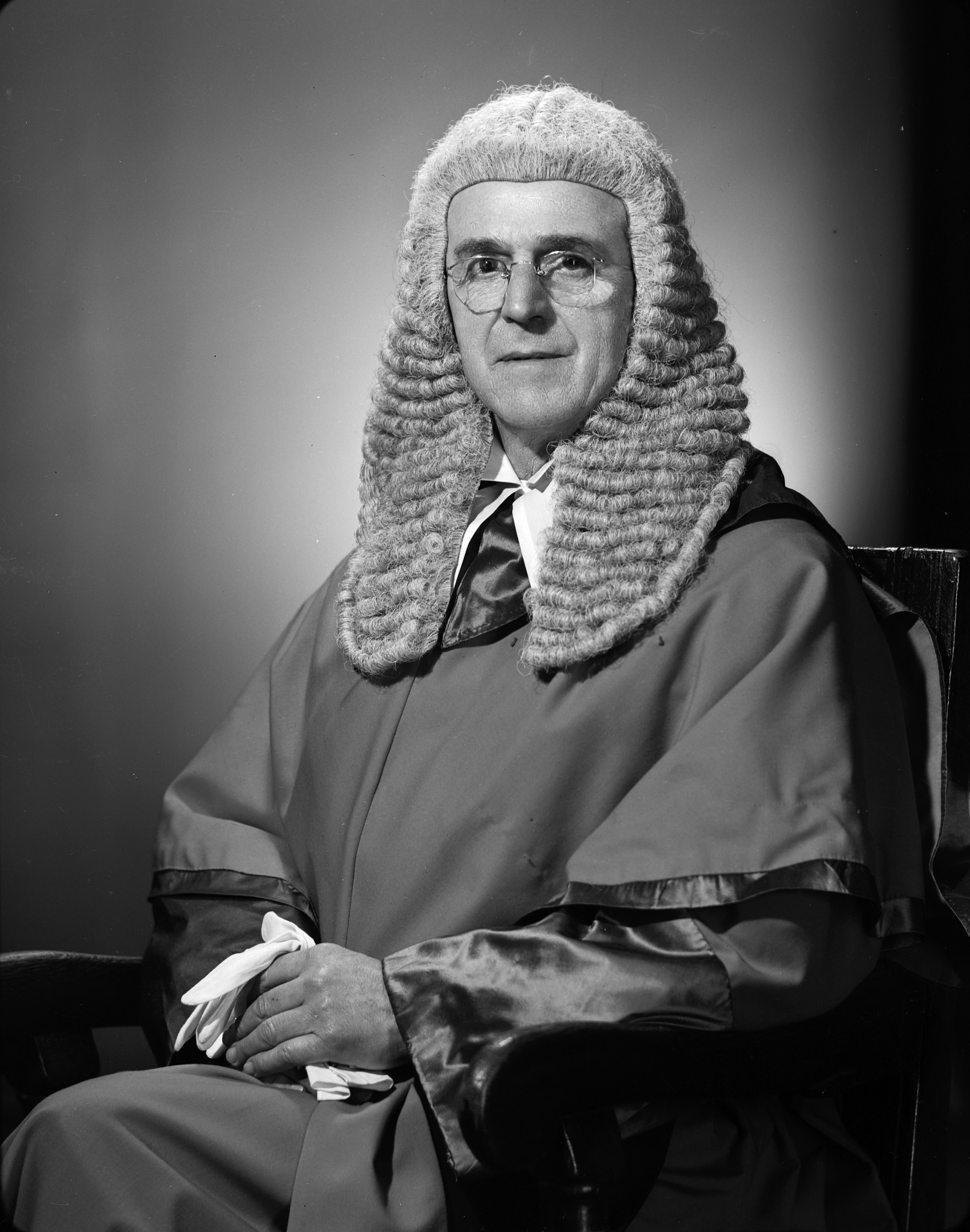
Sir Harold Barrowclough

=== Companion (CMG) ===
- George Edwin Lisle Alderton – high commissioner for New Zealand in the Commonwealth of Australia.
- Guy Richardson Powles – high commissioner of Western Samoa.

== Order of the British Empire ==
=== Commander (CBE) ===
Civil division

- Thomas Abram Barrow JP – lately Air Secretary.
- George Lyttelton Laurenson – Commissioner of Transport.
- The Right Reverend Wiremu Netana Panapa – Bishop of Aotearoa.
- William Riddet – professor of agriculture at Massey Agricultural College, Palmerston North.

Military division

- Brigadier James Russell Page DSO – New Zealand Army.
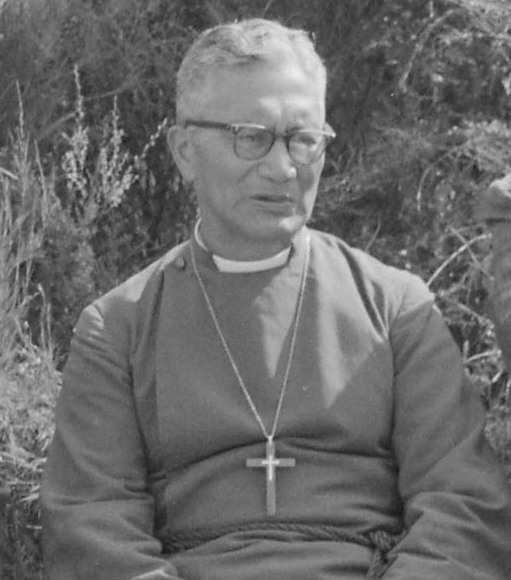
Wiremu Panapa

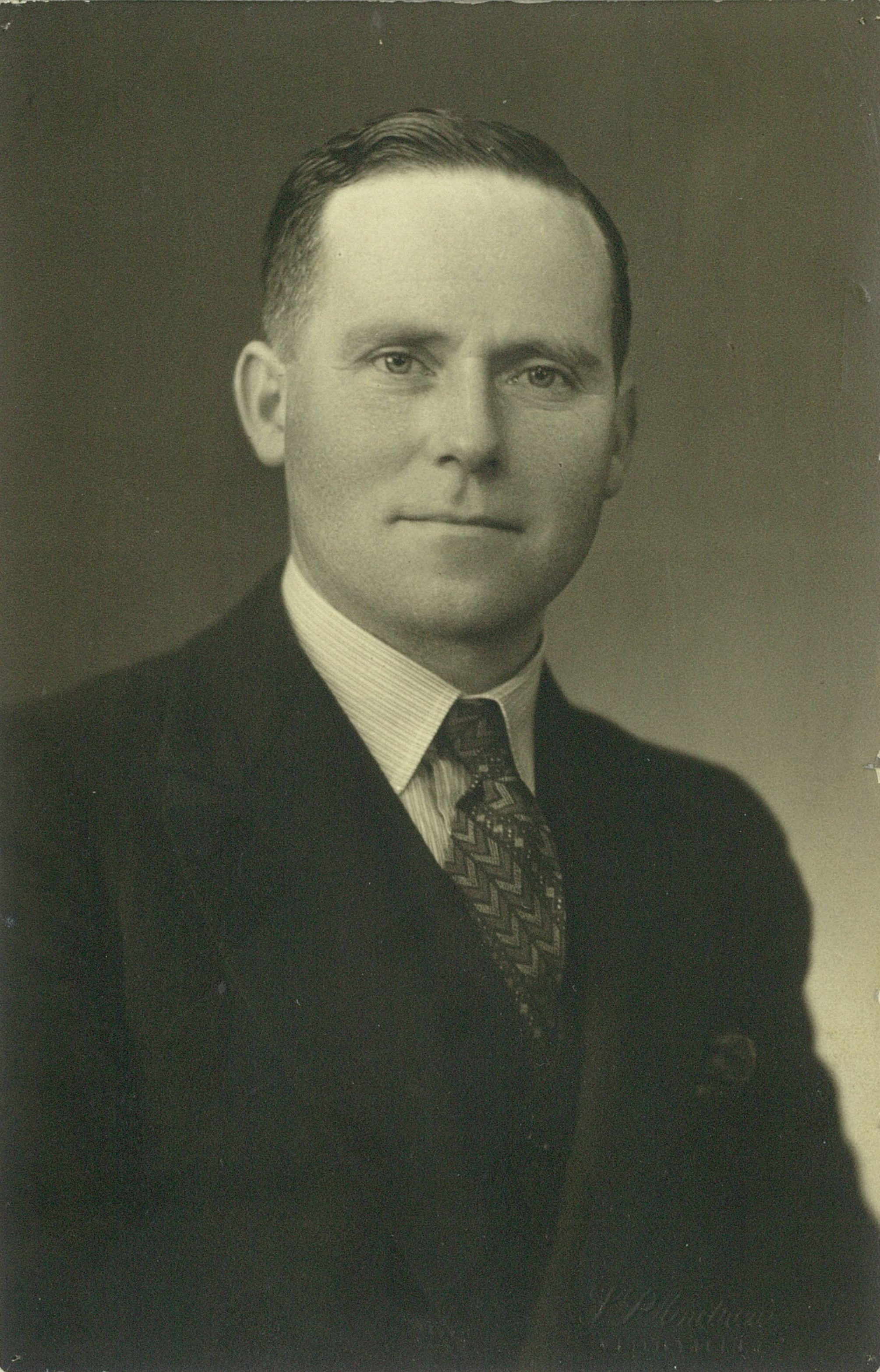
William Riddet

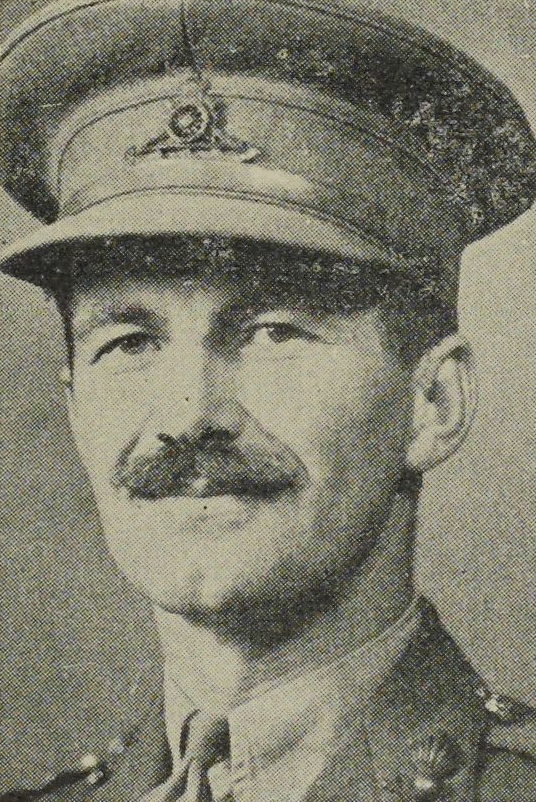
Rusty Page

=== Officer (OBE) ===
Civil division

- William Arthur Anderson MB ChB JP – of Queenstown. For services to the community.
- Marjorie Fulton Barnett – deputy director of the nursing division, Health Department.
- John Blacklock Carruthers – of Eketāhuna. For services to local government.
- Harold Fisher Guy – mayor of Kaikohe. For services to education and local government.
- Walter Alexander Lee – president of the New Zealand Counties Association.
- Wallace George Lowe – of Hastings; a member of the Mount Everest Expedition, 1953.
- Norman Harold Moss – mayor of Stratford.
- The Honourable William James Rogers – formerly a member of the Legislative Council, mayor of Wanganui.
- John Brown Sim JP – of Pukekohe. For services to education.
- William Alfred Stevenson – of Auckland. For services to the community.

Military division

- The Reverend Henry Gordon Taylor DSO – chaplain, Royal New Zealand Navy.
- Lieutenant-Colonel Edgar William Aked MC – New Zealand Territorial Force.
- Wing Commander Stanley Gilbert Quill DFC – Royal New Zealand Air Force.
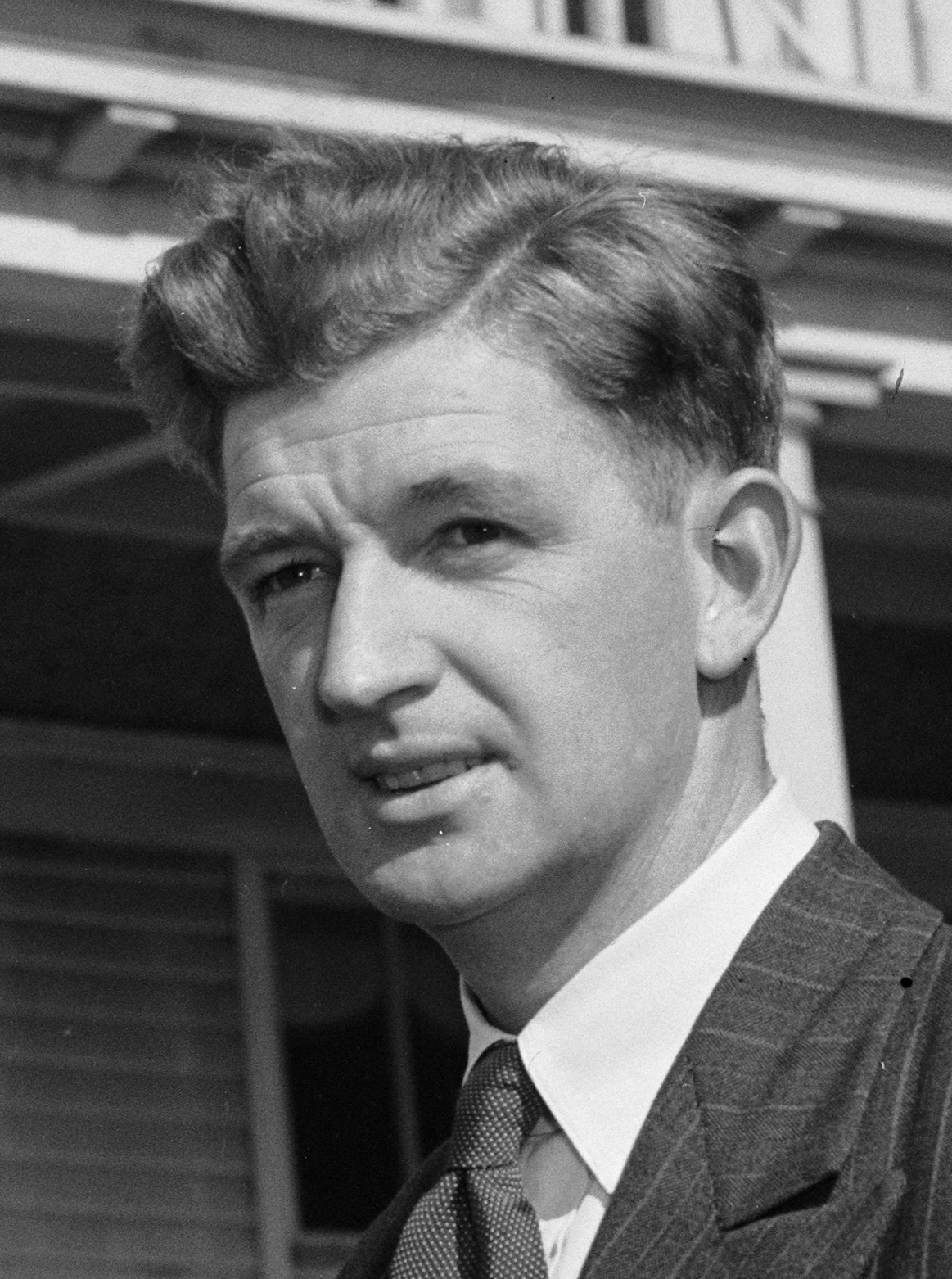
George Lowe

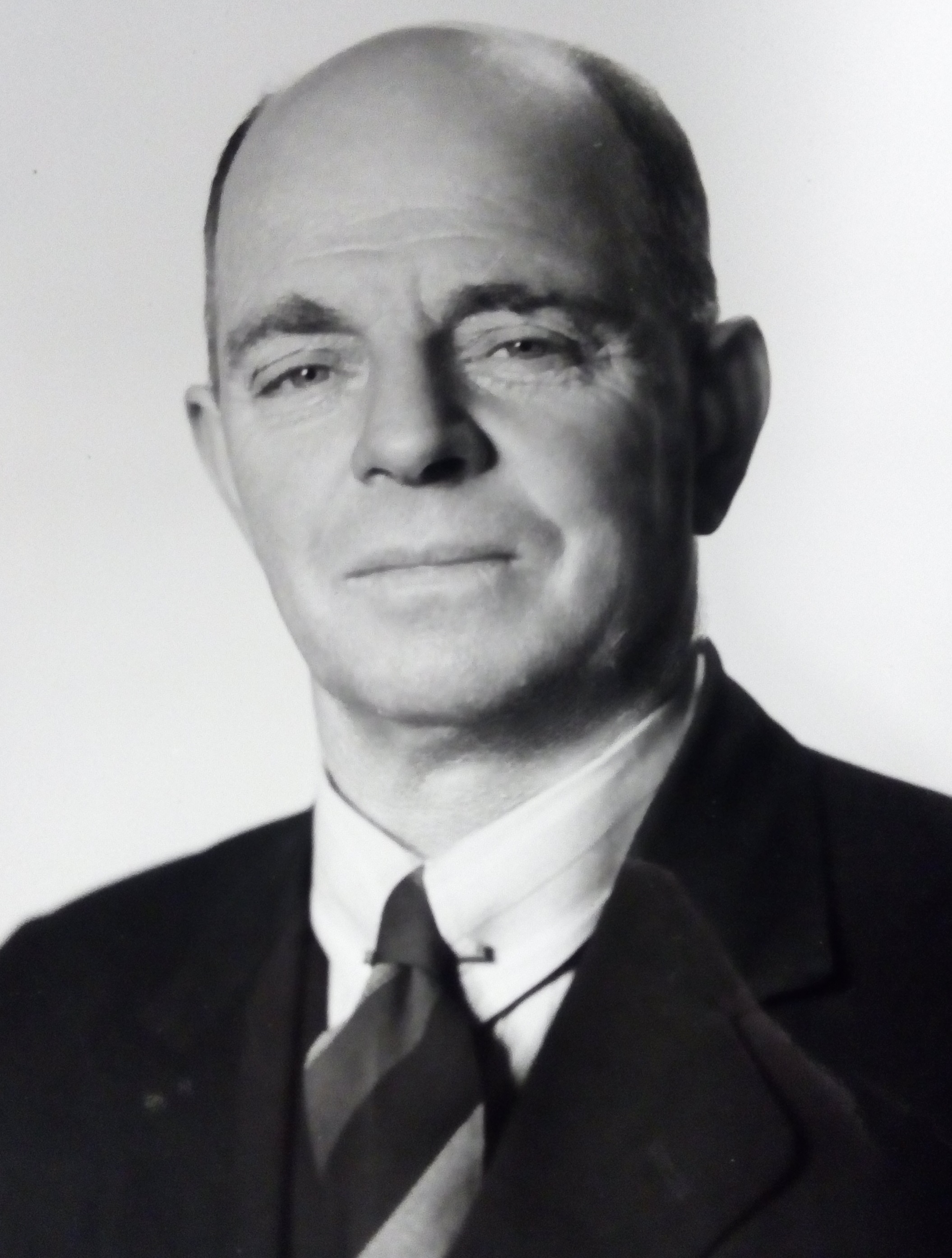
Bill Rogers

=== Member (MBE) ===
Civil division

- Carrie Sarah McDiarmid Adnams – of Auckland. For social welfare services.
- George Frederick Allen – of Christchurch. For services to the community.
- Walter Edward Barber – of Foxton. For services to the community.
- Catherine Jane Campbell – matron of the Presbyterian children's home, Timaru
- John Corder JP – of Nelson. For services to local government.
- Lily Ann Donohue – of Christchurch. For services to nursing.
- Helen May Hunter – of Waipukurau. For services in the interests of returned servicemen.
- Ellen Isabella Maider – of Dunedin. For social welfare services.
- The Reverend Wharetini Rangi – a Church of England minister, of Ruatoki North, Bay of Plenty. For services to the Māori people.
- Walter George Rutherford – secretary of the Palmerston North branch of the Returned Soldiers' Association.
- Donald William Rutledge JP – of Auckland. For services to the community.
- Norma Leonie Shelton – of Gisborne. For social welfare services.
- Kenneth George Leslie Smith – conductor of the New Zealand National Band during its 1953 tour overseas.
- Walter Frederick Sturman – of Invercargill. For services to local government.
- Mairatea Tahiwi – vice-president of the Māori Women's Welfare League.
- Leyden Josephine Tingey – superintendent of the Dunedin Hospital district nursing service.
- Herbert Frederick Wood JP – a prominent singer of Wellington. For services to the community.

Military division

- Senior Commissioned Mechanician William Robert Paul – Royal New Zealand Navy.
- Lieutenant-Commander (S) Thomas Ronald Roydhouse – Royal New Zealand Naval Volunteer Reserve.
- Major Geoffrey Lawrence Falck ED – New Zealand Territorial Force.
- Warrant Officer First Class Benjamin Keith Gilmer – Royal New Zealand Artillery.
- Major (temporary) Frank Rennie – New Zealand Regiment.
- Flight Lieutenant William Robert Duncan – Royal New Zealand Air Force.
- Warrant Officer Cedric Rex Carter – Royal New Zealand Air Force.
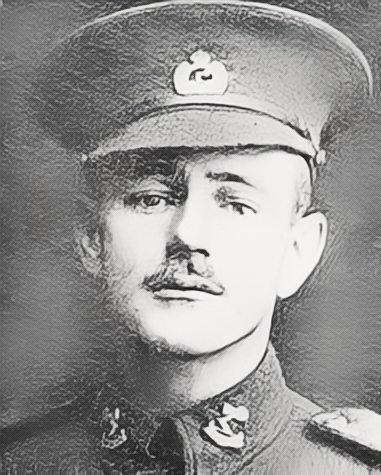
Donald Rutledge

== British Empire Medal (BEM) ==
Civil division

- Alice Hollis – caretaker, Government House, Wellington.
- Charles Stanley Yates – fuel officer in charge, Naval Dockyard, Auckland.

Military division

- Chief Petty Officer Charles Ivan Francis Brewis – Royal New Zealand Navy.
- Chief Petty Officer George Gerald Dessurne – Royal New Zealand Navy.
- Chief Petty Officer Donald Edgar George Nichols – Royal New Zealand Naval Volunteer Reserve.
- Lance-Corporal John Samuel Moyle – Royal New Zealand Electrical and Mechanical Engineers.
- Flight Sergeant Victor James Braggins – Royal New Zealand Air Force.
- Sergeant Gerald Mason Batchelor – Royal New Zealand Air Force.

== Royal Red Cross ==
=== Associate (ARRC) ===
- Matron (temporary) Rachel Mary Simpson – Royal New Zealand Nursing Corps.
- Matron Lucille Emily Souness – Royal New Zealand Nursing Corps.

== Air Force Cross (AFC) ==
- Squadron Leader John Ronald Day MBE – Royal New Zealand Air Force.
- Squadron Leader Robert Duncan McVicker – Royal New Zealand Air Force.
- Squadron Leader Cyril Laurence Siegert DFC – Royal New Zealand Air Force.
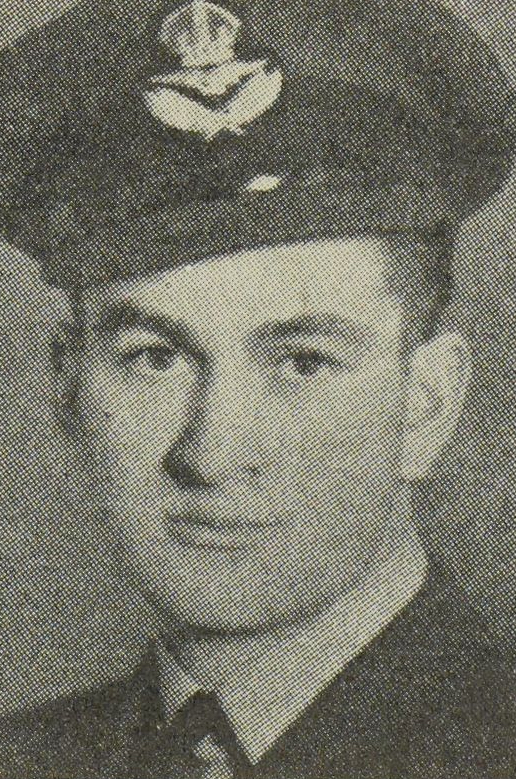
Larry Siegert

== Queen's Commendation for Valuable Service in the Air ==
- Flight Lieutenant Keith Cecil Noble-Campbell – Royal New Zealand Air Force.
