= Yendell =

Yendell is a surname. Notable people with the surname include:

- Arthur Yendell (1910–2004), New Zealand businessman and diplomat
- Sophie Yendell (born 2002), English swimmer
- William John Yendell (1903–1988), British Royal Navy officer
