= Luke Hazlett =

New Zealand farmer and diplomat

Luke Hazlett CBE

7th High Commissioner of New Zealand to Australia
- In office 11 April 1964 – 10 August 1970
- Preceded by: Jack Shepherd
- Succeeded by: Arthur Yendell

Personal details
- Born: 24 April 1909; Southland, New Zealand
- Died: 1 September 1987 (aged 78); Invercargill, New Zealand
- Political party: National
- Spouse: Anita Tapley (m. 1935)
- Children: 5
- Relatives: Bill Hazlett (brother); Jack Hazlett (son)
- Education: Waitaki Boys' High School
- Occupation: Farmer; diplomat

James Luke Hazlett CBE (24 April 1909 – 1 September 1987) was a New Zealand farmer and diplomat. He served as the New Zealand High Commissioner to Australia from 1964 to 1970.

== Biography ==
Hazlett was born in Southland on 24 April 1909, the son of Kate (née Stephenson) and William Thomas Hazlett. His mother was the daughter of one of the founders of stock and station agents Wright Stephenson, and his father was a merchant and had extensive landholdings. He was educated at Waihopai School and Waitaki Boys' High School. After leaving school, he worked as a farmer on his family's property at Burwood. A drama enthusiast he joined Allan Wilkie's Shakespearian Company in Australia for a year before returning to Burwood in 1934. He then took over a property at the Ōreti River town of Winton that he called Gretna Green in 1934.

During World War II, Hazlett served in Italy with the 20th Armoured Regiment, ending the war in Trieste. He was active politically and was the Otago-Southland division president of the National Party for seven years and also served on the party's executive.

In 1964, Hazlett was appointed as New Zealand High Commissioner to Australia by Prime Minister Keith Holyoake. When he first arrived in Canberra, he met Australian Prime Minister, Sir Robert Menzies and said to him, "I am not a diplomat. I am as green as grass and have just come off the turnips." Hazlett was popular with Australian politicians and reporters, with many editorials headed "Goodbye Luke" when he left the role in 1970. Menzies suggested that he should write a memoir with the title Green as Grass.

Hazlett served on both the New Zealand Nature Conservation Council and the New Zealand Motor Spirits Licensing Authority, and was a life member of the Royal Agricultural Society. He owned many horses and was a master and life member of the Birchwood Hunt and a life member of the Southland Racing Club. In the 1979 New Year Honours, Hazlett was appointed a Commander of the Order of the British Empire, for public services.

Hazlett died on 1 September 1987 in Invercargill after a long illness, aged 78. He was survived by his wife and five children.

== Personal life and family ==
Hazlett married to Anita Mary Tapley in January 1935. They had three sons and two daughters. Anita was Dominion chairperson and sponsorship secretary of the Save the Children Fund and later the president of the Southland Omaui children's holiday camp.

Hazlett's older brother, Bill, was an All Black in the 1920s, and his son Jack was an All Black in the mid-1960s.

Diplomatic posts
Preceded by Jack Shepherd	High Commissioner to Australia; 1964–1970	Succeeded by Arthur Yendell
