= Dorothy Davies (pianist) =

New Zealand pianist and piano teacher

Dorothy Davies MBE JP
- Born: 24 October 1899; River Bank, Wanganui, New Zealand
- Died: 11 July 1987 (aged 87); Whangaparaoa, New Zealand
- Occupation(s): Pianist and piano teacher
- Spouse: Reuel Lochore (m. 1940)

Dorothy Ida Davies MBE JP (24 October 1899 – 11 July 1987) was a New Zealand pianist and piano teacher. She was born in Riverbank, Wanganui, New Zealand on 24 October 1899. She obtained her education at Wanganui Girls' College, and studied piano at the New South Wales State Conservatorium of Music in Sydney, and at the Royal College of Music in London, where she became an associate. She then had private tuition by Artur Schnabel

In early 1940, she married Reuel Anson Lochore. He became a diplomat with the Department of External Affairs and they lived in India from 1962, then Indonesia, and then West Germany (1966–1969), where he was New Zealand's first ambassador to Germany.

She was a member of Makara County Council in the 1950s, and acted as a justice of the peace. In the 1975 Queen's Birthday Honours, she was appointed a Member of the Order of the British Empire, for services to music.

Davies died at Whangaparaoa on 11 July 1987. Her husband died in 1991.
