= Doug Zohrab =

New Zealand diplomat and public servant (1917–2008)

Permanent Representative of New Zealand to the United Nations Office at Geneva
- In office 1961–1965
- Monarch: Elizabeth II
- Prime Minister: Keith Holyoake
- Succeeded by: William Gray Thorp (1922)

High Commissioner of New Zealand to Malaysia
- In office 1967–1969
- Monarch: Elizabeth II
- Prime Minister: Keith Holyoake
- Preceded by: Hunter Wade
- Succeeded by: Dick Hutchens

Ambassador of New Zealand to Germany
- In office 1969–1974
- Monarch: Elizabeth II
- Prime Minister: Keith Holyoake; Jack Marshall; Norman Kirk
- Preceded by: Reuel Lochore
- Succeeded by: Hunter Wade

Personal details
- Born: 14 July 1917 Wellington, New Zealand
- Died: 1 June 2008 (aged 90) Waikanae, New Zealand
- Spouse: Rosemary Alice Miller
- Children: 2
- Occupation: Diplomat and public servant

Balfour Douglas Zohrab (14 July 1917 – 1 June 2008) was a New Zealand diplomat and public servant.

== Life ==
Zohrab was born in Wellington of a part-Armenian family whose paternal ancestor was moved from Armenia to Persia by the Shah in around 1600 AD. Members of the family became influential in Persia and were forced to escape political assassination at the end of the 18th century by fleeing to Turkey. In due course, some family members moved, in turn, to Malta, England, South Africa, Australia, and New Zealand. He was an amateur pianist who reportedly played on Radio New Zealand in his youth, and he was interested in the arts generally. His other hobbies were reading, contract bridge and gardening. He married Rosemary Alice Miller in 1947;

Zohrab was educated at Nelson College from 1930 to 1933. In 1934 he became a newspaper copyholder and junior reporter on Wellington's Evening Post newspaper. He graduated from Victoria University of Wellington with a master's degree in history in 1937 and became an assistant librarian at Parliament's General Assembly Library. Apart from his native English, he knew French, Italian, German, some Japanese, some Malay, and taught himself Russian.

== Career ==
In World War II, Zohrab was a cipher clerk on General Freyberg's staff, where his duties included interviewing Italian prisoners of war. He spent time recuperating from illness in Lebanon, then was invalided home from the Middle East. In 1944, he was appointed to the Ministry of Rehabilitation, then to the Prime Minister's Department, in the section that became what is now known as the New Zealand Ministry of Foreign Affairs and Trade. He served in London, Moscow, Paris, then in Wellington and, overseas again, in Tokyo. He was the first Permanent Representative to the UN in Geneva 1961–64, worked at Wellington headquarters, then was made High Commissioner to Malaysia 1967–69, then Ambassador to Germany 1969–74 accredited also to Austria, Switzerland and Poland. He retired in 1974, after 26 years of service overseas.

Zohrab died in Waikanae in 2008, leaving two sons.
