= Bill Hazlett =

New Zealand rugby union player

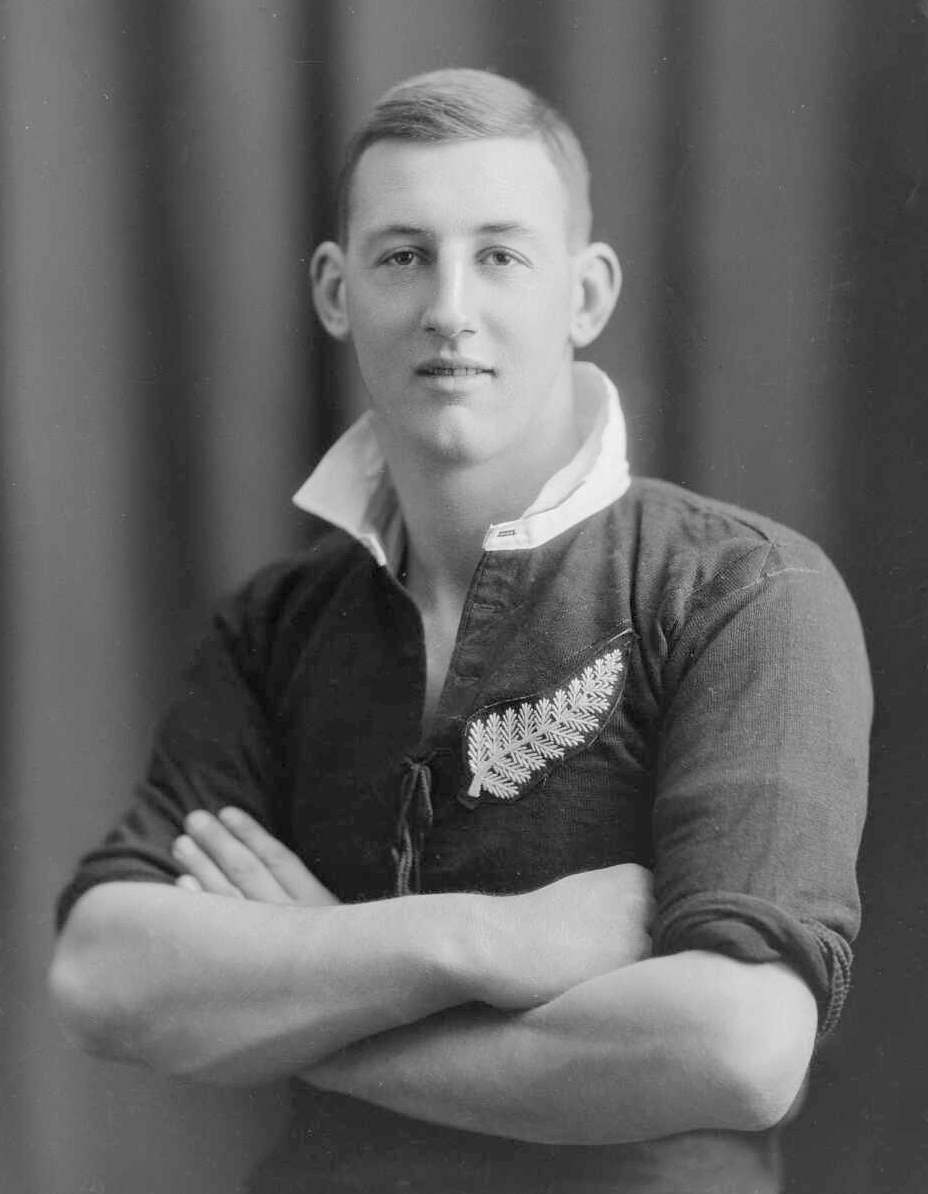
- Born: William Edgar Hazlett; 8 November 1905 Invercargill, New Zealand
- Died: 13 April 1978 (aged 72) Gore, New Zealand
- Height: 1.83 m (6 ft 0 in)
- Weight: 95 kg (209 lb)
- School: Waitaki Boys' High School
- Notable relatives: Luke Hazlett (brother); Jack Hazlett (nephew)
- Occupation: Farmer

Rugby union career
- Position: Loose forward
Provincial / State sides
Years	Team	Apps	(Points)
1925–1930	Southland		
International career
Years	Team	Apps	(Points)
1926–1930	New Zealand	8	(0)

William Edgar Hazlett (8 November 1905 – 13 April 1978) was a New Zealand rugby union player, farmer, racehorse owner and breeder.

== Early life and family ==
Born in Invercargill, New Zealand on 8 November 1905, Hazlett was the son of Kate Hazlett (née Stephenson), whose father John Stephenson was one of the founders of Wright Stephenson, and William Thomas Hazlett, a merchant and landholder. He was educated at Waitaki Boys' High School. He married Joan Marion Nicoll at Ashburton on 4 November 1931. The couple went on to have three children.

== Rugby union ==
A loose forward, Hazlett represented Southland at a provincial level, and was a member of the New Zealand national side, the All Blacks, from 1926 to 1930. He played 26 matches for the All Blacks including eight internationals.

== Horse racing ==
Hazlett was involved in horse racing from an early age, and in later years was far better known through this part of his life than for his rugby exploits. Amongst New Zealand's leading owners for many years, and topping the table six times, he became the first (and so far only) New Zealander to win more than 1,000 races as an owner. He trained many of these himself, being good enough in that field to be twice runner-up in the national trainers' premiership, before relinquishing the reins to Bill Hillis, his private trainer from 1959. Although he won all of New Zealand's top jumping races, his most notable feat was winning the iconic Great Western Steeplechase at Riverton no fewer than 16 times. He also trained the first seven of these winners.

== Death ==
A successful dog trialist, Hazlett collapsed and died while competing near Gore on 13 April 1978. He was buried at Lynwood Cemetery, Te Anau.
