= George Alderton =

New Zealand businessman

George Edwin Alderton (25 August 1854 – 7 March 1942) was a New Zealand newspaper proprietor and editor, orchardist, land agent. He was born in New Malden, Surrey, England on 25 August 1854.

He unsuccessfully contested the 1899 election in the Marsden electorate.

The diplomat Lisle Alderton was his son.
