= Jan Anderson (scientist) =

New Zealand scientist

- Born: Joan Mary Anderson; 12 May 1932; Queenstown, New Zealand
- Died: 28 August 2015 (aged 83); Canberra, Australia
- Relatives: William Anderson (father)

Joan Mary "Jan" Anderson FAA FRS (13 May 1932 – 28 August 2015) was a New Zealand scientist who worked in Canberra, Australia, distinguished by her investigation of photosynthesis.

== Life ==
Joan Mary Anderson was born in 1932 in Queenstown, New Zealand. Her father Dr Bill Anderson was a country doctor. Her mother died, after a long illness, when Anderson was eight. After high school, Anderson decided to study organic chemistry at the University of Otago. At the time, degrees were issued by the University of New Zealand, and she obtained a BSc and MSc with first class honours.

She obtained a scholarship, the King George V Memorial Fellowship for New Zealand, that allowed her to undertake postgraduate studies in the United States for one year. When she arrived at the University of California, Berkeley, she found that her New Zealand postgraduate degree was not recognised, which denied her access to the library, research facilities, and health insurance. To overcome this problem, she enrolled for a PhD, which she studied towards at the UC Berkeley College of Chemistry (1956–59) under the supervision of Melvin Calvin; Calvin received the Nobel Prize in Chemistry in 1961.

She then taught at Wellington Girls' High School under a bond, but broke this arrangement to take up a job offer with the Commonwealth Scientific and Industrial Research Organisation (CSIRO) made to her four years earlier by John Falk of CSIRO Plant Industry.

She was the first to show that the photosynthetic mechanism comprises two fundamental components: photosystem I and photosystem II. Anderson was an adjunct professor at the Australian National University.

Anderson died on 28 August 2015. Her funeral was held at St John the Baptist Church, Reid, Canberra.

== Awards and honors ==
She received many honors and awards for her work, including the Lemberg Medal in 1983, election as a Fellow of the Australian Academy of Science in 1987, and as a Fellow of the Royal Society in 1996. She was awarded an honorary doctorate from Umeå University in 1998. She was awarded the Centenary Medal in 2001. In 2017, she was selected as one of the Royal Society of New Zealand's "150 women in 150 words".
