= Malaysian New Zealanders =

Total population
- 17,464 Malaysian-born (2018)

Regions with significant populations
- Particularly Wellington; also Auckland and the South Island

Languages
- New Zealand English, Malaysian English, Chinese (Cantonese, Min Chinese, Malaysian Mandarin), Tamil, Malay, Orang Asal languages

Religion
- Buddhism, Christianity, Hinduism, Islam

Related ethnic groups
- Various ethnic groups of Malaysia

Malaysian New Zealanders are New Zealand citizens and residents who are of Malaysian descent or Malaysian-born immigrants. As of 2018, approximately 17,464 Malaysian-born people lived in New Zealand, with a much higher number of New Zealanders with Malaysian ancestry.

== History ==
During the British colonial period, 42 people born in 1910s on the Straits Settlements (of which is now called Malaysia and Singapore) became the first residents of New Zealand. Most of them were the ethnic Malays and Chinese.

Emerging racial riots in Malaysia in 1969 prompted more students from the ethnic Chinese community to seek an education in New Zealand. Following the riots, the Malaysian Government introduced affirmative action policies to help the Bumiputera (mainly the Malays and indigenous people) to achieve a higher economic quality of life than the Chinese. Preferential university entry for the Bumiputera made it more difficult for ethnic Chinese to enter Malaysian institutions of higher learning, making it preferable for Malaysian Chinese to move and study in New Zealand universities - typically under the Colombo Plan - rather than in their own country.

In 1986, there were 3,480 Malaysians in New Zealand which later increased to 14,547 in 2006. Of this total, only 3,540 were Malays while most were Malaysian Chinese.

== Notable Malaysian New Zealanders ==
- Michelle Ang, actress
- Bic Runga, singer-songwriter
- Luise Fong, artist
- Kamal Bamadhaj, human rights activist
- John Chen, concert pianist.
- Sue Maroroa, New Zealand Women’s Chess champion

== See also ==
- Islam in New Zealand
- Malaysia–New Zealand relations
- Military history of New Zealand in Malaysia
- Malaysian Australians
