= Jack Hazlett =

Jack Hazlett MNZM
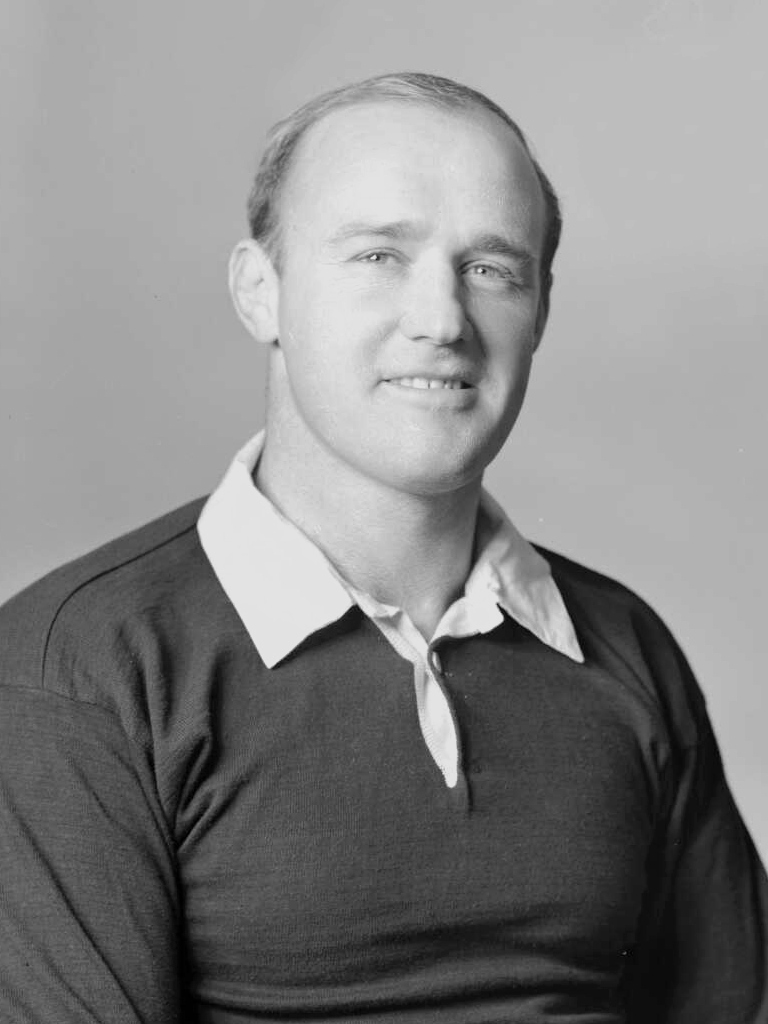
- Born: Edward John Hazlett; 21 July 1938 Invercargill, New Zealand
- Died: 16 December 2014 (aged 76) Invercargill, New Zealand
- Height: 1.88 m (6 ft 2 in)
- Weight: 95 kg (209 lb)
- School: Christ's College
- Notable relatives: Luke Hazlett (father); Bill Hazlett (uncle)

Rugby union career
- Position: Prop
Provincial / State sides
Years	Team	Apps	(Points)
1960–1968	Southland	87	
International career
Years	Team	Apps	(Points)
1966–1967	New Zealand	6	(0)

Edward John Hazlett MNZM (21 July 1938 – 16 December 2014) was a New Zealand rugby union player. A prop, Hazlett represented Southland at a provincial level, and was a member of the New Zealand national side, the All Blacks, in 1966 and 1967. He played 12 matches for the All Blacks including six internationals.

Hazlett went on to establish Slinkskins Ltd, a Southland-based tanning company, in 1968, and in the 1996 Queen's Birthday Honours he was appointed a Member of the New Zealand Order of Merit, for services to export.
