= William Anderson (New Zealand politician) =

New Zealand politician

William Arthur Anderson OBE OStJ JP (29 September 1888 – 19 August 1978) was the fifteenth mayor of Queenstown Borough in New Zealand. He served two terms as mayor, from 1939 to 1950, and from 1953 to 1956. He spent 16 years as an elected member of the Queenstown Borough Council, 10 of which were as deputy mayor.

== Early life and family ==
Anderson was born in 1888 in Grays, Essex, and once visited New Zealand in 1905. He studied medicine at the University of Otago, graduating MB ChB in 1920.

In June 1920, Anderson married Mary Lee. Their daughter, Jan, became a leading researcher in photosynthesis. Anderson's wife died after a long illness when Jan was eight years old.

Anderson lived with his second wife, Molly Anderson (who died in 1998 aged 102 years), in a villa on 11 Stanley St, Queenstown, that stood until 2016. Property bordered Stanley St and Melbourne st until prime property redevelopment. Hotel Planned for Prime Location

== Medical career ==
He moved to Queenstown, New Zealand in 1920, and remained there for 30 years as the town's sole medical practitioner. He spent 27 years as the superintendent of Wakatipu Hospital until his retirement in 1950, responding to medical requests across the district.

In the 1954 New Year Honours, Anderson was appointed an Officer of the Order of the British Empire, for services to the community.

Anderson wrote a popular memoir, Doctor in the Mountains, which described his recollections of working in the "rugged and enormous parish" of the Lake Wakatipu district, taking difficult journeys to treat patients despite limited medical and surgical resources.

== Other activities ==
Anderson was also the first president of the Queenstown and District Historical Society, the sub-centre chairman of the St John Ambulance Queenstown, and the St John's divisional superintendent. In 1970, Anderson's 50 years of voluntary service was recognised by his appointment as an Officer of the Order of St John.

== Death and legacy ==
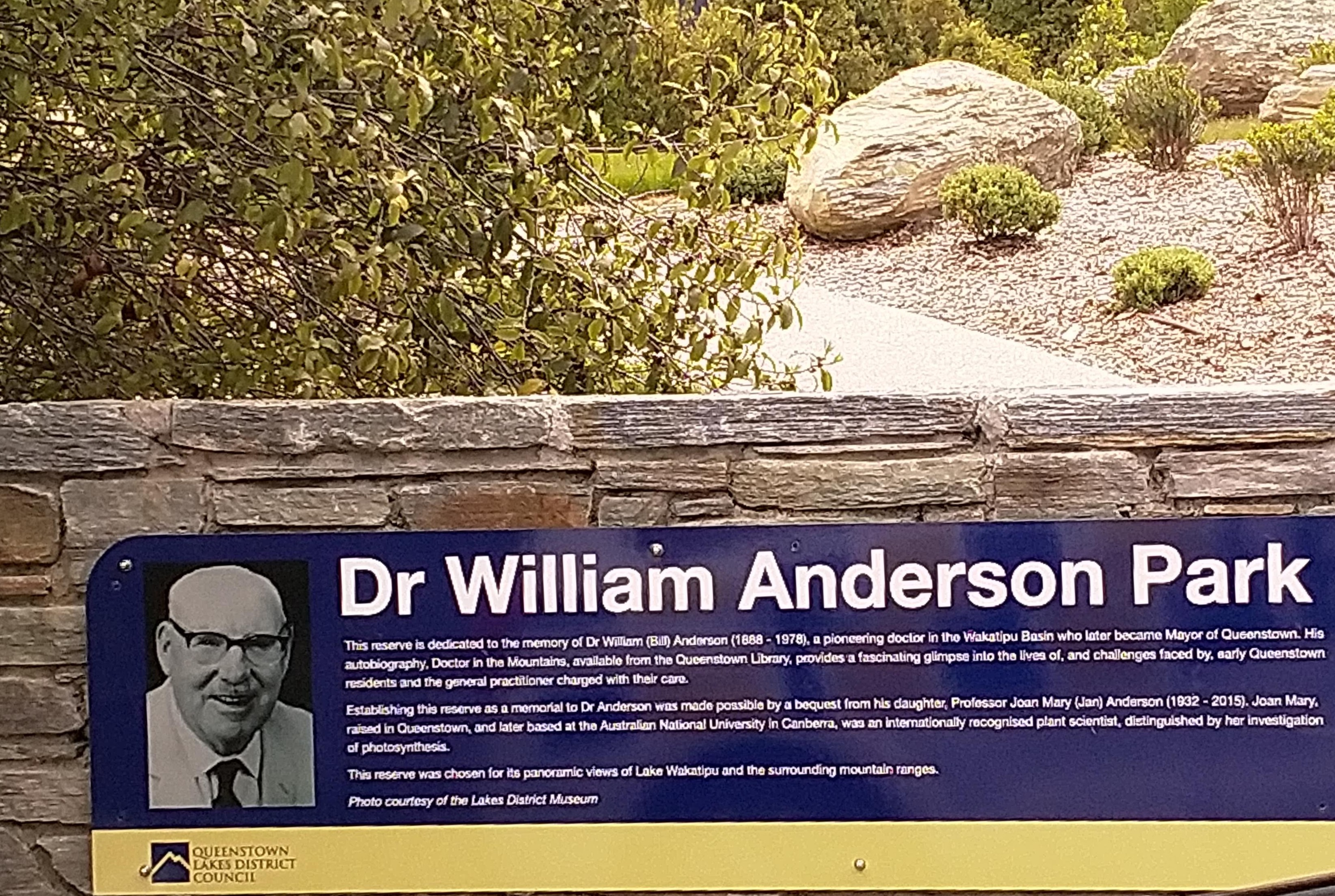
Dr William Anderson Park

Anderson died in 1978, at the age of 90. A park located off Windsor Place on Queenstown Hill was named after him in 2016. Funded by a bequest from Anderson's daughter, Jan Anderson, the park received a significant upgrade in 2019 with a memorial plaque, weather vane, seating, and new planting.
