= Syd Johnston =

New Zealand accountant and diplomat

5th High Commissioner of New Zealand to Australia
- In office 31 May 1961 – 10 May 1963
- Preceded by: Fred Jones
- Succeeded by: Jack Shepherd

Personal details
- Born: 14 November 1900 Auckland, New Zealand
- Died: 10 May 1963 (aged 62) Canberra, Australian Capital Territory, Australia
- Party: National
- Spouse: Joyce Ewen Skelton (m. 1929)
- Education: Auckland University College
- Profession: Accountant

Sydney Cuthbert Johnston (14 November 1900 – 10 May 1963) was a New Zealand accountant and diplomat. He served as the New Zealand High Commissioner to Australia from 1961 to 1963.

== Biography ==
Johnston was born in 1900 in Auckland. He was educated at Auckland University College and did legal training from 1931 until 1934 when he became a public accountant. He was director of five companies in New Zealand. He was chairman of the Auckland division of the National Party from 1951 until 1957. In 1952 he was appointed a trustee of the Auckland Savings Bank in 1952 and was its president from 1959 until 1960. From 1952 to 1961 he was chairman of the Motor Spirits Licensing Authority.

Johnston married Joyce Ewen Skelton in 1929.

In 1961, Johnston was appointed New Zealand High Commissioner to Australia serving until 1963.

Johnston died at his desk of a heart attack in 1963 in Canberra, aged 62.

Diplomatic posts
Preceded by Fred Jones	High Commissioner to Australia; 1961–1963	Succeeded by Jack Shepherd
