= Lisle Alderton =

New Zealand naval officer and diplomat

Commander Lisle Alderton CMG

3rd High Commissioner of New Zealand to Australia
- In office 31 August 1950 – 1 April 1958
- Preceded by: Jim Barclay
- Succeeded by: Fred Jones

Personal details
- Born: 11 January 1888 Whangārei, New Zealand
- Died: 20 August 1969 (aged 81) Auckland, New Zealand
- Party: National
- Spouse: Kathleen Bronwen Lewis Leonard (m. 1945)
- Relatives: George Alderton (father)
- Education: Auckland University College
- Profession: Lawyer

Military service
- Allegiance: Royal New Zealand Navy
- Years of service: 1916–1919, 1939–45
- Rank: Commander
- Battles/wars: World War I; World War II

George Edwin Lisle Alderton CMG (11 January 1888 – 20 August 1969) was a New Zealand naval officer and diplomat. He served as the New Zealand High Commissioner to Australia from 1950 to 1958.

== Biography ==
Alderton was born in 1888 at Whangārei, the son of George Alderton. He was educated at Whangarei High School and Auckland Grammar School. He was also a provincial hockey representative for Auckland. He attended Auckland University College and worked as a lawyer and was a partner in an Auckland legal firm.

He served in the navy in World War I and again in World War II. In 1933 he became chairman of the Transport Appeal Board and chairman of the Transport Co-ordination Board from 1934 to 1936. He was a foundation member of the National Party and in 1936 he was elected chairman of the National Party's Auckland provincial executive. In 1945 he married Kathleen Bronwen Lewis Leonard.

In 1950 he was appointed as New Zealand High Commissioner to Australia serving until 1958. In the 1954 New Year Honours he was appointed a Companion of the Order of St Michael and St George.

== Notes ==
Diplomatic posts
Preceded by Jim Barclay	High Commissioner to Australia; 1950–1958	Succeeded by Fred Jones
