= Jack Shepherd (diplomat) =

New Zealand public servant and diplomat

5th Ambassador of New Zealand to West Germany
- In office 20 April 1982 – 5 June 1985
- Preceded by: Basil Bolt
- Succeeded by: Ted Farnon

5th High Commissioner of New Zealand to Malaysia
- In office 28 February 1977 – 14 February 1979
- Preceded by: Jim Weir
- Succeeded by: Michael Mansfield

10th High Commissioner of New Zealand to Canada
- In office 7 November 1973 – 7 December 1976
- Preceded by: Dean Eyre
- Succeeded by: Dean Eyre

6th High Commissioner of New Zealand to Australia
- In office 11 May 1963 – 11 April 1964
- Preceded by: Syd Johnston
- Succeeded by: Luke Hazlett

Personal details
- Born: 15 September 1924 Temuka, New Zealand
- Died: 2 May 1998 (aged 73) Wellington, New Zealand
- Spouse: Mary Wilkie (m. 1946)
- Children: 3
- Education: Victoria University of Wellington
- Profession: Public servant

Jack Shepherd (15 September 1924 − 2 May 1998) was a New Zealand public servant and diplomat. During his career, he served as the New Zealand high commissioner to Australia, Canada and Malaysia, and ambassador to West Germany.

== Biography ==
Shepherd was born in Temuka on 15 September 1924. He was educated at Timaru Boys' High School, and then served in the Royal New Zealand Air Force as a meteorologist from 1942 to 1946. In 1946, he married Mary Wilkie, and the couple went on to have three children. He graduated from Victoria University College with a Master of Arts degree with first-class honours in 1950.

Shepherd joined the Department of External Affairs and became a career diplomat, beginning in 1951 as the second secretary at the New Zealand High Commission in Australia, holding the role until 1954. From 1954 to 1955, he headed the United Nations Political Affairs Section of the Department of the External Affairs. Then he was first secretary and deputy head of mission at the New Zealand Commission in South East Asia, stationed in Singapore from 1955 to 1958. Returning to New Zealand, from 1958 to 1961 he was head of the Economic Division at the Department of External Affairs.

From 1963 to 1965, Shepherd was the acting High Commissioner to Australia after the death of Syd Johnston. He then served as minister and deputy head of mission in Singapore and Washington D.C. from 1966 to 1970. From 1972 to 1973, he was New Zealand's Director of External Aid.

From 1973 to 1976, Shepherd served as High Commissioner to Canada, and then, from 1977 to 1979, he was High Commissioner to Malaysia. He then served as Assistant Secretary of Foreign Affairs. From 1982 to 1985, his final posting was to Bonn as Ambassador to West Germany, after which he retired.

In 1977, Shepherd was awarded the Queen Elizabeth II Silver Jubilee Medal.

Diplomatic posts
Preceded by Syd Johnston	High Commissioner to Australia; 1963–1964	Succeeded by Luke Hazlett
