= William Riddet =

New Zealand agricultural scientist (1896–1958)

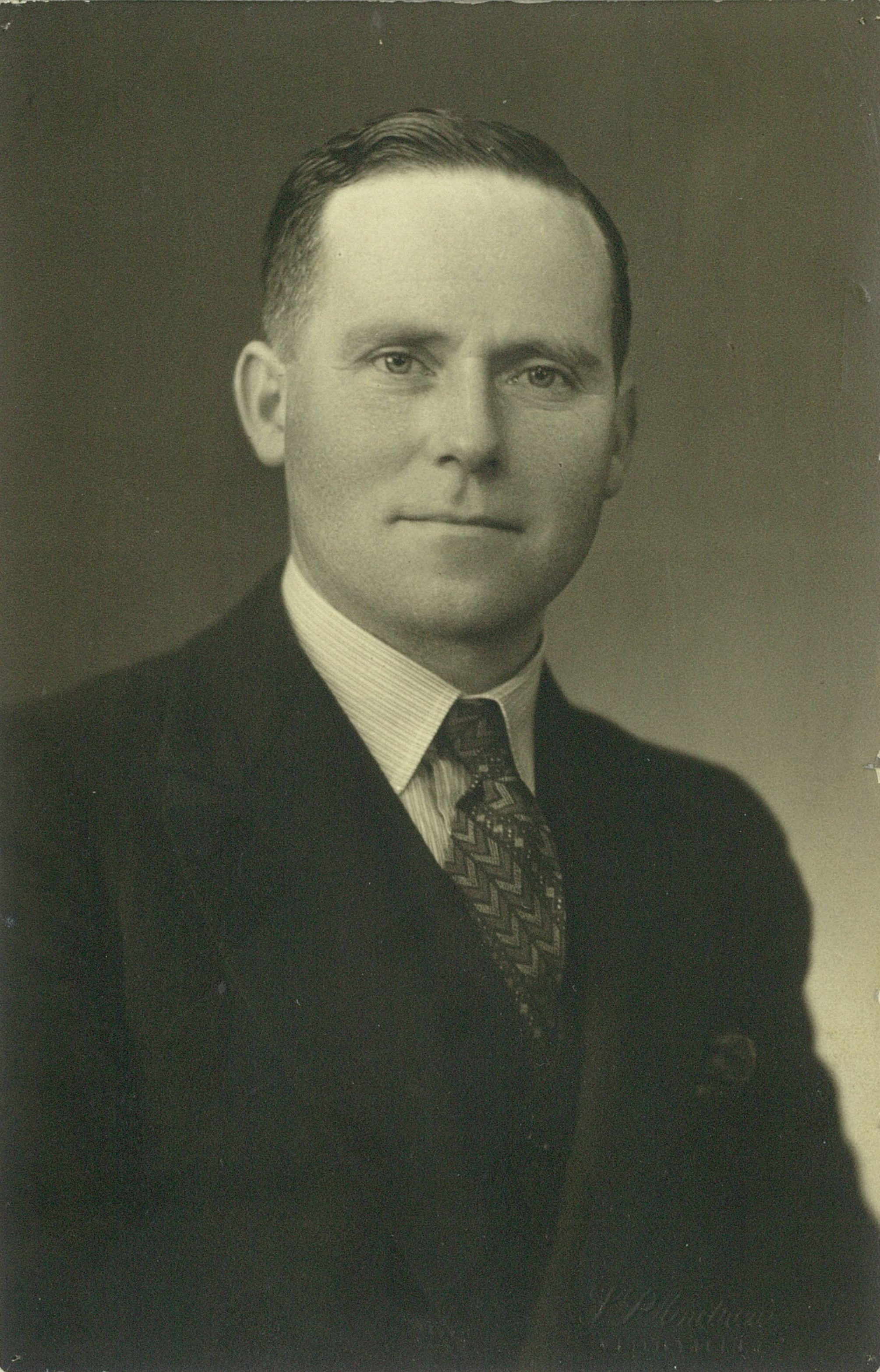
William Riddet

William Riddet CBE (1896–1958) was a New Zealand university professor, scientific administrator and agricultural scientist. He was born in Dalry, Ayrshire, Scotland, in 1896.

The Riddet Institute commemorates his name. He was a foundation chair of Massey Agricultural College and is regarded as the founder of dairy science in New Zealand. He had the idea of using electric fences for dairy feed control.

In 1953, Riddet was awarded the Queen Elizabeth II Coronation Medal. In the 1954 New Year Honours, he was appointed a Commander of the Order of the British Empire.
