= Malaysia–New Zealand relations =

- Malaysia: New Zealand

Diplomatic mission
- Malaysian High Commission, Wellington: New Zealand High Commission, Kuala Lumpur

Envoy
- High Commissioner H.E. Mazita Marzuki: High Commissioner H.E. Micheal Wehi Mailetonga Walsh

Malaysia–New Zealand relations (Malay: Hubungan Malaysia–New Zealand; Jawi: هوبوڠن مليسيا-نيوزيلند; Māori: Ngā whanaungatanga Aotearoa-Marēhia) refers to foreign relations between Malaysia and New Zealand. Malaysia has a High Commission in Wellington, and New Zealand has a High Commission in Kuala Lumpur. Both countries are full members of the Commonwealth of Nations and Malaysia is important to New Zealand for strategic, political and economic reasons, with both countries' leaders were engaged in frequent visits to boost their relations.

== Country comparison ==
| | Malaysia | New Zealand |
| Coat of Arms | | |
| Flag | Malaysia | New Zealand |
| Population | 31,360,000 | 5,084,000 |
| Area | 330,803 km^{2} (127,724 mi^{2}) | 268,021 km^{2} (103,483 mi^{2}) |
| Population Density | 92/km^{2} (240/sq mi) | 17.9/km^{2} (46/sq mi) |
| Time zones | 1 | 2 |
| Capital | Kuala Lumpur | Wellington |
| Largest City | Kuala Lumpur – 1,768,000 | Auckland – 1,657,200 |
| Government | Federal parliamentary elective constitutional monarchy | Unitary parliamentary constitutional monarchy |
| Established | 31 August 1957 (Independence from UK); 16 September 1963 (Formation of Malaysia) | 7 May 1856 |
| First Leader | Abdul Rahman of Negeri Sembilan (Monarch); Tunku Abdul Rahman (Prime Minister) | Queen Victoria (Monarch); Henry Sewell (Prime Minister) |
| Head of State | Monarch: Ibrahim | Monarch: Charles III |
| Head of Government | Prime Minister: Anwar Ibrahim | Prime Minister: Christopher Luxon |
| Legislature | Parliament of Malaysia | Parliament of New Zealand |
| Upper House | Senate; President: Wan Junaidi Tuanku Jaafar | none |
| Lower House | House of Representatives; Speaker: Johari Abdul | House of Representatives; Speaker: Adrian Rurawhe |
| Judiciary | Federal Court of Malaysia; Chief Justice: Tengku Maimun Tuan Mat | Supreme Court of New Zealand; Chief Justice: Helen Winkelmann |
| National language | Malay | English, Māori, NZ Sign Language |
| GDP (nominal) | $800.169 billion ($25,833 per capita) | US$215.1 billion (44,069 per capita) |

== History ==
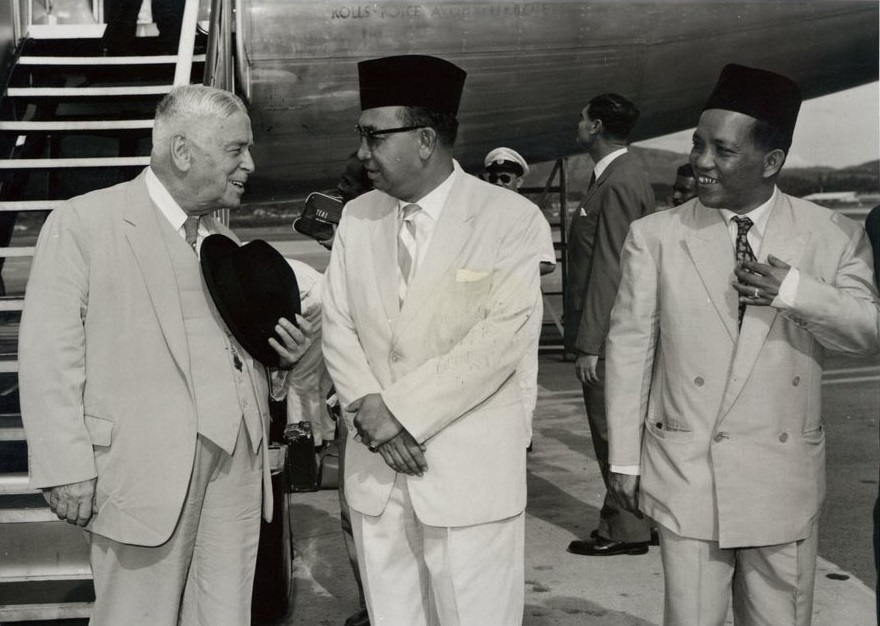
New Zealand Prime Minister Walter Nash with Deputy Malaysian Prime Minister Abdul Razak Hussein during Nash's visit to Kuala Lumpur in 1960.

Official diplomatic relations between Malaysia and New Zealand has been established since 25 September 1957, with Malaysia remains as one of the oldest partner for New Zealand in Southeast Asia. The New Zealand Defence Force (NZDF) has maintained its presence since the 1950s to fight alongside its allies from the threat of communism in the Malayan Emergency, Second Malayan Emergency and Sarawak Communist Insurgency. Following the formation of the Malaysian federation, the NZDF also defended the British Malaya and Borneo from the Indonesian military infiltration.

In June 2024, New Zealand Foreign Minister Winston Peters met with Malaysian Foreign Minister Mohamad Hasan, Malaysian Prime Minister Anwar Ibrahim, Deputy Prime Minister Fadillah Yusof and Opposition Leader Hamzah Zainudin to reaffirm bilateral cooperation in the areas of defence, security, people-to-people links, science and technology, and trade and economic engagement.

== Diplomatic relations ==
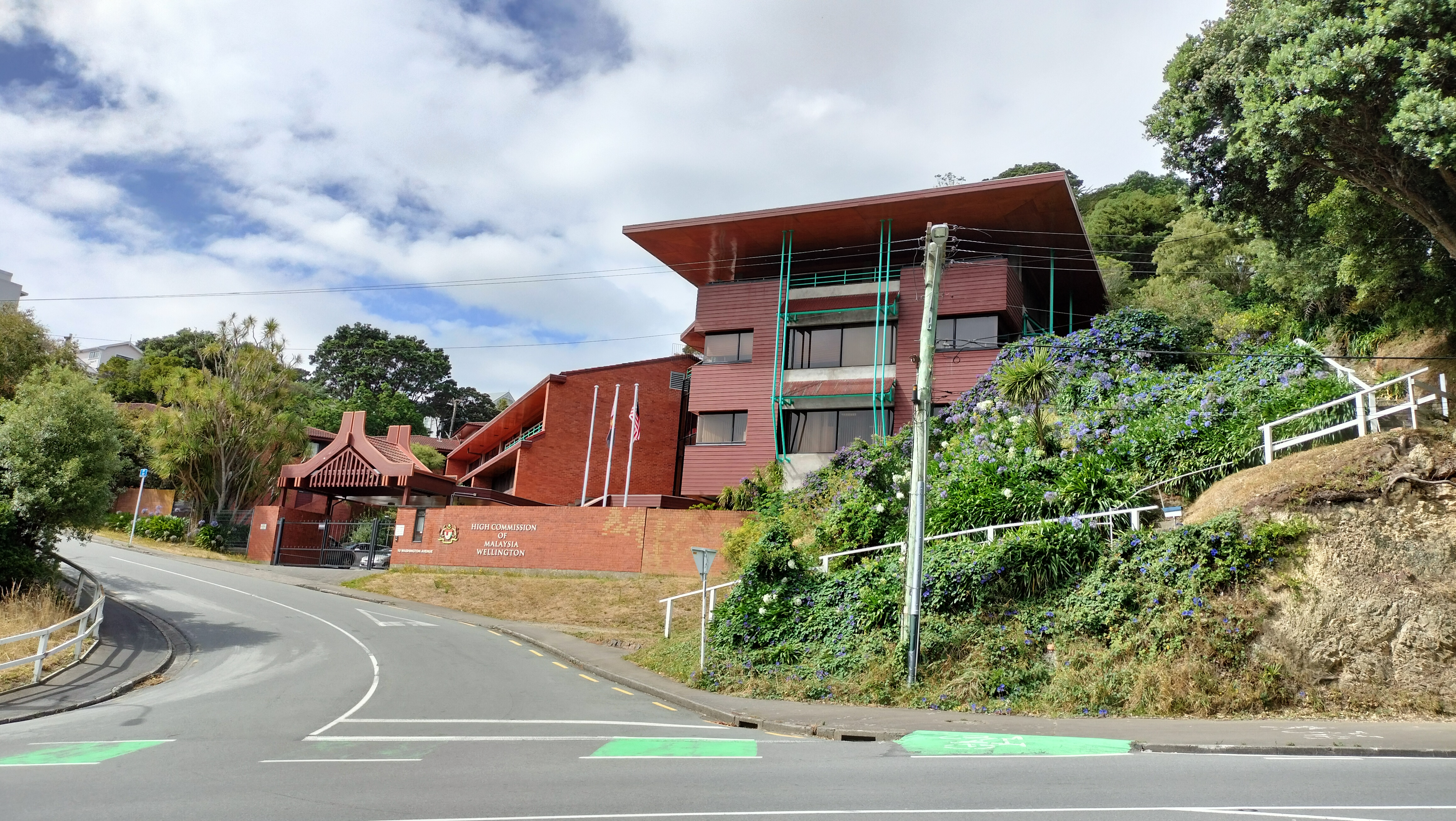
Malaysian High Commission in Wellington

Malaysia is represented by a High Commission in Wellington while New Zealand is represented by a High Commission in Kuala Lumpur.

In 2014, a Malaysian diplomat named Mohammed Rizalman Ismail was arrested by the New Zealand Police and charged with burglary and assault with intent to rape after allegedly following a 21-year-old woman, Tania Billingsley to her home in Wellington.

== Trade and economic relations ==
The economic relations between the two countries also underpinned by four free trade agreements, including:

- The Malaysia–New Zealand Free Trade Agreement.
- The ASEAN-Australia-New Zealand Free Trade Area (AANZFTA).
- The Regional Comprehensive Economic Partnership (RCEP).
- The Comprehensive and Progressive Agreement for Trans-Pacific Partnership (CPTPP).

The trade and economic relationship between Malaysia and New Zealand is strong. This is in part because Malaysia occupies an influential position within the Association of Southeast Asian Nations (ASEAN), and is well-known to New Zealanders. In 2005, Malaysia and New Zealand initiated discussions on a bilateral free-trade agreement. On 6 August 2020 Malaysia and New Zealand completed an Exchange of Letters to amend Article 1 of Annex 3 of the Malaysia New Zealand Free Trade Agreement. The amendment to Annex 3 entered into force on 1 October 2020.

In 2012, Malaysia was New Zealand's eighth-largest trading partner with Malaysia's exports comprising petroleum, computer and television equipment and palm oil worth around NZ$1.84 Billion, while New Zealand exports to Malaysia stood at NZ$888 million, consisting of dairy products, meat and scrap metal. A free trade agreement between the two countries was signed on 26 October 2009 in Kuala Lumpur, and entered into force in August 2010. Many New Zealand companies have a significant presence in Malaysia, primarily in the food, telecommunications and ICT sectors. The Free Trade Agreement aimed to encourage two-way investment between Malaysia and New Zealand.

The total bilateral trade between two countries in 2016 stood at US$1.42 billion. Exports amounted to US$730 million, while imports amounted to US$680 million. In 2017, the two countries expressed their interest to expand the collaboration in the ICT and tourism sectors. In the same year, New Zealand economic relations with Malaysia were also being discovered in other areas such as the food (mainly dairy products) and beverage sector and both countries announced their intention to foster stronger business and cultural links between them. A cultural exchange between Māori and the indigenous people of the Malaysian state of Sabah had been held in Kota Kinabalu. New Zealand welcomed a group of 15 government delegates from the Malaysian state of Sarawak for a meeting held in April 2019 to share and discuss common indigenous interests and co-operation.

== Education relations ==
Under the Colombo Plan, a large number of Malaysian students were given the opportunity to study in New Zealand. New Zealand is working to attract more students from Malaysia as part of the country efforts to promote it as a first choice for foreign study. An arrangement on higher education co-operation was signed between the two countries in 2013. In 2019, further education relations were reinforced between New Zealand and the Malaysian state of Sarawak.

== Security relations ==
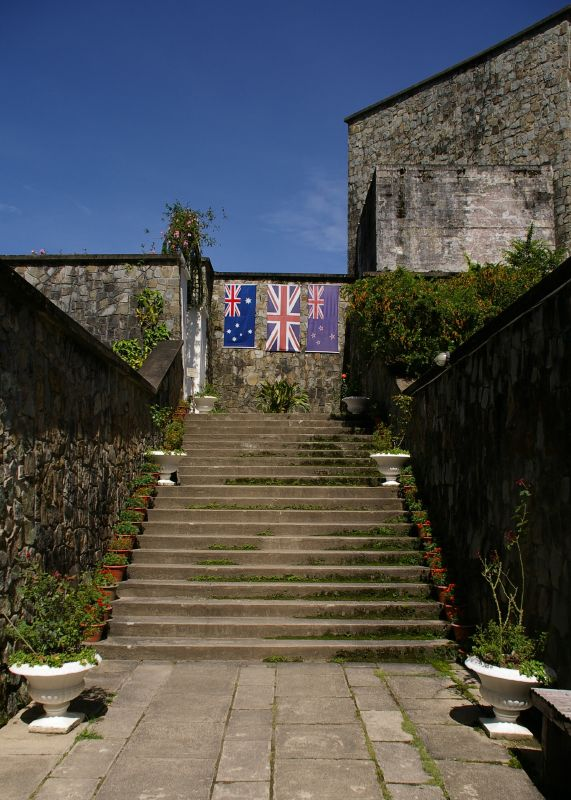
Three flags dedicated to Australian, British and New Zealanders soldiers in Kundasang War Memorial, Ranau, Sabah, Malaysia.

New Zealand and Malaysia are both members of the Five Power Defence Arrangements. New Zealand plays a key role in the frequent military exercises between the countries involved.

== Resident diplomatic missions ==
- Malaysia has a high commission in Wellington.
- New Zealand has a high commission in Kuala Lumpur and a consulate-general in Kuching.

== See also ==
- Malaysian New Zealanders
