= Malaysia–New Zealand Free Trade Agreement =

The Malaysia–New Zealand Free Trade Agreement was signed on 26 October 2009 in Kuala Lumpur.

Malaysia is New Zealand's eighth-largest export destination, reaching almost 8 billion dollars' worth of exports in 2008. It was ratified by the Parliament of New Zealand on 24 June 2010 and entered into force on 1 August 2010.

== See also ==
- New Zealand free trade agreements
- Free trade agreement
- Malaysia–New Zealand relations
