= List of high commissioners of New Zealand to Malaya =

The high commissioner of New Zealand to the Federation of Malaya was the head of New Zealand's diplomatic mission to Malaya. The position has the rank and status of an ambassador extraordinary and plenipotentiary and was based in the High Commission of New Zealand, Kuala Lumpur.

New Zealand first posted a resident high commissioner to Malaya in 1959.

As fellow members of the Commonwealth of Nations, diplomatic relations between New Zealand and Canada were at governmental level, rather than between heads of state. Thus, the countries exchanged high commissioners, rather than ambassadors.

== List of heads of mission ==
=== Commissioner to Malaya ===
==== Non-resident Commissioners, resident in Singapore ====
- Foss Shanahan (1955–1957)

=== High commissioners to Malaya ===
==== Non-resident high commissioners, resident in Singapore ====
- Foss Shanahan (1957–1959)

==== Resident high commissioners ====
- Charles Bennett (1959–1963)
- Hunter Wade (1963)

== See also ==
- List of high commissioners of New Zealand to Malaysia, for a list of chief diplomatic representatives in Malaysia after 1963.
