= 2014 Malaysian diplomat indecent assault case =

The Malaysian diplomat indecent assault case occurred on 9 May 2014 when the Malaysian diplomat Mohammed Rizalman bin Ismail was arrested by the New Zealand Police and charged with burglary and assault with intent to rape after allegedly following a 21-year-old woman, Tania Billingsley, to her home. Following an Official Information request filed by members of the New Zealand media, the New Zealand Government released details of the Rizalman case to the New Zealand public. The New Zealand Ministry of Foreign Affairs and Trade was criticised for allowing Rizalman to leave the country, which was blamed on miscommunication between the foreign ministries of the two countries.

Malaysia eventually agreed to send the diplomat back to assist in investigations. On 24 October 2014, Rizalman returned to New Zealand after the Malaysian Government received a formal extradition request from the New Zealand Government. On 30 November 2015 Rizalmann pleaded guilty to a charge of indecent assault in this case. On 4 February 2016, Rizalman was sentenced to nine months' home detention. On 4 November, Rizalman was deported back to Malaysia after serving his sentence.

== Diplomatic career ==
Prior to his first posting to New Zealand in 2013, Rizalman was a warrant officer in the Malaysian Army. He worked as an Assistant Defence Attache at the Malaysian High Commission in Wellington. Rizalman is also known to have a wife and three children. During his time in New Zealand, Rizalman and his family resided in the Wellington suburb of Newlands.

== Tania Billingsley sexual assault case ==
=== Alleged burglary and sexual assault ===
On 9 May 2014, Rizalman was arrested by the New Zealand Police after following a 21-year-old Wellington woman home and allegedly assaulting her. The following day, he appeared in the Wellington District Court and was charged with burglary and intent to rape, which carry a ten-year prison sentence. Rizalman claimed diplomatic immunity and was allowed to return to Malaysia on 22 May 2014. While the New Zealand Government asserted that it wanted Rizalman to remain in the country to face trial, miscommunication between Malaysian and New Zealand officials led the Malaysian Government to believe that the New Zealand Government would not object to repatriating Rizalman and him being tried before a Malaysian military court. According to the Malaysian Foreign Minister Anifah Aman, the Malaysian Government was always willing to waive immunity and to allow Rizalman to be tried in New Zealand. Details of the case were not divulged to the general public until early July 2014. Following his return to Malaysia, Rizalman was checked into a Malaysian military hospital for psychiatric evaluation. He was also scheduled to face a military board of inquiry and potentially a court-martial.

=== Media coverage ===
On 30 June 2014, the New Zealand Prime Minister John Key confirmed that an unidentified foreign diplomat had departed New Zealand following a police investigation into an alleged sexual assault that had occurred in Wellington in May 2014. The New Zealand Ministry of Foreign Affairs and Trade requested that the diplomat's home country waive his diplomatic immunity but the request was refused. Following an Official Information request filed by Fairfax Media on 1 July 2014, the New Zealand Government released Rizalman's identity and details of the case to the New Zealand public. The New Zealand Government also released documents which said that the Malaysian Government had refused to waive diplomatic immunity in the alleged rape case and had sought to have the charges dropped and the case sealed. This contradicted a statement by the Malaysian Foreign Minister Anifah Aman that New Zealand had allowed Rizalman to invoke his diplomatic immunity and to return to Malaysia.

Key also assured the Malaysian Government that Rizalman would receive a fair trial in New Zealand and that there was no danger to his life, stressing that New Zealand had already abolished the death penalty. On 2 July 2014, the Malaysian Government confirmed it would return Rizalman to Malaysia to face charges. The New Zealand Police also confirmed that Rizalman was being charged with burglary and assault with intent, offences which carry a jail term of ten years. News reports of the Rizalman case in New Zealand sparked public criticism of the Fifth National Government for allowing the diplomat to return to his home country. Meanwhile, the Malaysian Government was criticised by the opposition and Malaysian activists for protecting an alleged rapist.

On 9 July 2014, it was reported that the alleged rape victim, Tania Billingsley, had voluntarily waived her right to name suppression by appearing on the New Zealand television channel 3 News's 3rd Degree Programme. She demanded that the Minister of Foreign Affairs Murray McCully apologise to her for the Government's handling of the case. The Ministry of Foreign Affairs and Trade was also criticised for mishandling the Rizalman case by sending the Malaysian Government confusing signals which gave the impression that the New Zealand Government was willing to allow Rizalman to return to Malaysia. This contradicted the Prime Minister's official position that Rizalman should face justice in New Zealand. John Allen, the Secretary of Foreign Affairs and Trade, also apologised to Billingsley on behalf of the Ministry.

The right-wing New Zealand blogger Cameron Slater drew controversy within the New Zealand blogosphere for speculating on his blog Whale Oil that the alleged sexual assault case had resulted from a break-up between Rizalman and Billingsley. Slater also criticised the Green Party MP Jan Logie for supporting Billingsley in her criticism of the Government's handling of the case. In response, the left-wing blogger Martyn Bradbury criticised Slater for resorting to victim blaming.

=== Extradition to New Zealand ===
On 3 October 2014, the New Zealand Government formally applied for Rizalman's extradition with the Malaysian authorities. The application was heard and granted by the Malaysian Sessions Court on 16 October 2014. According to Prime Minister John Key, the extradition process was complicated by the lack of an extradition agreement between Malaysia and New Zealand but he also stressed that lawyers from both countries were working hard to speed up the extradition process. On 24 October 2014, the Malaysian Foreign Ministry confirmed that Rizalman had boarded a Malaysia Airlines flight from Kuala Lumpur International Airport to Auckland on Friday morning. He was escorted by two New Zealand police officers and two Malaysian Defence Ministry officials. According to The Star newspaper, Rizalman had expressed his wish to voluntarily return to New Zealand.

=== Legal proceedings ===
After an overnight stay in Auckland, Rizalman appeared in the Wellington District Court on 25 October 2014. His lawyer Donald Stevens, QC did not apply for bail and Rizalman was remanded in custody to reappear on 28 October 2014. The presiding Justice of the peace, Hewitt Humphrey, allowed the media to film and record the proceedings, but not the defendant. On 28 October 2014, Judge Arthur Tomkins granted Rizalman bail to a temporary, undisclosed location but imposed several restrictions including the surrender of his passport, an overnight curfew, not contacting the alleged victim Tania Billingsley, and travel restrictions. He was ordered to reappear the following week to formalise bail conditions. Judge Tomkins also granted the media permission to film and record Rizalman during the hearing.

On 3 November 2014, Rizalman successfully applied to have his bail address changed at the Wellington District Court. Judge Bruce Davidson also extended the defendant's curfew hours from 10pm–7am to 7pm–7am. He reappeared in court on 26 November 2014 to enter a plea on the two charges of burglary and assault with intent to commit rape. The Malaysian Deputy Foreign Minister, Datuk Hamzah Zainudin expressed his confidence that Rizalman would receive a fair hearing in New Zealand, stating that the two countries shared "clear and solid legal principles and processes." On 21 November 2014, Rizalman pleaded not guilty to the charges he was facing. He elected for a trial by jury and returned to the Wellington District Court on 19 February 2015. On 2 December 2014, Rizalman applied to have his bail conditions relaxed. This appeal was denied by the Wellington District Court on 3 December for reasons that were suppressed.

On 19 February 2015, Rizalman made a brief appearance in the Wellington court where he was remanded for trial. He was scheduled to reappear in court in April 2015. On 10 March 2015, several New Zealand news media reported that Rizalman was scheduled to be tried before the High Court in Wellington in November 2015.

On 30 November 2015 Rizalman pleaded guilty to a charge of indecent assault. Related charges of assault and burglary were then dropped. Following his guilty plea, Rizalman attended a disputed facts hearing on 4 December. During the hearing, Rizalman admitted defecating outside Billingsley's house and entering the building without his pants or underwear. However, he denied the Crown prosecutor Grant Burston's assertion that it was part of a black magic ritual to put a charm on her and claimed that he had to make an emergency toilet stop. In addition, Rizalman admitted that he was a long-time consumer of cannabis and had bought high-strength cannabis while stationed as a diplomat in New Zealand. His defence lawyer Donald Stevens also alleged that Rizalman's behaviour during that night was influenced by extenuating circumstances including mental illness, which was contested by the prosecution.

On 15 December 2015, Justice David Collins accepted the Crown's contention that Rizalman had a sexual motive when following Billingsley to her Wellington home. In addition, the judge also ordered for a pre-sentence report and another report to assess Rizalman's suitability for home detention, which could be served at the Malaysian High Commission in Wellington. On 4 February 2016, Rizalman was sentenced to nine months' home detention. He served his sentence at a house in Wellington instead of the Malaysian High Commission. Rizalman's sentencing was criticised by the victim Tania Billingsley, who described it as a "kick in the guts". She also criticised the shortness of his home detention term and the lack of treatment for his sexual offending.

On 4 November 2016, Rizalman was deported back to Malaysia after completing his sentence.

=== Ministerial inquiry ===
As a result of the Rizalman-Billingsley case, the New Zealand Ministry of Foreign Affairs and Trade (MFAT) was criticised for allowing Rizalman to return to Malaysia rather than face charges in New Zealand. MFAT's handling of the case was the subject of a Ministerial Inquiry led by the former Treasury Secretary John Whitehead. On 8 November 2014, it was reported that MFAT's Deputy Director of Protocol, Mary Oliver, had resigned from her job due to criticism from the Prime Minister over her handling of the case. On 16 December 2014, John Whitehead's Ministerial Inquiry released a critical report which outlined 21 "specific recommendations for procedural changes designed to ensure that we have no repetition of these events." It was also reported that MFAT's Director of Protocol Caroline Bilkey had relinquished her position and reassigned as New Zealand's new Ambassador to Brazil. On 5 February 2016, the Foreign Minister Murray McCully confirmed that these 21 procedural changes had since been fully implemented by MFAT. A copy of the email from MFAT's protocol division that had been blamed for the confusion regarding Rizalman's return to Malaysia was also released on the news website stuff.co.nz.

== See also ==
- Malaysia–New Zealand relations
