= Mac Price =

New Zealand diplomat

Macalister "Mac" Price (25 May 1948 – 8 January 2003) was a New Zealand diplomat. He held diplomatic postings in Japan, Australia, Indonesia, the South Pacific, Samoa, and Malaysia.

Price graduated with a master's degree in Political Science from the University of Auckland, and was editor of student magazine Craccum in 1968.

He was a New Zealand negotiator for the CER negotiations during a posting in Canberra from 1979–1983, and served in senior Foreign Affairs postings in Wellington before his posting in Jakarta from 1988–1991. From 1991–1994, Price was New Zealand's Consul-General to New Caledonia and French Polynesia, and chaired the South Pacific Commission's Management Committee during a period of structural reform of the organisation.

In 1999, Price became New Zealand's High Commissioner to Samoa, and was present when Samoan Cabinet Minister Luagalau Kamu was assassinated at a Samoan political rally. He was instrumental in providing New Zealand assistance to ensure political calm was restored to Samoa, and in the subsequent trial of those involved in the assassination plot.

In 2001, Price became New Zealand's High Commissioner to Malaysia.

He died in January 2023 while on posting after a brief illness.
