= Charles Bennett (high commissioner) =

New Zealand diplomat (1913–1998)

Sir Charles Bennett DSO PMN
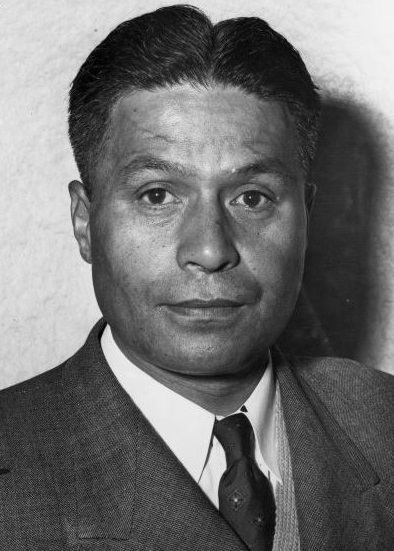

23rd President of the Labour Party
- In office 8 May 1973 – 11 May 1976
- Vice President: Eddie Isbey; Gerald O'Brien
- Preceded by: Bill Rowling
- Succeeded by: Arthur Faulkner

2nd High Commissioner to Malaya
- In office 30 January 1959 – 21 May 1963
- Prime Minister: Walter Nash; Keith Holyoake
- Preceded by: Foss Shanahan
- Succeeded by: Hunter Wade

Personal details
- Born: 27 July 1913 Rotorua, New Zealand
- Died: 26 November 1998 (aged 85) Tauranga, New Zealand
- Party: Labour
- Relatives: Frederick Bennett (father); Manuhuia Bennett (brother)
- Education: Canterbury University College

Sir Charles Moihi Te Arawaka Bennett DSO PMN (27 July 1913 – 26 November 1998) was a New Zealand broadcaster, military leader, public servant, and high commissioner to the Federation of Malaya (1959–1963). Of Māori descent, he identified with the Ngāti Pikiao and Ngāti Whakaue iwi.

== Early life ==
Bennett was born in Rotorua, New Zealand, on 27 July 1913, one of 19 children of Frederick Augustus Bennett of Ngāti Whakaue of Te Arawa, who became first Anglican Māori bishop of Aotearoa, and his second wife, Arihia Ngarangioue (Rangioue) Hemana (or Pokiha).

From the age of six months to thirteen years Charles was raised by his grandparents at Maketu. He won a scholarship to Te Aute College, where he was a distinguished student, head prefect and footballer. He obtained a BA in 1936 from Canterbury University College.

== World War II ==
=== Greece and Crete ===
Charles Bennett joined the 28th (Maori) Battalion at the outbreak of war in 1939. He underwent officer training at Trentham Military Camp, embarking overseas in May 1940 as a second lieutenant in B Company. On Lieutenant-Colonel George Dittmer's staff he fought in Greece and Crete. He led an intelligence unit responsible for reconnaissance, speaking on the radio in Maori. In November 1941 Bennett was promoted to captain.

=== North Africa ===
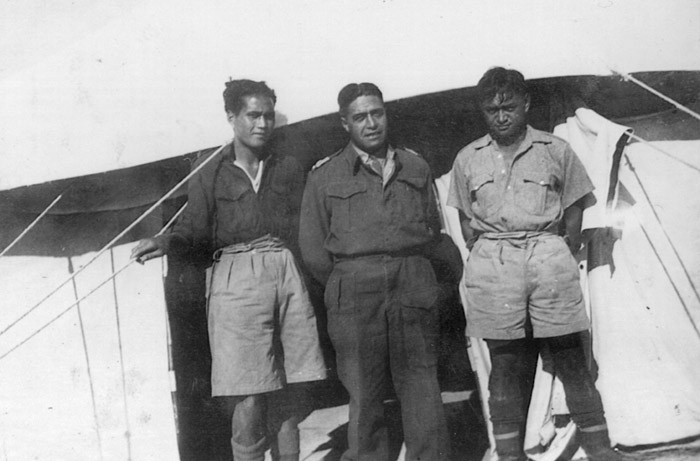
Colonel Charles Bennett (centre), North Africa, c.1942.

By October 1942 Bennett was a major commanding B Company. Early in November his two superiors were wounded in fighting near Tel el Aqqaqir, and Bennett then commanded the Māori Battalion, being promoted lieutenant-colonel (the youngest battalion commander in the Second New Zealand Expeditionary Force).

In March 1943 at Tebaga Gap, Tunisia, Bennett ordered a successful attack on Point 209 (Hikurangi to the Māori) which resulted in Lieutenant Te Moananui-a-Kiwa Ngarimu being awarded a posthumous VC, and Bennett the DSO.

In April, during the fighting at Takrouna and Djebel Berda, Bennett was severely wounded by a mine and was invalided home. His recovery took three years, and left him lame.

== Post-war ==
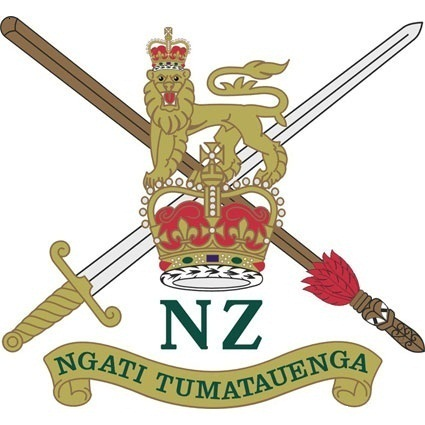
Crest of the New Zealand Army, with the second sword swapped for a taiaha in recognition of Bennett's contributions

With Major-General Howard Kippenberger Bennett worked on the Māori Battalion's history with the War History Branch of the Department of Internal Affairs. He became an interpreter at Internal Affairs.

On 10 October 1947, in Wellington, Bennett married Elizabeth May Richardson (née Steward). They had no children, but he regarded her two children as his own.

Bennett won a University of Oxford scholarship from the Ngarimu VC and 28th (Māori) Battalion Memorial Scholarship Fund to read for a doctorate on the problems of cultural adjustment of the Māori people. Although the thesis was not completed, in January 1959 he became New Zealand's high commissioner to the Federation of Malaya (later Malaysia). In 1963, he was made an honorary Commander of the Order of the Defender of the Realm by the Malay government.

Bennett was president of the Labour Party from 1973 to 1976, and stood for Labour in the Rotorua electorate in the 1969 general election.

Bennett was awarded an honorary doctorate (LL.D.) from the University of Canterbury in 1973. In the 1975 Queen's Birthday Honours, he was appointed a Knight Bachelor, for public services, especially to the Māori people, and in 1990 he received the New Zealand 1990 Commemoration Medal. He was a patron of the Electoral Reform Coalition.

Bennett died in Tauranga on 26 November 1998. He was survived by his wife and her two children. During the tangihanga, the traditional Māori funeral rite, the New Zealand Defence Force announced that their crest would be changed from the traditional two crossed swords to a sword crossed with a taiaha, the traditional Māori weapon, in Bennett's honour.

== Honours ==
- United Kingdom
  - Reception of Distinguished Service Order (DSO) (1943)
- Malaya
  - Honorary Commander of the Order of the Defender of the Realm (P.M.N. (K)) – Tan Sri (1963)

Party political offices
Preceded by Bill Rowling	President of the Labour Party; 1973–1976	Succeeded by Arthur Faulkner
Diplomatic posts
Preceded by Foss Shanahan	High Commissioner to Malaya; 1959–1963	Succeeded by Hunter Wade
