= List of high commissioners of New Zealand to Malaysia =

High Commissioner of New Zealand to Malaysia
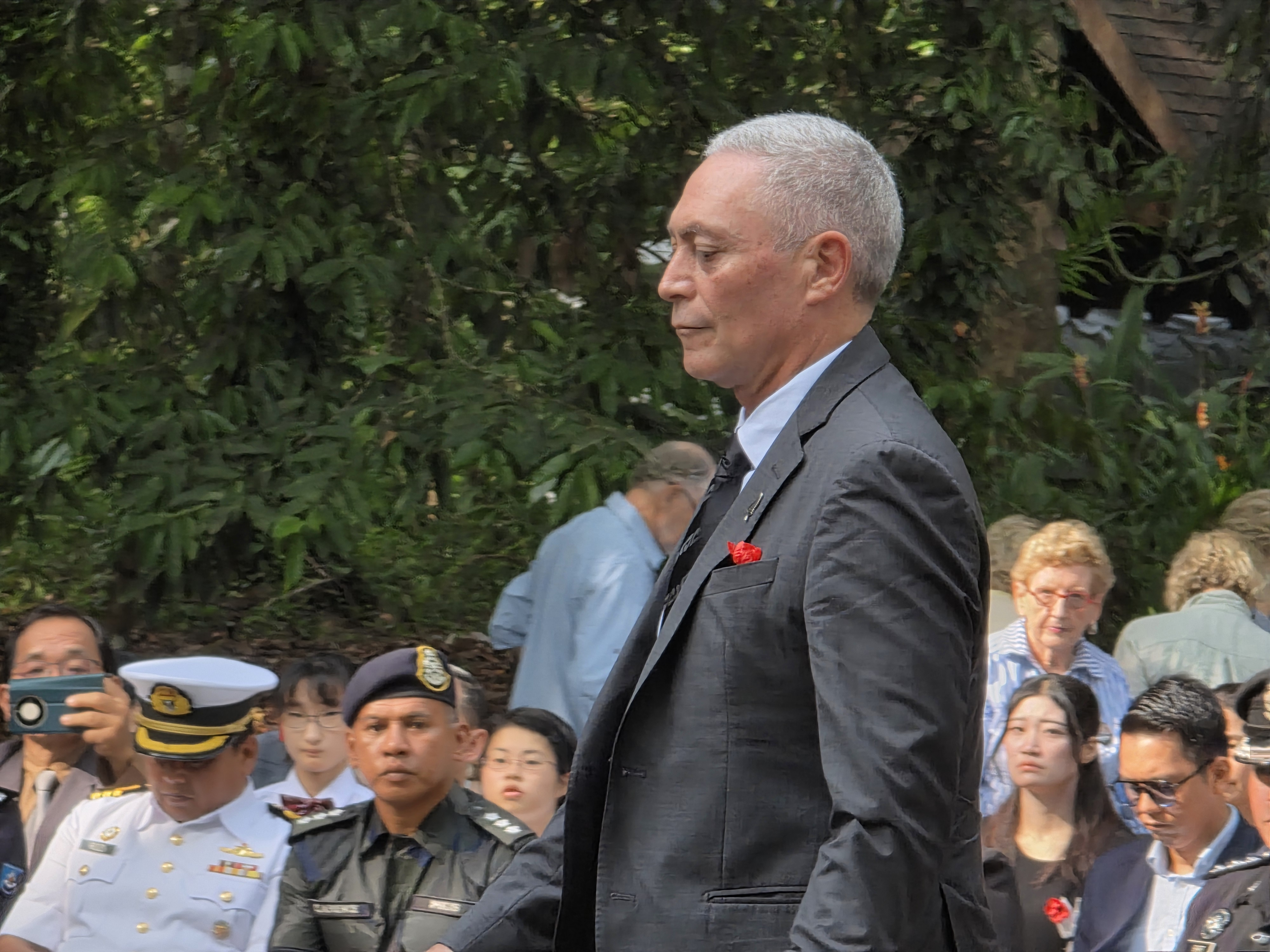
- Incumbent; Michael Wehi Mailetonga Walsh since 2025
- Style: His Excellency/Her Excellency
- Seat: Kuala Lumpur, Malaysia
- Inaugural holder: Hunter Wade
- Formation: 1963
- Website: www.mfat.govt.nz/en/countries-and-regions/south-east-asia/malaysia/new-zealand-high-commission

The high commissioner of New Zealand to Malaysia is the head of New Zealand's diplomatic mission to Malaysia. The position has the rank and status of an ambassador extraordinary and plenipotentiary and is based in the High Commission of New Zealand, Kuala Lumpur.

New Zealand has maintained a resident high commissioner in Malaysia since the country's formation in 1963. The high commissioner to Malaysia is concurrently accredited to Brunei Darussalam.

As fellow members of the Commonwealth of Nations, diplomatic relations between New Zealand and Malaysia are at governmental level, rather than between heads of state. Thus, the countries exchange high commissioners, rather than ambassadors.

== List of heads of mission ==
=== High commissioners to Malaysia ===
- Hunter Wade (1963–1967)
- Doug Zohrab (1967–1969)
- Dick Hutchens (1969–1973)
- Jim Weir (1973–1977)
- Jack Shepherd (1977–1979)
- Michael Mansfield (1979–1982)
- Harle Freeman-Greene (1982–1985)
- Ray Jermyn (1985–1990)
- Michael Chilton (1990–1994)
- Tim Hannah (1994–1997)
- Sarah Dennis (1997–2001)
- Mac Price (2001–2003)
- Geoff Randal (2003 - 2006)
- David Kersey (2006 - 2011)
- David Pine (2011 - 2014)
- John Subritzky (2015 - 2018)
- Hunter Nottage (2019 - 2020)
- Pam Dunn (2020 - 2024)
- Michael Wehi Mailetonga Walsh (2025–)

== See also ==
- Malaysia–New Zealand relations
