= List of ambassadors of New Zealand to Germany =

The Ambassador from New Zealand to Germany is New Zealand's foremost diplomatic representative in the Federal Republic of Germany, and in charge of New Zealand's diplomatic mission in Germany.

The embassy is located in Berlin, Germany's capital city. New Zealand has maintained a resident ambassador in Germany since 1966. The Ambassador to Germany is concurrently accredited to Switzerland, Liechtenstein the Czech Republic, Lithuania, Latvia, and Estonia.

== List of heads of mission ==
=== Ambassadors to Germany ===
- Reuel Lochore (1966–1969)
- Doug Zohrab (1969–1975)
- Hunter Wade (1975–1978)
- Basil Bolt (1978–1982)
- Jack Shepherd (1982–1985)
- Ted Farnon (1985–1990)
- Richard Grant (1990–1994)
- Gerry Thompson (1994–1998)
- Win Cochrane (1998–2003)
- Peter Hamilton (2003–2014)
- Rodney Harris (2014–2018)
- Rupert Holborow (2018–2022)
- Craig Hawke (2022–)
