= List of high commissioners of New Zealand to Australia =

High Commissioner of New Zealand to Australia
- Coat of Arms of New Zealand

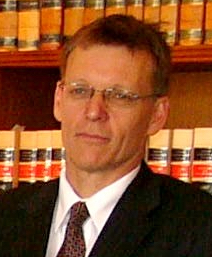
- Incumbent; Andrew Needs since 22 April 2024
- Style: His Excellency
- Appointer: Governor-General of New Zealand
- Term length: At His Majesty's Pleasure
- Inaugural holder: Carl Berendsen
- Formation: 27 February 1943

The high commissioner of New Zealand to Australia is New Zealand's foremost diplomatic representative in the Commonwealth of Australia, and in charge of New Zealand's diplomatic mission in Australia.

The high commission is located in Canberra, Australia's capital city. New Zealand has maintained a resident high commissioner in Australia since 1943.

As fellow members of the Commonwealth of Nations, diplomatic relations between New Zealand and Australia are at governmental level, rather than between heads of state. Thus, the countries exchange high commissioners, rather than ambassadors.

== List of heads of mission ==
=== High commissioners to Australia ===
The following individuals have held the office of high commissioner to Australia resident in Canberra:

No.	Name	Portrait	Term of office	
1	Carl Berendsen		27 February 1943	5 April 1944
2	Jim Barclay		5 April 1944	31 August 1950
3	Lisle Alderton		31 August 1950	1 April 1958
4	Fred Jones		1 April 1958	31 May 1961
5	Syd Johnston		31 May 1961	10 May 1963†
6	Jack Shepherd (acting)		11 May 1963	11 April 1964
7	Luke Hazlett		11 April 1964	10 August 1970
8	Arthur Yendell		10 August 1970	9 May 1973
9	Eric Chapman		9 May 1973	2 August 1976
10	Laurie Francis		2 August 1976	29 January 1985
11	Graham Ansell		29 January 1985	31 May 1989
12	Ted Woodfield		31 May 1989	13 June 1994
13	Graham Fortune		13 June 1994	3 March 1999
14	Simon Murdoch		3 March 1999	21 September 2002
15	Kate Lackey		21 September 2002	9 November 2006
16	John Larkindale		9 November 2006	4 May 2011
17	Martyn Dunne		4 May 2011	21 November 2013
18	Chris Seed		21 November 2013	7 December 2018
19	Annette King		7 December 2018	22 December 2023
20	Andrew Needs		22 April 2024	present
