= Arthur Yendell =

New Zealand politician

High Commissioner of New Zealand to Australia
- In office 1970–1973
- Monarch: Elizabeth II
- Prime Minister: Keith Holyoake; Jack Marshall; Norman Kirk
- Preceded by: Juke Hazlett
- Succeeded by: Eric Chapman

Personal details
- Born: Arthur James Yendell; 26 November 1910 England
- Died: 26 April 2004 (aged 93)
- Citizenship: New Zealand
- Party: National Party

Arthur James "Jim" Yendell (26 November 1910 – 26 May 2004) was a New Zealand businessman and diplomat. He was the High Commissioner of New Zealand to Australia from 1970 to 1973.

He was born in England and educated at Exeter. He owned retail furnishing and cabinet-making firms in Hamilton and had other farming and property interests.

He was active in the National Party from its earliest years; initially in the Waikato Junior Nationals in the 1940s and was on the South Auckland and Waikato Division then the Waikato Division executives. He was on the Dominion publicity committee, and unsuccessfully contested the party's presidency in 1966 against Ned Holt and in 1973 against George Chapman.

He married Dora Mary Fear in 1933.
