= New Zealand Young Labour =

Youth wing of the New Zealand Labour Party

New Zealand Young Labour Ngā Rangatahi ō Te Rōpū Reipa
- President: Kelly Ngan
- Vice President: Mukai Duder-Hura (Māori); Pagan Barbarich-Waikari (Women's); Sumita Singh (Regional)
- Preceded by: Labour Youth
- Headquarters: Wellington, New Zealand
- Ideology: Social democracy Democratic socialism
- Mother party: New Zealand Labour Party
- International affiliation: International Union of Socialist Youth
- Website: younglabour.org.nz

Young Labour (Māori: Ngā Rangatahi ō Te Rōpū Reipa) is the combined youth wing and student wing of the New Zealand Labour Party. It hosts an annual conference and holds a range of additional national events, including fringe sessions at the Labour Party's annual conference. All Labour Party members aged between 15 and 29 years old are members of Young Labour.

== Activities ==
Young Labour has worked on issues ranging from climate change and improved rental housing standards to liquor law reform and to opposing voluntary student membership. On the 15th of February 2022, the Conversion Practices Prohibition Legislation Bill passed its third and final reading. The Bill was brought to Parliament as a result of a joint petition presented by Young Labour and the Young Greens on the 14th of August, 2018. That petition initially resulted in a Members Bill placed in the ballot by Labour MP Marja Lubeck.

Although Young Labour is not an organisation which necessarily leads to a political career in Parliament, many of the Fifth Labour Government's Cabinet, including former Prime Minister Helen Clark and former Labour Party leader Phil Goff began their political activism in Young Labour, as did Sixth Labour Government prime ministers Jacinda Ardern and Chris Hipkins.

=== Conference ===
The Young Labour Conference, held annually, and doubling as the sector's annual general meeting, is the highest decision-making body of Young Labour. It elects the executive, alters the constitution and decides the sector's policy priorities for the current year. The conference also functions as a social and activism highlight on the Young Labour calendar, with addresses from Members of Parliament and activities such as canvassing commonly being a part of the programme.

=== Policy priorities ===
Each year Young Labour selects a number of policy priorities at its conference. These become the target for Young Labour members to ensure their passage at the annual conference of the Labour Party. These are advanced by Young Labour members playing an active role in debates at the regional and annual conferences of the party. In addition, Young Labour elects a representative to the Party's policy council who plays a role in ensuring Young Labour members' policy ideas are heard in the party.

=== Campaigns ===
Young Labour is an important part of the Labour Party's volunteer base at national and local elections. Young Labour members are involved in canvassing, election-day volunteering, and campaign managing across the country. Young Labour also runs public campaigns on certain political or policy issues that the sector deems important to young people. In addition, Young Labour runs an annual campaign leadership school to train members in the skills of executing successful political campaigns, and a summer school (open to the wider party) to have discussions and workshops on the wider direction of Labour in government and in opposition.

== Structure ==
=== Executive committee ===
The executive committee is elected annually at the Young Labour Conference. The executive committee is made up of a President, Māori Vice President, Women's vice president, Regional Vice President, Secretary, Treasurer, Communications Officer, International Secretary, Policy and Campaigns Officer, Policy Council Representative, and Youth vice president. The Youth vice president is an ex officio role on the committee, and sits on the Labour Party's governing body, New Zealand Council. The role is voted on by the party's membership at its annual conference.

=== Regional committee ===
The regional committee is elected annually at the Young Labour Conference and is made up of representatives from every region, as well as branch chairs from across the country. It is chaired by the regional vice president.

=== Sector committee ===
The sector committee is elected annually at the Young Labour Conference. The sector committee is chaired by the Māori vice president and women's vice president. It is made up of a rainbow organiser, Māori co-organisers, a women's organiser, a Pasifika organiser, a Kirk organiser (representing the disabled community), affiliates organiser (representing affiliated union members), rural and regional organiser, local government organiser, and multicultural organiser.

=== Regions and branches ===
In line with the organisation of the wider Labour Party, Young Labour is organised into six geographical regions for the purposes of campaigns and policy debate.

Within these regions, the primary unit of organisation are a number of special branches or university branches of the Labour Party. Some, like Princes Street Labour and VicLabour, are based around universities, whereas others are based in regional centres.

The current active branches are:

- Christchurch Young Labour, based in Canterbury
- Southern Young Labour, based in Otago and Southland
- Princes Street Labour, based in Auckland
- VicLabour, based in Wellington
- AUT Labour, based in the various Auckland University of Technology campuses
- Young Labour Auckland North, based on the North Shore
- Waikato Young Labour, based in Hamilton

== Young Labour Presidents ==
Young Labour Presidents
- 1999 — Moana Mackey
- 2000 — Moana Mackey
- 2001 — Michael Wallmannsberger
- 2002 — Jordan Carter
- 2003 — Michael Wood
- 2004 — Michael Wood
- 2005 — Vacant
- 2006 — Conor Roberts
- 2007 — James Coyle
- 2008 — Meg Bates
- 2009 — Eric Goddard
- 2010 — Patrick Leyland
- 2011 — Analiese Jackson
- 2012 — Ella Hardy
- 2013 — Shayne Misselbrook
- 2014 — Jessie Lipscombe
- 2015 — Katie Wilson
- 2016 — Katie Wilson
- 2016 — Kim Tanner
- 2017 — Nevada Lee-Mariu
- 2018 — Matt van Wijk
- 2019 — Sara Elgoran
- 2020 — Samantha Wood
- 2021 — Dan Harward Jones
- 2022 — Neihana Waitai
- 2023 — Niamh Prendergast
- 2024 — Ethan Reille
- 2025 — Fania Kapao
- 2026 — Kelly Ngan

== Sexual assault scandal ==
In February 2018, allegations of multiple sexual assaults at the Labour youth summer school in Waihi by a 20-year-old man emerged. The Police subsequently launched an investigation and laid five indecent assault charges against the alleged perpetrator, before withdrawing one of them, citing an administrative error. Labour Leader Jacinda Ardern, Prime Minister of New Zealand, was not informed of the allegations immediately, and learnt of them from a journalist moments after the story was published. The Labour Party itself was aware of the allegations, but failed to tell the party leader, Jacinda Ardern. As a result of the allegations the Labour Party suspended all youth party events and launched an investigation into the sexual assaults and allegations of underage drinking at Labour youth events. Once this report was completed, however, Ardern declined to release the report publicly, citing the charges still before the courts.

A Young Labour Summer School did not take place in 2019, which many commentators attributed to the controversy surrounding the previous year's summer camp. The alleged perpetrator pleaded not guilty to six charges of indecent assault in July 2018 and was granted interim name suppression. In September 2018, the Crown dropped two of these charges against the accused. On 2 September 2019, trial proceedings against the defendant began at the Auckland District Court. During the trial, the defence lawyer John Munro accused one of the victims of making up parts of history and exaggerating the incident. On 4 September 2019, the defendant pleaded guilty to two amended charges of assault against two young men, while the two remaining assault charges against the two women involved were dismissed.

== Candidates in the 2026 General Election ==
Several members of Young Labour have been confirmed as candidates in the 2026 New Zealand general election.

- Naisi Chen - Labour candidate for Auckland Central.
- Sophie Handford - Labour candidate for Kapiti.
- Rata Jamieson - Labour candidate for Ilam.
- Estefania Muller Pallarès - Labour candidate for Whangaparāoa.
- Dan Scott - Labour candidate for Tukituki.
- Fisher Wang - Labour candidate for Rotorua.

== Notable people ==
Prime Ministers & Leaders of the Opposition

- Jacinda Ardern - former Prime Minister of New Zealand and President of the International Union of Socialist Youth.
- Helen Clark – former Prime Minister of New Zealand and former Administrator of the United Nations Development Programme.
- Phil Goff – former Minister of Foreign Affairs and Minister of Defence, former Leader of the Opposition (NZ), former Mayor of Auckland, and former High Commissioner to the United Kingdom.
- Chris Hipkins - current Leader of the Opposition (NZ) and former Prime Minister of New Zealand.
- Mike Moore - former Prime Minister, former Director-General of the World Trade Organization, and former Ambassador to the United States.

Ministers

- Kiri Allan - former Minister of Justice and Minister of Conservation.
- Michael Bassett – former Minister of Health and Minister of Local Government, later aligned with ACT after leaving politics.
- Darren Hughes - former Minister of Statistics.
- Richard Prebble – former Minister of Police and Minister of Transport and Leader of the ACT Party.
- Judith Tizard – former Minister of Consumer Affairs and Minister for Auckland.
- Michael Wood – former Minister of Transport and Minister of Immigration.

Speakers of the House

- Jonathan Hunt – former Speaker of the House and High Commissioner to the United Kingdom.

Members of Parliament

- Charles Chauvel – former Labour List MP 2006–2013.
- Naisi Chen - former Labour List MP 2020–2023.
- Chris Flatt - current Labour List MP since 2026.
- Moana Mackey - former Labour List MP 2003–2014.
- Richard Northey – former MP for Eden 1984-1990, MP for Onehunga 1993–1996, Auckland City Councillor 1979-1980, 1983-1986, and Auckland Councillor 2010-2013.
- Arena Williams - current MP for Manurewa since 2020.

Local Government

- Sophie Handford - climate activist and former Kāpiti Coast District Councillor 2019–2025.
- Richard Hills - current Auckland Councillor since 2016.

Internal Officeholders

- Mike Williams - former President of the New Zealand Labour Party.

Other

- Shaneel Lal - LGBT rights activist.
- Rosslyn Noonan – formerly New Zealand's Human Rights Commissioner and a Wellington City Councillor.
- Mike Rann – former Premier of South Australia and National President of the Australian Labor Party.

== See also ==
- VicLabour
- Princes Street Labour
- New Zealand Labour Party
- New Zealand Union of Students' Associations
