= Princes Street Labour =

Political party branch in New Zealand

- Chairperson: Arthur Deschamps
- Founded: 1960
- Headquarters: University of Auckland, New Zealand
- Ideology: Social democracy
- Colours: Red and White
- Mother party: New Zealand Labour Party
- Website: Princes Street – Young Labour

Princes Street Labour is a branch of the New Zealand Labour Party in Auckland.

It is part of the Auckland Central Labour Electorate Committee. It is a "special branch" under the Labour Party constitution, which means that members may live outside the boundaries of Auckland Central electorate and do not have to be students. Membership is open to academics and alumni. Most members are students at the University of Auckland or Auckland University of Technology. Younger members of Princes Street Branch play a large role in Young Labour, the youth wing of the party.

Several members have gone on to prominent political positions including Helen Clark, who was Prime Minister from 1999 to 2008.

== Executive ==
The executive of the Branch is elected at each Annual General Meeting, in accordance with the Labour Party Constitution. Normally, executive members are students of the University of Auckland.

== History ==
The branch was set up by Labour activists including Jonathan Hunt in the 1960s while Norm Douglas was the member for Auckland Central.

== Notable members ==
Notable past members include:

- Michael Bassett – former Cabinet Minister and later aligned with ACT after leaving politics.
- Charles Chauvel – Member of Parliament 2006–13
- Helen Clark – former Prime Minister of New Zealand and current Administrator of the United Nations Development Programme.
- Phil Goff – former Minister of Trade and Minister of Defence, former leader of the Labour Party. Former Mayor of Auckland.
- Jonathan Hunt – former Speaker of the House and High Commissioner to London
- Rosslyn Noonan – formerly New Zealand's Human Rights Commissioner and a Wellington City Councillor.
- Richard Northey – former MP and Auckland City Councillor.
- Richard Prebble – former Cabinet Minister and ACT party leader.
- Mike Rann – former Premier of South Australia
- Judith Tizard – former Minister outside Cabinet
- Michael Wood – former MP and minister

== 2008 general election ==
Several current and former members stood for election at the 2008 New Zealand general election including:

- Kate Sutton – Labour candidate for Epsom
- Jordan Carter – Labour candidate for Hunua
- Conor Roberts – Labour candidate for Rodney and campaign manager for inaugural Greater Auckland Mayor Len Brown
- Hamish McCracken – Labour candidate for Northcote

== See also ==
- New Zealand Labour Party
- Young Labour (New Zealand)
