= Charles Chauvel =

Charles Chauvel may refer to:

- Charles Chauvel (filmmaker) (1897–1959), Australian filmmaker
- Charles Chauvel (politician) (born 1969), New Zealand politician
