= Trevor Mallard =

New Zealand politician (born 1954)

The Right Honourable Sir Trevor Mallard KNZM
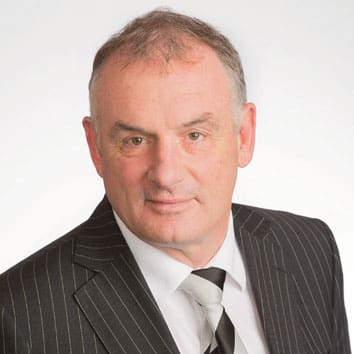

2nd Ambassador of New Zealand to Ireland
- In office 16 February 2023 – 19 August 2025
- Prime Minister: Chris Hipkins; Christopher Luxon
- Preceded by: Brad Burgess

30th Speaker of the New Zealand House of Representatives
- In office 7 November 2017 – 24 August 2022
- Monarch: Elizabeth II
- Governors-General: Patsy Reddy; Cindy Kiro
- Prime Minister: Jacinda Ardern
- Deputy: Anne Tolley (2017–2020); Adrian Rurawhe (2020–2022)
- Preceded by: David Carter
- Succeeded by: Adrian Rurawhe

13th Minister for the Environment
- In office 31 October 2007 – 19 November 2008
- Prime Minister: Helen Clark
- Preceded by: David Parker (acting); David Benson-Pope
- Succeeded by: Nick Smith

2nd Minister for Economic Development
- In office 19 October 2005 – 2 November 2007
- Prime Minister: Helen Clark
- Preceded by: Jim Anderton
- Succeeded by: Pete Hodgson

12th Minister for State Owned Enterprises
- In office 19 October 2005 – 19 November 2008
- Prime Minister: Helen Clark
- Preceded by: Paul Swain
- Succeeded by: Simon Power

41st Minister of Education
- In office 10 December 1999 – 19 October 2005
- Prime Minister: Helen Clark
- Preceded by: Nick Smith
- Succeeded by: Steve Maharey

Member of the New Zealand Parliament for Labour party list
- In office 23 September 2017 – 20 October 2022
- Succeeded by: Soraya Peke-Mason

Member of the New Zealand Parliament for Hutt South Pencarrow (1993–1996)
- In office 6 November 1993 – 23 September 2017
- Preceded by: Sonja Davies
- Succeeded by: Chris Bishop

Member of the New Zealand Parliament for Hamilton West
- In office 14 July 1984 – 27 October 1990
- Preceded by: Mike Minogue
- Succeeded by: Grant Thomas

Personal details
- Born: 17 June 1954 (age 72) Wellington, New Zealand
- Party: Labour
- Spouse(s): Stephanie (divorced) Jane Clifton (m. 2014)
- Relations: Beth Mallard (daughter)
- Occupation: Teacher

Sir Trevor Colin Mallard KNZM (born 17 June 1954) is a New Zealand politician and diplomat. Between February 2023 and August 2025, he served as Ambassador of New Zealand to Ireland. He was a Member of Parliament from 1984 to 1990 and again from 1993 to 2022. He served as Speaker of the New Zealand House of Representatives from 2017 until 2022.

Mallard was a Cabinet minister in the Fifth Labour Government of New Zealand (1999 to 2008). For six years, he was Minister of Education and Minister of State Services and held additional appointments as Minister for the Environment, Minister of Labour, Minister of Broadcasting, Minister for State Owned Enterprises, Minister for Sport and Recreation and Associate Minister of Finance. He has represented the electorates of Hamilton West, Pencarrow and Hutt South, and was a list member of Parliament between 2017 and 2022.

Mallard's five-year term as Speaker completed his parliamentary career. His move into a presiding officer role was likened to "the poacher turned gamekeeper." Mallard had had a reputation as an "attack dog" and "political battler" (he was once convicted of fighting in a public place after punching National MP Tau Henare at Parliament). His speakership was remarked on for its contribution to parliamentary culture change, including promoting a more family-friendly environment and removing the requirement for male MPs to wear ties. However, some of Mallard's comments and actions attracted criticism including in relation to the 2022 Wellington protests.

In February 2023, Mallard took up the role of New Zealand ambassador to Ireland. In mid August 2025, he was recalled as Ambassador by Foreign Minister Winston Peters.

== Education and teaching career ==
Mallard was born in Wellington, and attended Onslow College. After gaining a Bachelor of Commerce and Administration degree from Victoria University of Wellington in 1974, he trained as a teacher at the Wellington College of Education, gaining a Diploma in Teaching in 1976. He subsequently held a number of teaching jobs in Wellington and the King Country.

While teaching, Mallard became involved in the Post Primary Teachers' Association (PPTA), the national secondary school teachers' union. He was secretary of the PPTA's King Country branch from 1979 to 1984. In 1984, he gained a Diploma in Continuing Education from the University of Waikato.

== Labour Party activism ==
Mallard joined the Labour Party in 1972, while a university student. In 1977 he was arrested in Parliament's debating chamber during an anti-SIS bill protest, later appearing in court and the Supreme Court, and was banned from Parliament buildings for a time. He was arrested for disorderly behaviour outside the Springbok rugby team's Rotorua hotel during protests against their 1981 tour of New Zealand, but was found not guilty. In 1983 he unsuccessfully contested the Labour nomination for the new Tongariro electorate, losing to Noel Scott.

== Election to Parliament ==
New Zealand Parliament
Years	Term	Electorate	List	Party
1984–1987	41st	Hamilton West		Labour
1987–1990	42nd	Hamilton West		Labour
1993–1996	44th	Pencarrow		Labour
1996–1999	45th	Hutt South	none	Labour
1999–2002	46th	Hutt South	12	Labour
2002–2005	47th	Hutt South	12	Labour
2005–2008	48th	Hutt South	8	Labour
2008–2011	49th	Hutt South	14	Labour
2011–2014	50th	Hutt South	9	Labour
2014–2017	51st	Hutt South	none	Labour
2017–2020	52nd	List	33	Labour
2020–2022	53rd	List	11	Labour

=== Fourth Labour Government, 1984–1990 ===
He held a number of internal party positions until the election of 1984 when he defeated Mike Minogue to become the member of Parliament for Hamilton West. In his first term of Parliament, the Labour Party formed a new government and Mallard served as a member of the Justice and Law Reform committee and Regulations Review committee.

Mallard was re-elected in the 1987 election and the Labour government won a second term. Mallard was appointed junior government whip from 1987 to 1990, when he became senior whip. He lost his seat in the election of 1990.

=== Fourth National Government, 1993–1999 ===
After his election loss, Mallard returned to the Wellington area to live and work at parliament as an executive assistant to Mike Moore in the office of the Leader of the Opposition. He set up a new Labour Party branch in Wainuiomata and recruited 70 new members to the party. He then contested the Labour Party nomination in the seat of Pencarrow after Sonja Davies announced her retirement, winning the selection over Eastbourne-based polytechnic lecturer Tricia Thompson. At the 1993 election he was successful in winning the seat and re-entered parliament. The electorate was renamed Hutt South in 1996, and Mallard retained the seat until 2017 when he opted to become a list MP in a bid to become the Speaker of the House.

As a newly returned member of Parliament, Mallard supported Helen Clark in the 1993 Labour Party leadership contest. He became a senior member of the Labour Party under Clark's leadership and Michael Cullen described him as a member of Clark's inner circle, which also included Pete Hodgson, Steve Maharey, Phil Goff and Annette King. Clark appointed Mallard to spokesperson roles in portfolios for which he would later hold ministerial responsibility, including sport, state services, and education. As an opposition member of Parliament, Mallard was reappointed to the Justice and Law Reform committee (1993–1994) and appointed to the Government Administration committee (1993–1999).

== Fifth Labour Government, 1999–2008 ==
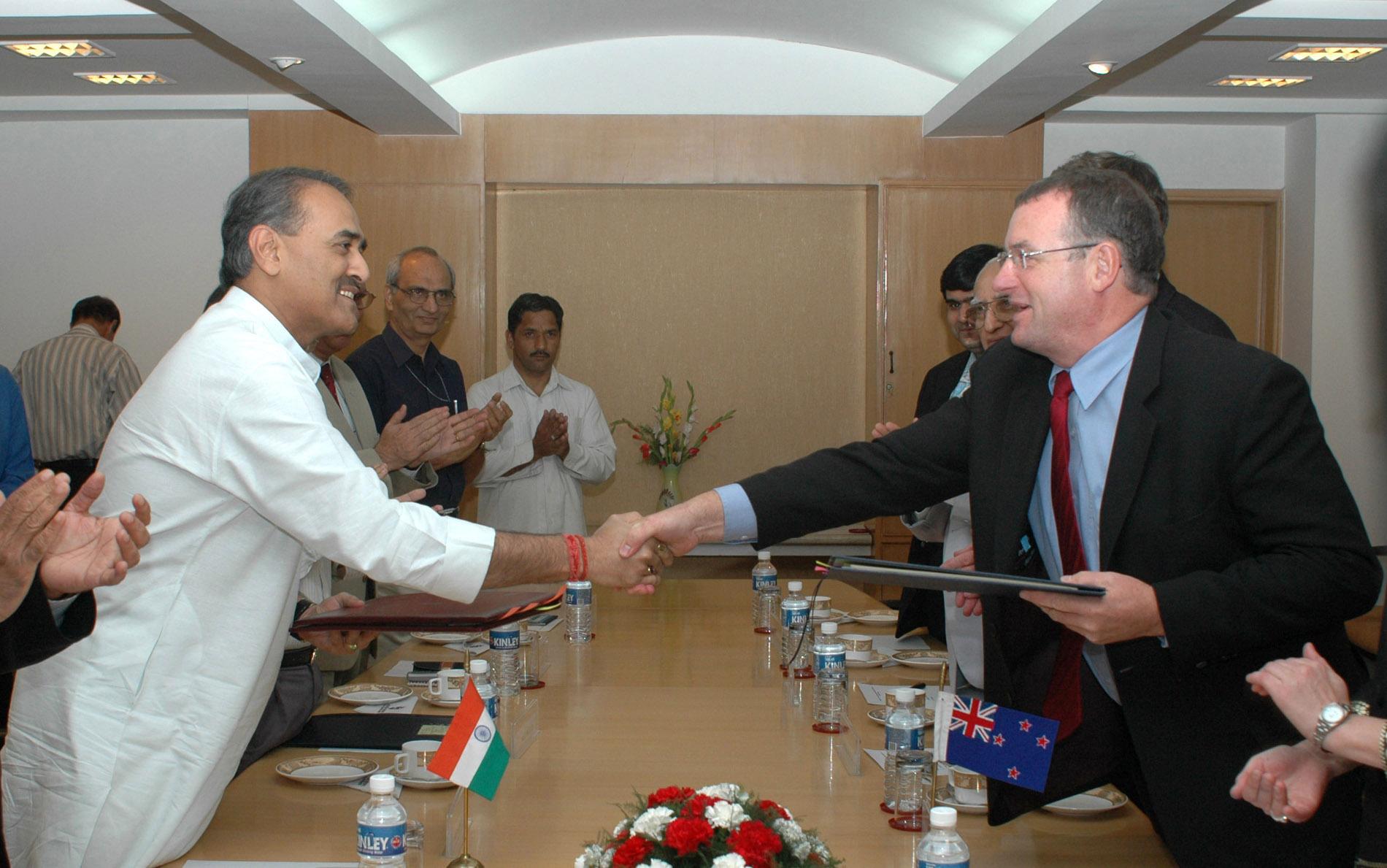
Mallard (right) as Economic Development Minister in New Delhi 2006, exchanging signed Air Services Agreement documents with Praful Patel

When Labour won the 1999 election, Mallard was appointed to Cabinet. He became Minister of Education, Minister of State Services, and Minister for Sport and Recreation. In connection with his Education role, he also became Minister Responsible for the Education Review Office, and in connection with his Sport role, he also became Minister for the America's Cup (New Zealand held the America's Cup at the time). In 2004, Mallard also became Co-ordinating Minister for Race Relations, and Minister of Energy.

In September 2006, Mallard was implicated in the resignation of National Party leader Don Brash after interjecting with an allegation in the House that Brash had engaged in an extramarital affair.

In an October 2007 cabinet reshuffle, he was reassigned to be the Minister for the Environment, the Minister of Labour, the Minister of Broadcasting, the Minister for State Owned Enterprises and the Associate Minister of Finance.

In October 2007, Mallard punched National Party MP Tau Henare in a scuffle that took place outside the debating chambers. It is speculated that this was a result of comments Henare made regarding a new relationship Mallard had formed. Mallard quickly apologised for his part in the altercation. He also publicly revealed that the woman with whom he had entered a new relationship was former world champion rower Brenda Lawson. Police declined to investigate but Graham McCready launched a private prosecution. Mallard pleaded guilty to fighting in a public place and agreed to pay $500 to the Salvation Army's Bridge drug and alcohol programme.

In May 2008, Mallard was warned by New Zealand's Chief Electoral Officer Robert Peden that signage on his electorate vehicle breached provisions of the controversial Electoral Finance Act and ordered him to update the signage to include an authorisation from party officials. However, the Chief Electoral Officer did not refer the matter to the New Zealand Police to prosecute as the matter was considered inconsequential.

=== Minister of Education ===
Mallard's handling of the education portfolio was strongly criticised by teachers' unions, including the PPTA. In his first term as minister, he was strongly criticised by teachers during a long-running strike action over salaries.

In his second term, he was criticised for a programme of school closures, that involved almost 90 schools across the country. The programme was eventually stopped after it faced heavy criticism from parents and teachers.

=== Minister of Sport and Recreation ===
In April 2002, Mallard made crude comments about inserting beer bottles into "uncomfortable places" of International Rugby Board chairman Vernon Pugh and Australian Rugby boss John O'Neill during a radio interview following the withdrawal of co-hosting rights for the 2003 Rugby World Cup. He later apologised saying he mixed up his passion for rugby with his role as Minister of Sport.

=== Minister of State Owned Enterprises ===
In 2006, Mallard announced that the government would introduce a policy that encouraged state-owned enterprises (SOEs) to expand into new business areas and diversify in order to build wealth for the country.

In 2007, Mallard said that the government was likely to be more stringent on state-owned enterprises in relation to social responsibility. Mallard explained that social responsibility is one of the core functions of SOEs but not enough was being done. The announcement was made following a number of incidents by SOEs, including a power disconnection by Mercury Energy that resulted in the death of Folole Muliaga, an individual who relied on an oxygen machine.

=== Minister of Labour ===
In 2008, Mallard implemented a new tool to help small businesses manage hazards. The goal of the project was to improve workplace health and safety.

=== Minister of Broadcasting ===
In July 2008, Mallard was critical of a TVNZ report into an assault by sports broadcaster Tony Veitch, saying that the report lacked key details, such as not mentioning that an assault took place.

== Opposition, 2008–2017 ==
Returning to opposition after the ascent of the Fifth National Government led by John Key in 2008, Mallard was Labour spokesperson for a range of portfolios including animal welfare (2014–2017), internal affairs (2013–2015) and education and labour (2008–2011). He was shadow leader of the House from 2011 to 2013 and was elected an assistant Speaker of the House in 2014.

In February 2012, Mallard was accused of ticket scalping on Trade Me when he sold four tickets to the Homegrown music festival for a $246 profit. As Minister of Economic Development in 2006, Mallard had initiated legislation, the Major Events Management Act 2007, prohibiting ticket scalping for major events (although Homegrown wasn't classified as a "major event" so wasn't covered). He later offered to refund the money he received for the tickets.

In May 2012, Mallard and fellow Labour MP Andrew Little were sued by National MP and Minister for the Accident Compensation Corporation (ACC) Judith Collins for defamation over comments they made on the public broadcaster Radio New Zealand linking her to the leak of an e-mail from Michelle Boag about an ACC privacy breach. After spending weeks avoiding Collins' legal team, Mallard received Collins' legal papers from a woman posing as a constituent. The case was settled by the parties involved following a High Court hearing in November 2012.

In December 2019, former Auditor-General Martin Matthews claimed that Mallard and other members of the Officers of Parliament committee, including then-Speaker David Carter, had pressured him to resign prior to the release of a critical report by Sir Martin Wevers into Matthews' handling of a NZ$725,000 fraud perpetrated by Ministry of Transport employee Joanne Harrison. At the time, Matthews had served as the head of the Ministry of Transport. Wevers' report ruled that Matthews was unsuitable for the position of Auditor-General since he had failed to detect Harrison's fraud earlier. Matthews disputed the report, alleging that it was full of errors and did not meet the threshold for removing Officers of Parliament. Matthews claimed that Mallard and his fellow MPs had denied him natural justice by not allowing him to respond to alleged inaccuracies in Wevers' report.

== Speaker of the House, 2017–2022 ==
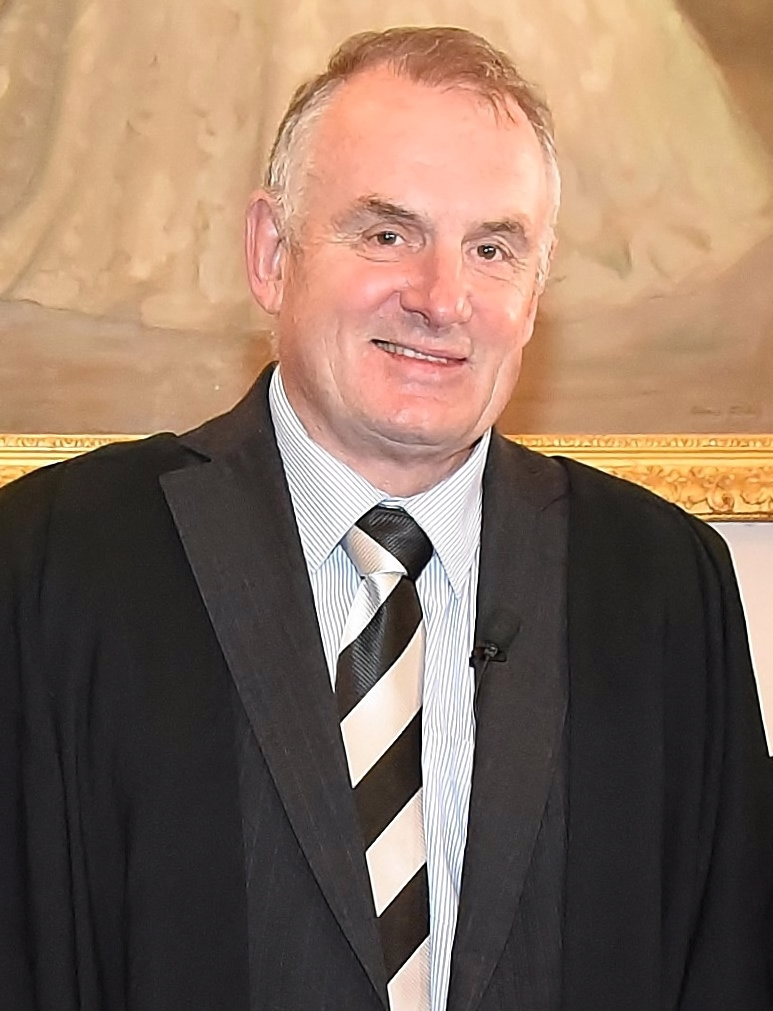
Mallard wearing his speaker's robes

Following the formation of a Labour-led coalition government with New Zealand First and the Green parties in October 2017, Mallard was elected as Speaker of the House on 7 November following some contention from the opposition National Party over whether several of the new MPs had been sworn in. He also served as Chairperson of several committees including the Business and Officers of Parliament select committees, and the Parliamentary Services Commission.

In November 2017, Mallard announced that the New Zealand Parliament would be becoming more "baby friendly" while posing for a photo with fellow Labour MP Willow-Jean Prime's baby Heeni. Such policies have included opening an atrium near the parliamentary chamber accessible to MPs' children, giving carers and spouses the same security clearances as MPs, opening the Parliamentary swimming pool to the families of MPs and staff, updating the family room to have baby-feeding and changing facilities, and a proposed play area on Parliament's lawn. On 22 August 2019, Mallard attracted media attention in New Zealand and abroad when he fed Labour MP Tāmati Coffey's infant son Tūtānekai Smith-Coffey during a parliamentary debate.

During the 2020 New Zealand general election, Mallard was re-elected to Parliament on the Labour Party list. When the new Parliament assembled on 25 November, he was re-elected as Speaker without opposition.

After canvassing the views of Members of Parliament in late 2020, Speaker Mallard decided that Parliament would not revise its business attire dress code which required male Members to wear a jacket and tie, as there was "very little support for a change," though he "personally loathed" ties. On 9 February 2021, Mallard ejected Māori Party Co-Leader Rawiri Waititi from parliamentary proceedings after he defied Parliament's business attire rule by wearing a Māori hei tiki neck tie instead of a formal necktie. On 10 February, Mallard announced that ties were no longer compulsory in Parliament following a Standing Orders Committee meeting where the majority voted in favour of the Māori Party's submission calling for the elimination of neckties as part of Parliament's business attire.

=== Rape allegation remarks, 2019–2020 ===
In late January 2020, Mallard was sued by a parliamentary staff member who alleged that the Speaker had defamed him by claiming in May 2019 that a rapist was working at Parliament. The staff member, who described these remarks as defamatory and untrue, hired Matthew McClelland QC and sought NZ$400,000 in general damages, NZ$50,000 in punitive damages and court costs. In response, Mallard hired the services of a Queen's Counsel from Kensington Swan.

On 8 December 2020, Mallard apologised to the staff member and it was announced that both parties considered the matter closed. On 11 December, The New Zealand Herald and Stuff reported that the matter had cost public funds NZ$333,000 (including an NZ$185,000 ex-gratia payment to the former staff member and more than $175,000 on legal fees). In response, National Party leader Judith Collins stated that her party had lost confidence in Mallard as Speaker of the House while the New Zealand Taxpayers' Union called on Mallard to reimburse taxpayers.

On 16 December 2020, Mallard appeared before the Governance and Administration Select Committee where he apologised for calling the former staff member a rapist. It was reported that the staff member was pursuing an employment case against the Parliamentary Service, that had cost NZ$37,500 in legal fees so far. A member of the Taxpayers' Union dressed in a pig's mascot costume also held a mock invoice during the proceedings before being asked to leave due to an objection by Labour MP Duncan Webb.

On 9 February 2021, the National Party unsuccessfully attempted to move a motion of no confidence in Speaker Mallard over the incident. In early May 2021, Mallard drew controversy and media attention when he used parliamentary privilege to claim that the parliamentary staff member whom he had falsely accused of rape committed sexual assault during an exchange with National MPs Chris Bishop and Michael Woodhouse. Prime Minister Ardern criticised Mallard's actions as "totally inappropriate" but rejected calls by the National and ACT parties to dismiss him from his position as Speaker.

=== 2022 Wellington protests ===
In mid–February 2022 a large group of mostly anti-mandate protesters established a makeshift camp outside the New Zealand Parliament to protest the Government's COVID-19 mitigation and vaccination policies. As Speaker of the House, Mallard was unable to order the protestors to be dispersed by force, so instead responded to their refusal to vacate Parliament's grounds by turning sprinklers on full and setting up loud speakers playing copyrighted music and pro-vaccination messages. Despite consulting local residents before he did so (to their approval), Mallard was criticised for his actions by the opposition National and ACT parties. National's COVID-19 spokesperson Chris Bishop criticised Mallard for antagonising the protesters further while ACT leader David Seymour remarked that Mallard "seems to be acting like a kid in a very adult situation."

On 16 February, the National Party said that it intended to lodge a motion of no confidence in Mallard over his handling of the protests and occupation in Wellington.

In early May 2022, Mallard, in his capacity as custodian of the parliamentary grounds, approved Parliament Security's issuing of 151 trespass notices against individuals who had participated in the Wellington anti-vaccine mandate protest. Five of these trespass notices were issued to former Members of Parliament; namely former National MP Matt King, New Zealand First leader Winston Peters, former ACT leader Rodney Hide, former Māori Party co-leader Marama Fox, and former NZ First list MP Darroch Ball. Following Peters' threat to seek a judicial review of the trespass notices and media coverage, Mallard withdrew the trespass notices against the five former MPs. In response to the trespass notices against the former MPs, the National and ACT parties renewed their calls for Mallard to be removed as Speaker of the House. Attorney General David Parker welcomed the withdrawal of the trespass notices against the MPs. Prime Minister Jacinda Ardern rejected calls to remove Mallard as Speaker and defended his decision to issue the trespass notices.

In late June 2025, lawyer Tudor Clee sued Mallard and Attorney-General Judith Collins on behalf of a child who participated in the 2022 Wellington protest. The plaintiff has sought a declaration that their rights were breached when Mallard played repetitive "bad" music over loudspeakers as well as NZ$40,000 in damages for three separate breaches. These breaches included two breaches of the Bill of Rights' right not to be subject to torture or cruel treatment, the right to freedom of association, and a third tort claim alleging that a public official abused their power. The case is expected to be heard at the Wellington High Court on 7 July. Mallard declined to comment on the case.

== Resignation ==
On 13 June 2022, Ardern confirmed that Mallard would resign from his position as Speaker of the House in mid-August 2022 to take up a diplomatic post in Europe. The Prime Minister also designated fellow Labour MP and Deputy Speaker Adrian Rurawhe as his successor. His resignation, along with that of Immigration and Broadcasting Minister Kris Faafoi, triggered a cabinet reshuffle within the Labour Government. Mallard's resignation announcement followed renewed criticism by the opposition National, Māori, and ACT parties over his decision to issue trespass notices against five former MPs.

On 24 August 2022, Mallard's resignation as Speaker of the House took effect. The day before, Foreign Minister Nanaia Mahuta formally announced his appointment as the second resident ambassador of New Zealand to Ireland, which he assumed in January 2023. Fellow Labour MP and Deputy Speaker Adrian Rurawhe was elected as the new Speaker of the House. During speeches following Rurawhe's election, former Labour MP Gaurav Sharma used parliamentary privilege to accuse Mallard of ignoring his concerns about bullying in Parliament and refusing to provide legal support for his case. Sharma also alleged that Mallard had informed the Labour Whips office about Sharma's complaint against the party and whips. Mallard denied Sharma's allegations.

Mallard gave his valedictory speech to Parliament on 20 October 2022, and his resignation as a list MP took effect at the end of that day.

== Diplomatic career, 2023–2025 ==
In mid October 2022, Newshub reported that Mallard's new position as New Zealand Ambassador to Ireland had a salary between NZ$180,000 and NZ$250,000. In addition, Mallard was entitled to accommodation and two trips home over the three-year appointment. In response, ACT Party leader David Seymour criticised Mallard's diplomatic appointment as an example of "bad behaviour" being rewarded.

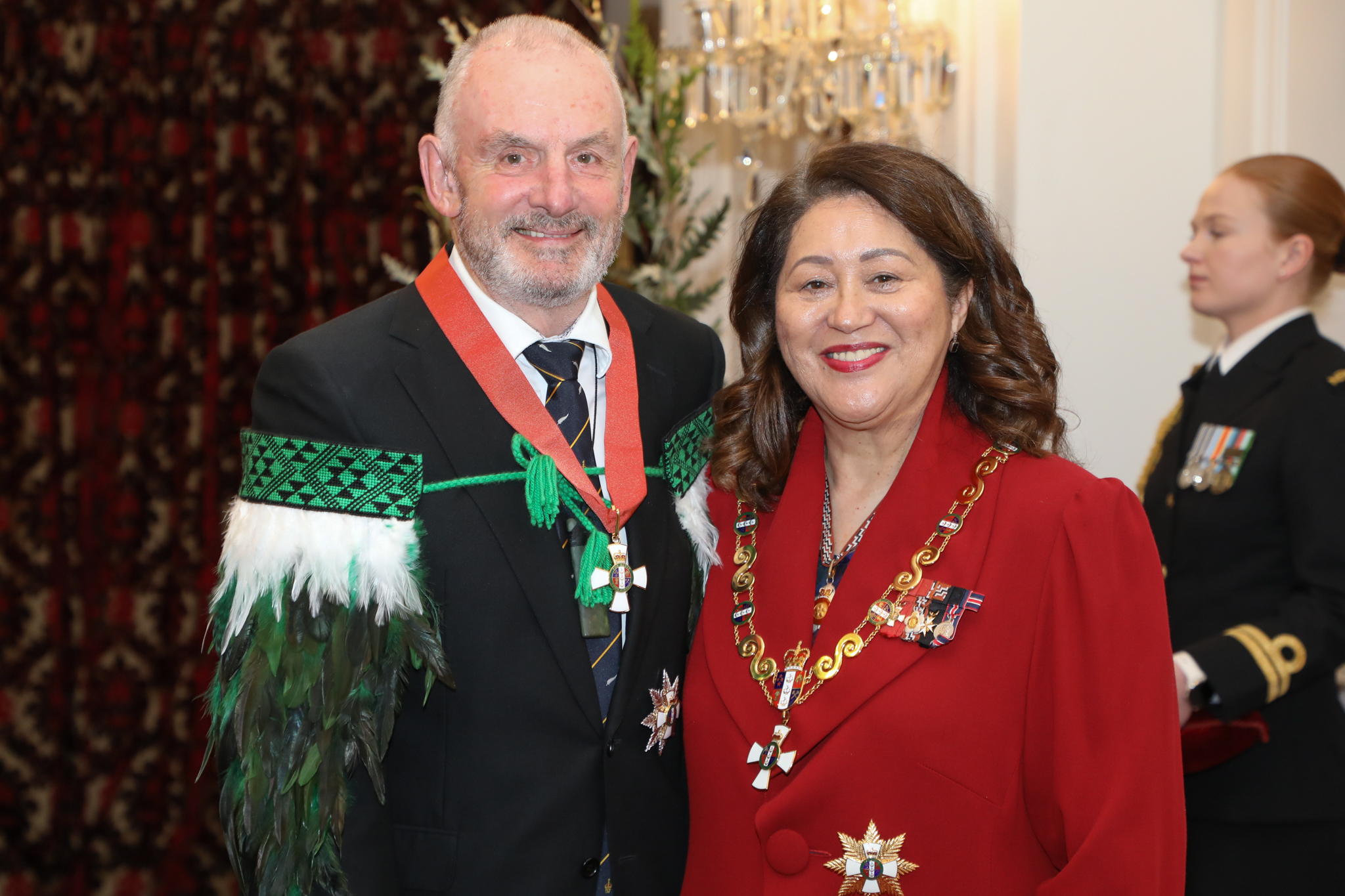
Mallard (left), after his investiture as a Knight Companion of the New Zealand Order of Merit by the governor-general, Cindy Kiro, at Government House, Wellington, on 21 May 2026

In the 2024 New Year Honours, Mallard was appointed a Knight Companion of the New Zealand Order of Merit, for services as a member of Parliament and as Speaker of the House of Representatives.

On 19 August 2025, Foreign Minister Winston Peters recalled Mallard from his position as Ambassador to Ireland for undisclosed reasons. Peters criticised Jacinda Ardern for appointing former politicians to diplomatic positions. He announced Angela Hassan-Sharp as the new designated Ambassador to Ireland.

== Personal life ==
Mallard announced his separation from wife Stephanie in June 2007 after 33 years of marriage. He has three children, one of whom is a Black Fern, Beth Mallard. On 29 December 2014, Mallard married journalist Jane Clifton. He is interested in outdoor recreation, including rugby and mountain biking.

== See also ==
- List of longest-serving members of the New Zealand Parliament
- Trevor (duck) – vagrant mallard duck in Niue named after Mallard

New Zealand Parliament
Preceded by Mike Minogue	Member of Parliament for Hamilton West; 1984–1990	Succeeded by Grant Thomas
Preceded by Sonja Davies	Member of Parliament for Pencarrow; 1993–1996	Constituency abolished
New constituency	Member of Parliament for Hutt South; 1996–2017	Succeeded by Chris Bishop
Preceded by David Carter	Speaker of the House of Representatives; 2017–2022	Succeeded by Adrian Rurawhe
Political offices
Preceded by Nick Smith	Minister of Education; 1999–2005	Succeeded by Steve Maharey
Preceded by Paul Swain	Minister for State Owned Enterprises; 2005–2008	Succeeded by Simon Power
Preceded by Jim Anderton	Minister for Economic Development; 2005–2007	Succeeded by Pete Hodgson
Preceded by Ruth Dyson	Minister for the Environment; 2007–2008	Succeeded by Nick Smith
Party political offices
Preceded by Margaret Austin	Senior Whip of the Labour Party; 1990	Succeeded by Jonathan Hunt
Diplomatic posts
Preceded by Brad Burgess	Ambassador of New Zealand to Ireland; 2023–2025	Succeeded by Angela Hassan-Sharp
Honorary titles
Preceded by Nick Smith	Father of the House; 2021–2022	Succeeded by Gerry Brownlee
