= It's Academic (New Zealand game show) =

New Zealand television quiz show

It's Academic title

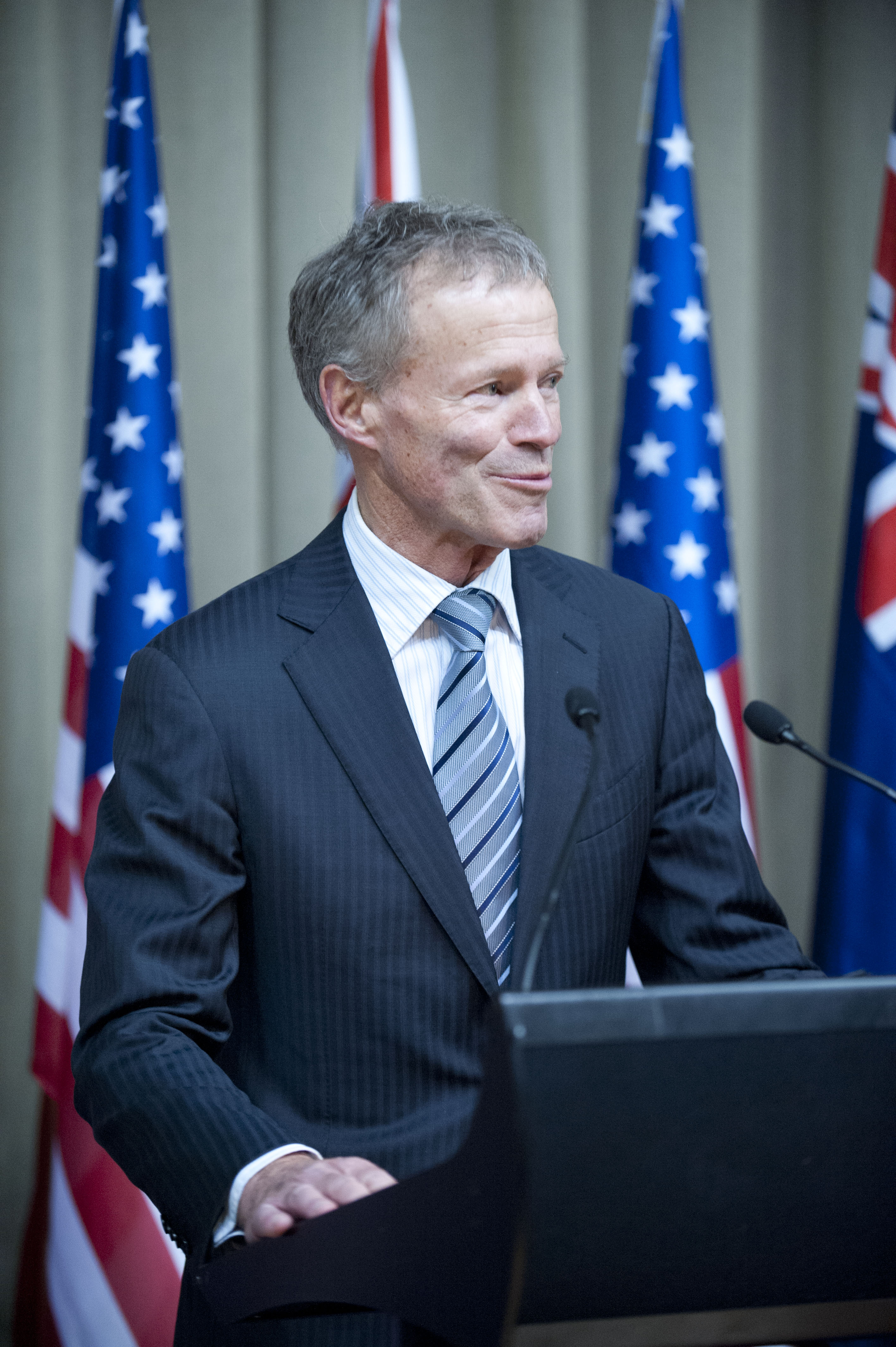
Quizmaster Lockwood Smith

It's Academic was a general knowledge quiz show for high school students in New Zealand, broadcast by TVNZ from 1981 until 1988. It's Academic was hosted by Lockwood Smith (who later became a member of the New Zealand Parliament, eventually serving as its speaker) and, later, John Hayden. The show was produced by Kevan Moore & Associates, an independent production house led by producer/director and ex-TV2 programming chief Kevan Moore, with Patrick Macaskill as adjudicator.

School teams of three pupils competed for digital watches, handheld calculators and sets of the Encyclopædia Britannica for their school. The quiz followed the format of its long-running American counterpart. The theme tune, 'Piano Parchment', was written as library music in 1968 by Johnny Pearson and was well known in New Zealand living rooms about the same time as the theme for BBC drama series All Creatures Great and Small.

== List of winning schools ==
- 1981: Onslow College, Wellington
- 1985: Takapuna Grammar School, Team-Sarah Ell, Erica Heppleston, Suzanne Nola
- 1988: Takapuna Grammar School, Team- Simon North, Lyall McMillan, Janine Pritchard
