= List of ambassadors of New Zealand to Ireland =

New Zealand ambassadors to Ireland

The ambassador from New Zealand to Ireland is New Zealand's foremost diplomatic representative in Ireland, and in charge of New Zealand's diplomatic mission in that country.

The embassy is located in Dublin, Ireland's capital city. New Zealand has maintained a resident ambassador in Ireland since 2018. Previously, the New Zealand high commissioner to the United Kingdom was also accredited as ambassador to Ireland.

== List of heads of mission ==
No.	Name	Portrait	Term of office	Notes
1	Brad Burgess		November 2018 – January 2023	
2	Trevor Mallard		January 2023 – August 2025	
3	Angela Hassan-Sharp		August 2025 — present	
