= Derek Leask =

New Zealand diplomat (1948–2025)

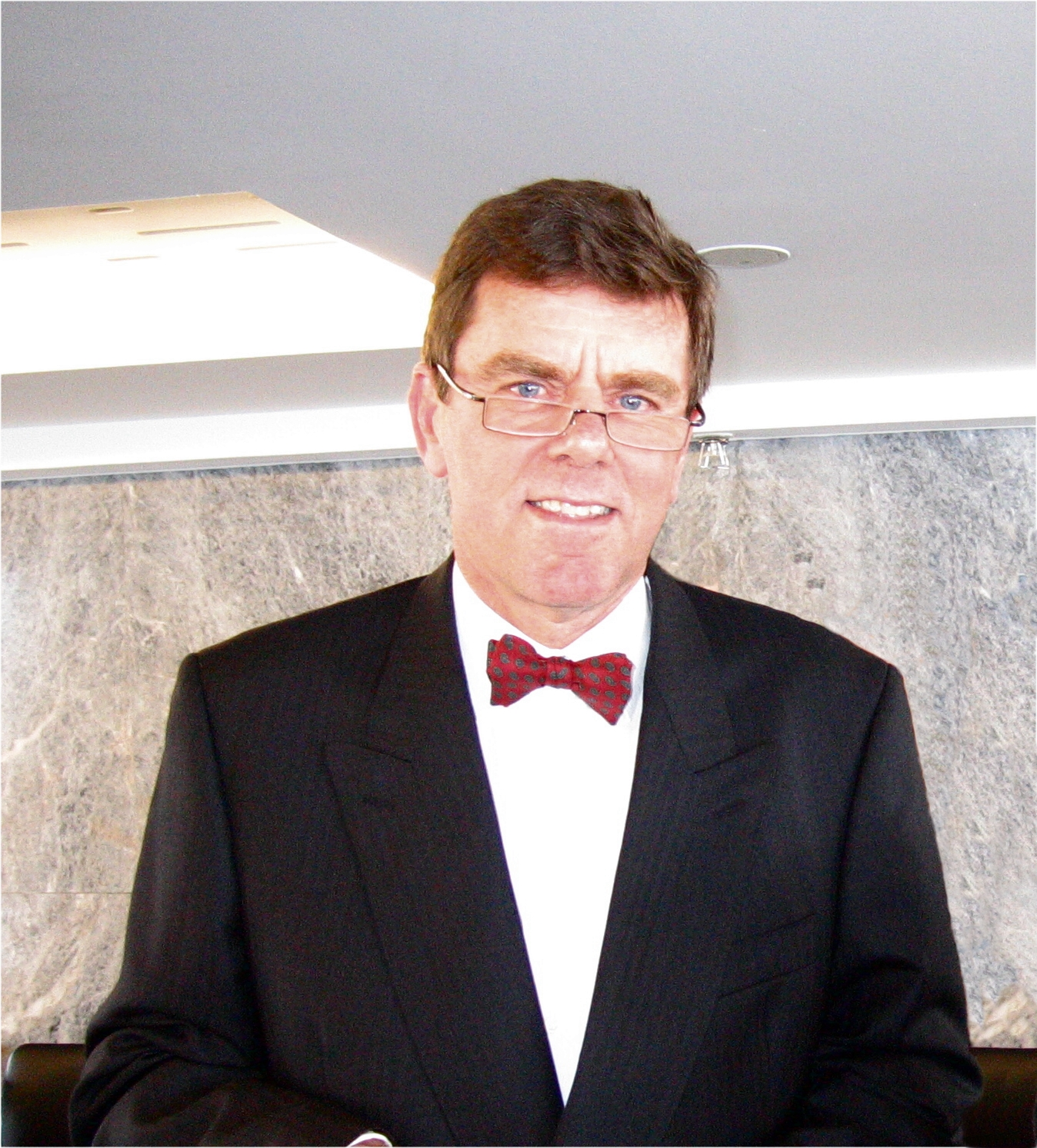
- Leask in 2008

25th High Commissioner from New Zealand to the United Kingdom
- In office March 2008 – February 2013
- Preceded by: Jonathan Hunt
- Succeeded by: Lockwood Smith

Personal details
- Born: Derek William Leask; 1948 Wellington, New Zealand
- Died: 15 November 2025 (aged 76–77)
- Education: Victoria University of Wellington; University of Canterbury
- Occupation: Public servant; diplomat

Derek William Leask (1948 – 15 November 2025) was a New Zealand diplomat and cartobibliographer. From March 2008 to February 2013, he was the High Commissioner from New Zealand to the United Kingdom, and concurrently accredited as Ambassador to Ireland and High Commissioner to Nigeria. Leask was a career diplomat, who joined the Ministry of Foreign Affairs in 1969. Before becoming Commissioner, he was Deputy Secretary at the Ministry of Foreign Affairs and Trade in Wellington. He served as Ambassador to the European Union in Brussels from 1994 to 1999, and was earlier posted to Suva, Ottawa and London, between 1985 and 1989.

== Early life and education ==
Leask was born in Wellington in 1948, and earned degrees from Victoria University of Wellington (BCA), and the University of Canterbury (MComm, Hons-Economics).

== High Commissioner to the United Kingdom ==
Minister of Foreign Affairs Winston Peters announced Leask would be the next High Commissioner in London on 22 November 2007, succeeding Jonathan Hunt. As High Commissioner, Leask attended the service for Edmund Hillary at St George's Chapel in Windsor Castle on 2 April 2008.

== Inquiry and vindication ==
Starting in 2012, Leask was connected to the leaking of documents from Ministry of Foreign Affairs and Trade. An inquiry led by Paula Rebstock was later found to be "flawed" in its dealings with Leask by an Ombudsman's report by Ron Paterson, which recommended Leask be paid legal costs and compensation.

== Cartographical historian ==
Leask's postings overseas allowed him to pursue his passion for researching the output of maps related to the New Zealand Wars conflicts between British settlers and native Maori in New Zealand between 1834 and 1884. He spent 35 years collecting copies of, and recording the details of, these maps. This cartobibliography of military and political mapping formed the basis for his 2-volume Atlas of the New Zealand Wars (Auckland University Press, 2025-). Volume 1 was published in April 2025, and volume two was sent to the publisher shortly before his death.

Leask is also the coauthor of Military Mapping in Australia, New Zealand and the SW Pacific, an entry in the fifth and final volume, Cartography in the Nineteenth Century, of the monumental History of Cartography Project due to be published by the University of Chicago Press in 2027.

== Death ==
Leask died on 15 November 2025.

Diplomatic posts
Preceded by Jonathan Hunt	High Commissioner of New Zealand to the United Kingdom; 2008–2013	Succeeded by Lockwood Smith
