= Lockwood Smith =

New Zealand politician and diplomat

The Right Honourable Sir Lockwood Smith KNZM
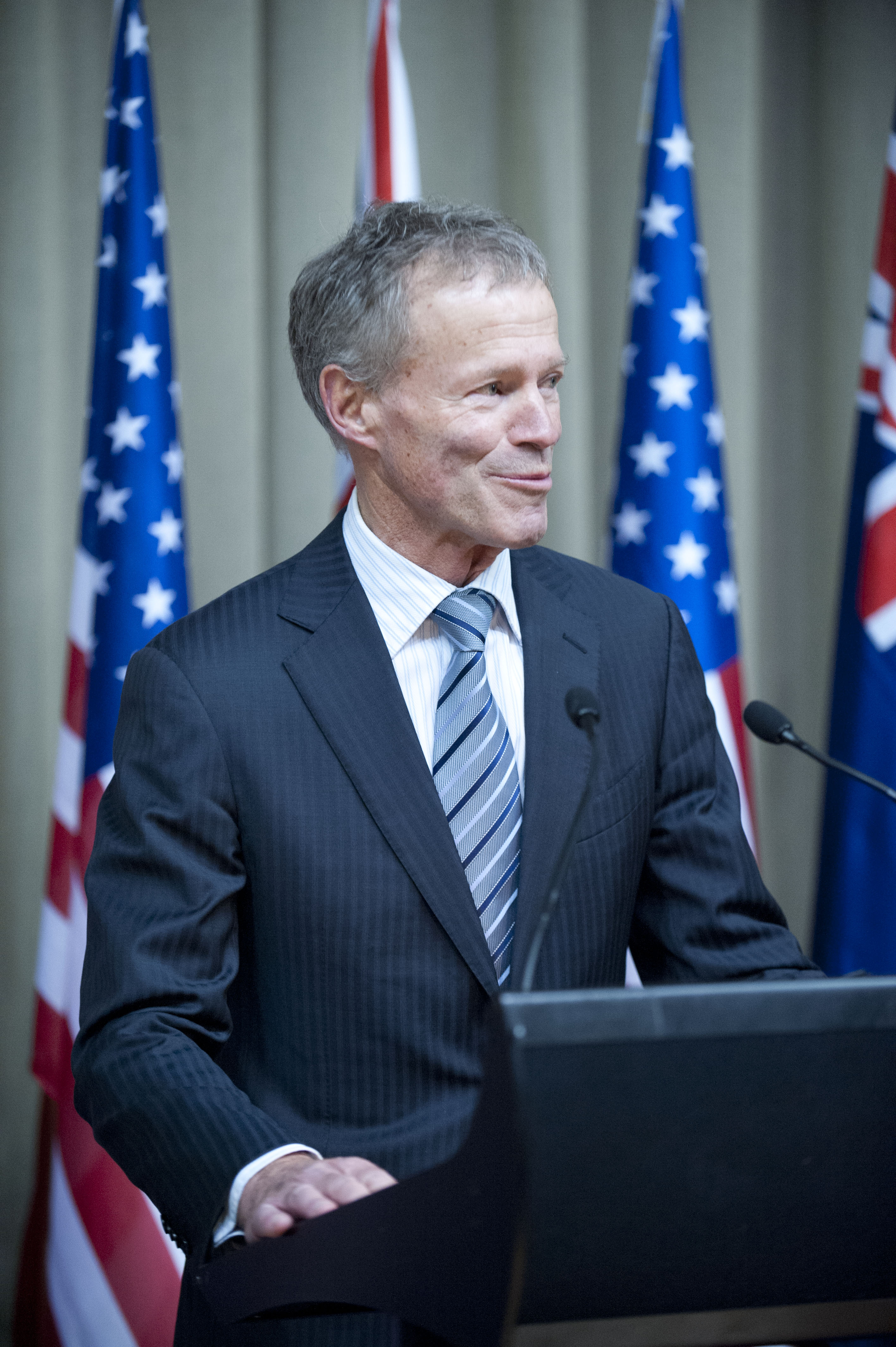
- Smith in 2012, speaking at the 70th anniversary of the arrival of US Forces in New Zealand

30th High Commissioner of New Zealand to the United Kingdom
- In office 25 March 2013 – 24 March 2017
- Monarch: Elizabeth II
- Prime Minister: John Key; Bill English
- Preceded by: Derek Leask
- Succeeded by: Sir Jerry Mateparae

28th Speaker of the New Zealand House of Representatives
- In office 8 December 2008 – 31 January 2013
- Prime Minister: John Key
- Preceded by: Margaret Wilson
- Succeeded by: David Carter

38th Minister of Education
- In office 2 November 1990 – 1 March 1996
- Prime Minister: Jim Bolger
- Preceded by: Phil Goff
- Succeeded by: Wyatt Creech

Member of the New Zealand Parliament for Kaipara
- In office 14 July 1984 – 12 October 1996
- Preceded by: Peter Wilkinson
- Succeeded by: electorate abolished

Member of the New Zealand Parliament for Rodney
- In office 12 October 1996 – 26 November 2011
- Preceded by: vacant (last held by Don McKinnon)
- Succeeded by: Mark Mitchell
- Majority: 15,635

Member of the New Zealand Parliament for National Party list
- In office 26 November 2011 – 14 February 2013
- Succeeded by: Aaron Gilmore (Note: Normally, list MPs do not have individual predecessors or successors, but Smith resigned during a sitting parliament and therefore was succeeded by Gilmore.)

Personal details
- Born: Alexander Lockwood Smith; 13 November 1948 (age 78) Paparoa, New Zealand
- Party: National
- Spouse: Alexandra Lang (m. 2009)
- Relations: Jason Smith (cousin)
- Scientific career
- Education: University of Adelaide
- Thesis: Intestinal protein turnover: a study of the nitrogenous transactions of the small intestinal mucosa in sheep (1979)

Sir Alexander Lockwood Smith KNZM (born 13 November 1948) is a New Zealand politician and diplomat who was High Commissioner of New Zealand to the United Kingdom from 2013 to 2017 and Speaker of the House of Representatives from 2008 to 2013.

Smith is a member of the New Zealand National Party and served as a Member of Parliament (MP) from 1984 until his retirement to pursue diplomatic roles in 2013. He represented the Kaipara and Rodney electorates and was briefly a list MP. In the Fourth National Government, he served as Minister of Education from 1990 to 1996 and later as Minister of Agriculture, Minister for International Trade, and Associate Minister of Finance.

== Early life ==
Smith was born on 13 November 1948 in Paparoa, Northland. He was educated at Ruawai District High School, and then Auckland Grammar School from 1961.

Smith studied at Massey University between 1966 and 1972, graduating with a Bachelor of Agricultural Science degree in 1970 and a Master of Agricultural Science degree in 1973. His master's thesis, titled Maize silage: a study of the nutritive value of ensiled Zea mays L. for growth in young cattle, was supervised by Al Rae and Arnold Davey. During his master's studies, Smith was a junior lecturer at Massey.

Awarded a Commonwealth Scholarship, Smith subsequently undertook doctoral studies in animal science at the University of Adelaide from 1973 to 1979, graduating PhD in 1980. His doctoral thesis was titled Intestinal protein turnover: a study of the nitrogenous transactions of the small intestinal mucosa in sheep. While in Adelaide, Smith also worked as a television presenter for Channel Nine Adelaide, and represented South Australia in rowing.

Before entering politics, Smith worked for the New Zealand Dairy Board as area marketing manager for Central and Southeast Asia between 1980 and 1984. From 1978 to 1984, he was also a television quizmaster for children's quiz shows The W Three Show and It's Academic on South Pacific Television and TVNZ.

In 1987, Smith established a Belgian Blue beef stud at Matakohe in Northland.

== Member of Parliament ==
New Zealand Parliament
Years	Term	Electorate	List	Party
1984–1987	41st	Kaipara		National
1987–1990	42nd	Kaipara		National
1990–1993	43rd	Kaipara		National
1993–1996	44th	Kaipara		National
1996–1999	45th	Rodney	8	National
1999–2002	46th	Rodney	5	National
2002–2005	47th	Rodney	11	National
2005–2008	48th	Rodney	9	National
2008–2011	49th	Rodney	12	National
2011–2013	50th	List	3	National

Smith was first elected in 1984 as the MP for Kaipara. He represented this electorate until it was abolished in 1996 during the shift to mixed-member proportional (MMP) representation. Following the 1996 election he was the representative for Rodney until the 2011 election where he stood as a list-only candidate and was elected as a list MP.

In 1990, Smith was awarded the New Zealand 1990 Commemoration Medal.

== Minister in the Fourth National Government ==
Smith served as Minister of Education from 1990 until 1996 in the Fourth National Government of New Zealand. During this period he implemented a number of changes to the tertiary education sector (universities and technical institutions). One high-profile change involved a radical increase in student fees, as recommended by the Todd Report, which the government had commissioned to address issues of funding.

As opposition education spokesman in 1990, Smith promised to remove the Labour Government's tertiary tuition fee of $1250, if elected. Once in office, he kept this promise on a technicality: he shifted the burden of charging fees for courses from the government to the institutions, who then had to charge even higher tuition fees due to decreased government funding.

Smith's term as Education Minister also saw the introduction of means-testing for student allowances, with the effect that students of middle-class parents became ineligible for allowances until they reached 25 years of age.

In 1996 Smith took up the Agriculture and Trade Negotiation portfolios: Wyatt Creech succeeded him as Education Minister. Smith also became Minister for International Trade and for Tourism, as well as holding responsibilities as Associate Minister of Finance, Associate Minister of Immigration (International Access and Processing), and Minister Responsible for Contact Energy Ltd.

As Trade Minister, Smith spearheaded New Zealand's efforts at the 1999 APEC negotiations. He successfully negotiated New Zealand's free-trade agreement with Singapore, which became the NZ – Singapore Closer Economic Partnership. At the WTO Ministerial in Seattle, he took part in efforts which later lead to the Doha Development Round.

== Opposition, 1999–2008 ==
In opposition, Smith held a number of spokesperson roles for the National Party, including those of Foreign Affairs, Commerce, and Immigration. In his role as Immigration spokesman, Smith challenged Mangere MP Taito Phillip Field over alleged impropriety in Field's dealings with constituents.

During the 2008 election campaign, on 22 October 2008, Smith made some comments in an interview with The Marlborough Express concerning seasonal Asian and Pacific workers that caused controversy. Regarding Pacific workers he said that some employers "are having to teach them things like how to use a toilet or shower..." And he said that for pruning trees: "some of the Asian workers have been more productive... because their hands are smaller." Maori Party co-leader Tariana Turia described these remarks as "racist", and the Prime Minister Helen Clark characterised them as "absolutely daft". Smith later stated that the media had presented his comments out of context, and that he had repeated the views of employers whom he had talked to; he expressed regret at any unintended offence taken. The parliamentary leader of the National Party, John Key, subsequently referred to this statement as an apology.

== Speaker of the House ==
Following the National Party's successes in the 2008 election, Members of Parliament unanimously elected Smith as Speaker of the House. Smith took a rather different approach from his predecessor, being more active in requiring ministers to provide answers to oral questions. Smith was re-elected as Speaker of the House again on 20 December 2011.

Smith was expected to retire from Parliament and to be appointed High Commissioner of New Zealand to the United Kingdom later in 2012, but stayed on until February 2013. He gave his valedictory speech on 13 February 2013; this was in fact his first speech in Parliament in four years, as Speakers perform an apolitical role. Reflecting on his nearly 30 years in Parliament, he listed voting against the Homosexual Law Reform Bill in 1986 as his biggest regret:

I faced the classic dilemma of voting according to my own judgement or the opinion of those I was elected to represent. As a new member, I opted for the latter and I've always regretted it.

Smith was appointed a Knight Companion of the New Zealand Order of Merit in the 2013 Birthday Honours for services as a Member of Parliament and as Speaker of the House of Representatives.

== High Commissioner to the United Kingdom ==
Smith began his term as High Commissioner of New Zealand to the United Kingdom on 25 March 2013, with a pōwhiri at New Zealand House in London. He stepped down from the role on 25 March 2017. He was replaced by Sir Jerry Mateparae, the former Governor-General.

== Personal life ==
On 4 July 2009 he married longtime partner, Alexandra Lang, in the Legislative Council Chamber of Parliament.

== Notes ==
Diplomatic posts
Preceded by Derek Leask	High Commissioner of New Zealand to the United Kingdom; 2013–2017	Succeeded by Sir Jerry Mateparae
Political offices
Preceded by Phil Goff	Minister of Education; 1990–1996	Succeeded by Wyatt Creech
Preceded by Margaret Wilson	Speaker of the New Zealand House of Representatives; 2008–2013	Succeeded by David Carter
New Zealand Parliament
Preceded by Peter Wilkinson	Member of Parliament for Kaipara; 1984–1996	Constituency abolished
Vacant Constituency recreated after abolition in 1987 Title last held by Don McKinnon	Member of Parliament for Rodney; 1996–2011	Succeeded by Mark Mitchell
