= Jonathan Hunt (New Zealand politician) =

New Zealand politician and diplomat (1938–2024)

The Right Honourable Jonathan Hunt ONZ
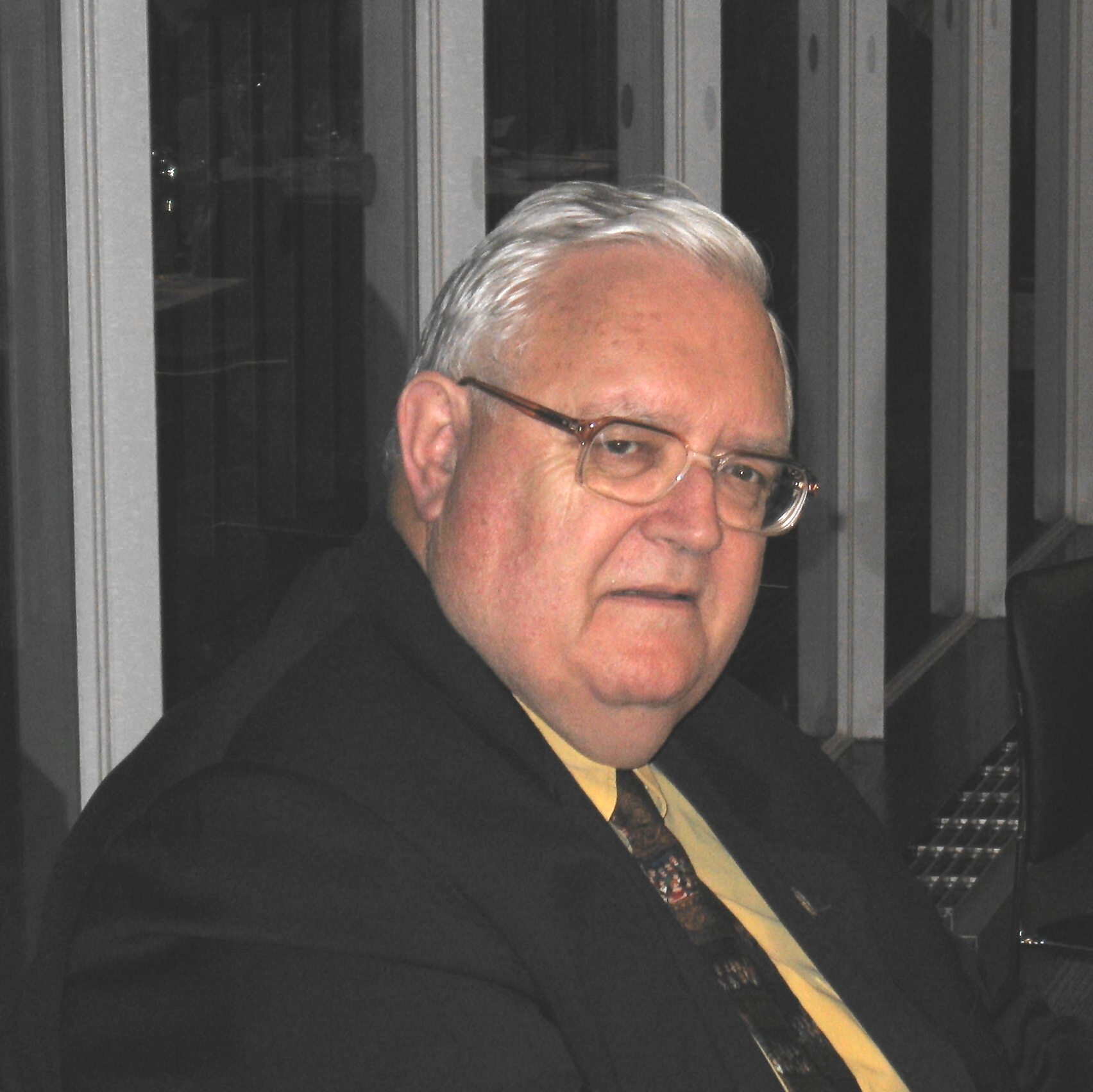
- Hunt in 2006

28th High Commissioner to the United Kingdom
- In office April 2005 – March 2008
- Prime Minister: Helen Clark
- Preceded by: Russell Marshall
- Succeeded by: Derek Leask

26th Speaker of the House of Representatives
- In office 20 December 1999 – 3 March 2005
- Prime Minister: Helen Clark
- Preceded by: Doug Kidd
- Succeeded by: Margaret Wilson

16th Minister of Housing
- In office 14 August 1989 – 2 November 1990
- Prime Minister: Geoffrey Palmer; Mike Moore
- Preceded by: Helen Clark
- Succeeded by: John Luxton

27th Minister of Tourism
- In office 10 January 1988 – 14 August 1989
- Prime Minister: David Lange; Geoffrey Palmer
- Preceded by: Helen Clark
- Succeeded by: Fran Wilde

3rd Leader of the House
- In office 24 August 1987 – 2 November 1990
- Prime Minister: David Lange; Geoffrey Palmer; Mike Moore
- Preceded by: Geoffrey Palmer
- Succeeded by: Paul East

50th Postmaster-General
- In office 26 July 1984 – 24 August 1987
- Prime Minister: David Lange
- Preceded by: Rob Talbot
- Succeeded by: Richard Prebble

Member of the New Zealand Parliament for New Lynn
- In office 26 November 1966 – 12 October 1996
- Preceded by: Rex Mason
- Succeeded by: Phil Goff

Member of the New Zealand Parliament for Labour party list
- In office 12 October 1996 – 31 March 2005
- Succeeded by: Lesley Soper (Note: Normally, list MPs do not have individual predecessors or successors, but Hunt resigned during a sitting parliament and therefore was succeeded by Soper.)

Personal details
- Born: Jonathan Lucas Hunt; 2 December 1938 Lower Hutt, New Zealand
- Died: 8 March 2024 (aged 85)
- Party: Labour
- Profession: High school teacher

Jonathan Lucas Hunt ONZ PC (2 December 1938 – 8 March 2024) was a New Zealand politician and diplomat. He started a 38-year parliamentary career as the Baby of the House and retired as Father of the House. During that tenure, he was Speaker of the House of Representatives. Afterwards, he served as New Zealand's High Commissioner to the United Kingdom from 2005 to March 2008. He was a member of the Order of New Zealand, New Zealand's highest civilian honour, and given the nickname "Minister for Wine and Cheese" for enjoying those items.

== Early life ==
Hunt was born in Lower Hutt, but grew up in Palmerston North. He had a twin brother, David, who died four days after they were born. Hunt's father was a child welfare officer, reassigned to the Manawatu in 1942. Hunt was educated at Palmerston North Boys' High School and later Auckland Grammar School; later he enrolled at the University of Auckland, where he gained a BA (Hons) degree in history.

In 1958, Hunt was elected editor of the Auckland University Students' Association's (AUSA) Craccum magazine for the 1959 year. While at University Hunt is also credited with founding the Princes Street Labour branch. He was a 'radio quiz kid' and in 1963 he toured South-East Asia with a Rotary group of Young New Zealanders.

After graduating, Hunt became a History, English and Latin teacher from 1961 to 1966 at Kelston Boys High School in West Auckland where he also coached cricket. He was then a university tutor. Hunt also had a long-standing relationship with the Department of Political Studies at the university, which for many years has collected and archived Hunt's personal and professional papers. Hunt lived in Karekare on Auckland's west coast and he was well known for his passionate interest in the sport of cricket. He was the secretary of the Auckland Secondary Schools' Cricket Association.

== Member of Parliament ==
New Zealand Parliament
Years	Term	Electorate	List	Party
1966–1969	35th	New Lynn		Labour
1969–1972	36th	New Lynn		Labour
1972–1975	37th	New Lynn		Labour
1975–1978	38th	New Lynn		Labour
1978–1981	39th	New Lynn		Labour
1981–1984	40th	New Lynn		Labour
1984–1987	41st	New Lynn		Labour
1987–1990	42nd	New Lynn		Labour
1990–1993	43rd	New Lynn		Labour
1993–1996	44th	New Lynn		Labour
1996–1999	45th	List	7	Labour
1999–2002	46th	List	6	Labour
2002–2005	47th	List	3	Labour

In 1966 at age 27, Hunt was offered to replace the retiring Rex Mason in Auckland's New Lynn electorate. This being a safe Labour electorate, Hunt was effectively given a seat in parliament, and he became the Baby of the House as the only MP still in their 20s. (Note: Brian MacDonell, born 1935, was the next-youngest MP at the time.) Hunt was to later write a biography of Mason for the Dictionary of New Zealand Biography. He remained MP for New Lynn until 1996, when he became a list MP after losing in Tamaki to National's Clem Simich. Hunt was returned twice more as a list MP; losing Waitakere to National's Brian Neeson in the 1999 election and as a list-only candidate in the 2002 election.

In mid-January 1970, United States Vice President Spiro Agnew visited Wellington. Hunt along with several other Labour Members of Parliament including Bob Tizard, Arthur Faulkner and Martyn Finlay boycotted the state dinner to protest American policy in Vietnam. Other Labour MPs, including Opposition Leader Norman Kirk attended the function which dealt with the Nixon Doctrine.

Hunt was appointed junior government whip upon Labour's victory in 1972 election. He was later promoted further in 1974 by Prime Minister Bill Rowling to the position of Chairman of Committees. As Chairman of Committees he had the responsibility of deputising for the Speaker of the House of Representatives, the 67 year old Stan Whitehead. Whitehead was in ill-health and Hunt acted on his behalf more than he had expected to. When Whitehead suffered a heart attack in the last parliamentary session of 1975 Hunt was nearly drafted to replace him as Speaker, though Whitehead was to make a recovery. Hunt was a contributor to major parliamentary reforms which saw Parliamentary Service and the Office of the Clerk of the New Zealand House of Representatives were separated.

After the shock defeat of the Rowling government in the 1975 general election, Hunt was appointed to Rowling's shadow cabinet and designated as Shadow Minister of Health in 1976. He left the shadow cabinet, at his own request, in 1979 with the intention of setting himself up to become Speaker of the House should Labour win the next election. Labour did not win and in the next parliamentary term he was senior whip and Shadow Minister of Broadcasting.

=== Cabinet Minister ===
During the Fourth Labour Government he served as Postmaster-General, Minister of Broadcasting, Minister of Tourism and Minister of Housing. He had chaired the caucus committee on restructuring the broadcasting industry in 1973 which was uncompleted. On becoming Minister of Broadcasting in 1984, he said the idea would not be resurrected but reaffirmed his intention to fulfil Labour's manifesto to establish a Maori and Pacific Island radio station, ban commercials on the concert and national radio programmes and aiding the establishment of privately owned television stations. Hunt worked on the Adult Adoption Information Act 1985, which enabled adults who were adopted as children to find out who their birth parents were as well as allowing birth mothers to learn about their adopted adult children. In the Tourism portfolio he was deeply involved with restructuring New Zealand's wine industry, which laid the foundation for New Zealand's global reputation for good quality wine. As Postmaster-General the New Zealand Post Office was heavily affected by the government's free-market reforms. The government closed 432 post offices with mass staff layoffs which caused community outrage. Hunt was loath to implement such reforms, seeing them as a contradiction to Labour Party ideology. His reluctance to make such decisions meant that Stan Rodger, the Minister of State Services, ended up deciding on them.

After the 1987 election, the cabinet was reshuffled in which he lost the broadcasting and Postmaster-General portfolios and instead designated Leader of the House. This left him without a department to administer which saw his salary reduced by $19,200 per annum, leading to opposition leader Jim Bolger to label Hunt's position as "sinecure", much to Hunt's displeasure. He eventually was given extra portfolios of tourism, housing and broadcasting during the course of the term. During his second period as Broadcasting minister he followed through with his pledge in aiding the establishment of privately owned television stations. He approved the licence for TV3, New Zealand's first commercial television channel, to begin operations in November 1989. He was responsible for the passing of the Broadcasting Act 1989 which established NZ On Air, an organisation responsible for funding support for local broadcasting and creative works.

During the divisions of the Fourth Labour Government's second term, Hunt generally supported Prime Minister David Lange over the finance minister Roger Douglas. Hunt was famed for his kindness and willingness to accommodate conflicting points of view. He was described by Douglas ally Richard Prebble as the "20 stone straw in the wind" in reference to both his weight and agreeableness. In 1989, Prime Minister Geoffrey Palmer nominated Hunt a member of the Privy Council in recognition of his long service to Parliament.

Upon the retirement of Sir Robert Muldoon, Hunt was the longest-serving member of Parliament between 1991 and 2005, earning him the unofficial title of 'Father of the House'. He assumed the title of 'father' to the delight of colleagues given his status as a lifelong bachelor.

In opposition again from 1990, Hunt was senior opposition whip, Shadow Leader of the House and Shadow Minister of Housing under leader Mike Moore. Hunt supported Helen Clark in her successful leadership bid against Moore, after which he remained senior whip and Shadow Leader of the House.

=== Speaker of the House of Representatives ===
Hunt was elected Speaker unopposed when the fifth Labour government came to power in 1999. Hunt had previously served as Chairman of Committees from 1974 to 1975 which had since been rebranded as the Deputy-Speaker. Hunt became the eighth Chairman of Committees to later serve as Speaker. He retained his position following the election in 2002 serving in total as Speaker for six years from 1999 to 2005. Clark believed Hunt as a good speaker who had an impeccable knowledge of standing orders and parliamentary procedures. He also had good strong working relationship with the Clerk of the House, David McGee, and together ran a "pretty tight ship."

== High Commissioner to the United Kingdom ==
In December 2004, it was announced that he would retire from politics and replace Russell Marshall as New Zealand High Commissioner in London, a move that had long been anticipated. He was replaced as Speaker by Margaret Wilson on 3 March 2005 and left Parliament on 30 March, the day that he gave his valedictory in parliament. In his valedictory speech he thanked many people and stated that he thought that his success in this Parliament was fighting for and finally getting the Adult Adoption Information Act passed in 1985.

While in London, he was also accredited as non-resident High Commissioner to Nigeria, and Ambassador to Ireland

As a list MP, his vacant parliamentary seat was filled by the next available candidate on the Labour Party list, Lesley Soper.

Some controversy arose in mid-2005, when not long after he arrived in London, Hunt was told publicly by the New Zealand Prime Minister Helen Clark that he could not apply for the U.K. pension as it was not appropriate given his position of New Zealand High Commissioner and the fact that he was already collecting a New Zealand parliamentary pension.

On 21 November 2007, the New Zealand Foreign Minister, Winston Peters, announced that the next High Commissioner to London would be Derek Leask from March 2008.

== Personal life ==
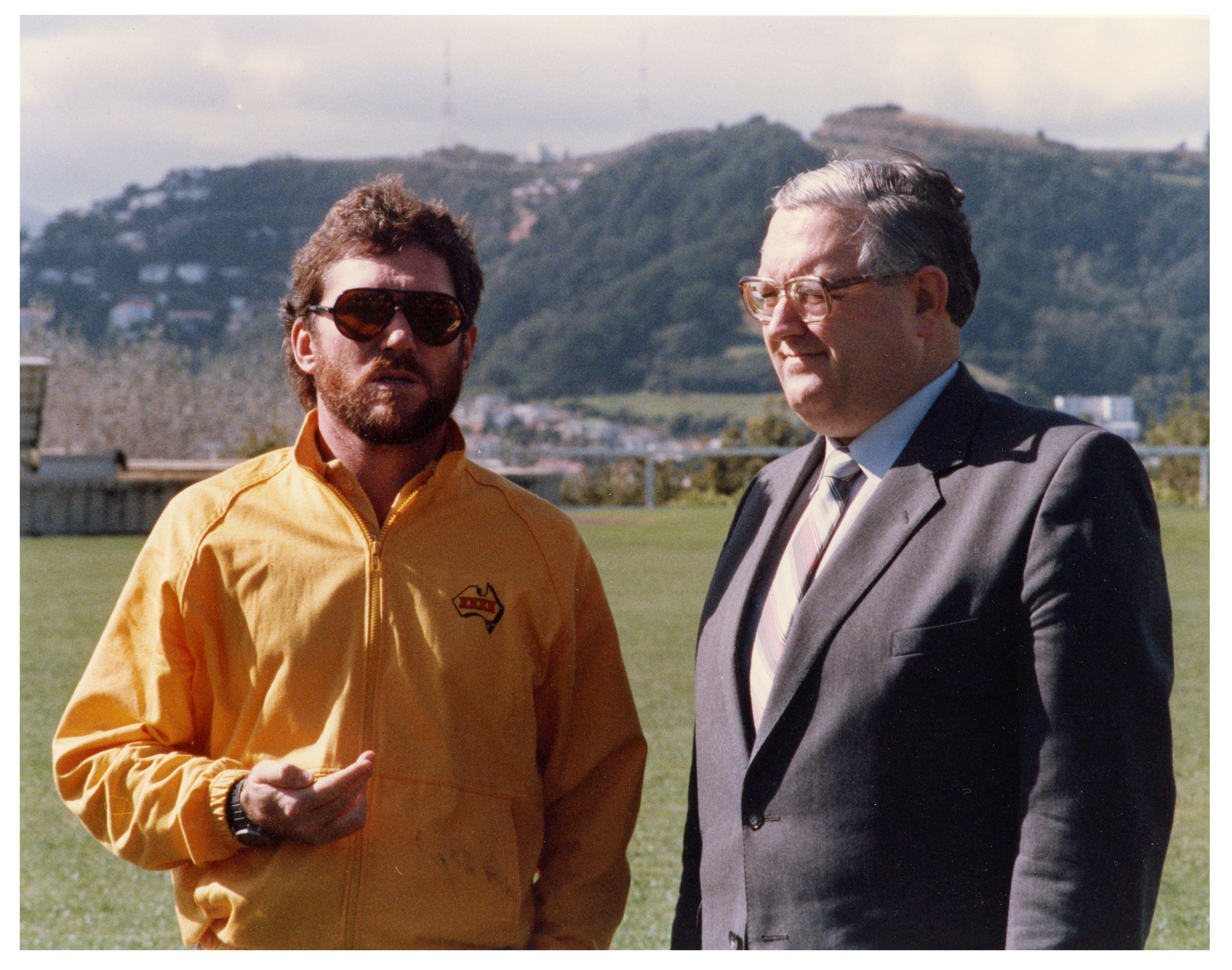
Hunt (right) and Australian cricket captain Allan Border in 1986.

Hunt never married or had any children. In a 2005 interview he stated not doing so was his biggest regret, thinking that splitting his life between Auckland and Wellington would be an unfair burden to be foisted upon family members. Hunt was the patron of the University of Auckland Debating Society. He was a lifelong enthusiast of the sport of cricket and was an administrator of the sport for many years. He was a fan of classical music.

Hunt died on 8 March 2024, at the age of 85.

== Honours ==
In 1977, Hunt was awarded the Queen Elizabeth II Silver Jubilee Medal and in 1990, the New Zealand 1990 Commemoration Medal. In the 2005 New Year Honours, Hunt was appointed a Member of the Order of New Zealand.

== Documentary ==
Hunt was also the subject of a documentary, Father of the House, directed by Simon Burgin and Xavier Forde, which was filmed in Wellington in 2005.

== Notes ==
New Zealand Parliament
Preceded by Rex Mason	Member of Parliament for New Lynn; 1966–1996	Succeeded by Phil Goff
Political offices
Preceded by Ron Bailey	Chairman of Committees of the House of Representatives; 1974–1975	Succeeded by Richard Harrison
Preceded by Helen Clark	Postmaster-General; 1984–1987	Succeeded by Richard Prebble
Preceded by Ian Shearer	Minister of Broadcasting; 1984–1987 1988–1990	Succeeded by Richard Prebble
Preceded by Richard Prebble	Minister of Broadcasting; 1984–1987 1988–1990	Succeeded by Maurice Williamson
Preceded by Geoffrey Palmer	Leader of the House; 1987–1990	Succeeded by Paul East
Preceded by Phil Goff	Minister of Tourism; 1988–1989	Succeeded by Fran Wilde
Preceded by Rob Talbot	Minister of Housing; 1989–1990	Succeeded by John Luxton
Preceded by Bill Birch	Shadow Leader of the House; 1990–1999	Succeeded by Roger Sowry
Preceded by Doug Kidd	Speaker of the New Zealand House of Representatives; 1999–2005	Succeeded by Margaret Wilson
Party political offices
Preceded by Russell Marshall	Senior Whip of the Labour Party; 1980–1984 1990–1996	Succeeded by Michael Cullen
Preceded by Trevor Mallard	Senior Whip of the Labour Party; 1980–1984 1990–1996	Succeeded by Mark Burton
Diplomatic posts
Preceded by Russell Marshall	High Commissioner to the United Kingdom; 2005–2008	Succeeded by Derek Leask
Honorary titles
Preceded by Robert Muldoon	Father of the House; 1991–2005	Succeeded by Helen Clark
