= Charles Chauvel (politician) =

New Zealand politician and lawyer

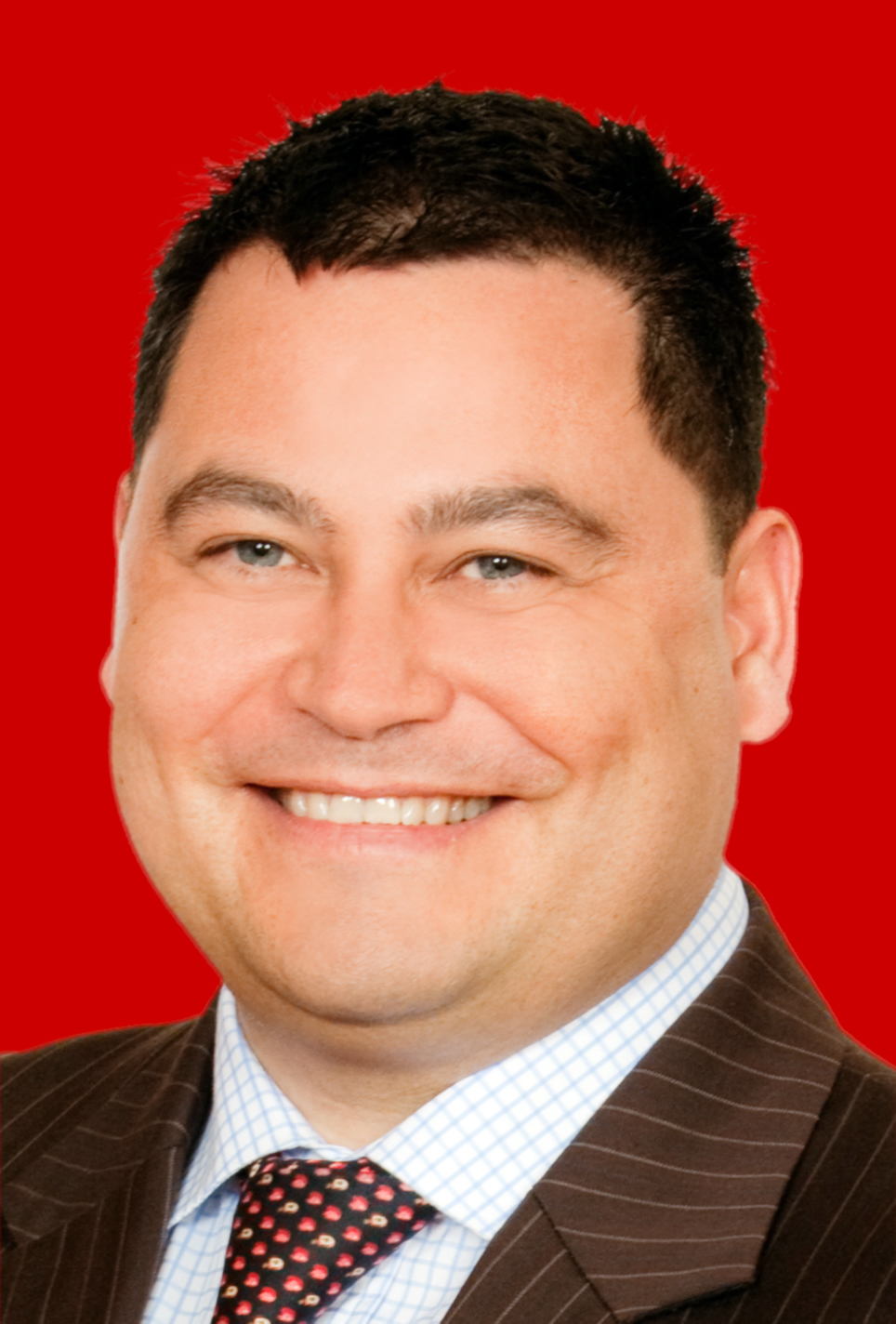

Member of the New Zealand Parliament for Labour Party List
- In office 1 August 2006 – 11 March 2013
- Preceded by: Jim Sutton (Note: Normally, list MPs do not have individual predecessors or successors, but Sutton resigned during a sitting parliament and therefore was succeeded by Chauvel, who later resigned himself and was succeeded by Beaumont.)
- Succeeded by: Carol Beaumont

Personal details
- Born: 16 April 1969 (age 57) Gisborne
- Party: Labour Party
- Profession: Member of Parliament, Lawyer

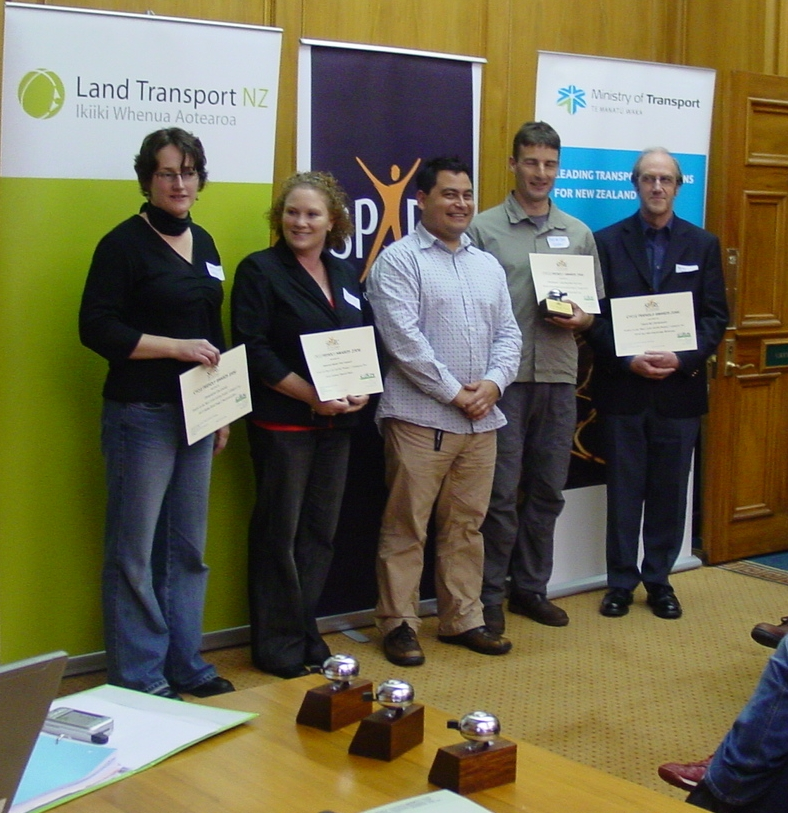
Charles Chauvel MP (centre)

Charles Pierre Chauvel (born 16 April 1969) is a New Zealand lawyer and former politician who was a Labour list Member of Parliament (2006–2013) until his resignation to take up a position with the UN Development Programme. He was the first New Zealand MP of Tahitian ancestry.

== Early years ==
Born and raised in Gisborne, he was awarded dux of Gisborne Boys' High School. While studying at the University of Auckland, Chauvel captained the University's winning University Challenge team in 1987. He was involved in student politics having been appointed as National Affairs Officer for the Auckland University Students' Association in 1987. Chauvel graduated with a Bachelor of Laws (with Honours) from Victoria University of Wellington in 1989, and a Master of Jurisprudence (with Distinction) in 1994 from the University of Auckland.

In addition, the International Training Centre of the ILO in Turin (Italy) awarded Chauvel the Diploma in International Labour Standards in 2001, and he also holds a Certificate in Health Economics (with Merit) from Victoria University of Wellington (awarded 1993) along with a Certificate in Public International Law from the Hague Academy of International Law (1997).

== Legal career ==
He was admitted as Barrister and Solicitor of the High Court of New Zealand in 1990, and to the New South Wales (Australia) Bar in 2003.

He wrote the re-issued Public Safety Title and served as consulting editor for a re-issue of the Gaming Law Title in the Laws of New Zealand Legal Encyclopedia. Chauvel has also co-authored two books, the New Zealand Employment Law Guide (LexisNexis, 2002) and Employment Mediation (Thomson Brookers, 2005). Prior to entering Parliament, Chavuel was on the board of Minter Ellison Rudd Watts (2003–2005) and became a partner in the Minter Ellison Legal Group in 2000. The 2005/06 edition of the Asia Pacific Legal 500 listed him as a "Leading Individual" in employment law.

== Other involvements ==
Chauvel was a board member of the New Zealand Aids Foundation from 1990 to 1994, serving as chair in 1996. He was appointed in 1995 to the Board of the New Zealand Public Health Commission; as Deputy Chair of the New Zealand Lotteries Commission, and as Deputy Chair of Meridian Energy in 2005, having served as a director of that company from 2002.

== Political career ==
New Zealand Parliament
Years	Term	Electorate	List	Party
2006–2008	48th	List	44	Labour
2008–2011	49th	List	27	Labour
2011–2013	50th	List	11	Labour

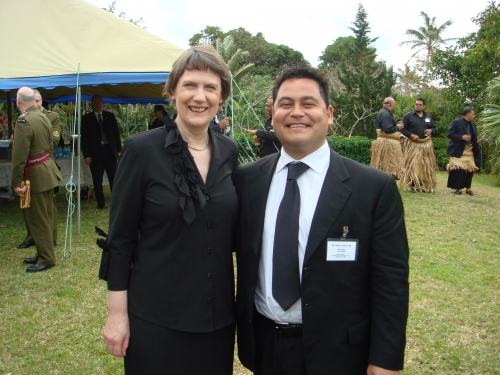
With former New Zealand Prime Minister Helen Clark

A member of the Labour Party since 1985, Chauvel has held a number of Labour Party positions including Chair of the Princes Street Branch, President of Young Labour (then known as Labour Socialist Youth), membership of the Party's controlling body (the New Zealand Council) and Policy council and co-Chair of Rainbow Labour.

Chauvel stood as Labour's electoral candidate for Maramarua, in 1990 losing to the National Party's Bill Birch. He next stood in 2005 as Labour's candidate for Ohariu-Belmont, then losing to United Future leader Peter Dunne. However, he was able to become a list MP on 1 August 2006 when Jim Sutton retired. He sought the Labour candidacy in Wellington Central ahead of the 2008 election but withdrew. Chauvel lost twice more to Dunne in the reconfigured Ōhariu electorate in 2008 and 2011, but was elected on both occasions as a list MP.

In his first term of Parliament—the last of the Fifth Labour Government—Chauvel was a member of the Commerce Committee and the Government Administration committee from August 2006 to February 2007, and thereafter chair of the Finance and Expenditure committee and a member of the Justice committee until October 2008. He was also parliamentary private secretary to the Attorney-General in 2008, although his appointment to the role was delayed from the Government's late-2007 reshuffle because Chauvel announced he would be accepting the position before it had been officially confirmed.

In Labour's opposition years, he held party spokesperson roles for energy, climate change and the environment from 2008 until 2011, and for justice and the arts from 2011 until 2013. He was shadow attorney-general and chair of the privileges committee from 2011 to 2013. He supported David Cunliffe over David Shearer in the Labour Party leadership election of 2011.

On 19 February 2013, Chauvel announced his resignation from parliament, effective 11 March, to take a job working at the United Nations Development Programme. He gave his valedictory statement on 27 February 2013. He was succeeded in parliament by the next candidate on the Labour party list, Carol Beaumont.

=== Repeal of the Provocation Defence ===
Provocation, as a defence to murder, was publicised in New Zealand due to the high-profile trials of Clayton Weatherston in 2008 and Ferdinand Ambach in 2009, both of whom attempted to plead provocation in court (the latter successfully). The Law Commission, in its 2007 report on the issue, had argued for repeal of the defence. Chauvel drafted a member's bill to repeal the provocation defence in 2009, although a separate Government bill was later introduced and passed in November 2009 by 116 votes to five; the ACT Party voicing the only opposition.

== International roles ==
In February 2009, he and the former leader of the New Zealand Labour Party, Helen Clark, were appointed as New Zealand's inaugural representatives on the Board of the Pacific Friends of the Global Fund, the regional partnership with the Bill and Melinda Gates Foundation's major initiative against HIV/AIDS, Tuberculosis and Malaria.

In June 2010, Chauvel was appointed as a member of the United Nations Global Commission on HIV and the Law.

After leaving Parliament, Chauvel worked for the United Nations Development Programme in New York and then as the United Nations Asia and Pacific regional ombudsman.
