= List of high commissioners of New Zealand to the United Kingdom =

The high commissioner of New Zealand to the United Kingdom is New Zealand's foremost diplomatic representative in the United Kingdom of Great Britain and Northern Ireland, and in charge of New Zealand's diplomatic mission in the United Kingdom.

== History ==
The High Commission of New Zealand is located in London, the United Kingdom's capital city. New Zealand has maintained a resident high commissioner in the United Kingdom since 1905, and a resident Agent-General since 1871. The high commissioner to the United Kingdom is concurrently accredited as high commissioner to Nigeria.

The high commissioner was formerly accredited as ambassador of New Zealand to Ireland, which is now a resident mission in Dublin since 2018.

As New Zealand was created as a part of the British Empire, its diplomatic relationship with the United Kingdom is its longest-standing; the position of high commissioner in London pre-dates New Zealand's Dominion status by two years, the Balfour Declaration of 1926 by 21 years, and the adoption of the Statute of Westminster of 1931 by 42 years. New Zealand appointed a high commissioner to Canada in 1942, and a high commissioner to Australia in 1943.

As fellow members of the Commonwealth of Nations, diplomatic relations between New Zealand and the United Kingdom are at governmental level, rather than between heads of state, with member countries exchanging high commissioners, rather than ambassadors.

== List of heads of mission ==
The following individuals have held the office:

No.	Name	Portrait	Term of office		Monarch
1	Isaac Featherston (Note: the first Agent-General for the Colony of New Zealand)		March 1871	September 1876	Victoria
2	Julius Vogel		September 1876	December 1880	Victoria
3	Dillon Bell		December 1880	September 1891	Victoria
4	Westby Perceval		September 1891	December 1895	Victoria
5	William Pember Reeves (Note: the last Agent-General and the first High Commissioner for the Dominion of New Zealand)		December 1895	December 1908	Victoria
5	William Pember Reeves		December 1895	December 1908	Edward VII
6	William Hall-Jones		December 1908	August 1912	Edward VII
6	William Hall-Jones		December 1908	August 1912	George V
7	Thomas Mackenzie		August 1912	19 June 1920	George V
8	James Allen		19 June 1920	1 July 1926	George V
9	James Parr		1 July 1926	9 January 1930	George V
10	Thomas Wilford		9 January 1930	25 January 1934	George V
(9)	James Parr		25 January 1934	3 September 1936	George V
(9)	James Parr		25 January 1934	3 September 1936	Edward VIII
11	Bill Jordan		3 September 1936	17 September 1951	Edward VIII
11	Bill Jordan		3 September 1936	17 September 1951	George VI
12	Frederick Doidge		17 September 1951	26 May 1954†	George VI
12	Frederick Doidge		17 September 1951	26 May 1954†	Elizabeth II
13	Clifton Webb		4 January 1955	31 March 1958	Elizabeth II
-	Dick Campbell (acting)		1 April 1958	30 September 1958	Elizabeth II
-	George Laking (acting)		30 September 1958	20 March 1961	Elizabeth II
14	Thomas Macdonald		20 March 1961	31 March 1968	Elizabeth II
-	Hunter Wade (acting)		31 March 1968	11 May 1968	Elizabeth II
15	Denis Blundell		11 May 1968	22 August 1972	Elizabeth II
-	Merv Norrish (acting)		22 August 1972	15 March 1973	Elizabeth II
16	Terry McCombs		15 March 1973	22 March 1975	Elizabeth II
17	Hugh Watt		22 March 1975	21 June 1976	Elizabeth II
18	Douglas Carter		21 June 1976	16 July 1979	Elizabeth II
19	Les Gandar		16 July 1979	27 September 1982	Elizabeth II
20	Bill Young		27 September 1982	21 February 1985	Elizabeth II
21	Joe Walding		21 February 1985	5 June 1985†	Elizabeth II
22	Bryce Harland		15 October 1985	3 June 1991	Elizabeth II
23	George Gair		3 June 1991	April 1994	Elizabeth II
24	John Collinge		April 1994	1 May 1997	Elizabeth II
25	Richard Grant		1 May 1997	4 January 1999	Elizabeth II
26	Paul East		4 January 1999	4 January 2002	Elizabeth II
27	Russell Marshall		4 January 2002	4 January 2005	Elizabeth II
28	Jonathan Hunt		April 2005	March 2008	Elizabeth II
29	Derek Leask		March 2008	February 2013	Elizabeth II
30	Lockwood Smith		25 March 2013	24 March 2017	Elizabeth II
31	Jerry Mateparae		24 March 2017	April 2020	Elizabeth II
32	Bede Corry		April 2020	8 September 2022	Elizabeth II
-	Shannon Austin (acting)		8 September 2022	January 2023	Elizabeth II
-	Shannon Austin (acting)		8 September 2022	January 2023	Charles III
33	Phil Goff		January 2023	6 March 2025	Charles III
-	Chris Seed (acting)		11 March 2025	5 September 2025	Charles III
34	Hamish Cooper		5 September 2025	present	Charles III

Table footnotes:

== See also ==
- List of high commissioners of the United Kingdom to New Zealand
