= New Zealand–Philippines relations =

- New Zealand: Philippines

Diplomatic mission
- Embassy of New Zealand, Manila: Embassy of the Philippines, Wellington

Envoy
- Ambassador Catherine McIntosh: Ambassador Kira Danganan-Azucena

New Zealand–Philippines relations are the bilateral relations between New Zealand and the Philippines. The Philippines has an embassy in Wellington and 2 other consulates, one in Auckland and in Christchurch and New Zealand has an embassy in Manila. Both countries are members of Asia-Pacific Economic Cooperation.

== Background ==
Both New Zealand and the Philippines are countries wherein people of European and Austronesian descent live together with each other. As is the case with the British living alongside the Austronesian Maori in New Zealand, and the Spanish with the Austronesian Malay-Filipinos in the Philippines. They also have common Native American influence: as Polynesians in the Pre-Columbian era brought back from the Americas: Sweet Potatoes and Native Americans who were settled in New Zealand during the Polynesian contact with people from the Americas. Likewise, with the case of the Philippines, the Spaniards carried over: Mexican, Colombian, Venezuelan, Chilean, Argentine, Costa Rican, and Peruvian soldiers and colonists to the Philippines during the era of the Viceroyalty of New Spain. Eventually, both New Zealand and the Philippines were Allied Nations to the United States during the Second World War.

== Military relations ==
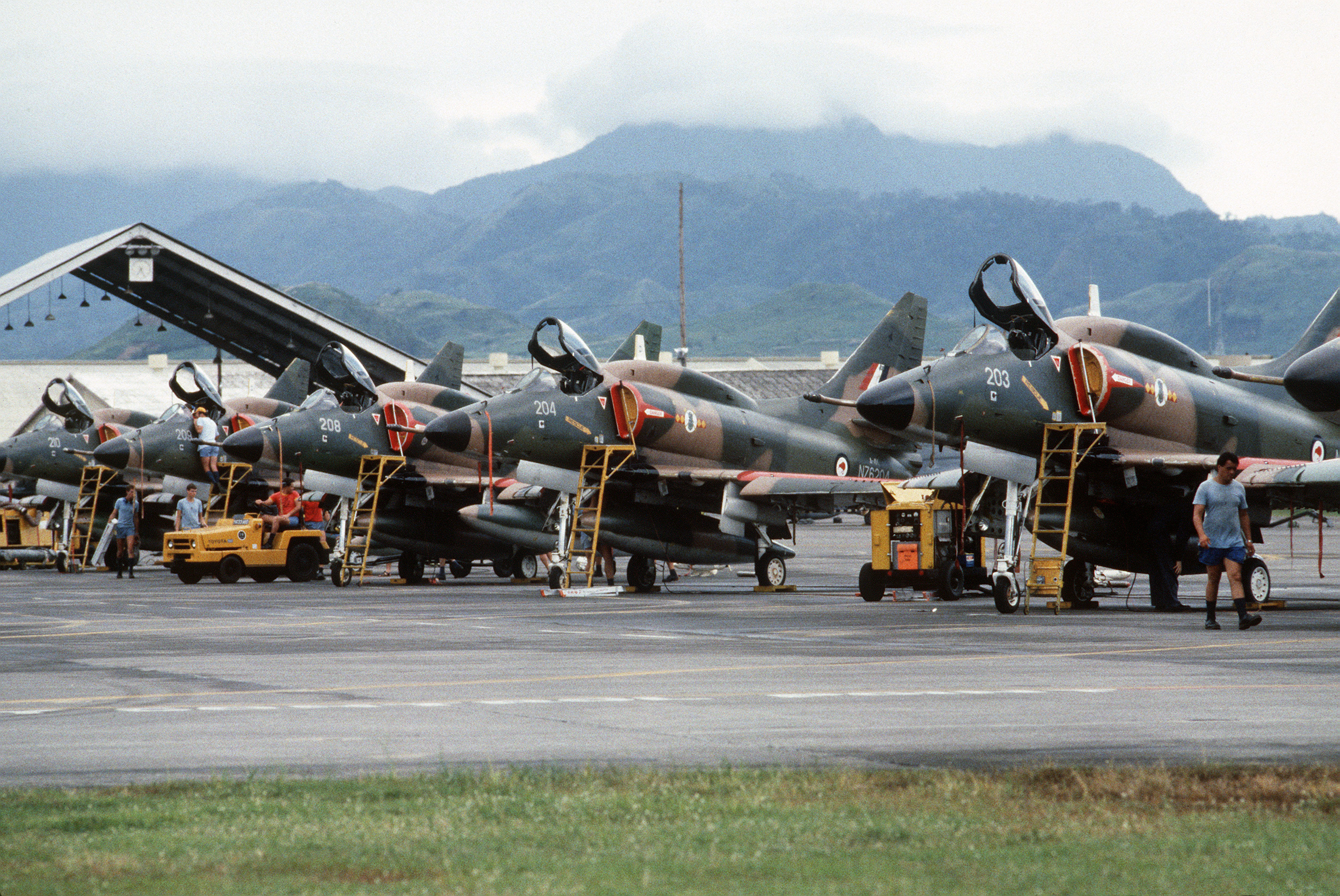
RNZAF A-4 Skyhawks of No. 75 Squadron in Clark Air Base, Luzon in The Philippines.

New Zealand and the Philippines fought together during the Korean War (1950–1953) under a UN-led police action to counter a North Korean invasion of South Korea.

During the course of the Cold War, New Zealand and the Philippines were both part of the Southeast Asia Treaty Organization from 1954 to 1977. The Royal New Zealand Air Force has also conducted exercises in the Philippines.

The commitment to the signing of a status of visiting forces agreement (SOVFA) began when Philippine President Bongbong Marcos and New Zealand Prime Minister Christopher Luxon met in April 2024. On April 30, 2025, both countries signed the SOVFA at the Malacañang Palace in Manila.

== Economic relations ==
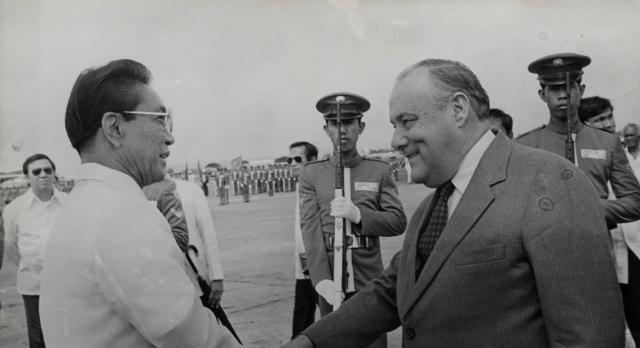
Then Philippine President Ferdinand Marcos greets New Zealand Prime Minister Robert Muldoon during the latter's state visit to the Philippines.

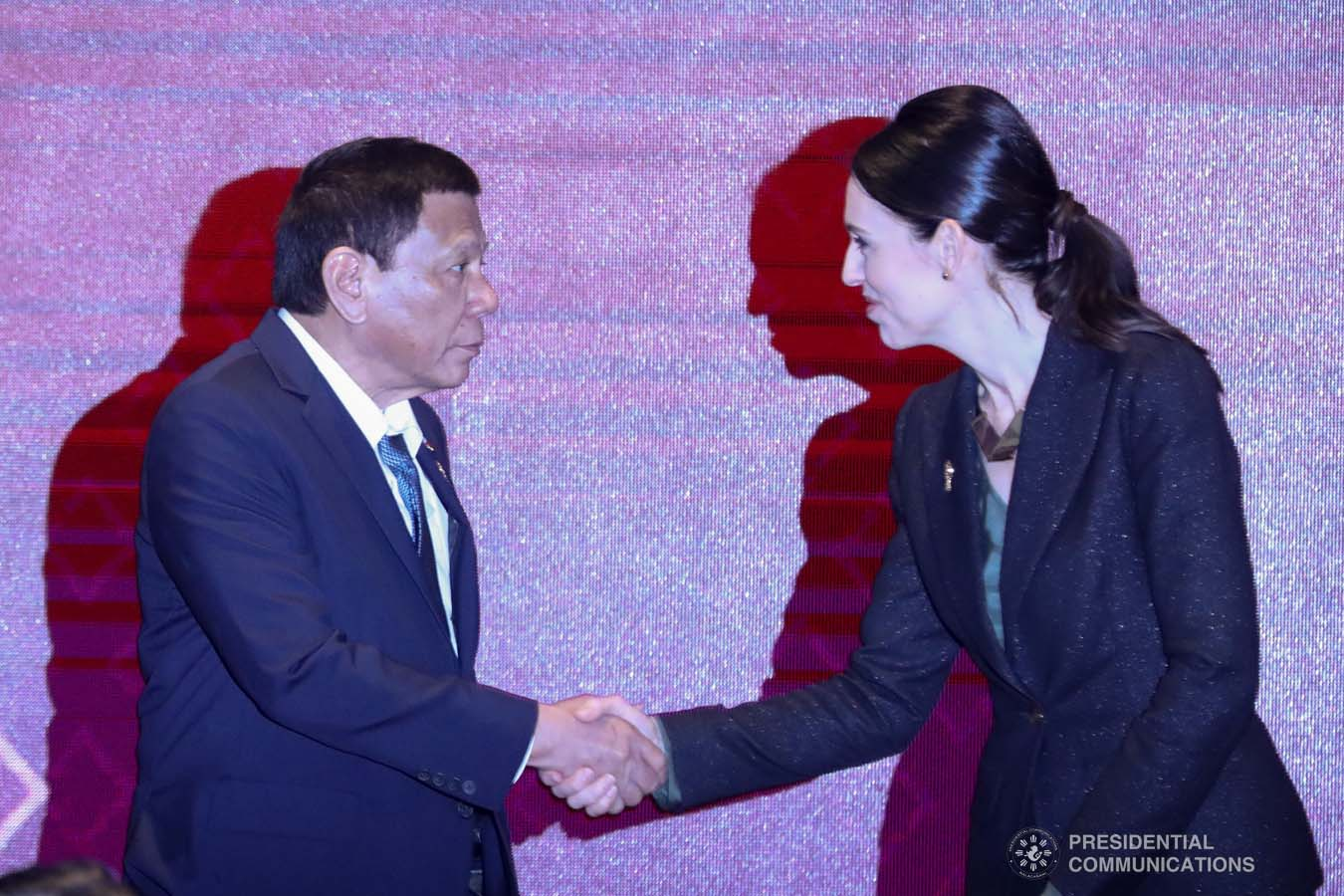
New Zealand Prime Minister Jacinda Ardern meets with Philippine President Rodrigo Duterte during the 14th East Asia Summit in Pasay, Philippines, in 2019

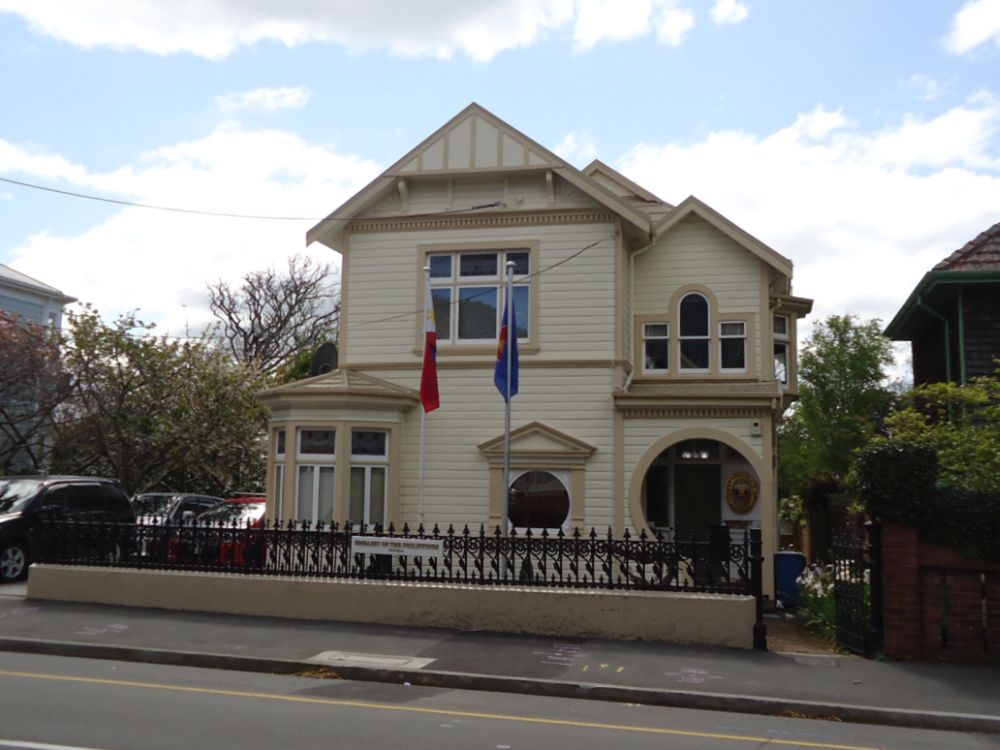
Embassy of the Philippines in Wellington

New Zealand's total exports to the Philippines in 2010 amounted to about US$475 million representing a 30% increase from 2009 making the Philippines one of their major export market.

Philippine Foreign Affairs Secretary Albert del Rosario made a two-day official visit to New Zealand upon the invitation of Foreign Minister Murray McCully. The Secretary noted the increasing business activities between the Philippines and New Zealand as more companies in both countries explore and engage in business and investment opportunities in the dairy, information technology, geothermal and other sectors.

== State visits ==
In October 2012, President Benigno Aquino III made a state visit to New Zealand. He witnessed the signing of three bilateral agreements meant to further strengthen diplomatic relations between Manila and Wellington. The signing followed a bilateral meeting between President Aquino and Prime Minister John Key, both held at the Parliament Building. The accords deal with a reciprocal working holiday scheme, defense cooperation and geothermal energy.

In April 2024, Prime Minister Christopher Luxon paid an official visit to the Philippines as part of a "very deliberate" foreign policy reset meant to shore up Southeast Asia's strategic and commercial importance to New Zealand. Luxon along with Filipino-New Zealander MP Paulo Garcia met with President Bongbong Marcos to discuss bilateral defence, trade, people-to-people, and climate cooperation. Luxon and Marcos agreed to upgrade the bilateral relationship to a "comprehensive partnership" by 2026. They also committed to finalizing a visiting forces agreement, which was eventually signed in April 2025.

In July 2026, New Zealand and the Philippines established their comprehensive partnership. It provided for deeper cooperation in political engagement; defence, security and maritime affairs; trade and economic relations; and people-to-people links.

== Police assistance ==
In 2009, the New Zealand Police was helping the Philippine National Police combat methamphetamine. The New Zealand Police also helps in providing training to the Philippine National Police.

== Migration ==
In 2013, there were over 40,000 Filipinos residing in New Zealand.

The 1936 New Zealand census found six New Zealand residents born in the Philippines, and the country's intake of Filipino students began to increase in 1960, under the Colombo Plan; however, even as late as 1981, there were only 405 Filipinos in New Zealand. It would take until the 1990s before highly populated regions such as Wellington and Auckland (especially the suburbs of Henderson and Mount Roskill) began to see exponential growth in their respective Filipino communities. The communities themselves are known for their many Philippine-related celebrations, particularly the celebration of Philippine Independence Day every year on the Sunday nearest to 12 June. In April 2008, New Zealand's embassy indicated that they would like to increase the intake of nurses and engineers from the Philippines.

== See also ==
- Filipino New Zealander
