= List of ambassadors of the Philippines to New Zealand =

Ambassador of the Republic of the Philippines to New Zealand
- Sugo ng Republika ng Pilipinas sa Nuweba Selandiya; He karere o te Repupiripia o te Piripīni ki Aotearoa
- Seal of the Department of Foreign Affairs of the Philippines

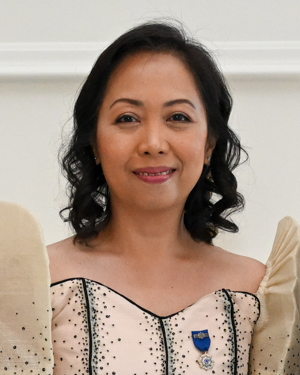
- Incumbent; Kira Christianne D. Azucena since June 13, 2023
- Department of Foreign Affairs; Embassy of the Philippines, Wellington
- Style: His/Her Excellency
- Reports to: Department of Foreign Affairs
- Seat: Wellington, New Zealand
- Nominator: Secretary of Foreign Affairs
- Appointer: President of the Philippines; with the advice and consent of the Commission on Appointments
- Term length: No fixed term
- Inaugural holder: Pacifico G. Evangelista
- Formation: October 9, 1976
- Website: Philippine Embassy, Wellington

The ambassador of the Republic of the Philippines to New Zealand (Filipino: Sugo ng Republika ng Pilipinas sa Nuweba Selandiya; Māori: He karere o te Repupiripia o te Piripīni ki Aotearoa) is the Republic of the Philippines' foremost diplomatic representative in New Zealand. As head of the Philippines' diplomatic mission there, the ambassador is the official representative of the president and the government of the Philippines to the governor-general and the government of New Zealand. The position has the rank and status of an ambassador extraordinary and plenipotentiary and is based at the embassy in Wellington, the country's capital.

The Philippine ambassador to New Zealand is also accredited as a non-resident ambassador to the countries of Cook Islands, Fiji, Niue, Samoa, and Tonga.

== Heads of mission ==
=== Ambassadors ===
Head of mission	Tenure	Note(s)
Pacifico G. Evangelista	1976–1986	Credentials were presented to Sir Denis Blundell on November 17, 1976. He served as Dean of the Diplomatic Corps in Wellington from May 1981 until March 31, 1986, when he retired from serving in the diplomatic service.
Eduardo J. Montilla	1986–1990	
Ernesto V. Llamas	1990–1993	
Vesta R. Cuyugan	1993–1996	
Alicia C. Ramos	1996–2002	
Francisco F. Santos	2002–2003	
Bienvenido V. Tejano	2005–2010	
Virginia H. Benavidez	2011–2015	Credentials were presented to Jerry Mateparae (Governor-General of New Zealand) on September 15, 2011; Tui Ātua Tupua Tamasese Efi (Head of State of Samoa) on November 13, 2012; Ratu Epeli Nailatikau (President of Fiji) on September 10, 2013; and Tupou VI (King of Tonga) on November 6, 2013.
Jesus S. Domingo	2016–2022	Credentials were presented to Jerry Mateparae (Governor-General of New Zealand) on April 20, 2016 and Tupou VI (King of Tonga) on June 19, 2017.
Kira Christianne D. Azucena	2023–	Appointment confirmed by the Commission on Appointments on February 23, 2023. Credentials were presented to Cindy Kiro (Governor-General of New Zealand) on June 13, 2023.
Source: Embassy of the Republic of the Philippines, Wellington

=== Chargés d’affaires ===
Head of mission	Tenure
Lolita B. Capco	October 2003 – July 2005
Giovanni E. Palec	October 2010 – August 2011
Querobine D. Laccay	June 2022 – June 2023
Source: Embassy of the Republic of the Philippines, Wellington

== See also ==
- List of ambassadors of New Zealand to the Philippines
- New Zealand–Philippines relations
