= Barbara Angus =

New Zealand diplomat and historian (1924–2005)

Barbara Angus CMG
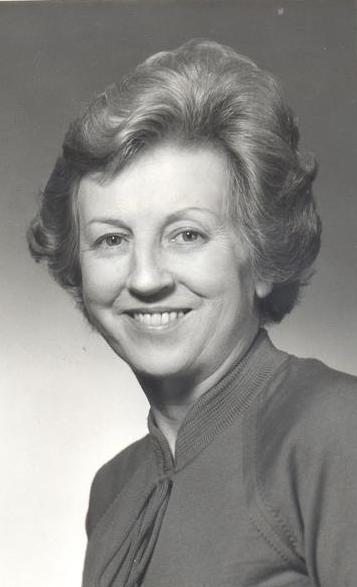
- Angus in 1971

New Zealand Ambassador to the Philippines
- In office 1978–1981
- Monarch: Elizabeth II
- Governors General: Keith Holyoake (1978–1980); David Beattie (1980–1981)
- Prime Minister: Robert Muldoon
- Preceded by: Mac Chapman
- Succeeded by: David Holboro

Personal details
- Born: 15 January 1924 Woodville, New Zealand
- Died: 4 February 2005 (aged 81) Waikanae, New Zealand
- Profession: Historian, writer

Barbara Angus CMG (15 January 1924 – 4 February 2005) was a New Zealand diplomat and historian who served as the country's ambassador to the Philippines between 1978 and 1981. She also worked for the Department of Internal Affairs as a research assistant in its War History Branch and later for the Department of External Affairs. Angus had stints as a diplomat in Singapore, Sydney, Kuala Lumpur and Washington, D.C., and authored a book on Katherine Mansfield and wrote two entries for the Dictionary of New Zealand Biography.

== Early life ==
Angus was born in Woodville, New Zealand, on 15 January 1924. She was the second of three children of the bank manager Archibald Douglas Angus and his wife Cora Florence Webber. She had one brother and one sister. Angus attended various primary schools across South Island because her father was posted to various places in New Zealand. She was later educated at South Otago High School, Balclutha, and graduated from University of Otago with a Master of Arts in history in 1945. One year later, Angus went to Auckland Teachers' Training College to do a postgraduate course.

== Career ==
She returned to Dunedin in 1947 and helped to author on the centennial history of Otago. Angus moved to Wellington in 1948 to become a research assistant for the War History Branch of the Department of Internal Affairs. Her career at the department saw her author a series of "civilian narratives" on New Zealand's social history on women's experience in particular during the Second World War. Angus left the position in 1950 to join the Department of External Affairs (now the Ministry of Foreign Affairs and Trade) as a research assistant. She and other women were barred from becoming diplomatic trainees in that period of history, and remained so until the 1970s. Between 1954 and 1957, Angus was the information officer at the New Zealand Embassy in Washington, D.C., and the era meant she had no diplomatic status. One of her functions was to produce a monthly news letter of domestic news to New Zealand citizens residing in Canada and the United States.

In 1958, Angus entered the diplomatic scene when she was appointed Third Secretary; during that period there were five female diplomats to 59 men. She was later promoted to Second Secretary in Singapore in 1962, then to Sydney from 1964 to 1968 and Kuala Lumpur between 1972 and 1975. Angus was the sole women diplomat to witness the founding of the Federation of Malaya in 1963. While in Sydney, she was dispatched to Outer Mongolia as New Zealand's representative at the United Nations Conference on the Participation of Women in Public Life in 1965. Angus later served as minister in Washington, D.C., from 1976 to 1978. One exchange during her career came from Henry Kissinger at a diplomatic dinner who asked, "What does Mr Angus do?".

Angus was appointed the ambassador of New Zealand to the Philippines in 1978. This made her the first New Zealand woman ambassador in a bilateral post and the third female head of mission overseas. While Angus was based in Manila, the relationship between the Philippines and New Zealand was under development, and her time in the position helped to pioneer both for the foreign service of New Zealand and the foreign policy of the Philippines. After she returned to Wellington in 1981, Angus was appointed the head of the Protocol Division at the Ministry of Foreign Affairs. Her role entailed ensuring the laws of New Zealand were complied with before becoming the first woman Chief of Protocol.

In 1984, Angus was required to retire from the department because she was 60 years old. She remained close to the Ministry of External Relations and Trade and from 1988 to 1991 chaired its grievance committee. In 1985, Angus authored A Guide to Katherine Mansfield's Wellington and Dictionary of New Zealand Biography entries on Katherine Mansfield's school friend Maata Mahupuku and Angus's diplomatic predecessor Jean McKenzie. In 1986, she was on the board of the Public Service Appeal Board, was a member of the Wellington branch committee of the New Zealand Historic Places Trust between 1984 and 1986 and of the restored Katherine Mansfield Birthplace Society in 1988.

== Later life and death ==
Angus was appointed a Companion of the Order of St Michael and St George in the 1988 Queen's Birthday Honours, for diplomatic and community services. In 1993, she was awarded the New Zealand Suffrage Centennial Medal. In her final years, Angus was afflicted by dementia, and she died in Waikanae on 4 February 2005. She was unmarried.

== Personality and legacy ==
The Ministry of Foreign Affairs and Trade said Angus's career had seen her break "the ‘glass ceiling’ limiting woman officers’ progress more than once"; she noted later in life that she was not the first woman in many diplomatic positions and did not call herself "a pioneer": "I’m not one of the people who lead movements. I think I’m one who benefits more by the struggles of other women" Both the Auckland War Memorial Museum and the National Library of New Zealand hold collections of papers related to Angus. They include her personal papers and objects connected to her life.
