= Jack Wright (diplomat) =

New Zealand colonial administrator, diplomat (1909–1990)

Jack Wright CBE
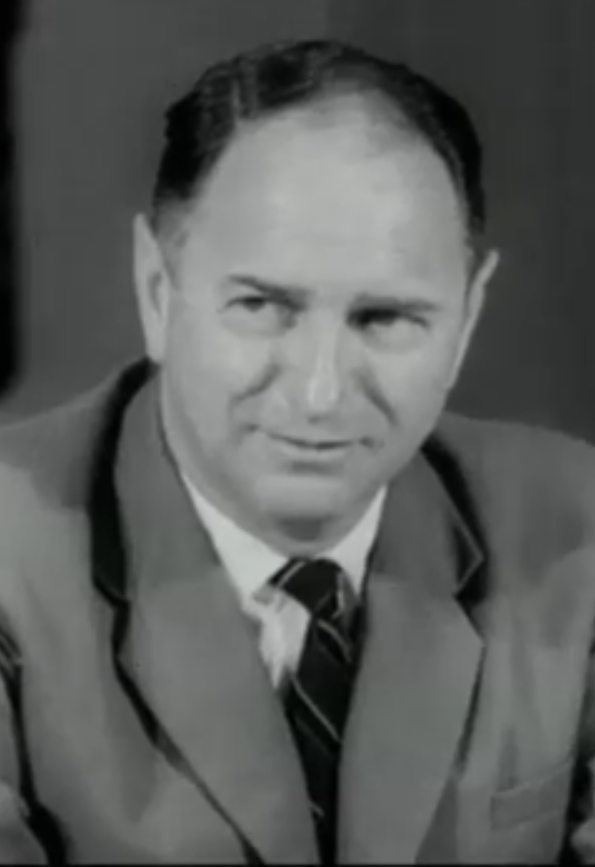

High Commissioner of New Zealand to Western Samoa
- In office 1962–1964
- Preceded by: Office created
- Succeeded by: Owston Paul Gabites

Administrator of Western Samoa
- In office 1960–1961
- Preceded by: Guy Powles
- Succeeded by: Office disestablished

Administrator of Tokelau
- In office 1960–1965
- Preceded by: Guy Powles
- Succeeded by: Owston Paul Gabites

Personal details
- Born: John Bird Wright; 26 March 1909 New Zealand
- Died: 30 September 1990 (aged 81)
- Resting place: Whangārei, New Zealand
- Occupation: Public servant

John Bird Wright (26 March 1909 – 30 September 1990), more known as Jack Wright, was a New Zealand colonial administrator who served as the last Administrator of Western Samoa, between 2 April 1960 and 31 December 1961, and the 7th Administrator of Tokelau between February 1960 and 31 March 1965.

== Biography ==
Jack Wright was born 26 March 1909 in New Zealand, and died on 30 September 1990 and was buried in Whangarei, New Zealand.

He served as the last Administrator of Western Samoa, from 2 April 1960 until its independence from the British Empire. Wright also served as the 7th Administrator of Tokelau between 1960 and 1965 and as the high commissioner of New Zealand to Samoa from 1962 to 1964.

On 1 January 1962, he received the Commander of the Order of the British Empire (CBE) medal.
