= Louie Bretaña =

Filipino painter and sculptor in New Zealand

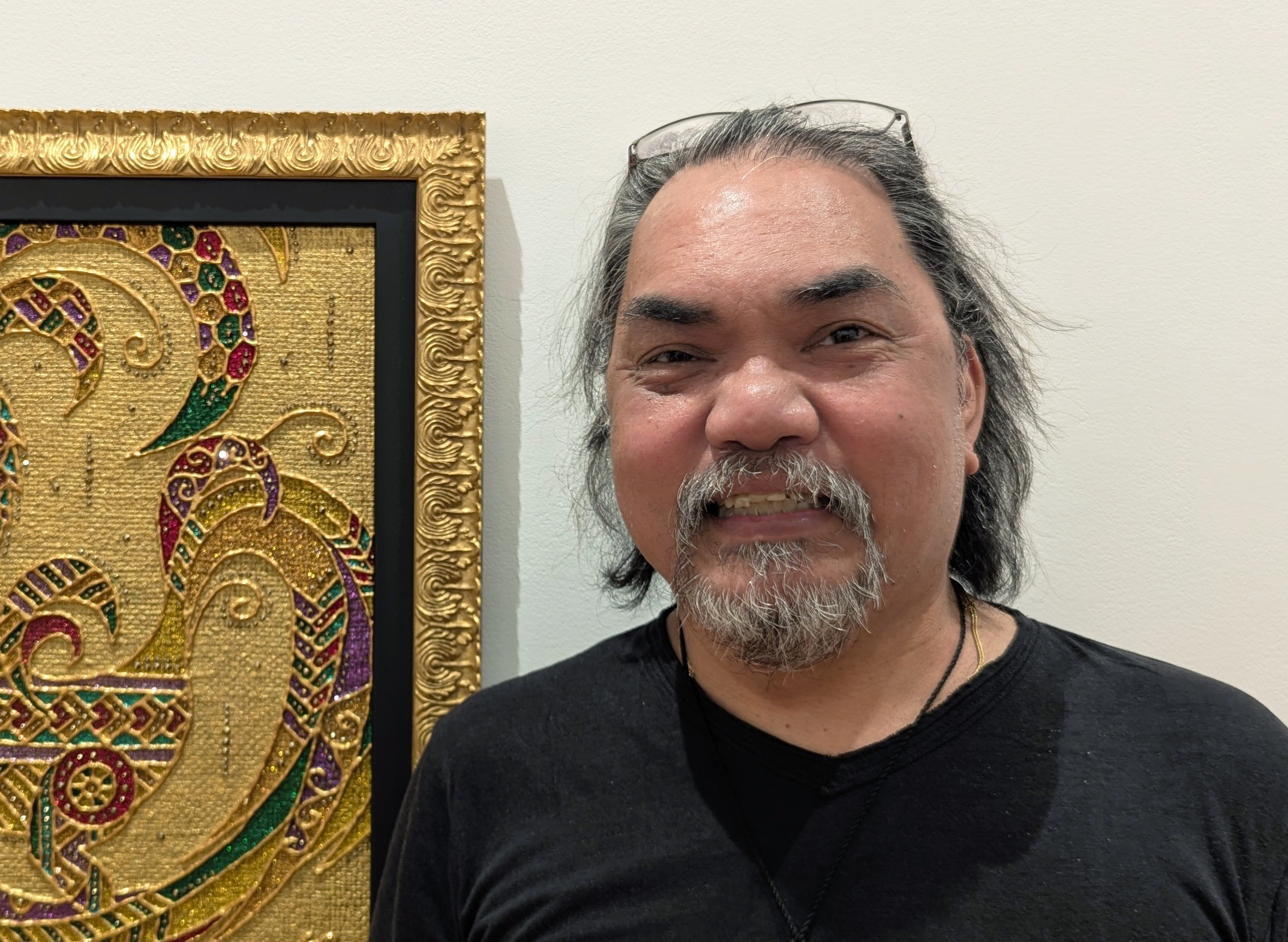
- Bretaña in 2025
- Born: Louis Joseph Rivera Bretaña; 1967 (age 58–59); Philippines
- Education: University of Auckland and University of Philippines Diliman
- Known for: painting, sculpture, performance
- Notable work: Eat My Rice
- Style: painting with glitter and glass crystals, figurative sculptures, and performance art

Louis Joseph Rivera Bretaña (born 1967) is a Filipino-born New Zealand painter and sculptor with roots in Manila and the Visayan province of Iloilo.

Bretaña graduated with Bachelor of Fine Arts degree from the University of the Philippines Diliman College of Fine Arts, and moved to New Zealand in 2011. He subsequently earned a Bachelor of Fine Arts with first-class honours (2018) and a Master of Fine Arts degree (2019) from the Elam School of Fine Arts at the University of Auckland.

Bretaña's work actively challenges Euro-western colonial histories and encouraging a respectful engagement with culture via conversation and interaction.

Bretaña's notable performance piece Eat My Rice was held in multiple locations throughout New Zealand, including Viaducts Events Centre as part of Aotearoa Art Fair, New Lynn Community Centre, Projectspace Gallery, RM Gallery, and Play_Station. Eat My Rice is a reimagining of the Filipino pre-colonial feast, where participants eat the rice with bare hands, food served on banana leaves, and letting go of standards and expectations of Euro-western society. In 2025, Bretaña performed Eat My Rice in Viaducts Events Centre as part of Aotearoa Art Fair, biggest art fair in New Zealand.

Pre-Christianity Filipino deities play a major role in Bretaña's paintings and sculptures; they act as a platform for pre-colonial Filipino narratives and mythologies, using glitter and glass crystals, but are merged with the local New Zealand context. In a Radio New Zealand interview, he stated "My works look into stories, myths and legends that I heard in my youth and I then translate them into paintings."

In 2024, Bretaña was awarded Artist of the Year, Filipino-Kiwi Hero Awards 2024 for his contribution to the New Zealand's visual arts.

In 2025, University of Auckland's School of Environment has Bretaña's works on permanent display, along with Fiona Pardington and John Reynolds.

== Selected solo and collaborative exhibitions ==
- 2025: Someone to Watch Over Me, Studio One Toi Tū, Auckland New Zealand
- 2025: Eat My Rice, Aotearoa Art Fair, Viaduct Events Centre, Auckland, New Zealand
- 2025: Eat My Rice, Studio One Toi Tū, Auckland, New Zealand
- 2024: Someone to Watch Over Me, Bergman Gallery, Auckland New Zealand
- 2023: Eat My Rice, part of World of Cultures, New Lynn Community Centre, Auckland New Zealand
- 2021: Tumingala sa tinitingala na mga tala, Te Uru Waitākere Contemporary Gallery, Auckland, New Zealand
- 2021: Dito sa Lupa Para nang sa Langit- On Earth as it is in the Heavens, Franklin Arts Centre, Auckland, New Zealand
- 2021: Syokes: Marc Conaco and Louie Bretaña, Objectspace, Auckland, New Zealand
- 2020: Blessed Art Thou, Studio One Toi Tū, Auckland, New Zealand
- 2017: Eat My Rice, RM Gallery, Auckland, New Zealand
- 2017: Eat My Rice, Performance Art Week Aotearoa, Play_Station, Wellington, New Zealand
- 2017: Eat My Rice, Projectspace Gallery, Auckland, New Zealand
- 2017: Eat My Rice, part of Performance Art Week Aotearoa, Play_Station, Auckland, New Zealand

== Selected group exhibitions ==
- 2025: Aotearoa Art Fair, Bergman Gallery, Viaduct Events Centre, Auckland, New Zealand
- 2024: Belonging: Stories of Contemporary New Zealand Asian Artists, Bergman Gallery, Auckland, New Zealand
- 2024: Aotearoa Art Fair, Bergman Gallery, Viaduct Events Centre, Auckland, New Zealand
- 2023: Five Painters, Bergman Gallery, Auckland, New Zealand
- 2023: A Place to Call Home - Contemporary New Zealand Asian Art, Bergman Gallery, Auckland, New Zealand
- 2023: Oasis/Respite 2.0, part of Auckland Pride Festival, Corbins Estate Art Centre & Studio One Toi Tū, Auckland, New Zealand
- 2023: Pride and Prejudice... Part 1, Bergman Gallery, Auckland, New Zealand
- 2021: Vaka to A Billion Stars, Matariki Festival 2021, Silo 6, Silo Park, Auckland, New Zealand
- 2019: Showcase, Fresh Gallery Ōtara, Auckland, New Zealand
