= Filipino New Zealanders =

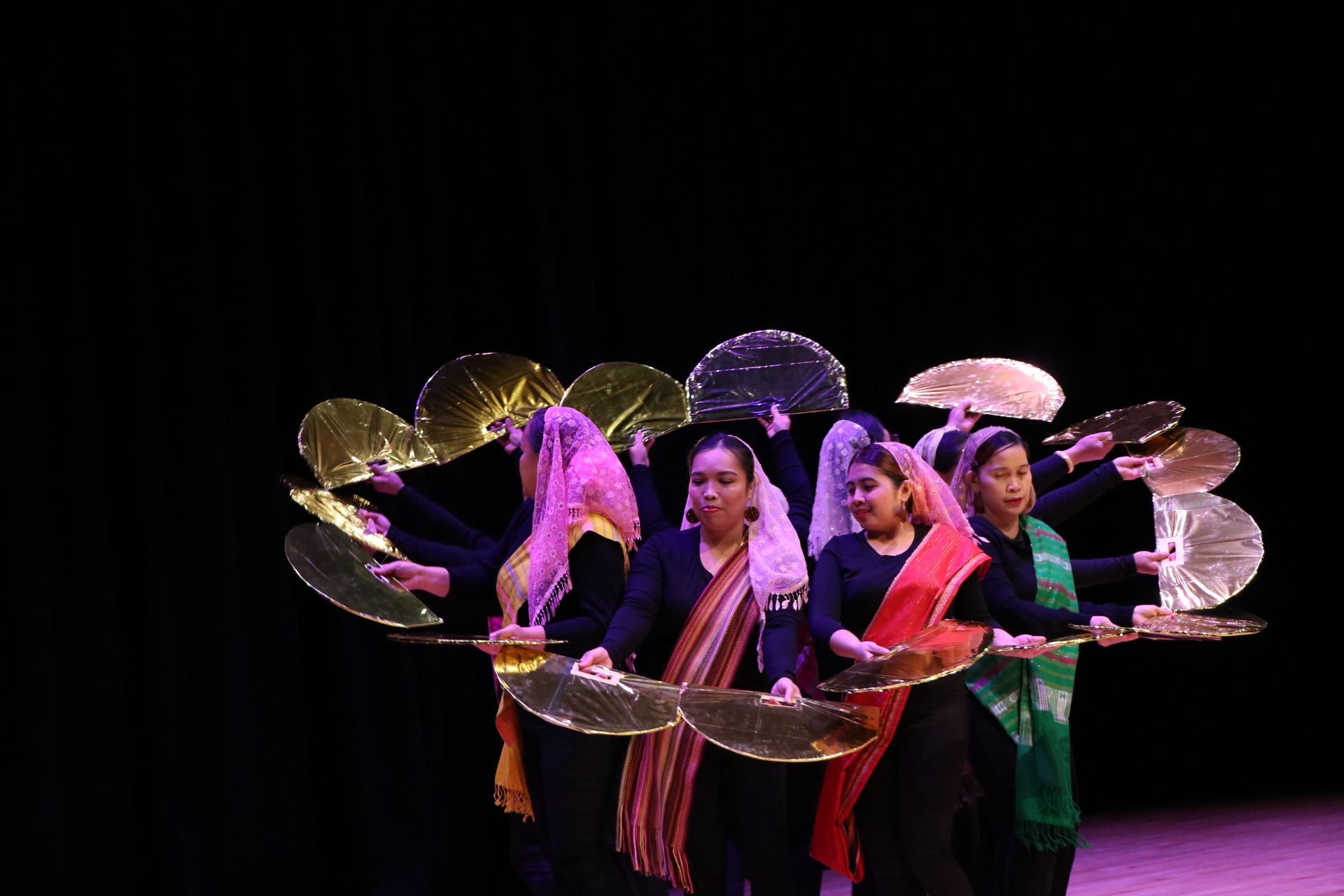
- Muslim Fan Dance by Clutha Filipino Society on July 2024

Total population
- 108,297 (2023)

Regions with significant populations
- Auckland, Christchurch, Wellington, Hamilton, Tauranga

Languages
- New Zealand English, Tagalog, Visayan languages, and/or other Philippine languages

Religion
- Majority Roman Catholics; Protestants · other Christians · Buddhists

Related ethnic groups
- Filipinos, Overseas Filipinos

Filipino New Zealanders refers to New Zealanders who migrated from the Philippines or descendants born in New Zealand of Filipino ancestry.

The 1936 New Zealand census recorded six New Zealand residents born in the Philippines. The country's intake of Filipino students began to increase in 1960, under the Colombo Plan; however, even as late as 1981, there were only 405 Filipinos in New Zealand. It was not until the 1990s that highly populated regions such as Wellington and Auckland (especially the suburbs of Henderson and Mount Roskill) began to see exponential growth in their respective Filipino communities. The communities themselves are known for their many Philippine-related celebrations, particularly the celebration of Philippine Independence Day every year on the Sunday nearest to 12 June. In April 2008, New Zealand's embassy indicated that they would like to increase the intake of nurses and engineers from the Philippines. In 2013 the Census recorded 40,350 people, or 1.0 percent of the population, Filipino New Zealanders.

== Demographics ==
There were 72,612 people identifying as being part of the Filipino ethnic group at the 2018 New Zealand census, making up 1.5% of New Zealand's population. This is an increase of 32,262 people (80.0%) since the 2013 census, and an increase of 55,674 people (328.7%) since the 2006 census. Some of the increase between the 2013 and 2018 census was due to Statistics New Zealand adding ethnicity data from other sources (previous censuses, administrative data, and imputation) to the 2018 census data to reduce the number of non-responses.

There were 34,770 males and 37,845 females, giving a sex ratio of 0.919 males per female. The median age was 32.5 years, compared with 37.4 years for New Zealand as a whole; 14,838 people (20.4%) were aged under 15 years, 16,914 (23.3%) were 15 to 29, 39,123 (53.9%) were 30 to 64, and 1,740 (2.4%) were 65 or older.

In terms of population distribution, 45.2% of Filipino New Zealanders lived in the Auckland region, 28.9% lived in the North Island outside the Auckland region, and 25.9% lived in the South Island. The Kaipātiki local board area of Auckland had the highest concentration of Filipino people at 5.4%, followed by the Maungakiekie-Tāmaki local board area (3.9%) and the Ashburton District (3.8%). The Chatham Islands and Great Barrier Island had the lowest concentrations, recording no Filipino people in their respective areas.

== Notable Filipino New Zealanders ==
- Louie Bretaňa, artist
- David Correos, comedian
- Paulo Garcia, Member of Parliament 2019–2020 and 2023–Present
- Francisco Hernandez, Member of Parliament 2024–Present
- Monina Hernandez, Nursing Council of New Zealand Board Member & Member of Parliament Candidate in the 2020 Elections
- James Roque, stand-up comedian
- Aileen Dela Rosa, beauty queen, commercial model, TV & Film talent
- Franki Russell, actress, model, and beauty queen
- Ken Tuffin, basketball player
- Victoria Velasquez Vincent, beauty queen and model

== See also ==
- New Zealand–Philippines relations
- Filipino diaspora
- Immigration to New Zealand
- Filipino Australians
