= Owston Paul Gabites =

New Zealand diplomat (1913–1993)

Paul Gabites

High commissioner of New Zealand to Samoa
- In office 1964–1968
- Preceded by: Jack Wright
- Succeeded by: Richard Taylor

Administrator of Tokelau
- In office 1965–1968
- Preceded by: Jack Wright
- Succeeded by: Richard Taylor

Ambassador of New Zealand to France
- In office 1969–1975
- Preceded by: Dick Hutchens
- Succeeded by: John G. McArthur

Personal details
- Born: Owston Paul Gabites; 5 December 1913 Timaru, New Zealand
- Died: 15 July 1993 (aged 79) Kent, United Kingdom
- Relations: Anna Dora Lunghetti (wife)
- Children: 3
- Occupation: Public servant

Owston Paul Gabites (5 December 1913 – 15 July 1993) was a New Zealand diplomat who served as the 8th Administrator of Tokelau from June 1965 to 1968, and ambassador of New Zealand to France between 1969 and 1975.

== Biography ==
Paul Gabites was born 5 December 1913 in Timaru, New Zealand.

After completing his education at the University of Canterbury, Gabites served in World War II from 1941 to 1945. He remained in Europe until 1946, during which time he met and married Italian Anna Dora Lunghetti. They had 3 children.

He died on 15 July 1993 in Kent, United Kingdom.

== Career ==
Paul Gabites was a teacher at St Peter's Cambridge from 1937 to 1941. As a politician, after serving in the Second World War, Gabites served in the Internal Affairs Department (1946–47), the Department of External Affairs (1947), as Head of Information Division in Wellington (1951–53), as Official Secretary in Ottawa (1953–56), as Councillor in Paris (195659), as Charge d'Affaires in Paris (1959–60), as Consul General in New York (1960–65), as member of New Zealand United Nations' Delegates (1960-64), as High Commissioner of Western Samoa (1965-68), as Administrator of the Tokelau Islands (1965–68), as Assistant Secretary in Wellington (1968–69), as Senior Commissioner of the South Pacific Commission (1968–69), as New Zealand's ambassador to France (1969–75), as a Permanent Representative to the OECD (1970–75) and as New Zealand's ambassador to the Holy See from 1973 until 1975, when he retired.
