= 1990 New Zealand Royal Visit Honours =

Awards list for New Zealand

1990 Royal Visit Honours
- Previous: 1990 Special Honours; Next: 1990 Special Honours
- Type: New Zealand royal honours: Royal Victorian Order; Queen's Service Order
- Date: 14–16 February 1990
- Country: New Zealand
- Total recipients: 7

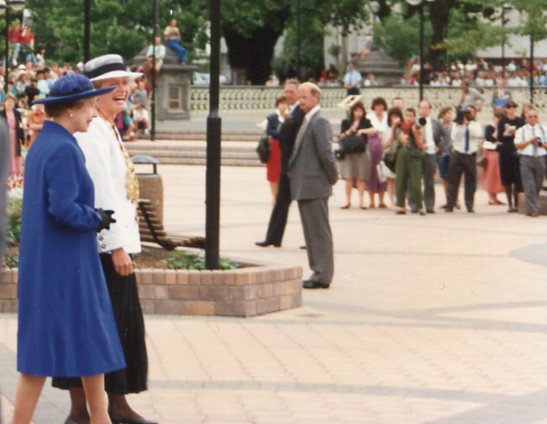
The Queen and the mayor of Christchurch, Vicki Buck, during a walkabout in Victoria Square, Christchurch, in February 1990

The 1990 New Zealand Royal Visit Honours were appointments by Elizabeth II to the Royal Victorian Order and Queen's Service Order, to mark her visit to New Zealand in February that year. During the tour, she officially closed the Commonwealth Games in Auckland, and attended celebrations marking the 150th anniversary of the Treaty of Waitangi. The honours were announced on 14 and 16 February 1990.

The recipients of honours are listed here as they were styled before their new honour.

== Royal Victorian Order ==
=== Lieutenant (LVO) ===
- Group Captain Norman Eric Richardson – Royal New Zealand Air Force (retired)
- Detective Superintendent Colin Walter Wilson – New Zealand Police

=== Member (MVO) ===
- Bernard Joseph Frahm
- Michael John Fokker
- Squadron Leader Brian Edward Joblin – Royal New Zealand Air Force
- Major George Sean Trengrove – Royal New Zealand Armoured Corps

== Companion of the Queen's Service Order (QSO) ==
=== For public services ===
- Paul Charles Cotton CVO – New Zealand Secretary to The Queen
