= Rotokawau Virginia Lake =

Lake reserve in Whanganui, New Zealand

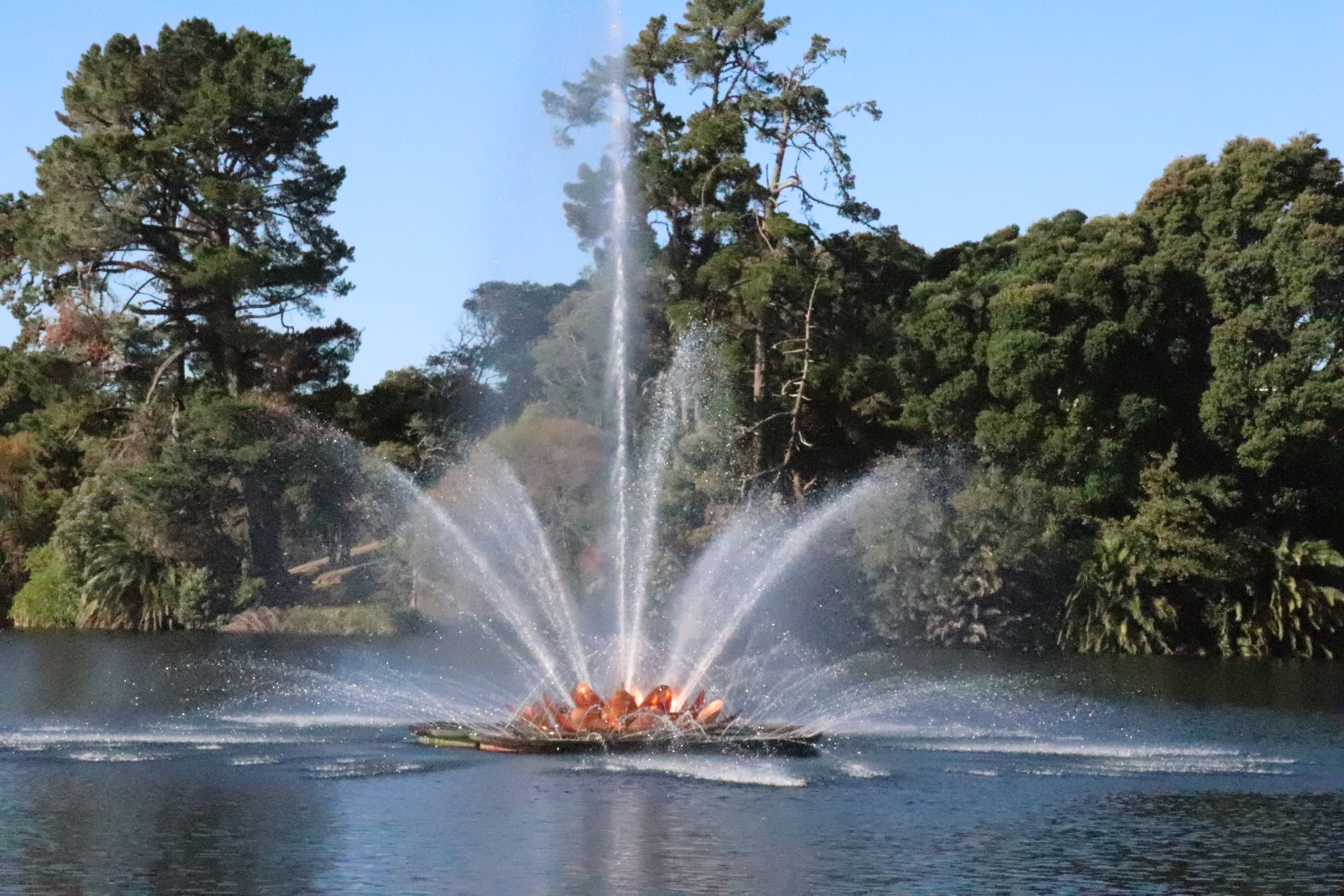
- Higginbottom Fountain at Virginia Lake

- Location within North Island
- Location: North Island
- Coordinates: 39.9141°S 175.0291°E
- Basin countries: New Zealand
- Settlements: Whanganui

Rotokawau Virginia Lake is a lake in the city of Whanganui in the North Island of New Zealand. It is situated in the suburb of St Johns Hill in the north of the city.

The lake was called Virginia Lake for many years but in 2016 the Whanganui District Council voted to rename it Rotokawau Virginia Lake. The Māori name Rotokawau refers to the kawau, a native shag.

The lake came in to public ownership in June 1874 when it was purchased by the then Wanganui Borough Council to provide the first reticulated drinking water supply for the town. The quality of the water was found to be poor and its use discontinued shortly thereafter. A viewing platform and gazebo extending over the southeastern extent of the lake is built on top of a pumphouse constructed in 1903. A 6-inch pump powered by two motors was installed to provide a backup water supply to the town in case of a failure in the gravity-fed main supply from Westmere.

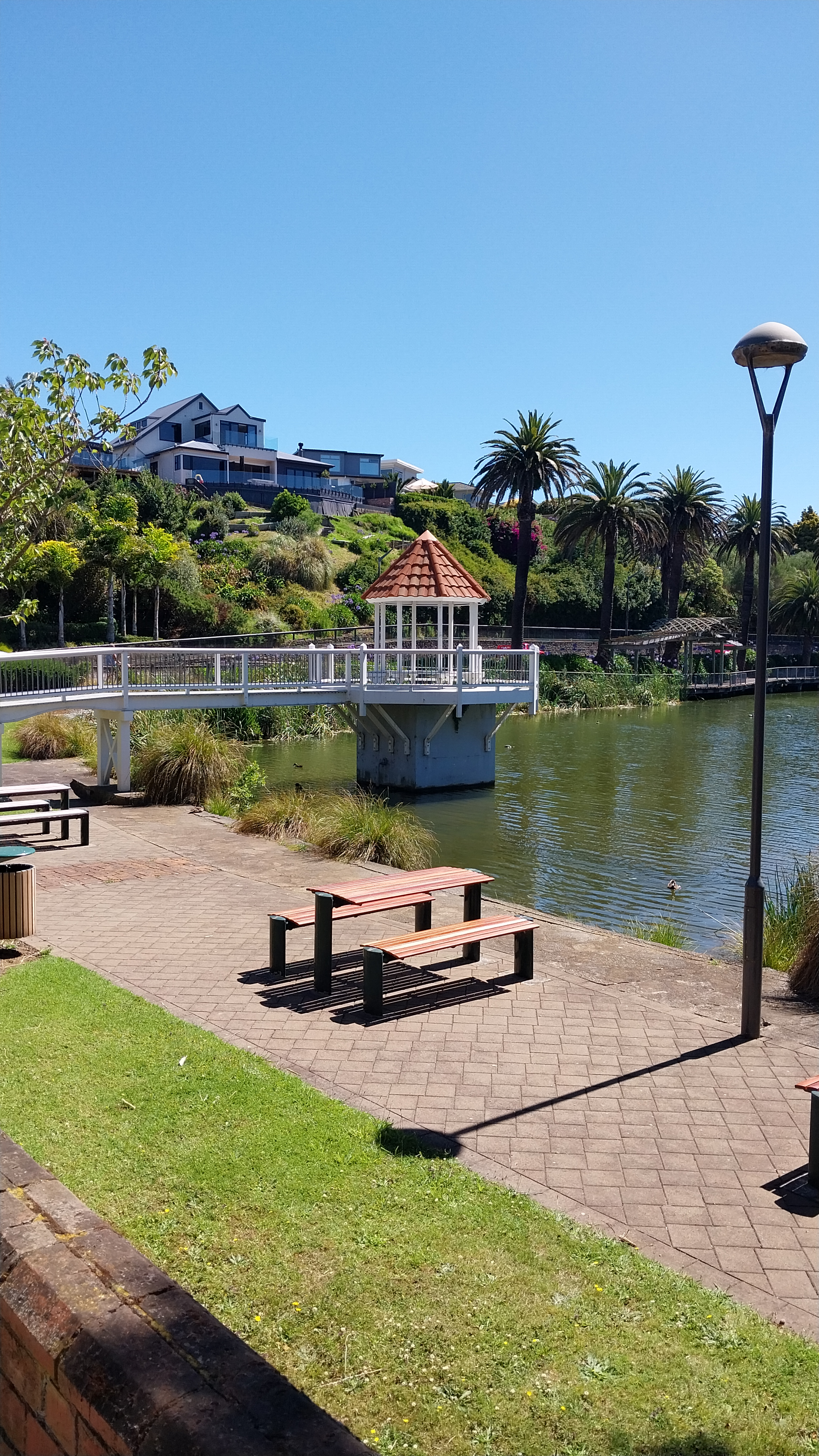
The viewing platform and gazebo which now sit on top of the historic pumphouse in the lake.

There are a number of attractions at the lake and surrounding reserve: the Higginbottom Fountain, winter garden in an Art Deco conservatory and a statue of Tainui. Tainui was the daughter of a local chief, and the statue was sculpted by local sculptor Joan Morrell. In 2022 it was moved within the reserve to a site closer to the lake.

A waka maumahara (memorial canoe) built of Corten steel and decorated by artist Cecelia Kumeroa was unveiled in 2020. It replaced an older canoe which was erected in memory of Pura McGregor, a Whanganui community leader and first Māori woman recipient of an MBE.

A statue of children's story character Peter Pan is also located close to the lake. Sculpted by Cecil Thomas and unveiled in 1967, it is a variant of the sculptor's 1965 sculpture in Dunedin Botanic Gardens.
