= Paul Cotton (diplomat) =

New Zealand public servant, diplomat and journalist (1930–2022)

Paul Cotton CVO QSO

High commissioner of New Zealand to Western Samoa
- In office 1975–1977
- Preceded by: Gray Thorp
- Succeeded by: Don Harper

Ambassador of New Zealand to Greece
- In office 1980–1983

Ambassador of New Zealand to the Philippines
- In office 1984–1988
- Preceded by: Don Holborow
- Succeeded by: Alison Stokes

Personal details
- Born: Paul Charles Cotton; 27 March 1930 Lower Hutt, New Zealand
- Died: 16 July 2022 (aged 92) Sydney, New South Wales, Australia
- Spouse: Gillian Perry Burrell (m. 1956; died 2021)
- Children: 2
- Relatives: Charles Cotton (father)
- Education: Hutt Valley High School; Christ's College
- Alma mater: Victoria University College; London School of Economics
- Occupation: Public servant; diplomat

Paul Charles Cotton CVO QSO (27 March 1930 – 16 July 2022) was a New Zealand public servant, diplomat and journalist. He served as High Commissioner to Samoa from 1975 to 1977, non-resident High Commissioner to Tonga from 1975 to 1976, ambassador to Greece from 1980 to 1983, and ambassador to the Philippines from 1984 to 1988.

== Early life and family ==
Paul Charles Cotton was born in Lower Hutt on 27 March 1930, the son of Hilda Mary Josephine Cotton (née Gibbons) and geologist Charles Cotton. He was educated at Hutt Valley High School, and then Christ's College from 1944 to 1947.

Cotton studied at Victoria University College, graduating with a Master of Arts with third-class honours in 1953, and then the London School of Economics. At Victoria, he was active in student politics, being elected to the men's committee and appointed assistant secretary of the Victoria University College Students' Association in 1950.

Cotton married Gillian Perry Burrell in 1956, and they went on to have two children.

== Foreign affairs career ==
Returning to New Zealand, Cotton joined the Department of External Affairs in 1954 and worked in the Specialised Agencies Division of the Department of External Affairs. In a paper to Cabinet in December 1955, he proposed the formation of a cabinet committee to investigate the peaceful uses of nuclear energy in New Zealand. Following Cotton's recommendation, Cabinet established a committee on atomic energy, which studied the reports from delegates to the "Atoms for Peace" conference in Geneva in 1955, and another committee consisting of the permanent heads of government departments with an interest in developing peaceful uses for atomic energy. Cotton served as secretary to the cabinet committee. Bill Hamilton, head of the Department of Scientific and Industrial Research and chair of the permanent heads committee, prepared a draft policy statement that New Zealand had no need for nuclear power for at least 30 years, which Cotton believed to be "most unsatisfactory". Cotton subsequently redrafted the policy statement, moderating Hamilton's views.

Cotton went on to various overseas postings in Australia, India, Malaysia, and London prior to 1970. In 1970, 1971 and 1973, he was an advisor at sessions of the United Nations General Assembly. He served as New Zealand consul-general in New York from 1973 to 1975, and high commissioner to Samoa from 1975 to 1977 and Tonga from 1975 to 1976.

While high commissioner to Samoa, Cotton visited Tokelau seven times, although he had no official role there. Together with Neil Walter and Rod Gates, Cotton modernised New Zealand's administrative arrangements with Tokelau.

On his return to New Zealand he was appointed head of the Pacific Division and chief of protocol, retaining those positions until his appointment as rapporteur to the 34th session of the Special Political Committee of the United Nations in 1979.

After this he held several ambassadorial positions. He was the New Zealand ambassador to Greece from 1980 to 1983, the Philippines between 1984 and 1988, and consul-general in Sydney from 1991 to 1994.

During this period he returned to the United Nations in 1988 as a special representative. While there Cotton received a cheque of US$500,000 for the New Zealand Agent Orange Trust from the makers of Agent Orange on behalf of Vietnam War veterans affected by the herbicide.

From 1989 to 1990 he was the director of royal visits.

== Te Maori ==
While Cotton was serving as the New Zealand consul-general in New York between 1973 and 1975, he and Douglas Newton, from the Metropolitan Museum of Art, proposed to the American Federation of Arts the idea of a touring exhibition of Māori art. This proposal led to the exhibition Te Maori.

== Later life ==
Following his retirement from the diplomatic service in 1994, Cotton remained living in Sydney where he had been New Zealand consul-general, and was appointed the Australian representative on the New Zealand 2000 task force set up by the New Zealand government to maximise opportunities arising from the 2000 Summer Olympics in Sydney. He also served as the New Zealand Olympic Committee attache in Sydney in the lead-up to and during the 2000 Summer Olympics.

Cotton also wrote for The Dominion as its Sydney columnist, and was a member and treasurer of the Foreign Correspondents' Association. He was the managing director of South Pacific Associates and an emeritus member of the Royal Society of New Zealand.

Cotton died in Sydney on 16 July 2022, at the age of 92, having been predeceased by his wife in 2021.

== Honours and awards ==
In 1977, Cotton was appointed a Commander of the Royal Victorian Order on the occasion of the Queen's visit to Western Samoa. He was made a Companion of the Queen's Service Order in the 1990 Royal Visit Honours, and he was awarded the New Zealand 1990 Commemoration Medal the same year.
