= List of high commissioners of New Zealand to Tonga =

The high commissioner of New Zealand to Tonga is New Zealand's foremost diplomatic representative in the Kingdom of Tonga, and in charge of New Zealand's diplomatic mission in Tonga.

The high commission is located in Nukuʻalofa, Tonga's capital city. New Zealand has maintained a resident high commissioner in Tonga since 1976.

As fellow members of the Commonwealth of Nations, diplomatic relations between New Zealand and Tonga are at governmental level, rather than between heads of state. Thus, the countries exchange high commissioners, rather than ambassadors.

== List of heads of mission ==
=== High commissioners to Tonga ===
==== Non-resident high commissioners to Tonga, resident in Samoa ====
- Richard Taylor (1970–1971)
- Gray Thorp (1971–1975)
- Paul Cotton (1975–1976)

==== Resident high commissioners to Tonga ====
- Don Hunn (1976–1979)
- Rod Gates (1979–1981)
- John Brady (1981–1983)
- Priscilla Williams (1983–1985)
- Graeme Ammundsen (1985–1988)
- John Carter (1988–1991)
- Nigel Moore (1991–1995)
- Ian Hill (1995–1998)
- Brian Smythe (1999–2001)
- Warwick Hawker (2001–2004)
- Michael McBryde (2004–2008)
- Christine Bogle (2008–2010)
- Jonathan Austin (2010–2012)
- Mark Talbot (2012–2015)
- Sarah Walsh (2015–2018)
- Tiffany Babington (2018–2022)
- Matthew Howell (2022–2025)
- Brody Sinclair (2026–)
