= Pura McGregor =

New Zealand community leader

Pura McGregor MBE (née Te Pura Manihera, c. 1855 – 4 March 1920), also known as Pura Makarika, was a community leader in Whanganui, New Zealand, and the first Māori woman to receive an MBE.

== Biography ==
McGregor was born in about 1855 at Karatia on the Whanganui River. Her father was Maui Te Manihera of Ngā Poutama and her mother was Hohi Hori Kingi of Ngāti Ruakā and Ngāti Rangi. Her father was killed in the New Zealand Wars at the Battle of Moutoa in 1864. After her father's death, her mother married Stewart Manson, who owned stores in Whanganui and surrounding settlements. Her uncle was Te Keepa Te Rangihiwinui (Major Kemp), and McGregor accompanied him on his campaigns against Te Kooti during the New Zealand Wars, leading the haka before Te Keepa went into battle.

In 1879, she married Gregor McGregor. McGregor was the son of Scottish settlers; his father was from Uist in the Outer Hebrides. His mother disapproved of her son's marriage to a Māori woman. After the marriage, Gregor ran one of Stewart Manson's stores at Ranana on the Whanganui River, became a canoe-man on the river, was fluent in Māori and became the first station manager of Morikau station at Ranana. They had three children: two sons, Gregor and George Stewart, and a daughter, Rawinia, who died in her teenage years. George married Maata Mahupuku, a muse of Katherine Mansfield.

McGregor resided for most of her married life at 129 Harrison Street in Whanganui, and became a notable community leader. She was president of the Putiki Maori Ladies' Branch of the Lady Liverpool League. She was active in the Wanganui Beautifying Society and enlisted the help of both Pākehā and Māori locals to plant native shrubs and trees around Rotokawau Virginia Lake in Whanganui as well as raising funds.

=== Honour ===
McGregor's work supporting the Māori Expeditionary Force was recognised in the 1919 King's Birthday Honours. Her honour is recorded as an MBE in the 1919 Yearbook and other sources of the time. Other sources record it as an OBE. She was the first Māori woman to receive the honour.

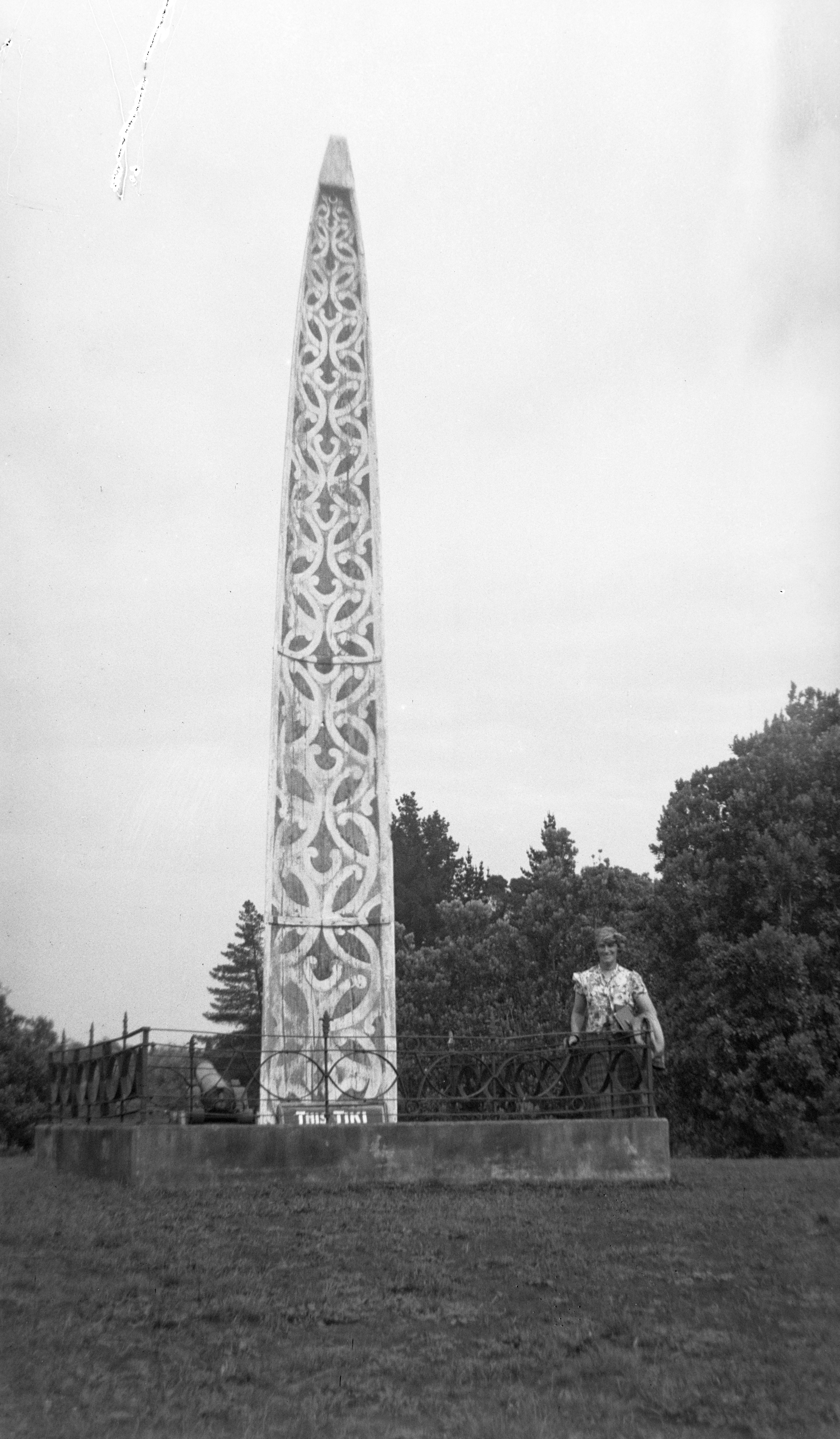
Original waka maumahara dedicated to McGregor, photographed in 1941

== Death and legacy ==
McGregor died in Whanganui on 4 March 1920 and was buried at the Wanganui Old Cemetery, now the Heads Road Cemetery.

In 1921, a waka maumahara (memorial canoe) to McGregor was erected at Toronui Point on Rotokawau Virginia Lake; it consisted of a half tōtara river canoe set with the bow pointing towards the sky. It was decorated with a kowhaiwhai pattern traditional to her marae. The plaque at the base bore the inscription:

"This Tiki is erected to the memory of Mrs Pura McGregor. E whakaturia tenei Tiki hei whakamahara Pura Makarika."

The canoe was removed in about 1987 after it had rotted. It was replaced with a new waka maumahara built of Corten steel for durability and decorated with a design by artist Cecelia Kumeroa; it was unveiled in 2020.

McGregor left her treasured possessions (taonga) to the Whanganui Regional Museum. Artist Alexis Neal, stimulated by seeing McGregor's artefacts during her 2012 Tylee Cottage residency in Whanganui, created a woven woollen cloak and other items for an exhibition held at the Sarjeant Gallery in 2015 in her memory.
