= List of high commissioners of New Zealand to Samoa =

The high commissioner of New Zealand to Samoa is New Zealand's foremost diplomatic representative in Samoa, and in charge of New Zealand's diplomatic mission in Samoa.

The high commission is located in Apia, Samoa's capital city. New Zealand has maintained a resident high commissioner in Samoa since the country's independence in 1962 (from New Zealand).

The high commissioner to Samoa is concurrently accredited as the Consul-General to American Samoa, in which capacity he or she serves under the ambassador to the United States.

As fellow members of the Commonwealth of Nations, diplomatic relations between New Zealand and Samoa are at governmental level, rather than between heads of state. Thus, the countries exchange high commissioners, rather than ambassadors.

== List of heads of mission ==
=== High commissioners from New Zealand to Western Samoa (1962–1997) ===
- Jack Wright (1962–1964)
- Owston Paul Gabites (1964–1968)
- Richard Taylor (1968–1971) (also cross-accredited to Tonga)
- Gray Thorp (1971–1975) (also accredited to Tonga)
- Paul Cotton (1975–1977) (also cross-accredited to Tonga)
- Don Harper (1977–1979)
- Doug Law (1979–1981)
- David Caffin (1981–1983)
- Michael Mansfield (1983–1986)
- Brian Absolum (1986–1988)
- Dick Martin (1988–1991)
- Adrian Simcock (1991–1994)
- Peter Heenan (1994–1997)

=== High commissioners from New Zealand to Samoa (since 1997) ===
- Peter Hamilton (1997–1999)
- Mac Price (1999–2001)
- Penelope Ridings (2001–2004)
- John Adank (2004–2006)
- Caroline Bilkey (2007–2010)
- Nick Hurley (2010–2012)
- Jackie Frizelle (2013–2016)
- David Nicholson (2017–2018)
- Dr Trevor Matheson (2019–2023)
- Si'alei van Toor (2024–present)

== See also ==
- New Zealand–Samoa relations
