= Maata Mahupuku =

Partner of Katherine Mansfield

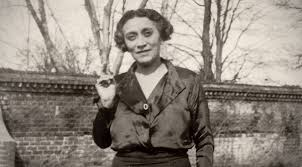
- Born: 10 April 1890; Greytown, Wairarapa, New Zealand
- Died: 15 January 1952 (aged 61); Palmerston North, New Zealand
- Other names: Martha Grace; Martha Asher
- Occupation: Landowner
- Known for: Muse of Katherine Mansfield

Maata Mahupuku, also known as Martha Grace and Martha Asher (10 April 1890 – 15 January 1952), was the muse and lover of short-story writer Katherine Mansfield. Of Māori ancestry, descended from a New Zealand tribal leader, she identified with the Ngati Kahungunu iwi.

== Life ==
Mahupuku was the granddaughter of a Maori chief, Wiremu Mahupuku. She was born in Greytown, Wairarapa, New Zealand , on 10 April 1890. Her father, Richard William Mahupuku, farmed sheep. He died when she was young, and her mother, Emily Sexton, married another sheep farmer, Nathaniel Grace. She became known as Martha Grace.

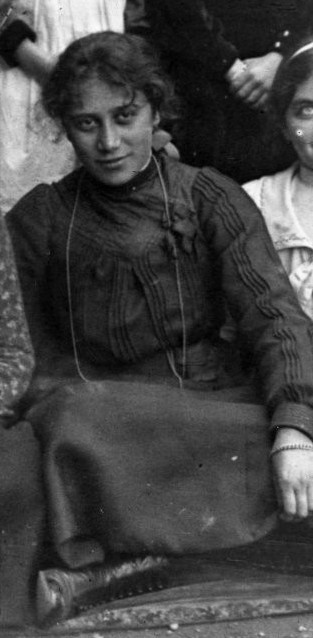
Martha Grace aka Maata Mahupuku in a school photo in 1901

She is best remembered for her relationship with the writer Katherine Mansfield, who was two years older than her, initially while they were both at school in Wellington and then later in London and by correspondence.

Mahupuku inherited substantial land, and despite her lawyer embezzling some of her funds she was a rich woman. Her first husband was George McGregor, the son of well-known Wanganui residents George McGregor and Pura Te Mānihera. She later married a second time and was known at her death as Martha Asher.

Mansfield started a novel about her, which Mahupuku claimed to have a full text of, but after Mansfield's death, only a chapter and a plan were found.
