= Kira Danganan-Azucena =

Filipina diplomat (born 1973)

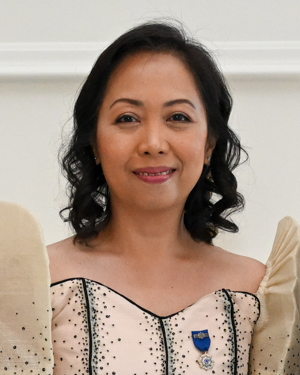
- Danganan-Azucena in 2023

Ambassador of the Philippines to New Zealand
- In office June 13, 2023 – present
- President: Ferdinand R. Marcos Jr.
- Preceded by: Querobine D. Laccay (chargés d’affaires)

Personal details
- Born: Kira Christianne Danganan; August 1973 (age 53) Dumaguete City, Negros Oriental, Philippines
- Spouse: Michael F. Azucena
- Children: 3
- Education: Silliman University
- Profession: Diplomat, public servant

Kira Christianne Danganan-Azucena is a Filipina diplomat. Formerly the assistant secretary for the United Nations and Other International Organizations at the Department of Foreign Affairs (DFA), she is the current Philippine ambassador to New Zealand.

She previously served as chargé d'affaires, a.i. and deputy permanent representative of the Philippines to the United Nations in New York. On February 18, 2020, she was elected chair of the Special Committee on the Charter of the UN and on the Strengthening of the Role of the Organization.

Danganan-Azucena graduated with a degree in mass communication in 1994 from Silliman University.
