= List of ambassadors of New Zealand to the Philippines =

Ambassador of New Zealand to the Philippines
- Coat of Arms of New Zealand
- Incumbent; Catherine McIntosh since 2024
- Style: His Excellency
- Appointer: Governor-General of New Zealand
- Term length: At His Majesty's Pleasure
- Inaugural holder: Mac Chapman
- Formation: 1975

The ambassador of New Zealand to the Philippines is New Zealand's foremost diplomatic representative in the Republic of the Philippines, and in charge of New Zealand's diplomatic mission in the Philippines.

The embassy is located in Manila, the Philippines' capital city. New Zealand has maintained a resident ambassador in the Philippines since 1975.

== List of heads of mission ==
=== Ministers to the Philippines ===
==== Non-resident ministers, resident in Hong Kong ====
- Bill Challis (1966–1968)
- Gray Thorp (1968–1971)

=== Ambassadors to the Philippines ===
==== Non-resident ambassadors, resident in Hong Kong ====
- Richard Taylor (1971–1975)

==== Resident ambassadors ====
- Mac Chapman (1975–1978)
- Barbara Angus (1978–1981)
- David Holborow (1981–1984)
- Paul Cotton (1984–1988)
- Alison Stokes (1988–1992)
- Harle Freeman-Greene (1992–1995)
- Colin Bell (1995–1998)
- Graeme Waters (1998–2001)
- Terry Baker (2001–2004 )
- Rob Moore-Jones (2004–2006)
- David Pine (2006–2008)
- Andrew Matheson (2008–2012)
- Reuben Levermore (2012–2014)
- David Strachan (2014–2019)
- Peter Kell (2019–2024)
- Catherine McIntosh (2024–)
