= Abelard and Heloise =

Abelard and Heloise generally refers to the famous 12th-century Parisian love affair between Peter Abelard and Héloïse d’Argenteuil.

It may also refer to artistic works based on their story:

- Abelard and Heloise (album), 1970, by the Third Ear Band
- Abelard and Heloise, a 1970 play by Ronald Millar
- Abelard and Heloise, a book by Constant Mews

== See also ==
- "Eloisa to Abelard", a poem by Alexander Pope
