= Pentreath (surname) =

Pentreath is a surname. Notable people with the surname include:

- Ben Pentreath, English architectural and interior designer
- David Pentreath (1933–2019), Royal Navy officer and pilot
- Dolly Pentreath (1692–1777), Cornish fishwife
- Guy Pentreath (1902–1985), headmaster of many Anglican schools
- Jonathan Pentreath (born 1966), Royal Navy senior officer
- Richard John Pentreath, British marine scientist
- Timothy Pentreath McClement (born 1951), Royal Navy officer
