= Anthony Jennings =

Anthony Jennings may refer to:

- Anthony Jennings (musician) (1945–1995), New Zealand harpsichordist, organist, choral and orchestral director, and academic
- Anthony Jennings (American football) (born 1994), American college football quarterback
- Anthony Jennings (actor) (born 2000), Filipino-British actor

== See also ==
- Toni Jennings (born 1949), 16th lieutenant governor of Florida
