= Douglas Mews =

New Zealand organist

Douglas Christopher Mews (born 1956), is a New Zealand classical organist and harpsichordist and he is also a composer. He holds the position of City Organist, Wellington, New Zealand. He is the brother of Constant Mews.

== Biography ==
Mews was the son of composer and organist Douglas Mews and his wife Nancy Radius; his brother is Constant Mews. He was born in England. He was educated at St Peter's College, Auckland. He began playing the organ at St Patrick's Cathedral, Auckland, where his father (and first organ teacher) Dr Douglas Mews was choir conductor in the 1970s. He continued his organ studies privately with Kenneth Weir. He graduated from University of Auckland with a master's degree in organ and harpsichord in 1979, having studied with Anthony Jennings, a former student of Maxwell Fernie. He then continued his harpsichord studies with Bob van Asperen at the Royal Conservatory of The Hague, gaining Certificaat Koninkijk Cons.

At The Hague, Mews also expanded his interest in historical keyboards to include the Fortepiano. He presently holds the position of Artist Teacher in keyboard and as an early music specialist. at the New Zealand School of Music, Victoria University of Wellington. He broadcasts for Radio New Zealand Concert and tours for Chamber Music New Zealand. He is the Wellington City Organist and is choir director at St Teresa's church, Karori, Wellington; he has recorded performances, including the Haydn Trios with Flute and Cello. In 2009 he toured Europe, giving concerts in Edinburgh, Oxford, Salzburg and Béziers in the south of France.

As well as his academic work, Mews has continued his contribution to the musical life of Wellington in conducting concerts and giving keyboard recitals. He is also a composer of Catholic liturgical music.

== Discography ==
- Douglas Mews, "The Norman and Beard Organ of Wellington Town Hall, New Zealand", Great Australasian Organs Vol. VIII, Priory records, United Kingdom, 2010.
- Douglas Mews, The Lost Chord: Played with immense success by Mr Douglas Mews on the Wellington Town Hall Grand Organ, recorded 2012, Anthony Donovan, Mary Adams Design, Stebbing Ltd, Wellington, 2012.
