= Jennifer Mary Weller =

New Zealand anaesthesiology academic

Jennifer Weller
- Education: University of Auckland
- Scientific career
- Workplaces: Wellington Hospital, New Zealand, University of Otago, Wellington, Auckland Hospital, University of Auckland
- Thesis: Evaluation of simulation-based education in the management of medical emergencies (2005)
- Website: unidirectory.auckland.ac.nz/profile/j-weller

Jennifer Mary Weller is a New Zealand anaesthesiology academic, who is currently a full professor at the University of Auckland.

== Academic career ==
Weller graduated from University of Adelaide, with her post-graduation training in hospitals in Canberra, Nottingham and Adelaide. She moved to Wellington Hospital in 1994 as a full-time specialist anaesthetist, eventually taking a Masters of Clinical Education from the University of New South Wales and taking on teaching at Victoria University of Wellington as well as medical duties. A move to Auckland and the University of Auckland led to a PhD in 2005. She rose to full professor in 2017.

Much of Weller's research involved MORSim, an operating theatre simulator used for training surgical teams.

== Selected works ==
- Weller, Jennifer M. "Simulation in undergraduate medical education: bridging the gap between theory and practice." Medical education 38, no. 1 (2004): 32–38.
- Webster, C. S., A. F. Merry, L. Larsson, K. A. McGrath, and Jennifer Weller. "The frequency and nature of drug administration error during anaesthesia." Anaesthesia and intensive care 29, no. 5 (2001): 494.
- Jensen, L. S., A. F. Merry, C. S. Webster, Jennifer Weller, and L. Larsson. "Evidence‐based strategies for preventing drug administration errors during anaesthesia." Anaesthesia 59, no. 5 (2004): 493–504.
- Weller, Jennifer, Matt Boyd, and David Cumin. "Teams, tribes and patient safety: overcoming barriers to effective teamwork in healthcare." Postgraduate medical journal (2014): postgradmedj-2012.
- Weller, J. M., M. Bloch, S. Young, M. Maze, S. Oyesola, J. Wyner, D. Dob et al. "Evaluation of high fidelity patient simulator in assessment of performance of anaesthetists." British Journal of Anaesthesia 90, no. 1 (2003): 43–47.
