= Letters of Abelard and Heloise =

12th century love letters

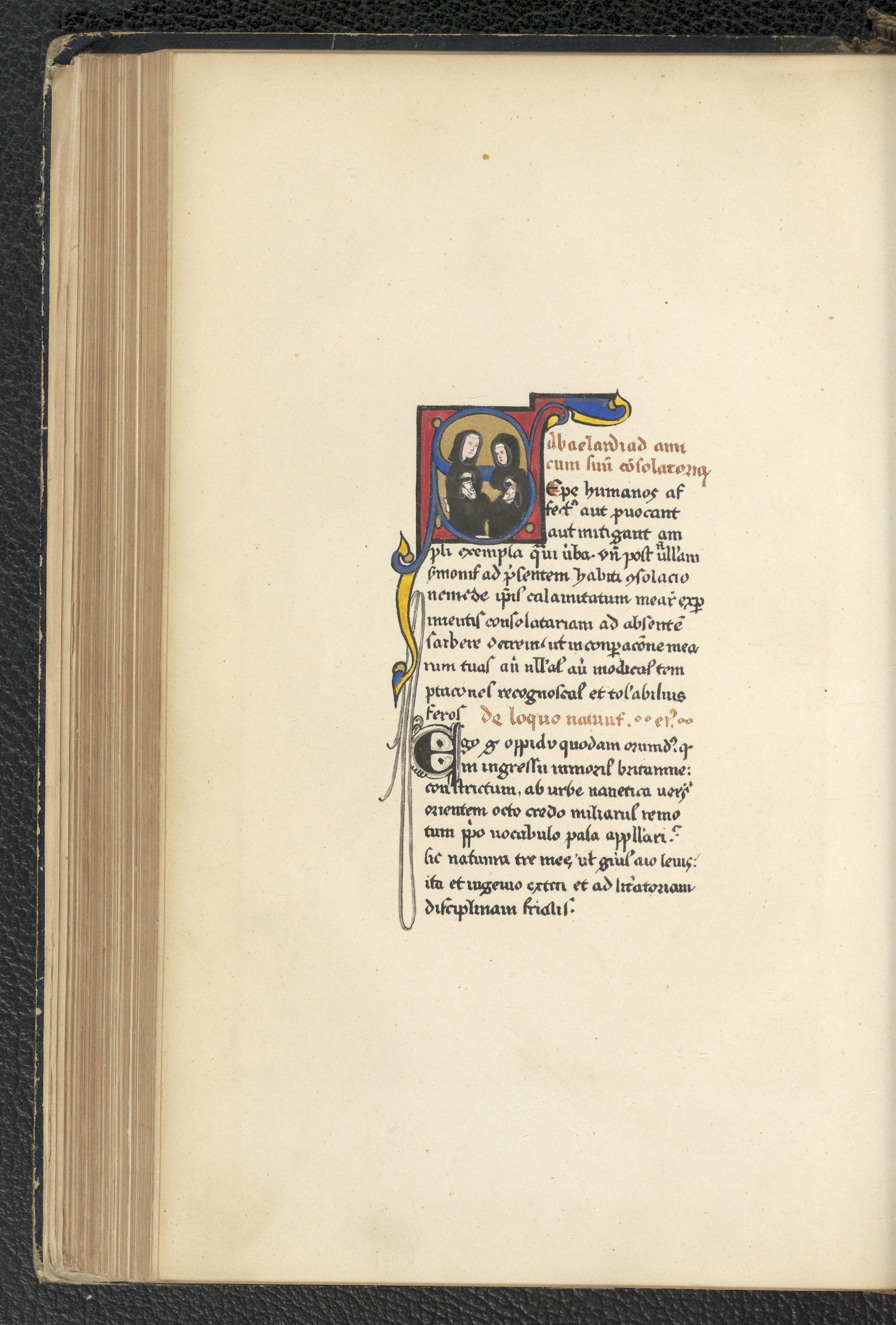
- Facsimile of a page from an illustrated manuscript
- Author: Peter Abelard and Heloise
- Original title: Epistolae Abaelardi et Heloisae
- Language: Latin
- Genre: Epistolary literature
- Publication date: 12th century
- Publication place: France
- Dewey Decimal: 189.4
- LC Class: PA8201 .A4
- Original text: Epistolae Abaelardi et Heloisae at Latin Wikisource
- Translation: Letters of Abelard and Heloise at Wikisource

The Letters of Abelard and Heloise (Latin: Epistolae Abaelardi et Heloisae) are two series of passionate and intellectual correspondence apparently written in Latin during the 12th century. The purported authors, Peter Abelard, a prominent theologian, and his pupil, Heloise, a gifted young woman later renowned as an abbess, exchanged these letters following their ill-fated love affair and subsequent monastic lives.

The letters reveal the personal and intellectual relationship between Abelard and Heloise, and provide an intimate glimpse into the societal context of 12th-century Europe. They've played a significant role in the development of Western epistolary literature, attracting attention from historians, literary scholars, and general readers alike. The Letters of Abelard and Heloise also serve as primary source documents on questions of medieval gender roles, love, and monastic life.

Donald Ostrowski grouped the two series as follows:

- AH-1: The first set of 15 letters, found in Latin and translated to French by author Jean de Meun in the 1280s.
  - 9 letters attributed to Abelard, 4 of which were addressed to Heloise. The first of these four is the Historia Calamitatum.
  - 6 letters attributed to Heloise, 3 of which were addressed to Abelard, and 1 to Peter the Venerable.
- AH-2: The second set of 113 anonymous letters, called Epistolae Duorum Amantium, transcribed in the late 15th century by the monk Johannes de Vepria (c. 1445–c. 1515), prior of Clairvaux Abbey (1480–1499).
  - These 113 letters are anonymous, describing interactions between a male teacher and a female student, whose relationship went beyond the academic.

== AH-1: set of 15 letters ==
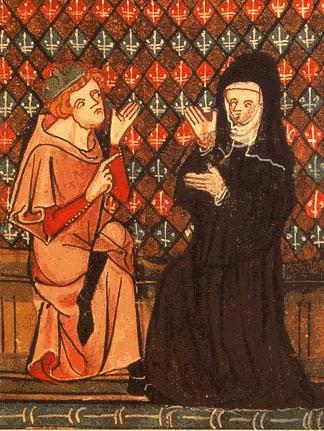
Abelard and Héloïse in a manuscript of the Roman de la Rose (14th century)

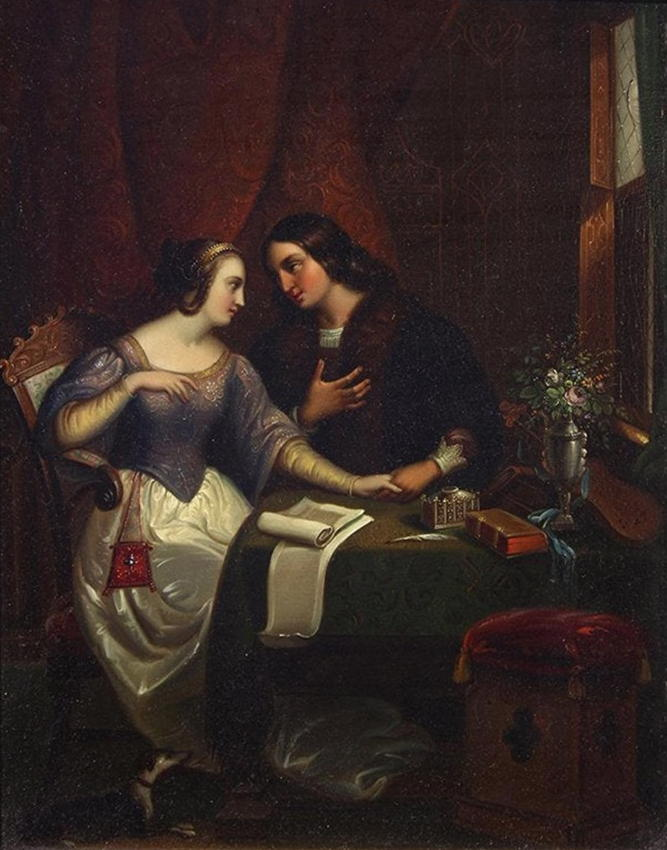
Jean-Baptiste Goyet, Héloïse et Abailard, oil on copper, c. 1829.

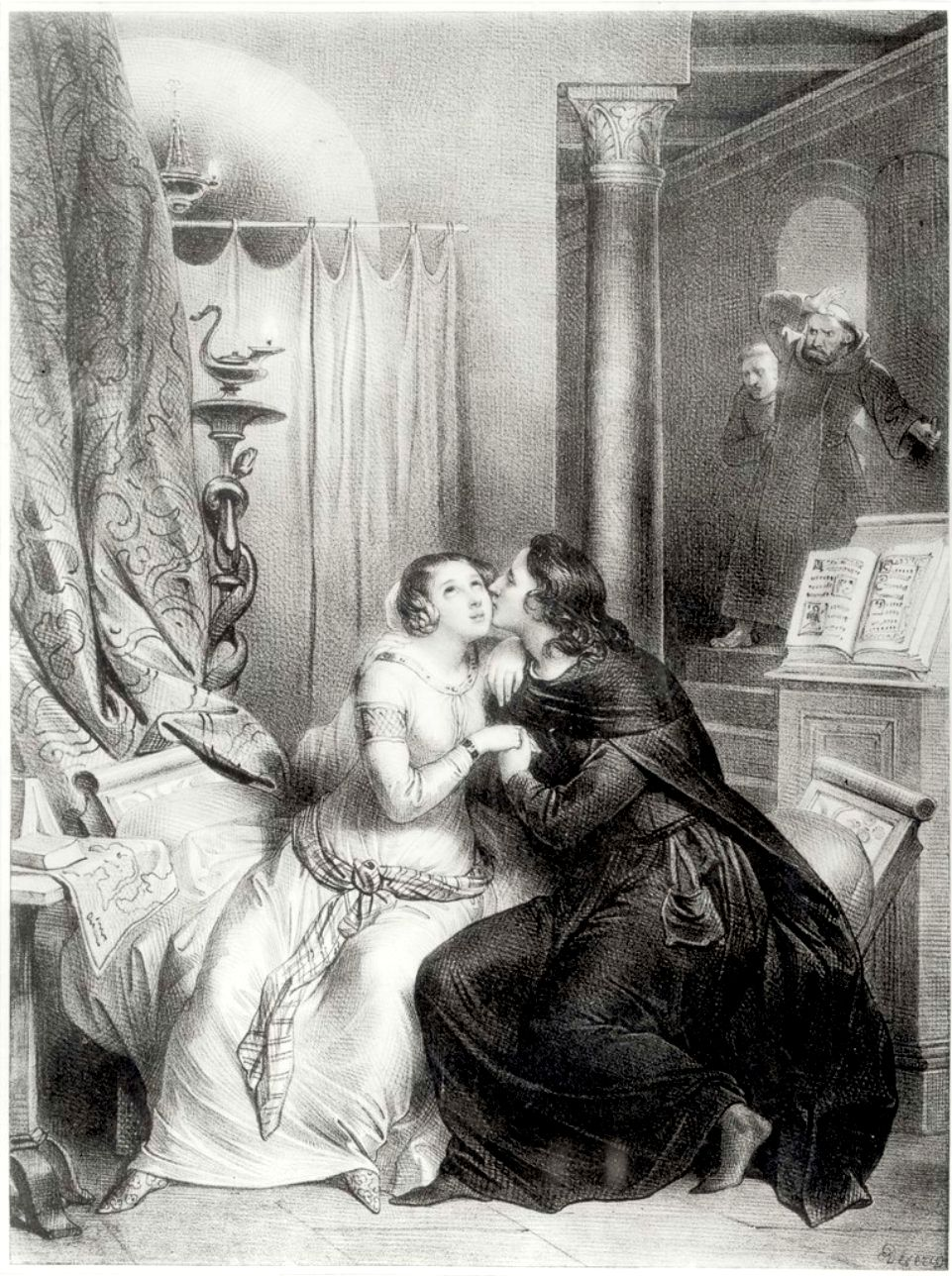
Heloise and Abelard, Achille Devaria, 19th c. engraving

The story of Abelard and Héloïse has proved immensely popular in modern European culture. This story is known almost entirely from a few sources: first, the Historia Calamitatum; secondly, the seven letters between Abelard and Héloïse which survive (three written by Abelard, and four by Héloïse), and always follow the Historia Calamitatum in the manuscript tradition; thirdly, four letters between Peter the Venerable and Héloïse (three by Peter, one by Héloïse). (Note: In the Latin categorising of Abelard's work, these are numbered Epistolae 2–8, because the Historia calamitatum (which takes the form of a letter) is termed Epistolae 1.) They are, in modern times, the best known and most widely translated parts of Abelard's work.

=== AH-1 early indications ===
It is unclear quite how the letters of Abelard and Héloïse came to be preserved. There are brief and factual references to their relationship by 12th-century writers including William Godel and Walter Map. While the letters were most likely exchanged by horsemen in a public (open letter) fashion readable by others at stops along the way (and thus explaining Heloise's interception of the Historia), it seems unlikely that the letters were widely known outside of their original travel range during the period. Rather, the earliest manuscripts of the letters are dated to the late 13th century. It therefore seems likely that the letters sent between Abelard and Héloïse were kept by Héloïse at the Paraclete along with the 'Letters of Direction', and that more than a century after her death they were brought to Paris and copied.

Shortly after the deaths of Abelard and Heloise, Chrétien de Troyes appears influenced by Heloise's letters and Abelard's castration in his depiction of the fisher king in his grail tales. In the fourteenth century, the story of their love affair was summarised by Jean de Meun in the Le Roman de la Rose. Chaucer makes a brief reference in the Wife of Bath's Prologue (lines 677–8) and may base his character of the wife partially on Heloise. Petrarch owned an early 14th-century manuscript of the couple's letters (and wrote detailed approving notes in the margins).

=== AH-1 first known publications ===
The first Latin publication of the letters was in Paris in 1616, simultaneously in two editions. These editions gave rise to numerous translations of the letters into European languages – and consequent 18th- and 19th-century interest in the story of the medieval lovers. In the 18th century, the couple were revered as tragic lovers, who endured adversity in life but were united in death. With this reputation, they were the only individuals from the pre-Revolutionary period whose remains were given a place of honour at the newly founded cemetery of Père Lachaise in Paris. At this time, they were effectively revered as romantic saints; for some, they were forerunners of modernity, at odds with the ecclesiastical and monastic structures of their day and to be celebrated more for rejecting the traditions of the past than for any particular intellectual achievement.

The Historia was first published in 1841 by John Caspar Orelli of Turici. Then, in 1849, Victor Cousin published Petri Abaelardi opera, in part based on the two Paris editions of 1616 but also based on the reading of four manuscripts; this became the standard edition of the letters. Soon after, in 1855, Migne printed an expanded version of the 1616 edition under the title Opera Petri Abaelardi, without the name of Héloïse on the title page.

=== AH-1 critical editions and authenticity ===
Critical editions of the Historia Calamitatum and the letters were subsequently published in the 1950s and 1960s. The most well-established documents, and correspondingly those whose authenticity has been disputed the longest, are the series of letters that begin with the Historia Calamitatum (counted as letter 1) and encompass four "personal letters" (numbered 2–5) and "letters of direction" (numbers 6–8).

By the early 2000s, most scholars accepted these works as having been written by Héloïse and Abelard themselves. John F. Benton (died 1988) had been the most prominent modern skeptic of these documents since 1972, although he retracted some of his earlier arguments against authenticity in 1980, acknowledging they were not as strong as he initially thought. Etienne Gilson, Peter Dronke, Constant Mews, and Mary Ellen Waithe maintain the mainstream view that the letters are genuine, arguing that the skeptical viewpoint is fueled in large part by its advocates' pre-conceived notions. (Note: For what the Epistolae project at Columbia University calls "a sensible discussion of the problem," see Newman (1992).)

== AH-2: set of 113 letters (Epistolae Duorum Amantium) ==
=== AH-2 origins and contents ===
The second set of 113 anonymous letters, called Epistolae Duorum Amantium, was transcribed in the late 15th century by the monk Johannes de Vepria (c. 1445–c. 1515), prior of Clairvaux Abbey (1480–1499). These 113 letters are anonymous, but most of them start with a letter V or M, which is customarily interpreted to mean Vir ("Man") and Mulier ("Woman"). These letters describe interactions between a male teacher and a female student, whose relationship went beyond the academic. It was not until the 20th century that this set became the subject of significant scholarly interest after suggestions that this Man and Woman were in fact Abelard and Heloise, known from the set of 15 letters.

Since 1974, there have been arguments that the second series of 113 anonymous letters, scholarly known as the Epistolae Duorum Amantium ("Epistles of Two Lovers"), were in fact written by Héloïse and Abelard during their initial romance (and, thus, before the later and more broadly known series of letters). If genuine, these letters represent a significant expansion to the corpus of surviving writing by Héloïse, and thus open several new directions for further scholarship. But because the second set of letters is anonymous, and attribution "is of necessity based on circumstantial rather than on absolute evidence," their authorship is still a subject of debate and discussion.

In 2022, Rüdiger Schnell argued that a close reading reveals the letters as parody, ridiculing their supposed authors by characterizing the male writer as boastful and macho, while simultaneously humiliating himself in pursuit of his correspondent, and the female writer, ostensibly an exemplar of ideal love, as a seeker of sexual pleasure under the cover of religious vocabulary.

=== AH-2 authorship debates ===
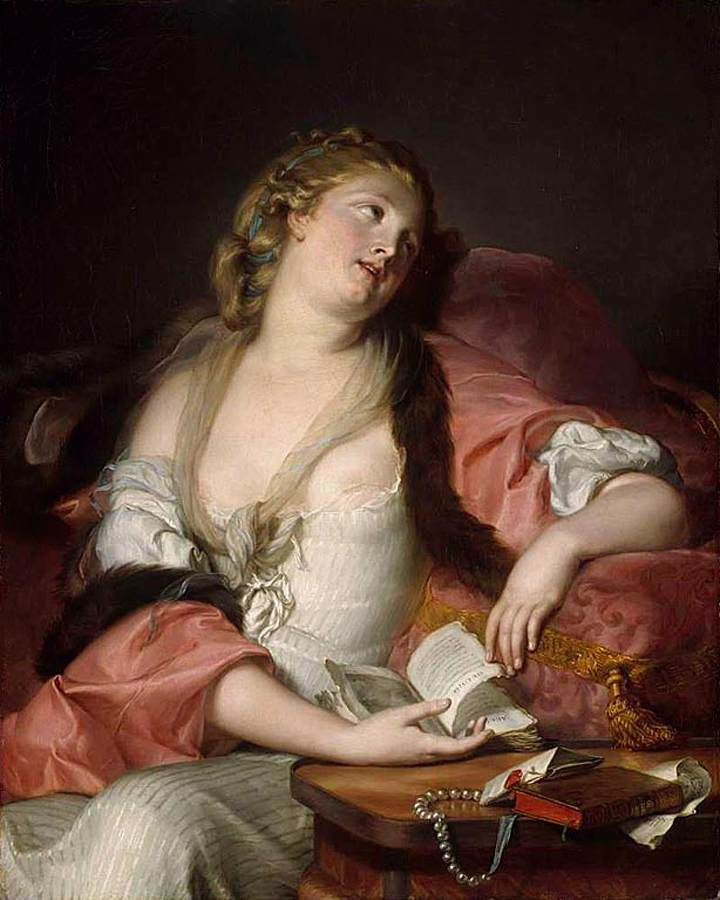
Lady Reading the Letters of Heloise and Abelard (Bernard d'Agesci, c. 1780)

The first to suggest attributing the Epistolae Duorum Amantium to Heloise and Abelard was German medieval philologist Ewald Könsgen, who published an edition of the 113 letters as part of his 1974 dissertation. By 1992, American medievalist Barbara Newman wrote that these 113 letters were "letters in a model collection", adding that Könsgen's suggestion that they were written by Abelard and Heloise "has found little favor." In 1999, however, this argument was accepted and advanced by Australian medievalist Constant Mews (who labelled them The Lost Love Letters of Heloise and Abelard), based on the earlier work by Könsgen. Newman (changing her 1992 position), C. Stephen Jaeger and some other scholars immediately accepted Mews's claim. On the other hand, Dronke and von Moos, who had previously been vocal defenders of the authenticity of the 15 letters of AH-1, rejected the attributions of the 113 letters of AH-2 to Abelard and Heloise.

In 2005, American Latinist Jan M. Ziolkowski outlined the arguments advanced by Mews and Newman as resting on three pillars ("Newman's taxonomy"):

1. "learned women did exchange Latin poems and letters with their male admirers in the early twelfth century";
2. "the fragmentary narrative that emerges from the recently discovered letters is consistent in all particulars with what we know of Abelard and Heloise";
3. "most important, the philosophical vocabulary, literary style, classical allusions, and contrasting positions on love apparent in Könsgen's letters are so thoroughly consistent with the known writings of Heloise and Abelard that the supposition of their authorship is simpler than any alternative hypothesis."

Ziolkowski accepted the first pillar, but disputed the second and third. An argument that plagued the earlier AH-1 authorship debates, namely suggesting that Heloise did not write the letters attributed to her (but that Abelard did, or that all 15 letters were fabricated by a third person) would amount to suppressing medieval women's voices, resurfaced in the AH-2 authorship debates, where the argument became more problematic. Ziolkowski pointed out that there could have been many other such love affairs between an unnamed male teacher and an unnamed female student in medieval Europe, other than the one between Abelard and Heloise, so the second pillar does not hold up. Ostrowski (2020) added that if this unnamed woman was a different, real historical person, her voice would be silenced if these letters were to be misattributed to Heloise instead. Jaeger (2005) had earlier characterised the letters ascribed to the woman (M) as being far superior in poetic literary quality to those of the man (V), who allegedly wrote only mediocre verses by comparison. Ziolkowski did not contest the M letters' superior quality, but argued that the mediocre quality of the V letters did not match the literary genius commonly ascribed to Abelard. Dronke (2003) dated the AH-2 collection to the 14th century, and argued that the poetic style of the M letters mismatched with that of Heloise's letters in AH-1. Therefore, Ziolkowski, Dronke and others rejected the third pillar of stylistic consistency.

== Bibliography ==
- Ostrowski, Donald (2020). "Did Abelard and Heloise Write the Letters Attributed to Them?". Who Wrote That? Authorship Controversies from Moses to Sholokhov. Cornell University Press. pp. 91–123. doi:10.7591/cornell/9781501749704.001.0001. ISBN 978-1-5017-4970-4.
