= Jean Jolivet =

French philosopher and medievalist

Jean Jolivet (9 January 1925 – 8 March 2018) was a French philosopher and medievalist. He was an authority on Medieval philosophy and honorary director of studies at the École Pratique des Hautes Études in Paris. He was co-director of the publication series "Études de philosophie médiévale" (founded by Étienne Gilson) for the Vrin Library of philosophy. Jolivet has been an influential mentor for, and collaborator with, Constant Mews, particularly in relation to Peter Abelard.

In 1997, a book was published honoring his work, titled Langages et philosophie. Hommage à Jean Jolivet. (Its English title is Languages and Philosophy: A Tribute to Jean Jolivet.)

== Publications ==
Amongst Jolivet's publications are:

- Perspectives médiévales et arabes, Vrin, 2006
- Le siècle de saint Bernard et Abélard, Fayard, 1982
- La Théologie et les arabes, Editions du Cerf, 2002
- La Théologie d'Abélard, Editions du Cerf, 1997
