= University of Auckland =

Public university in Auckland, New Zealand

Coordinates: 36.85°S 174.77°E

- Waipapa Taumata Rau (Māori)
- Coat of arms of the University of Auckland
- Other name: Auckland University
- Motto: Ingenio et labore (Latin)
- Motto in English: By natural ability and hard work
- Type: Public research university
- Established: 1883 (143 years ago)
- Affiliations: ACU, APAIE, APRU, Universitas 21, WUN
- Endowment: NZD $423.4 million (net assets of the University of Auckland Foundation, 31 December 2025)
- Budget: NZD $1.63 billion (group revenue, year ended 31 December 2025)
- Chancellor: Cecilia Tarrant
- Vice-Chancellor: Nic Smith
- Academic staff: 2,454 (FTE, 2025)
- Administrative staff: 3,796 (professional staff, FTE, 2025)
- Total staff: 6,250 (FTE, 2025)
- Students: 39,183 (EFTS, 2025); 49,901 (headcount, 2025)
- Undergraduates: 28,266 (EFTS, 2025)
- Postgraduates: 10,913 (EFTS, 2025)
- Doctoral students: 2,359 (EFTS, 2025)
- Location: Auckland, New Zealand
- Campus: City Campus: 16 hectares (40 acres); Grafton Campus: 2.75 hectares (6.8 acres); Newmarket Campus: 5.2 hectares (13 acres); Urban
- Student Union: AUSA
- Student Magazine: Craccum
- Colours: Auckland Dark Blue and White
- Website: auckland.ac.nz

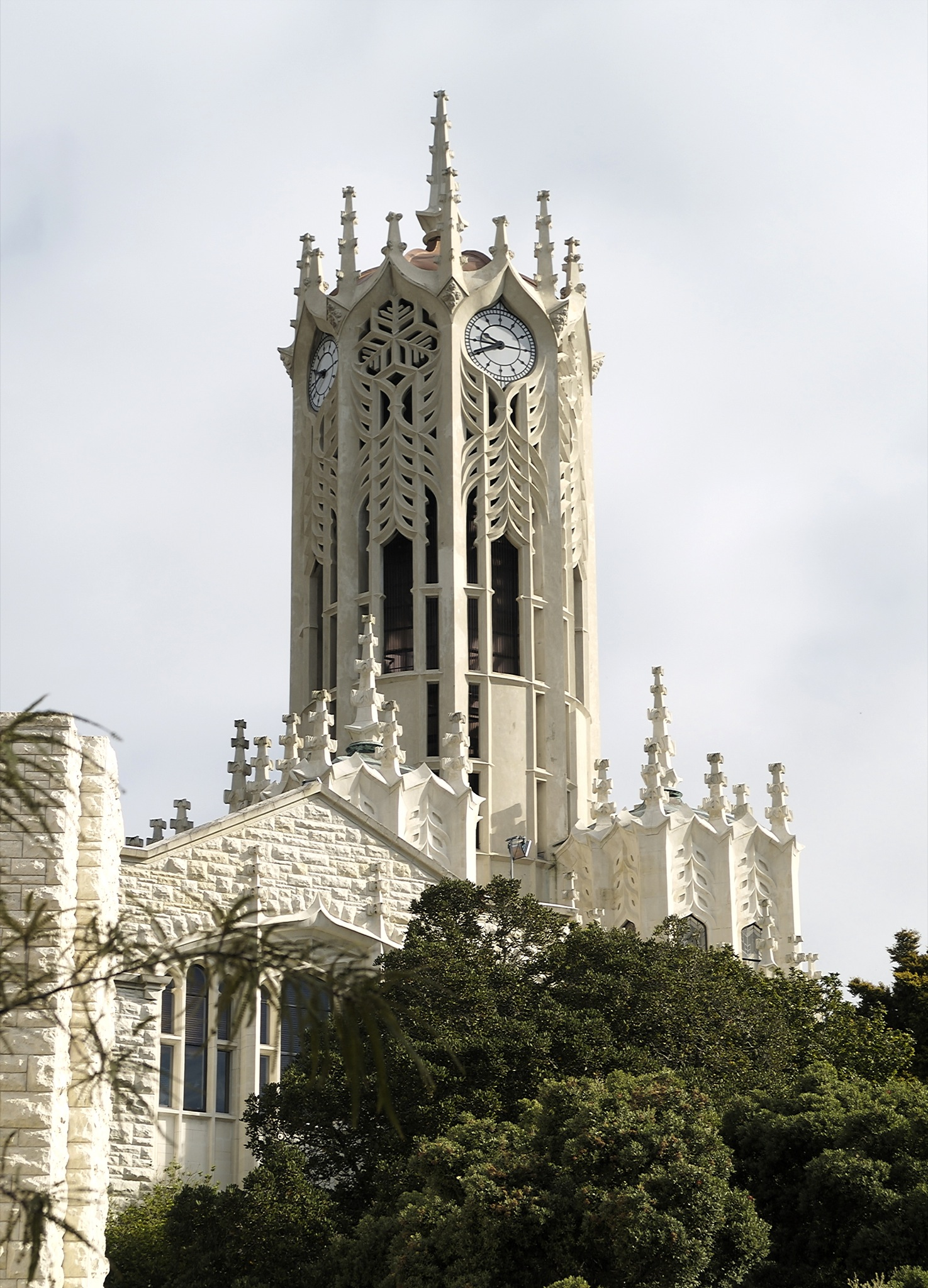
The ClockTower on the City Campus, completed in 1926 as the college's first permanent building. It is registered as a Category I historic place.

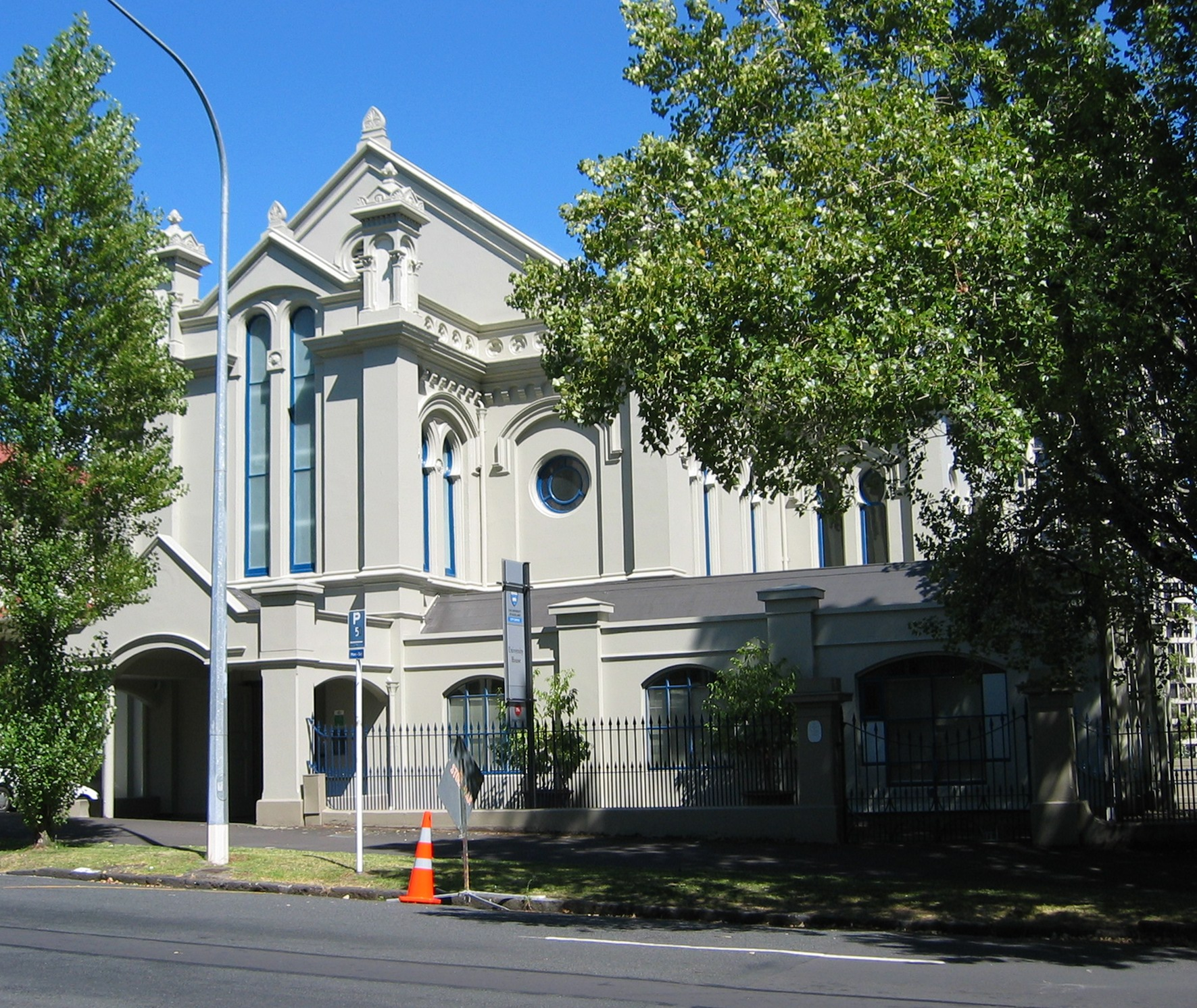
University House, a former synagogue, leased by the university

The University of Auckland (UoA; Māori: Waipapa Taumata Rau) is a public research university in Auckland, New Zealand. It was established under the Auckland University College Act 1882 as Auckland University College, a constituent college of the University of New Zealand, and was formally opened in 1883. In its early years the college operated from a disused courthouse and jail. It became an autonomous university under the University of Auckland Act 1961 and is administered under that Act together with the Education and Training Act 2020. Its Māori name, Waipapa Taumata Rau, was gifted by Ngāti Whātua Ōrākei in 2021.

The university is the largest in New Zealand by enrolment. In 2025 it recorded 39,183 equivalent full-time students (EFTS), an increase of 2,580 EFTS (7.1 per cent) on 2024, and a total headcount of 49,901 students. Teaching and research are concentrated on three campuses in central Auckland: the City Campus, which is the historic core; the Grafton Campus, home of the Faculty of Medical and Health Sciences; and the Newmarket Campus, developed on the former Lion Breweries site that the university bought in 2013.

Following a consolidation that took effect on 1 January 2025, the university is organised into six faculties, alongside the Liggins Institute, the Auckland Bioengineering Institute and other centres. It is the highest-ranked New Zealand university in the QS, Times Higher Education and Academic Ranking of World Universities tables.

== History ==
=== Auckland University College ===
Auckland University College was set up by the Auckland University College Act 1882 as a constituent college of the University of New Zealand, and was formally opened by the Governor, Sir William Jervois, at a ceremony in the Choral Hall on 21 May 1883. The college had no permanent site for its first four decades: teaching began in the disused District Court House and later extended into Admiralty House and the original Parliament Building, and the college acquired its first permanent building, now the ClockTower, in 1926.

The four founding professors were selected in England by the New Zealand Agent-General, Sir Francis Dillon Bell: Frederick Douglas Brown (chemistry), Algernon Phillips Withiel Thomas (natural science), Thomas George Tucker (classics and English) and George Walker (mathematics). Walker drowned in a boating accident on the Waitematā Harbour within days of arriving in Auckland; until his successor, William Steadman Aldis, arrived later in 1883, Thomas and Brown taught mathematics in addition to their own subjects. The college enrolled 95 students in 1883 and 156 by 1901; most studied part-time, and many were trainee teachers or law clerks.

=== Academic freedom and early research ===
Research was neither expected nor commonly undertaken in the college's early decades, and the library did not subscribe even to mathematical journals. During the Depression of the early 1930s the college experienced its first dispute over academic freedom, when the temporary lectureship of the historian J. C. Beaglehole was terminated; his supporters believed that the decision followed a letter he had written to a newspaper defending the right of communists to distribute their literature. The College Council subsequently adopted resolutions in favour of academic freedom.

In 1934 four new professors arrived: H.G. Forder (mathematics), Arthur Sewell (English), C. G. Cooper (classics) and James Rutherford (history).

=== Autonomy and expansion ===
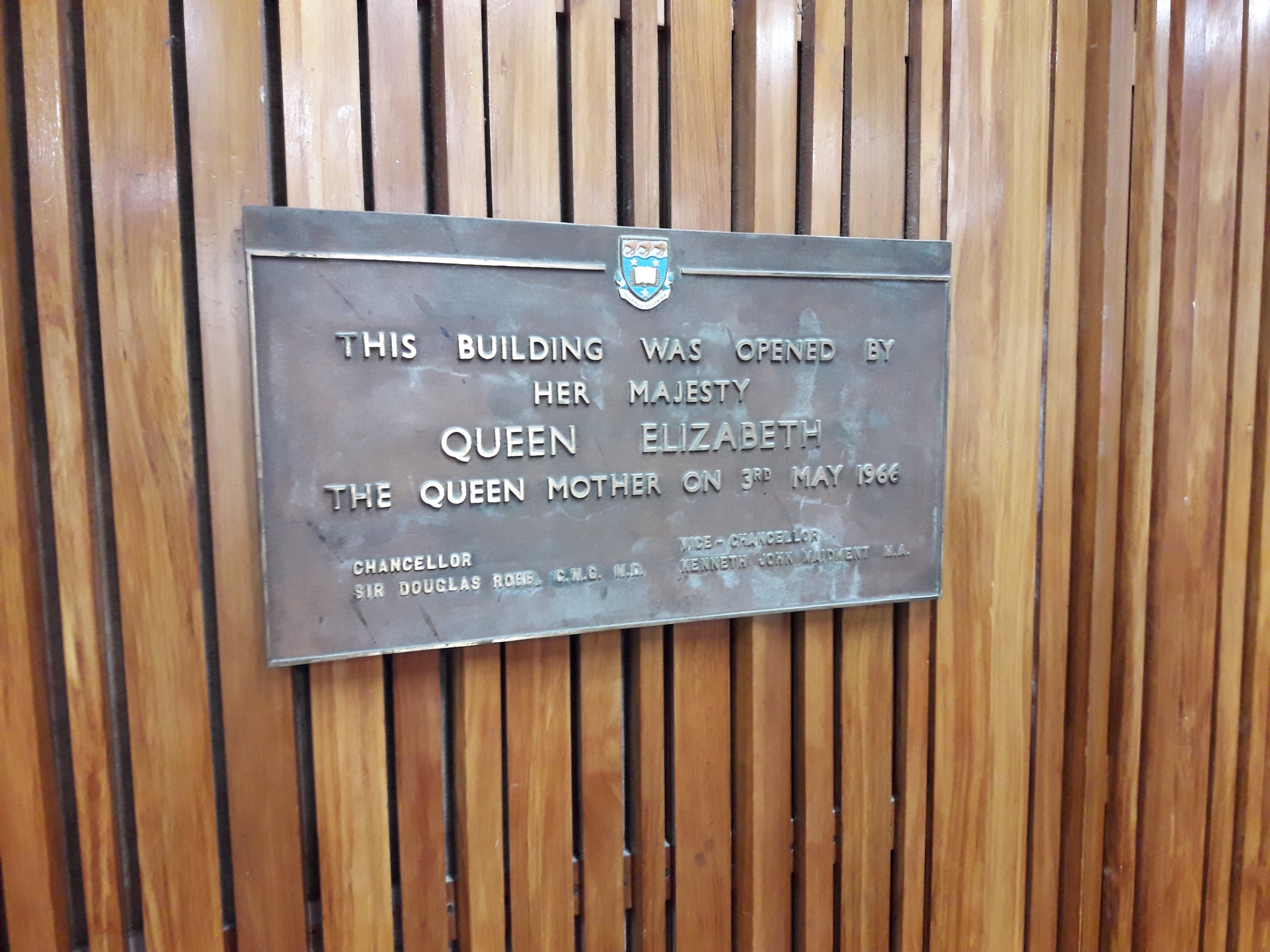
Plaque commemorating the opening of the Science Centre of the University of Auckland by the Queen Mother in 1966

The college appointed its first academic head in 1950, when K. J. Maidment of Merton College, Oxford, became principal (later vice-chancellor); he held office for two decades. Legislation in 1957 renamed the college the University of Auckland, although the powers of the University of New Zealand remained intact. The roll rose to 4,000 by 1959, and new subjects, including geography, anthropology, Māori studies and fine arts, were introduced during the decade. The University of New Zealand was dissolved at the end of 1961, and under the University of Auckland Act 1961 the university became independent in 1962.

A large building programme followed in the 1960s and 1970s. The Leigh Marine Laboratory was established in 1964, and teaching began in the new Medical School on the Grafton Campus in 1968. In 1966 the lecturers Keith Sinclair and Bob Chapman founded the University of Auckland Art Collection with the purchase of paintings and drawings by Colin McCahon; the collection is now managed by the Centre for Art Research at the Gus Fisher Gallery. In the same year Queen Elizabeth The Queen Mother opened Stage A of the Science building, on 3 May. Marie Clay and Patricia Bergquist, appointed in 1975 and 1981 respectively, were the university's first two women professors.

=== Growth and consolidation ===
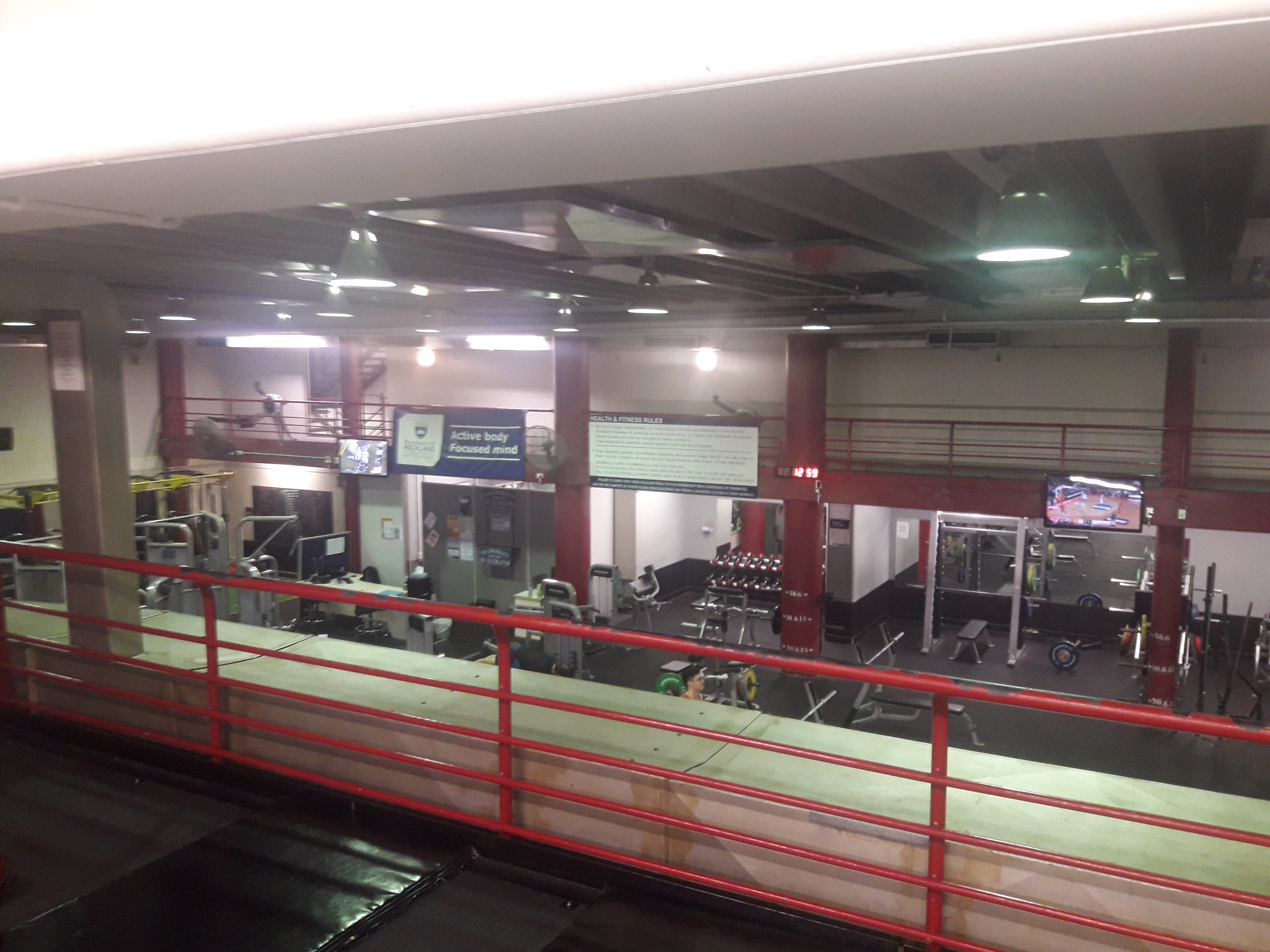
Inside the Recreation Centre of the University of Auckland, City Campus in 2019. It was replaced by the Hiwa Recreation Centre in late 2024.

Queen Elizabeth II opened the new School of Medicine Building at Grafton on 24 March 1970, and the Liggins Institute in 2002. A North Shore Campus in Takapuna, opened in 2001, offered the Bachelor of Business and Information Management and had its own library; it closed at the end of 2006, when the degree moved to the City Campus.

On 1 September 2004 the Auckland College of Education merged with the university's School of Education, previously part of the Faculty of Arts, to form a Faculty of Education, which was based at the former college's Epsom Campus and was renamed the Faculty of Education and Social Work in 2015. The faculty also taught at a campus in Whangārei. It moved to the City Campus in 2024 and in 2025 became part of the new Faculty of Arts and Education.

John Hood, vice-chancellor from 1999, left in mid-2004 to become vice-chancellor of the University of Oxford. He was succeeded in January 2005 by Stuart McCutcheon, formerly vice-chancellor of Victoria University of Wellington. McCutcheon retired in early 2020 and was succeeded in March 2020 by Dawn Freshwater, formerly vice-chancellor of the University of Western Australia and the first woman to hold the office.

A building programme between 2000 and 2007 added the Kate Edger Information Commons and an extension to the Science Centre, and culminated in the completion of the Sir Owen G. Glenn Building for the Business School in 2007. The Business School holds accreditation from AMBA, EQUIS and AACSB.

In 2009 the university adopted a Campus Development Strategy, which the New Zealand Herald later described as a NZ$1 billion ten-year programme. Early projects included a redevelopment of the Grafton Campus, budgeted at NZ$240 million, of which the Boyle Building was completed in 2012. In 2013 the university bought a 5.2-hectare former Lion Breweries site in Newmarket; the campus opened in May 2015, with the Faculty of Engineering and parts of the Faculty of Science occupying its first facilities. The NZ$200 million Science Centre was completed in 2016 and formally opened in 2017. The NZ$280 million Engineering Building (Building 405) was completed in late 2019 and opened for teaching in 2020, and Building 507, a NZ$116 million home for the Faculty of Medical and Health Sciences on which construction began in 2017, opened in Grafton in March 2020.

The Council approved a replacement for the 1978 Recreation Centre in 2018; demolition began in 2020, and the Hiwa Recreation Centre opened in November 2024. Student accommodation expanded over the same period, and in 2019 the university reported that it had become the largest provider of student accommodation in New Zealand.

In 2021 Ngāti Whātua Ōrākei gifted the university its Māori name, Waipapa Taumata Rau, which replaced the earlier name Te Whare Wānanga o Tāmaki Makaurau.

=== 2025 faculty consolidation ===
After consultation in 2024, the university formed two amalgamated faculties with effect from 1 January 2025. The new Faculty of Arts and Education brought together the Faculties of Arts and of Education and Social Work, the Elam School of Fine Arts, the School of Music and the Dance Studies programme. The School of Architecture and Planning and the Design Programme joined the Faculty of Engineering, which was renamed the Faculty of Engineering and Design. The changes dissolved the Faculty of Creative Arts and Industries, whose units were divided between the two new faculties, and reduced the number of faculties from eight to six. The university presented the consolidation as a means of strengthening partnerships and transdisciplinary research, and of remaining a comprehensive institution as funding for the humanities, arts and social sciences deteriorated.

== Organisation and administration ==
=== Governance ===
The University of Auckland is governed by its Council, which comprises elected and appointed members and is chaired by the chancellor, a lay member of the Council. The chancellor, Cecilia Tarrant, was reappointed in 2025 as the Council's alumni representative and as chancellor.

Under section 280 of the Education and Training Act 2020, the Council appoints the chief executive (the vice-chancellor), carries out long-term planning, adopts the university's Investment Plan and determines institutional policy. Its membership comprises elected staff and student representatives, a member appointed to advise on Māori issues, a member appointed from the alumni, appointees providing specified skills, and ministerial appointees, together with the vice-chancellor ex officio.

The chief executive of the university is the vice-chancellor. Professor Nic Smith, an alumnus who was dean of engineering at the university from 2013 to 2020 and subsequently vice-chancellor of Victoria University of Wellington, took office on 3 August 2026 as the seventh vice-chancellor. His predecessor, Dawn Freshwater, the sixth vice-chancellor and the first woman to hold the office, announced her resignation in June 2025, six months into a renewed five-year term, and left the university on 10 April 2026. Professor Frank Bloomfield, Deputy Vice-Chancellor Research and Innovation, served as acting vice-chancellor in the interim.

The vice-chancellor chairs the University Executive Committee, which comprises the deputy vice-chancellors for Education, Research and Innovation, Strategic Engagement, Operations and Registrar, and Corporate Services; the Chief Financial Officer; the pro vice-chancellors Māori and Pacific; the director of human resources; and the deans of the six faculties. Academic matters are the responsibility of the Senate, the academic committee that the university is required to establish under clause 18(2) of Schedule 11 of the Act. The Senate is chaired by the vice-chancellor, and the Council is bound to consult it on academic matters.

==== Academic freedom and freedom of expression ====
The Education and Training Act 2020 gives statutory protection to the institutional autonomy of the university and to the academic freedom of its staff and students, and section 281A sets out the university's role in protecting and promoting freedom of expression and academic freedom. In late 2025, as now required by law, the University Council adopted a Freedom of Expression statement applying to all staff and students. The statement commits the university to fostering lawful and constructive debate, including with external speakers invited by staff members or by recognised student associations and clubs, while permitting the university to regulate the time, place and manner of expression so that its ordinary activities are not unduly disrupted. It also adopts a position of institutional neutrality: the university does not take public positions on matters that do not directly concern its roles, functions or duties, although official spokespeople may comment on matters such as the well-being and safety of staff and students, financial and resource management, sustainability, equity, and obligations relating to Te Tiriti o Waitangi.

==== List of chancellors ====
Since 1957, when Auckland University College became the University of Auckland, the university has had 13 chancellors. Previously, the college council had been headed by a president (from 1923), or a chairman (1883–1923).

	Name	Portrait	Term
Chairman
1	Maurice O'Rorke		1883–1916
2	Thomson Leys		1916–1920
3	George Fowlds		1920–1923
President
1	George Fowlds		1923–1933
2	Kenneth Mackenzie		1933–1935
3	Tom Wells		1935–1937
4	Harold Mahon		1937–1938
5	William Cocker		1938–1957
Chancellor
1	William Cocker		1957–1961
2	Douglas Robb		1961–1968
3	Henry Cooper		1968–1974
4	Graham Speight		1975–1980
5	Lindo Ferguson		1981–1986
6	Mick Brown		1986–1991
7	Ian Barker		1991–1999
8	John Graham		1999–2004
9	Hugh Fletcher		2004–2008
10	Roger France		2008–2012
11	Ian Parton		2012–2016
12	Scott St John		2017–2021
13	Cecilia Tarrant		2021–present

=== Faculties and schools ===
Since 2025 the university has been organised into six faculties, each headed by a dean.

==== List of faculties and schools ====
- Faculty of Arts and Education
- Business School
- Faculty of Engineering and Design
- Faculty of Law (Auckland Law School)
- Faculty of Medical and Health Sciences
- Faculty of Science

In 2025, enrolments by faculty were: Arts and Education 7,523 EFTS; Business and Economics 6,885 EFTS; Engineering and Design 5,908 EFTS; Law 2,072 EFTS; Medical and Health Sciences 5,445 EFTS; and Science 9,418 EFTS, with a further 1,932 EFTS in other units, including the Liggins Institute, the Auckland Bioengineering Institute and foundation programmes.

=== Research institutes ===
The Liggins Institute and the Auckland Bioengineering Institute are large-scale research institutes that operate as academic units separate from the six faculties, each headed by a director. Other institutes, such as the Public Policy Institute, sit within faculties.

- Auckland Bioengineering Institute (ABI)
- Liggins Institute
- Public Policy Institute (PPI), within the Faculty of Arts and Education

=== Finances ===
For the year ended 31 December 2025 the university group reported total revenue of NZ$1.63 billion, of which NZ$1.60 billion was unrestricted, and total expenses of NZ$1.55 billion. The adjusted net operating surplus was NZ$46.5 million, an operating margin of 2.9 per cent, compared with 0.8 per cent in 2024 and a target of 1.2 per cent. Tuition fees contributed NZ$501 million, an increase of 16.0 per cent that reflected both higher enrolments and a 6.0 per cent rise in fee rates. Government grants totalled NZ$548 million, comprising NZ$453 million of Tertiary Education Commission funding and NZ$95 million from the Performance-Based Research Fund. Research revenue fell by NZ$31.7 million (12.1 per cent), as grants awarded during the pandemic peak of 2020 and 2021 concluded faster than new grants were made and government funding pools contracted.

Capital expenditure on property, plant and equipment and intangibles totalled NZ$173.3 million in 2025, including NZ$114.8 million on building projects. At 31 December 2025 the university held operating cash of NZ$263.2 million against external debt of NZ$143.6 million, most of it an interest-free loan from Crown Infrastructure Partners repayable in 2033, giving net cash of NZ$119.6 million. The university remained in the low-risk category of the Tertiary Education Commission's Financial Monitoring Framework.

The university received NZ$51.5 million in philanthropic funding in 2025 from 2,788 donors and 4,951 gifts, compared with 1,439 donors and 3,208 gifts in 2024; major research programmes, especially in health and medicine, again received the largest share. The University of Auckland Foundation held net assets of NZ$423.4 million at 31 December 2025, all of them restricted by donors.

=== Staff ===
The university employed 6,250 full-time-equivalent staff in 2025, comprising 2,454 academic and 3,796 professional staff. Staff turnover, measured as terminations per 100 permanent staff, rose from 8.3 in 2024 to 12.9 in 2025, against a target of 7.5. The university attributed the increase largely to redundancies at its subsidiary Auckland UniServices, which recorded 200 terminations, 30 per cent of the university-wide total; turnover was also high in Auckland International, University Management and the School of Graduate Studies, the last two of which were restructured during the year. Of the 668 staff whose contracts ended in 2025, 196 had been redeployed to other permanent roles in the university by the end of the year.

=== Auckland University Press ===
Auckland University Press is a publisher established in 1966, owned and operated by the University of Auckland.

=== Coat of arms ===
The university's arms were granted by letters patent on 15 February 1962 and are recorded in the College of Arms, London.

Coat of arms of the University of Auckland
Granted 15 February 1962; 64 years ago Escutcheon The shield is azure (blue), charged with three argent (silver) mullets (five-pointed stars), between which is an open book 'proper', i.e. in its natural colours. The edge of the book and the binding are gold ('Or'), and the book is bound with seven gold clasps on either side. The chief (the broad strip at the top of the shield) is wavy, its lower edge forming a wave-like line; it is argent and bears three kiwis 'proper', shown in their natural colours. Motto Ingenio et Labore. (Latin); By natural ability and hard work Symbolism The open book, together with the motto Ingenio et Labore, freely translated as 'by natural ability and hard work', reflects the aim of the institution and, combined with the three stars, expresses the idea of learning pursued under the Southern Hemisphere sky. The kiwis signify New Zealand, to which the bird is confined, and the silver wavy chief on which they are set alludes to Auckland's coastal situation.

== Strategic initiatives ==
=== Innovation and entrepreneurship ===
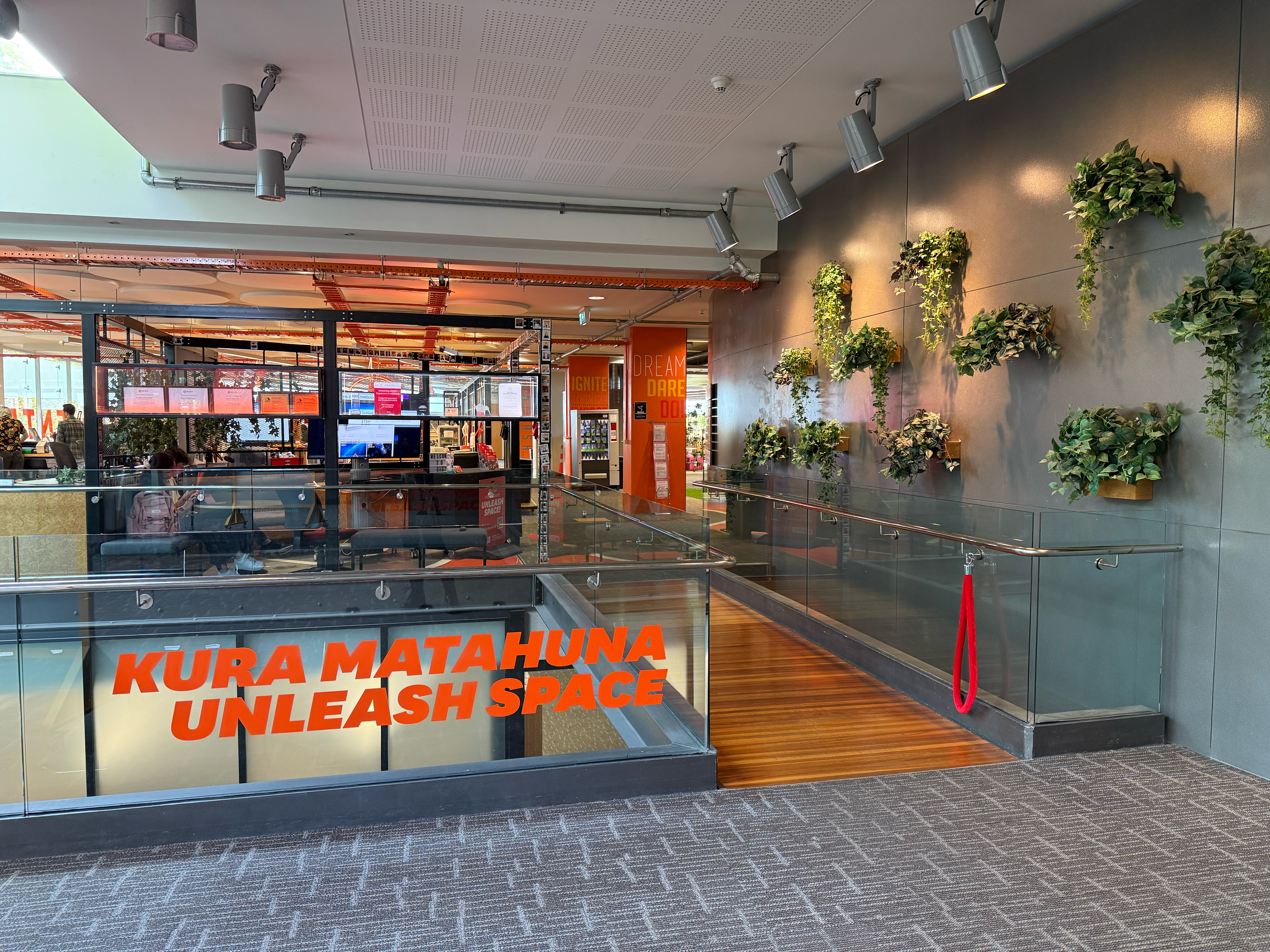
The Unleash Space, located in the University of Auckland Engineering Building

In 2018, the university opened the Unleash Space (Māori: Kura Matahuna), a co-working area for entrepreneurially minded students and staff that includes a maker space for designing and building prototypes.

The university ranked first in the 2023 Survey of Commercialisation Outcomes from Public Research (SCOPR) for the number of active start-up and spin-out companies, with 47 recorded. In the 2024 SCOPR results, published in 2025, the university and UniServices were ranked in the top five in Australasia for the number of active start-up companies, invention disclosures and new start-up companies. In 2025 the university was named Innovation and Entrepreneurial University of the Year at the Triple E Awards in Prague, and the vice-chancellor joined the mayoral-led Auckland Innovation and Technology Alliance.

The university's innovation and entrepreneurship initiatives include:

- The Centre for Innovation and Entrepreneurship (CIE), an academic unit that provides free co-curricular learning opportunities for students and staff. As of 2025 its director was Darsel Keane and its academic director Rod McNaughton. Since its founding in 2003 the centre has supported more than two hundred ventures and thousands of individuals, including the founders of Kami, Zenno Astronautics, Tectonus, Auror, Halter, Kitea Health, Hectre, Alimetry and Spalk.
- The Newmarket Innovation Precinct, a co-working space and research and development community for deep-technology start-ups and businesses, based in the Faculty of Engineering and Design. By 2025 almost 40 start-up and high-growth companies were co-located there.
- UniServices, a wholly owned subsidiary responsible for commercialising the university's research. It manages the University of Auckland Inventors' Fund, a start-up investment portfolio valued at NZ$47.9 million at the end of 2025, and runs Momentum, a student-led investment committee programme, and Return on Science, a national research commercialisation programme. UniServices launched seven new companies in 2025, and 14 companies in its portfolio raised third-party capital during the year.
- MedTech-iQ Aotearoa, New Zealand's national innovation hub for medical technology, hosted by the Auckland Bioengineering Institute.
- The New Zealand Product Accelerator (NZPA), a government-funded network of researchers and industry partners based at the university's Newmarket Campus. NZPA manages the National Testing Register, a catalogue of more than 700 items of testing equipment and facilities available for commercial use.
- The Aotearoa Centre for Enterprising Women, a research centre that supports women in entrepreneurship through research and outreach. It was launched with philanthropic funding from the businesswoman Theresa Gattung.

=== International engagement ===
At the start of 2025 the university was appointed chair of the United Nations Academic Impact Hub on Sustainable Development Goal 8, and later that year it acted as a regional host of the Times Higher Education Global Sustainable Development Congress in Istanbul. In June 2025 it launched Ala o le Moana, its first Pacific Strategy, covering 2025–2030 and led by the Pro Vice-Chancellor Pacific, Professor Jemaima Tiatia-Siau.

== Campuses and facilities ==
=== Campuses ===
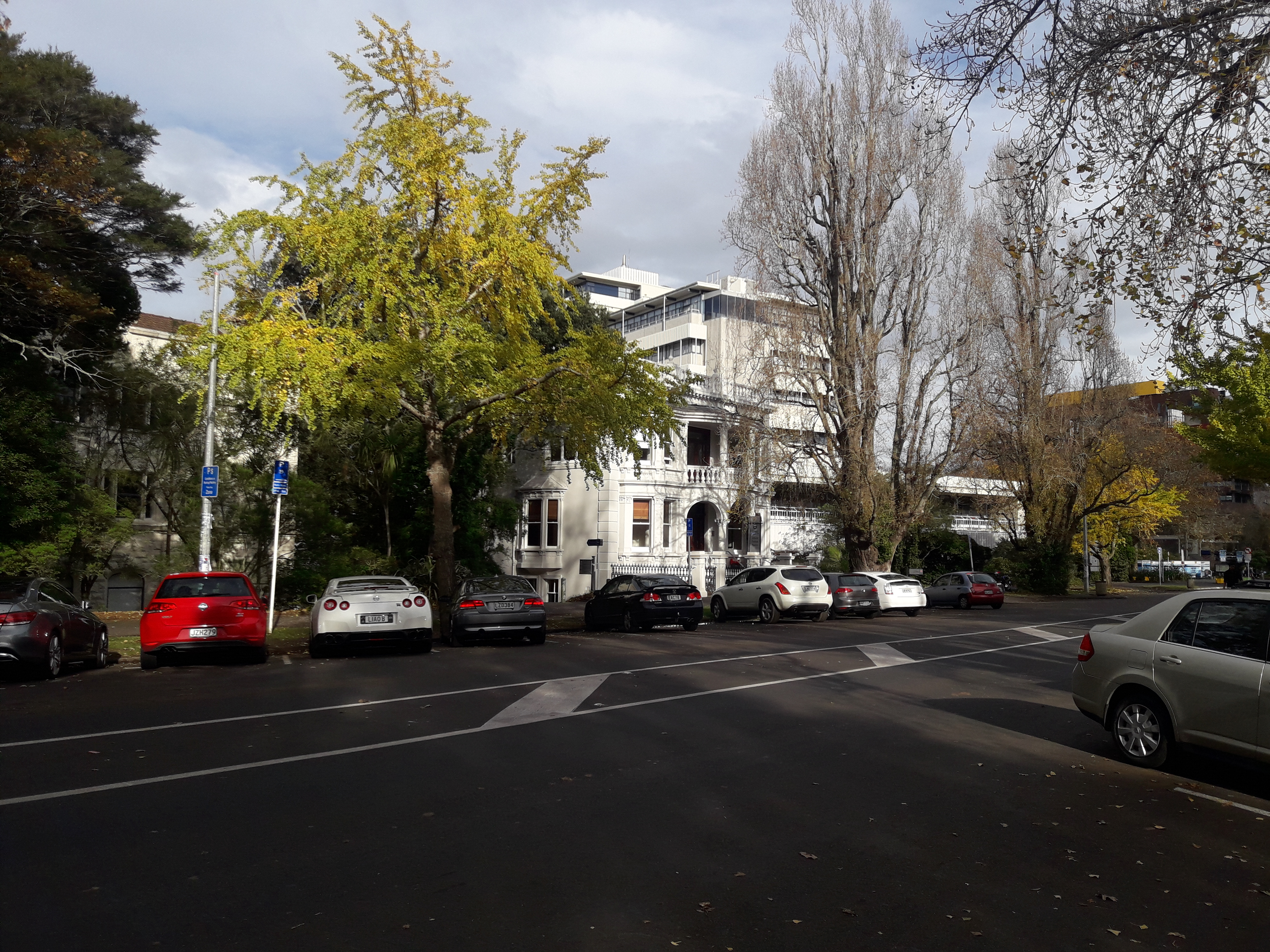
Alfred Nathan House (Building 103) was built in 1882 and acquired by the University of Auckland in 1958.

The University of Auckland has several campuses in Auckland and one in Whangārei in the Northland Region. Since the start of the 2010 academic year, smoking has been prohibited on all university property.

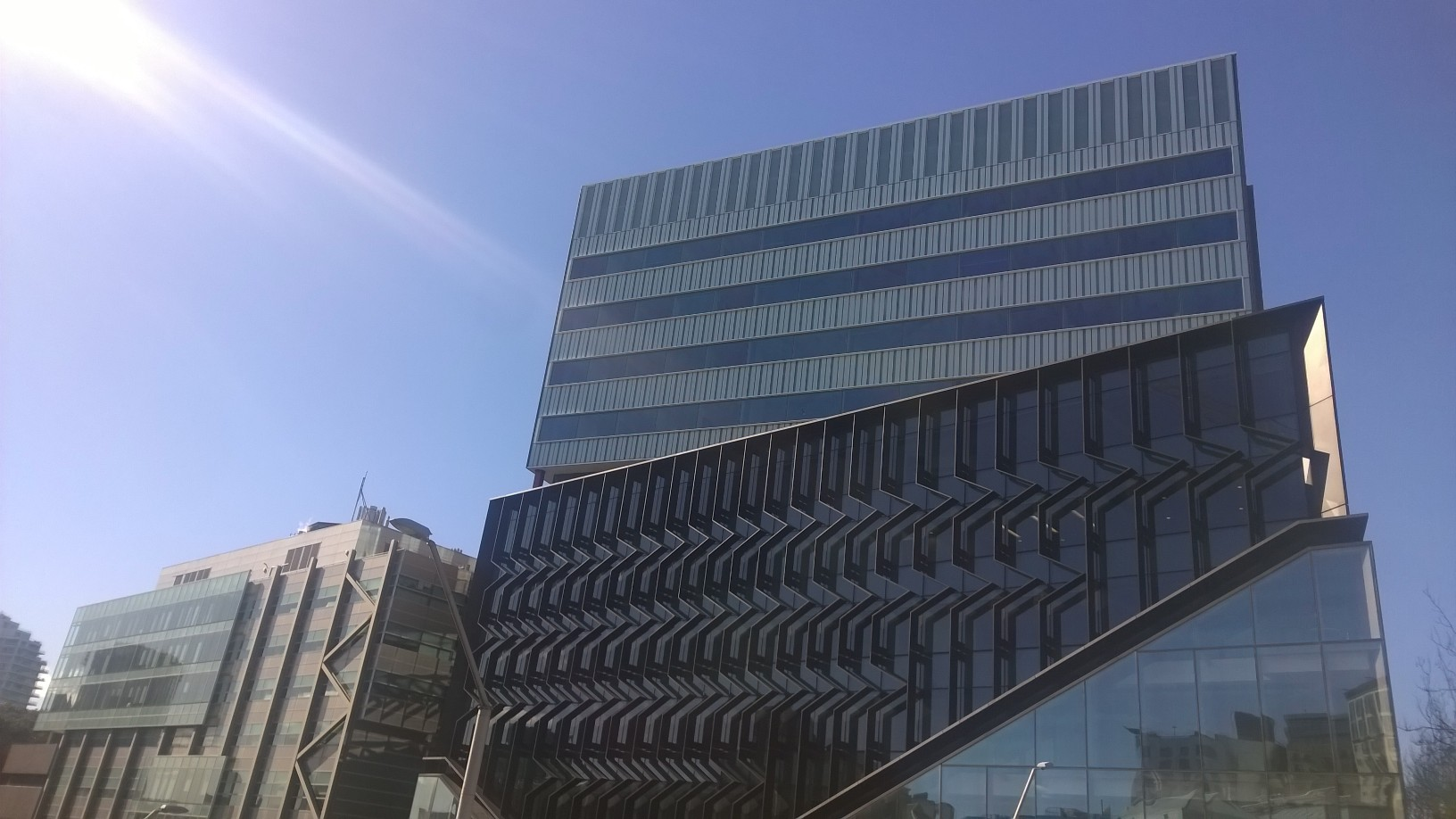
Buildings 303 (left) and 302 (right) of the Science Centre at the City Campus of the University of Auckland

==== City Campus ====
The City Campus in the Auckland CBD accommodates the majority of students and faculties. It covers 16 hectares and includes cafés, health services, libraries, childcare facilities and a recreation centre. Old Choral Hall, the venue of the college's opening ceremony in 1883, reopened in December 2025 after seismic strengthening and refurbishment and was officially opened by the Minister for Arts, Culture and Heritage, Paul Goldsmith. He Āhuru Mōwai, a cultural support centre for Māori students, opened in March 2025. In 2024 the university announced plans for a new Performing Arts Centre and Law Faculty building, and in 2026 it completed a restoration of the ClockTower to mark the building's centenary.

==== Grafton Campus ====
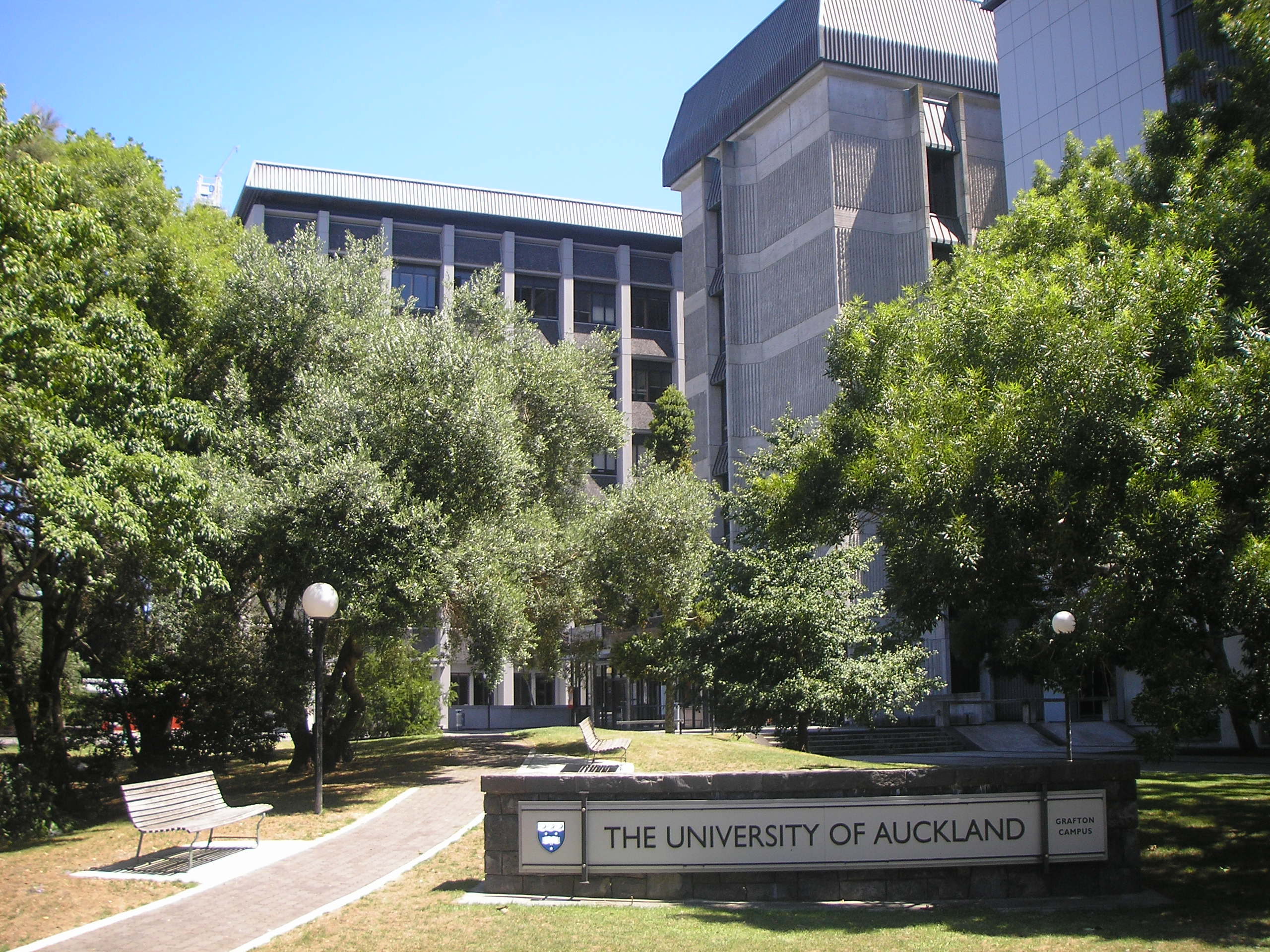
Part of the Medical School buildings at Grafton

The Grafton Campus, where teaching began in the new Medical School in 1968, is opposite Auckland City Hospital in the suburb of Grafton, close to the City Campus. It houses the Faculty of Medical and Health Sciences and the university's Eye Clinic.

==== Newmarket Campus ====
The Newmarket Campus occupies a 5.2-hectare site formerly owned and occupied by Lion Breweries, which the university bought in 2013. It opened in May 2015, and its facilities include an engineering research space and a large civil structures hall. The campus forms part of the Newmarket Innovation Precinct, where almost 40 start-up and high-growth companies were co-located by 2025.

==== Other campuses and facilities ====
- The Tai Tokerau Campus in Whangārei offers teacher education to the Northland community.
- The Faculty of Medical and Health Sciences has several satellite campuses and research facilities, including the Waitematā Health Campus (serving North Shore Hospital and Waitakere Hospital), the Freemasons' Department of Geriatric Medicine at North Shore Hospital, the South Auckland Clinical Campus at Middlemore Hospital, and the Waikato Clinical School.
- The Leigh Marine Laboratory, established in 1964, serves as the university's marine campus and hosts postgraduate teaching and research beside the Cape Rodney-Okakari Point Marine Reserve (Goat Island), about 100 km north of Auckland. The Dr Anneliese Schuler Aquaria Laboratory opened there in January 2025, the year in which the adjacent marine reserve marked its fiftieth anniversary.
- The South Auckland Campus, Te Papa Ako o Tai Tonga, opened in Manukau in February 2020, replacing the Faculty of Education courses previously offered at the Manukau Institute of Technology.
- The Goldie Estate Wine Science Centre on Waiheke Island occupies a 14-hectare vineyard gifted to the university by Kim and Jeanette Goldwater in 2011, and is used for teaching wine science.

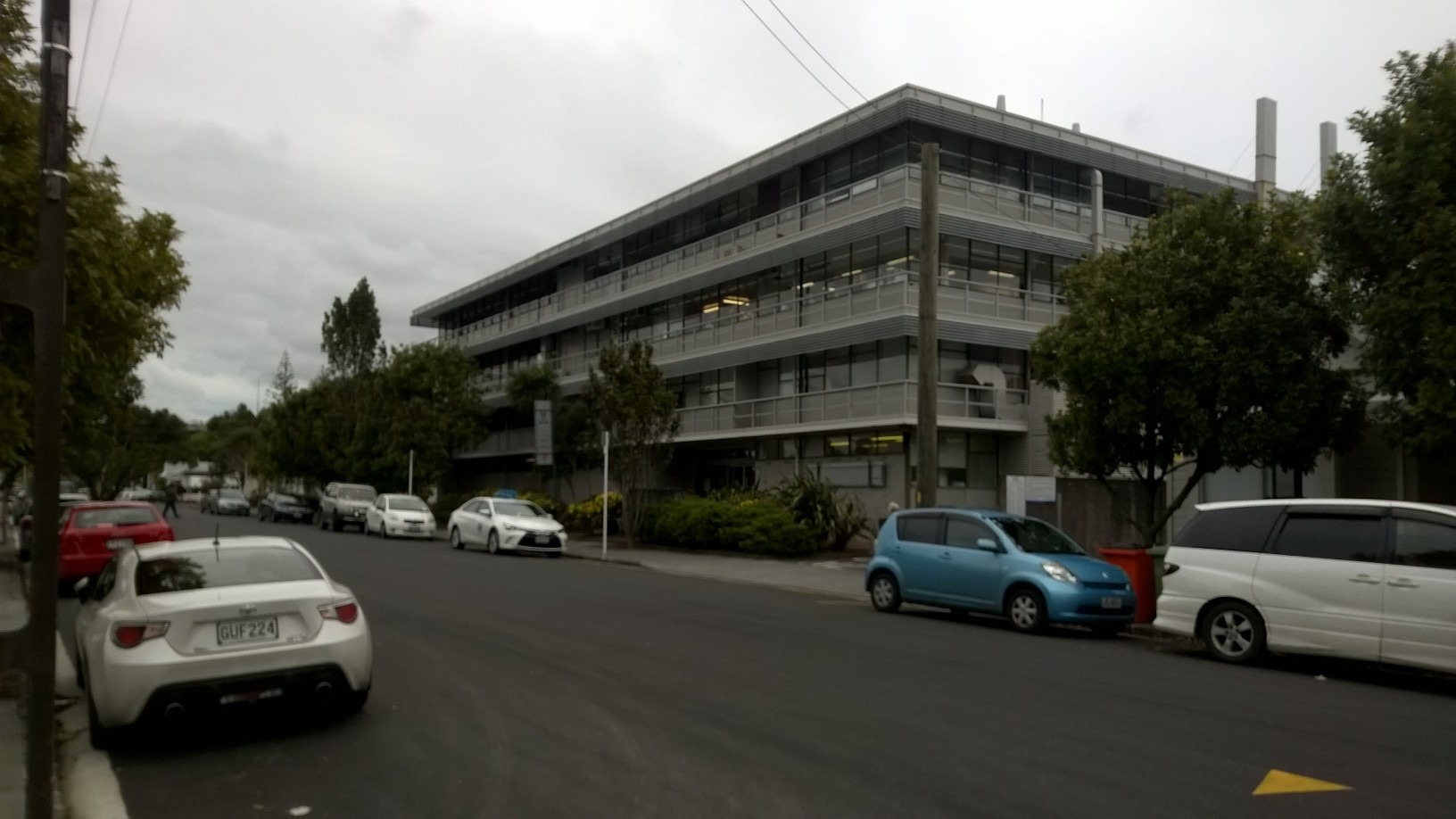
Building 529 (Old Liggins Building) of the University of Auckland Grafton Campus

==== Former campuses ====
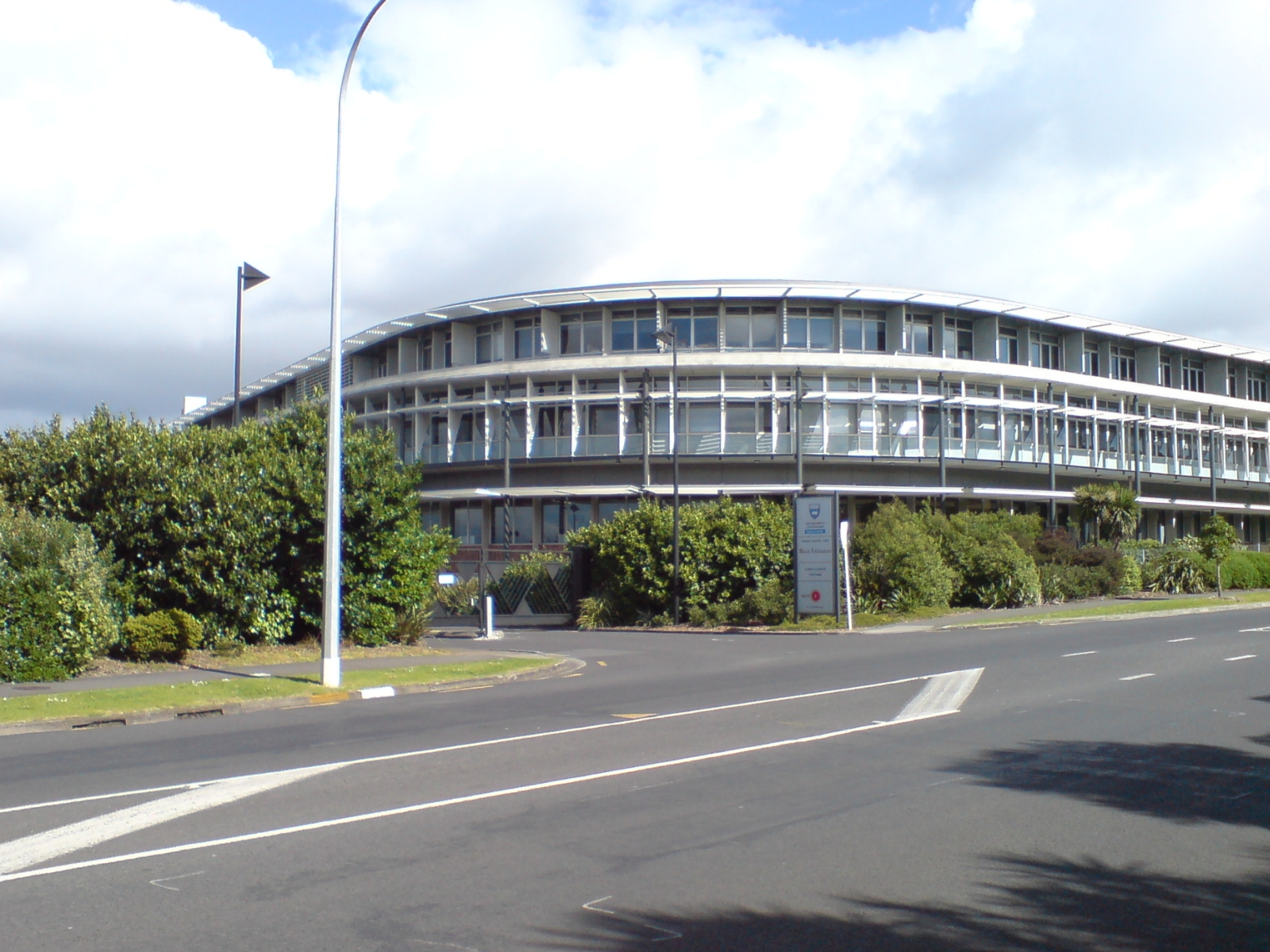
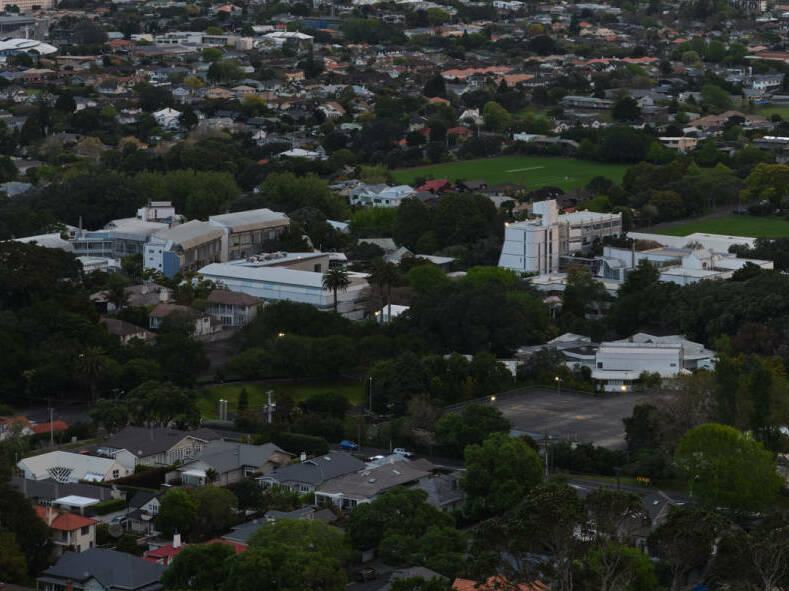
The School of Population Health building on the Tāmaki Campus and the former Epsom Campus.

The Tāmaki Innovation Campus was in the east Auckland suburb of St Johns, on a site the university began developing in the 1990s from buildings used for the 1990 Commonwealth Games village. It was a predominantly postgraduate campus focused on health innovation and on biodiversity and biosecurity. The university transferred Colin Maiden Park to Auckland Council in 2014, sold the remainder of the campus in 2016, and closed the campus in late 2019 after moving its activities to the City, Grafton and Newmarket campuses.

The Epsom Campus in Epsom had been the main campus of the Auckland College of Education and, after the 2004 merger, of the university's education faculty. The faculty's relocation to the City Campus, supported by government "shovel-ready" funding announced in 2020, centred on the rebuilt Building 201, which opened in September 2023; the faculty moved in readiness for teaching in 2024. The wharenui Tūtahi Tonu was moved from Epsom to the City Campus, where it forms part of Ngā Tauira, a second marae opened in 2024. The campus was vacated in 2024 and declared surplus to operational requirements, and a disposal process under the Public Works Act began, with a sale expected in late 2026. As of August 2026 the university was still working through the legal and government requirements for the sale, including Public Works Act obligations and rights of first refusal.

=== Overseas campuses and facilities ===
==== The University of Auckland Innovation Institute China (UOAIIC) ====
UOAIIC was established by the University of Auckland and UniServices, the university's commercialisation subsidiary, in the Chinese city of Hangzhou, with the aim of finding commercial opportunities for the university's research in China.

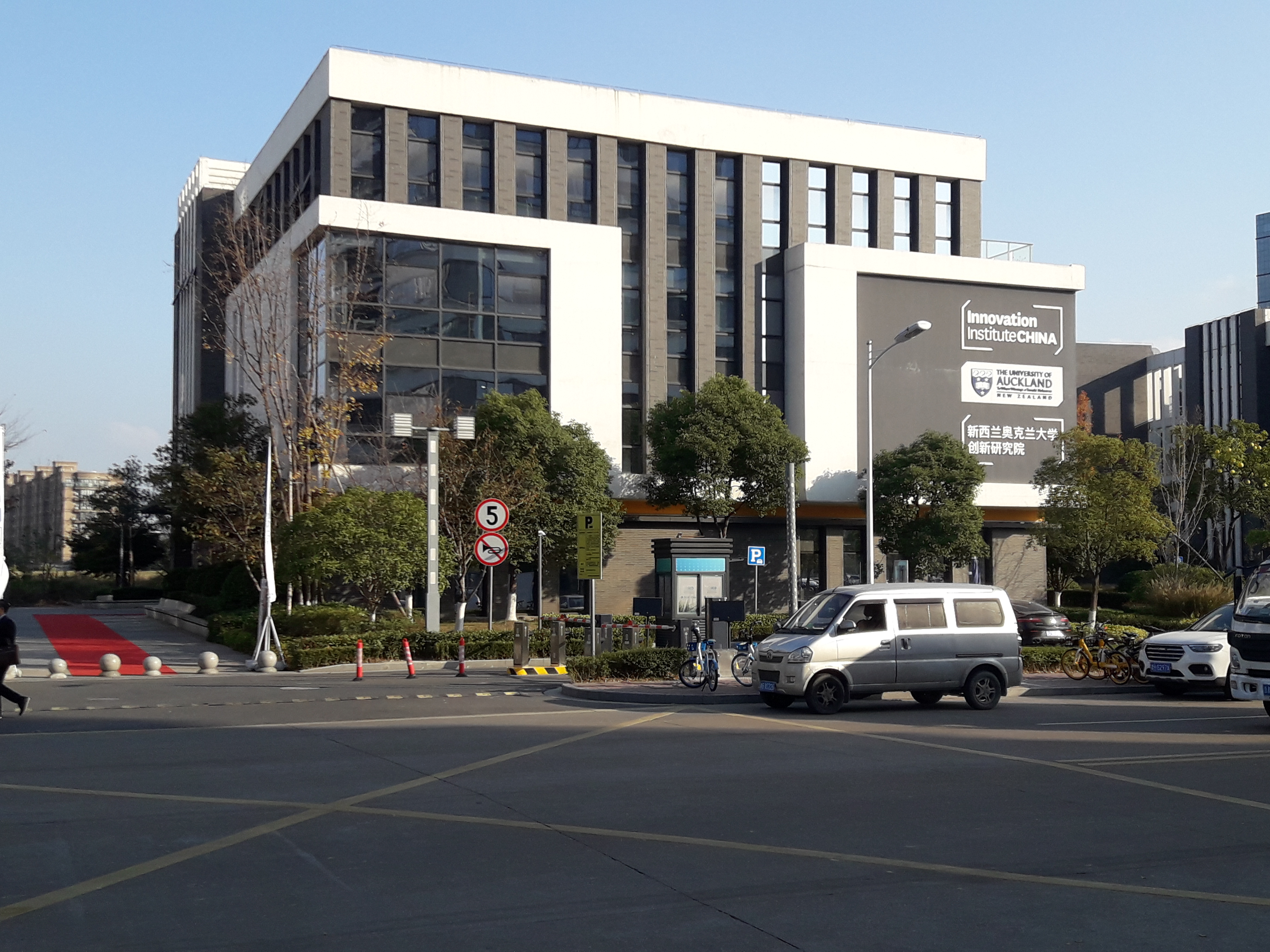
The University of Auckland Innovation Institute China (UOAIIC) in Hangzhou, China

==== Aulin College ====
Aulin College, in Harbin, China, is a joint institution of the University of Auckland and Northeast Forestry University (NEFU), approved by China's Ministry of Education in 2019. Its name combines the first syllable of "Auckland" with the first syllable of linye (林业), the Chinese word for forestry. The college took its first undergraduate intake in September 2019 and offers bachelor's and master's programmes in biotechnology, chemistry, and computer science and technology; students are taught in part by University of Auckland staff on NEFU's Harbin campus.

=== Libraries ===
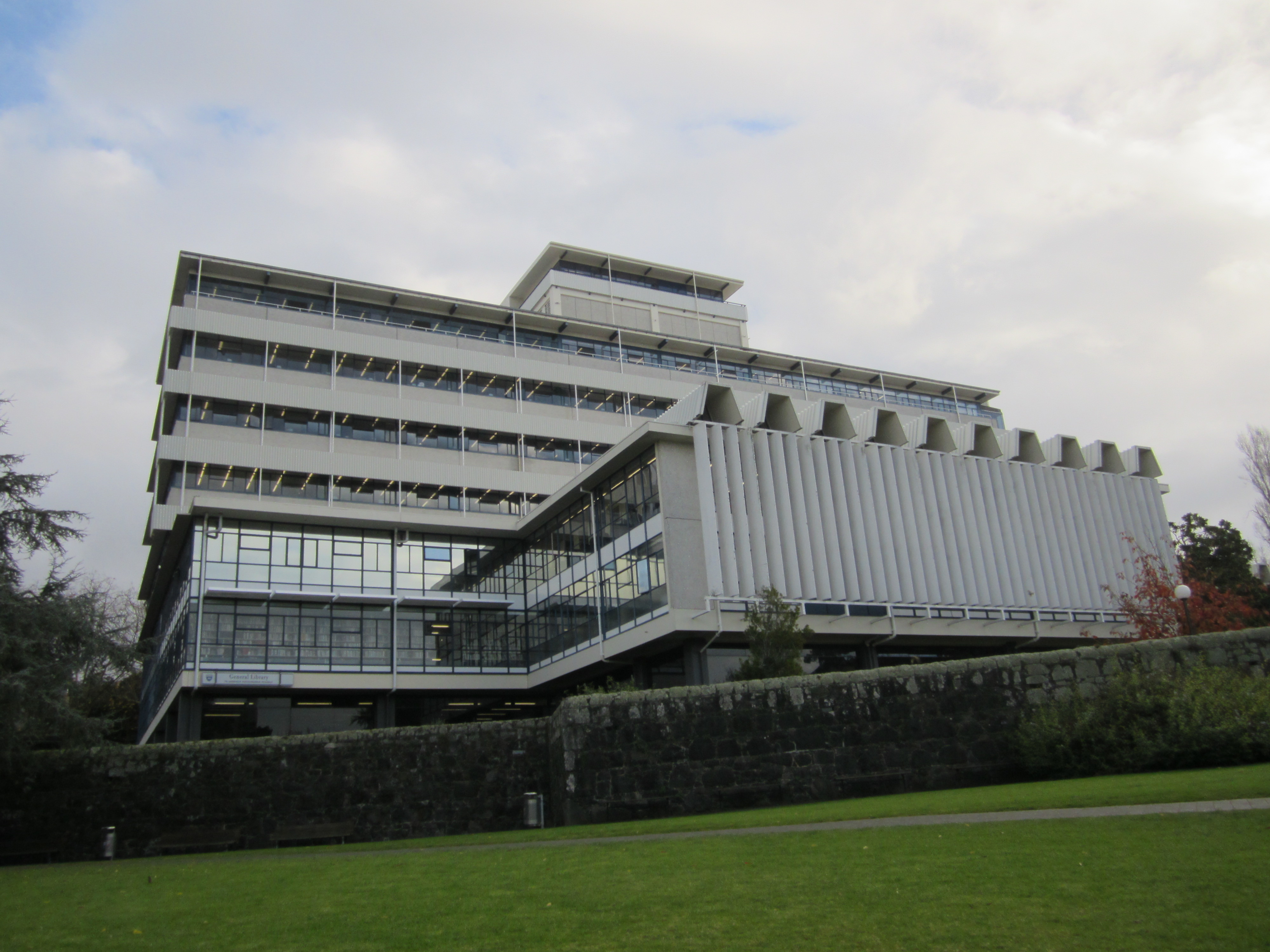
Albert Barracks wall remnant and the General Library on the City Campus (June 2012)

The University of Auckland's library system comprises the General Library and the Kate Edger Information Commons on the City Campus, the Davis Law Library, the Philson Library and Information Commons (Medical and Health Sciences) at Grafton, and the Sylvia Ashton-Warner Library at the Tai Tokerau Campus in Whangārei, with a Student Commons at the South Auckland Campus. In 2018 the university closed its specialist Fine Arts, Architecture and Planning, and Music and Dance libraries and consolidated their collections in the General Library (see Restructuring measures).

The General Library Special Collections hold rare books, manuscripts, archives and other material relating to the University of Auckland, New Zealand and the Pacific Islands. Notable manuscript collections include the Western Pacific Archives, which contain British colonial records relating to that region between 1877 and 1978; the papers of the poet Robin Hyde; and the archives of the New Zealand Electronic Poetry Centre, local Labour Party branches and the New Zealand Campaign for Nuclear Disarmament. Published collections include the Patterson Collection of books on biblical studies, classics and ancient history; children's author Betty Gilderdale's collection of New Zealand children's books; the Philson Library's pre-1900 medical books; and the Asian Language Collection, which contains 230 titles of rare Chinese books. Microtext holdings include the Māori Land Court Minute Books and the Pacific Manuscripts Bureau series.

=== Student accommodation ===
The university provides both catered and self-catered accommodation, in which several thousand students live. It ceased leasing Railway Campus in November 2008.

The four catered halls of residence, Grafton Hall, O'Rorke Hall, University Hall Towers and Waipārūrū Hall, are intended principally for first-year students. The university also runs nine self-catered residences, among them Te Tirohanga o te Tōangaroa, Carlaw Park Student Village, Grafton Student Flats, 55 Symonds, University Hall Apartments, Waikohanga House and Stuart McCutcheon House. These are located in or near the Auckland CBD. Waipārūrū Hall, with 786 places for first-year students, was completed in 2020, and Carlaw Park Student Village, which opened in 2014, was expanded by 907 beds in 2023 in partnership with Precinct Properties.

=== Hiwa Recreation Centre ===
The Hiwa Recreation Centre opened on the City Campus in November 2024. It replaced a recreation centre built in 1978, when the university had about 10,000 students. Built at a cost of NZ$320 million and partly funded by students, it was officially opened on 21 February 2025 by Vice-Chancellor Dawn Freshwater and the Minister for Infrastructure, Chris Bishop. The university reported almost a million visits in its first year of operation.

=== Art Collection ===
The University of Auckland Art Collection was established in 1966 by Keith Sinclair and Bob Chapman and is managed by the Centre for Art Research at the Gus Fisher Gallery. It is used as a resource for teaching, learning and research, and works are lent to departments and faculties on all campuses. The collection includes works by artists such as Frances Hodgkins, Colin McCahon, Billy Apple and Ralph Hotere.

== Academic profile ==
=== Admission ===
All universities in New Zealand require domestic students to achieve, at a minimum, NZQA University Entrance (UE) to be eligible to enrol. International students must hold an equivalent approved qualification from their home country or complete an approved foundation programme in New Zealand. International applicants whose first language is not English must provide evidence of English proficiency; for undergraduate admission the minimum is an IELTS (Academic) overall score of 6.0 with no band below 5.5, or an approved equivalent.

Each programme has a minimum rank score, calculated from the applicant's results in secondary school or an equivalent approved qualification. Some programmes also require prior completion of, or concurrent enrolment in, another programme.

=== Research ===
In 2025 the university reported 5,622 research publications, of which 70.4 per cent appeared in journals ranked in the top 20 per cent by quality, and 3,856 publications with at least one co-author based outside New Zealand, most commonly in China, the United States and Australia. A total of 292 University of Auckland researchers appeared in the Stanford/Elsevier list of the world's top two per cent of scientists for 2025, about a quarter of all New Zealand researchers on the list.

=== Academic reputation ===
University rankings

Global – Overall
- ARWU World: 201-300 (2026)
- CWTS World: 223 (Note: The CWTS Leiden Ranking is based on P (top 10%).) (2024)
- QS World: 67 (2027)
- THE World: 168 (2027)
- THE Reputation: 151–200 (2025)
- USNWR Global: =117 (26/27)

National – Overall
- ARWU National: 1 (2026)
- CWTS National: 1 (2024)
- QS National: 1 (2027)
- THE National: 1 (2027)

In the 2027 Quacquarelli Symonds World University Rankings, published in June 2026, the university was ranked 67th, the highest position among New Zealand universities.

In the Times Higher Education World University Rankings 2027, published in September 2026, the university was ranked 168th of a record 2,297 institutions, compared with 156th in the previous edition, and remained the highest-ranked university in New Zealand.

In the 2026 Academic Ranking of World Universities, the university was placed in the 201–300 band, the highest placing among New Zealand universities. The university has been placed in this band in every edition since 2017.

In the 2026–2027 U.S. News & World Report Best Global Universities, the university was ranked equal 117th.

In the CWTS Leiden Ranking 2024, the university was ranked 223rd (first nationally), and in the 2024 Aggregate Ranking of Top Universities, which combines the QS, THE and ARWU results, it was ranked 128th (first nationally).

The university's results in subject and sustainability rankings declined in 2025. The number of its subjects placed in the global top 50 fell from ten to five in the QS subject rankings and from two to one in the Global Ranking of Academic Subjects (GRAS), and it fell from 13th to 28th in the Times Higher Education Impact Rankings and from 17th to 28th in the QS Sustainability Rankings, in each case missing its internal targets. In the 2026 editions, eight of its subjects were placed in the QS global top 50 and two in the GRAS top 50, Food Science and Technology (31st) and Aerospace Engineering (50th).

== Student life ==
=== Students' association ===
The Auckland University Students' Association (AUSA), formed in 1891, is the representative body of students. AUSA publicises student issues, administers student facilities and supports affiliated clubs and societies. It publishes the student magazine Craccum and runs the radio station 95bFM.

=== Student demographics ===
In 2025 the university enrolled 49,901 students by headcount, of whom 28,121 were female, 21,290 male and 490 gender diverse; 38,142 had local residency and 11,759 overseas residency. Equivalent full-time enrolment grew by 7.1 per cent during the year. International students accounted for 9,156 EFTS, and the share of students with international residency rose from 21.0 per cent in 2024 to 23.4 per cent; they came from 119 countries and territories. A total of 12,438 degrees were completed in 2025.

Ethnicity of students (headcount)	2024	2023	2022	2021	2020	2019
Asian	24,026 (50.6%)	22,530 (48.9%)	21,796 (47.1%)	20,965 (45.5%)	19,611 (45.6%)	19,466 (45.1%)
European	13,699 (28.9%)	14,195 (30.8%)	14,906 (32.2%)	15,372 (33.4%)	14,308 (33.3%)	14,570 (33.8%)
Pasifika	3,984 (8.4%)	3,834 (8.3%)	4,043 (8.7%)	4,058 (8.8%)	3,714 (8.6%)	3,638 (8.4%)
Māori	3,228 (6.8%)	3,092 (6.7%)	3,285 (7.1%)	3,363 (7.3%)	3,073 (7.1%)	3,117 (7.2%)
Middle Eastern, Latin American, African (MELAA)	1,871 (3.9%)	1,761 (3.8%)	1,675 (3.6%)	1,689 (3.7%)	1,607 (3.7%)	1,579 (3.7%)
Other	635 (1.3%)	632 (1.4%)	584 (1.3%)	601 (1.3%)	687 (1.6%)	778 (1.8%)
Total	47,443	46,044	46,289	46,048	43,000	43,148

=== Alumni association ===
The university's alumni association is the University of Auckland Society.

== Controversies ==
=== Restructuring measures ===
In April 2016, Vice-Chancellor Stuart McCutcheon announced that the university would sell its Epsom and Tāmaki campuses in order to consolidate teaching and services at the City, Grafton and Newmarket campuses. The Epsom Campus was then the site of the education faculty, while the Tāmaki Campus housed parts of the medical and science faculties, including the School of Population Health.

In June 2018, following a review of Libraries and Learning Services, McCutcheon confirmed that the specialist Fine Arts, Architecture and Planning, and Music and Dance libraries would close and their collections be consolidated in the General Library. About 45 full-time-equivalent library positions were disestablished, and Newshub reported that the wider review cut more than 100 support-service jobs. McCutcheon said the changes would save between NZ$3 million and NZ$4 million a year. The decision was opposed by many staff and students, who argued that the closure of the Elam Fine Arts Library would make study materials harder to access; thousands signed a petition against the changes, and protests were held in April, May and June 2018.

=== Fossil fuel divestment campaign ===
In May 2017, fourteen members of the student group Fossil Free UoA occupied the Vice-Chancellor's wing of the ClockTower building to press Vice-Chancellor Stuart McCutcheon to support divestment of the university's foundations from fossil fuels; they were removed by police after more than twelve hours. Two days later more than two hundred students and staff marched in support of divestment, and more than 240 staff from eight faculties signed an open letter urging the Boards of the University of Auckland Foundation and the School of Medicine Foundation to divest. The University of Auckland Foundation's Responsible Investment Policy Statement now precludes investment in funds that invest in companies deriving any revenue from fossil fuel reserves.

=== Vice-chancellor's house ===
In early December 2020 the Office of the Auditor-General published an inquiry into the university's purchase of a NZ$5 million house in the Auckland suburb of Parnell for Vice-Chancellor Dawn Freshwater, finding that the university had not demonstrated a justifiable business purpose for the purchase. Student representatives had criticised the purchase. In October 2020, after the Auditor-General's inquiry had begun, Freshwater had recommended to the Chancellor and the Council that the university consider selling the house, citing the university's financial position and the impossibility of hosting functions under COVID-19 restrictions. The house was sold in 2021, with the proceeds applied to reducing university debt.

=== Siouxsie Wiles v University of Auckland ===
In January 2022 it was reported that Siouxsie Wiles and Shaun Hendy had filed claims with the Employment Relations Authority against the university, alleging that it had failed to protect them from harassment arising from their public commentary on COVID-19 and their advocacy of vaccination. Hendy settled his claim in October 2022 after leaving the university. Wiles's case was heard in the Employment Court over three weeks from early November 2023, after which Judge Holden reserved her decision. On 8 July 2024 the court ruled in Wiles's favour and ordered the university to pay her NZ$20,000 in damages, although it found that the university had not breached her academic freedom.

=== 2024 student accommodation rent strike ===
On 1 May 2024 a group of students living in university accommodation began a rent strike in protest at an 8 per cent increase in accommodation charges for the academic year.

=== 2024 course review ===
In August 2024 the university's leadership informed academics across the institution that a "course optimisation" exercise was under way, which would reduce the number of courses offered at undergraduate and postgraduate levels. The proposal met strong opposition from academic staff, and the Senate voted to pause the curriculum redesign from which the proposed changes had arisen. Students and members of the Tertiary Education Union also formed a group to oppose the changes.

=== Staff disputes ===
In 2007 the Association of University Staff of New Zealand (AUS) stated that New Zealand universities had become more litigious in managing staff, and that the University of Auckland had paid more than NZ$780,000 in 2006 to settle personal grievances and other disputes. In one case, the international relations lecturer Paul Buchanan was dismissed in 2007 following a student's complaint about an email he had sent her concerning her performance in his course. He was formally reinstated in 2008 but did not return to lecturing, and in 2010 he accepted the formal reinstatement and a payment in settlement of his appeal to the Employment Court.

== Notable people ==
=== Notable alumni ===
==== Alumni recognition programmes ====
The university recognises graduates through its annual Distinguished Alumni Awards. The 2025 Taumata Distinguished Alumni Award recipients were the property developer Peter Cooper, Beca chief executive Amelia Linzey, Auckland City Missioner Helen Robinson and the producer Stephen Stehlin, with Craig Piggott named young alumnus. The university also runs a biennial "40 Under 40" programme, which recognises forty alumni aged forty or under for leadership, innovation and service.

==== Academia ====
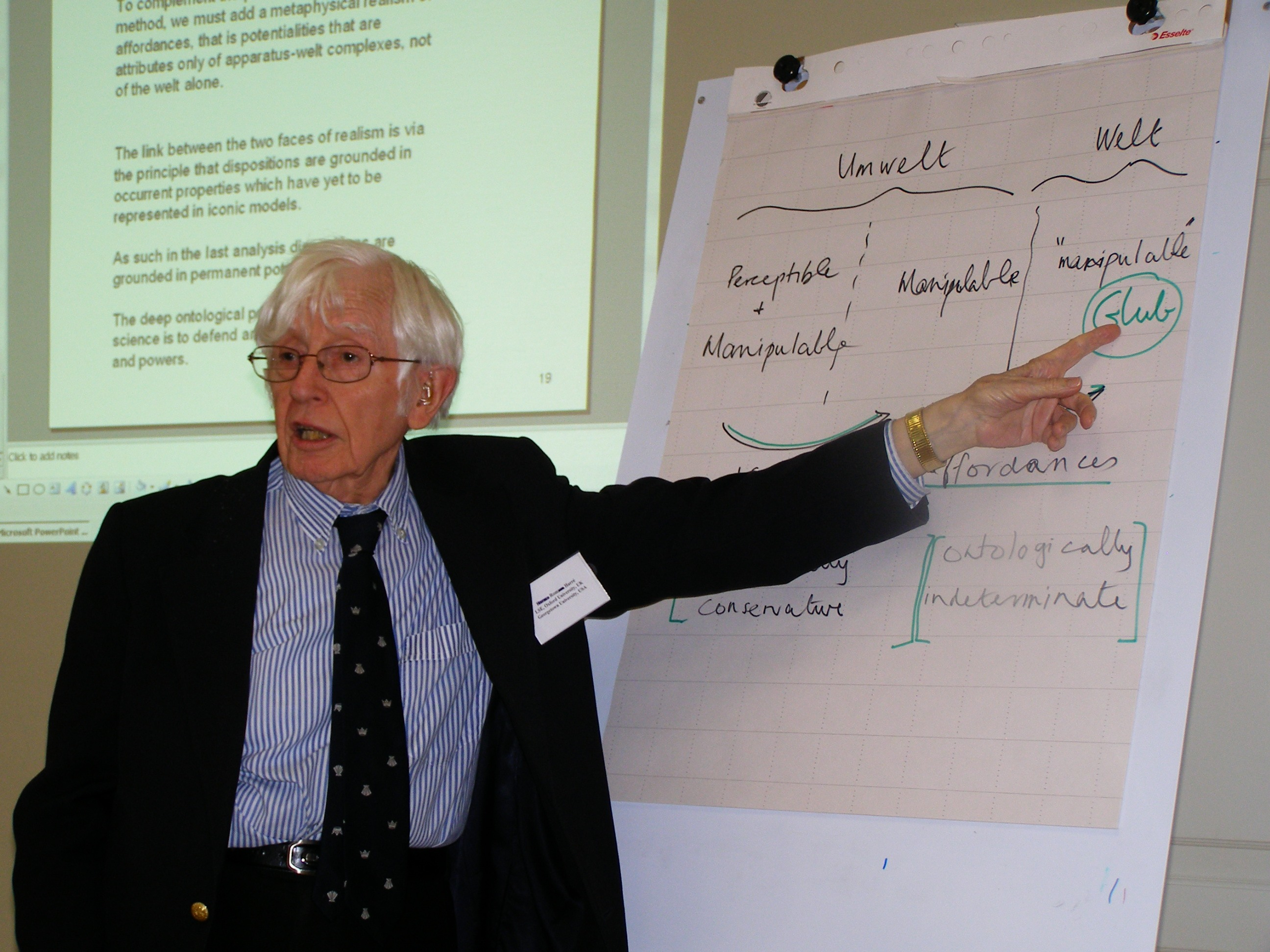
Rom Harré

- Alexandra Brewis Slade, anthropologist
- Margaret Brimble, organic chemist
- Dianne Brunton, ecologist, professor at Massey University
- Jemma Field, historian
- Colleen M. Flood, legal scholar and Fellow of the Royal Society of Canada
- Rom Harré, philosopher
- Harry Hawthorn, Canadian anthropologist
- John Hood, former vice-chancellor of the University of Oxford
- Susan Kemp, social work academic
- Charlotte Macdonald, historian
- Diane M. Mackie, social psychologist
- Constant Mews, historian of medieval religious thought
- Susan Moller Okin, philosopher
- Janis Paterson, developmental psychologist and founding director of the Pacific Islands Families Study
- Peter C. B. Phillips, econometrician
- Elizabeth Rata, professor of education
- Papaarangi Mary-Jane Reid, public health academic
- Graham Smith, Māori education academic
- Terry Sturm, professor of English
- Rory Sweetman, historian
- Ronald Syme, classicist
- Tarisi Vunidilo, Fijian archaeologist and curator
- Rorden Wilkinson, political economist
- David Wills, translator of Jacques Derrida

==== Art ====
- Louie Bretaña, artist
- Vidyamala Burch, writer and mindfulness teacher
- Saraid de Silva, writer
- Luise Fong, artist and educator
- Gill Gatfield, sculptor
- Ian George, artist
- Diya Joukani, fashion designer and influencer
- Bob Kerr, artist and author
- Rachael McKenna, photographer
- Reuben Paterson, artist
- Cheryll Sotheran, founding chief executive of the Museum of New Zealand Te Papa Tongarewa
- Mary Woodward, 1949 Miss New Zealand, writer and activist
- Benjamin Work, artist

==== Business ====
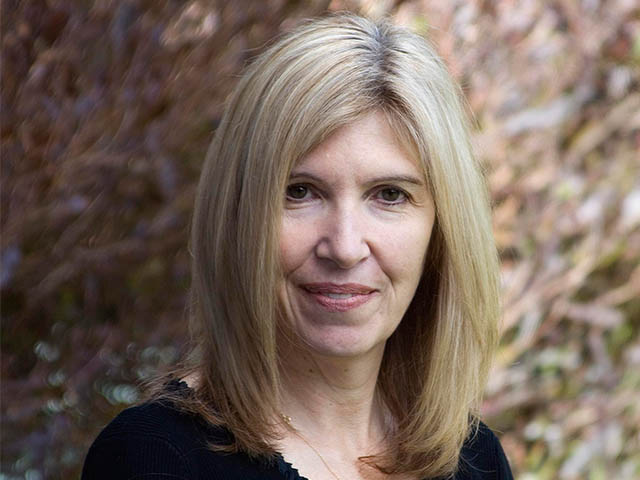
Jane Taylor

- Vincent Cheng, banker
- Shayne Elliott, banker
- Paul Huljich, businessman and author
- Ross Keenan, businessman
- Jane Taylor, lawyer and company director

==== Film and television ====
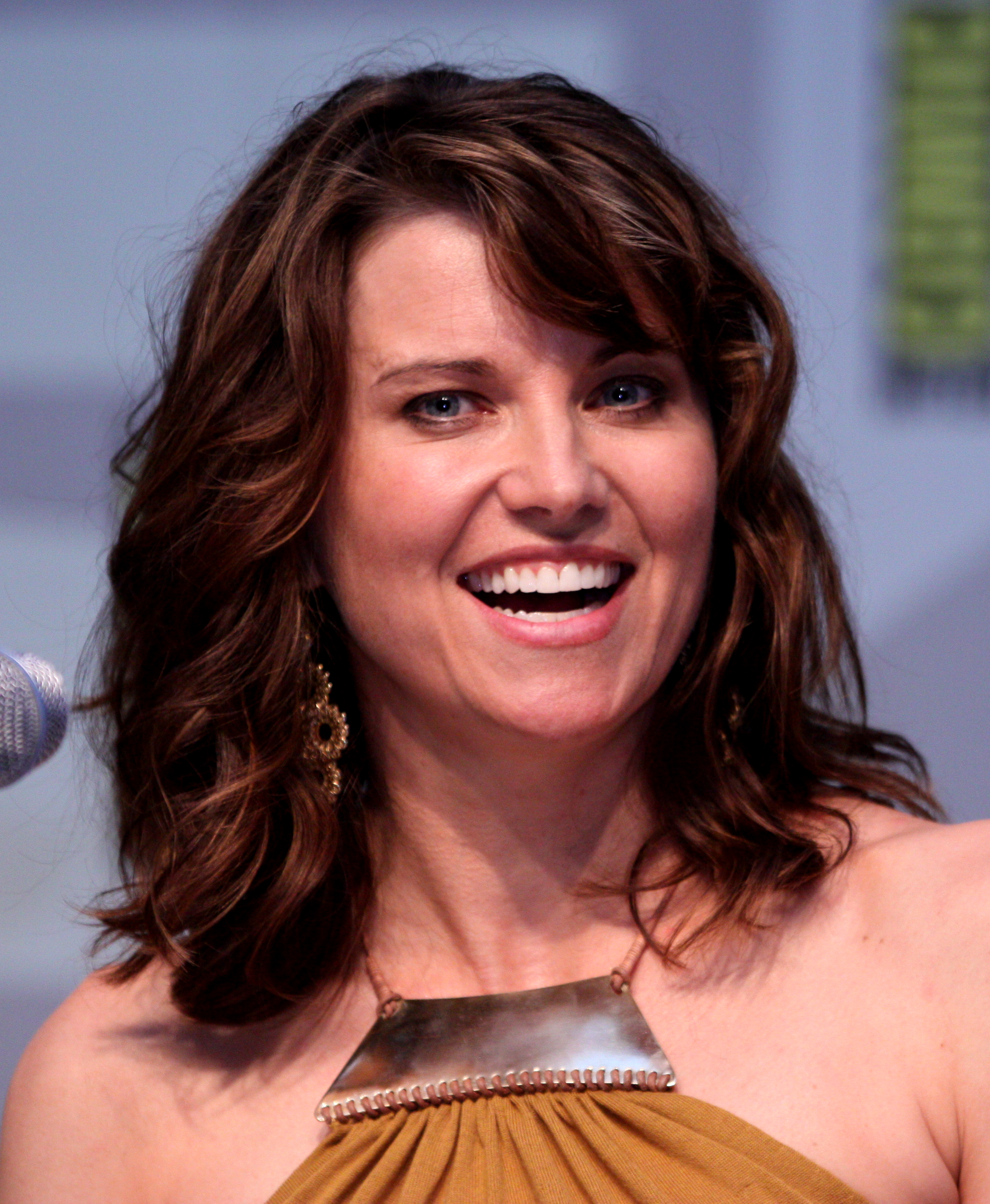
Lucy Lawless

- Philippa Boyens, Academy Award-winning screenwriter
- Niki Caro, film director, producer and screenwriter
- Jacqueline Feather, screenwriter
- Lucy Lawless, actress
- Karl Rock, YouTuber
- Yasmine Ryan (c. 1983–2017), journalist
- Antony Starr, actor
- Christine Tan, CNBC news anchor

==== Music ====
- Marcus Chang, Taiwanese singer-songwriter and actor
- Gary Chaw, singer-songwriter
- Gareth Farr, composer
- Tim Finn, musician
- Jeffrey Grice, pianist
- David Griffiths, composer, singer and lecturer
- Anthony Jennings, harpsichordist, organist and choral and orchestral director
- Ashley Lawrence, conductor
- Marya Martin, flautist
- Douglas Mews, early music specialist
- Shirley Setia, singer and actress
- Wilma Smith, Fijian-born concert violinist and music teacher
- Derek Williams, composer, arranger, conductor and lecturer

==== Politics and law ====
New Zealand prime ministers who attended the University of Auckland

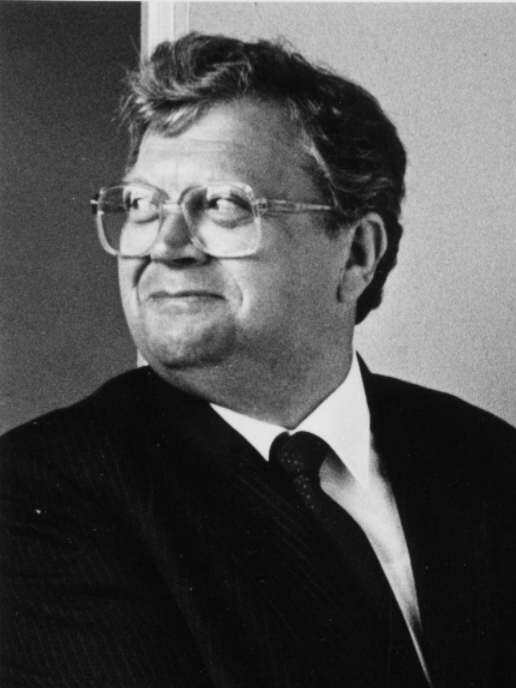
David Lange

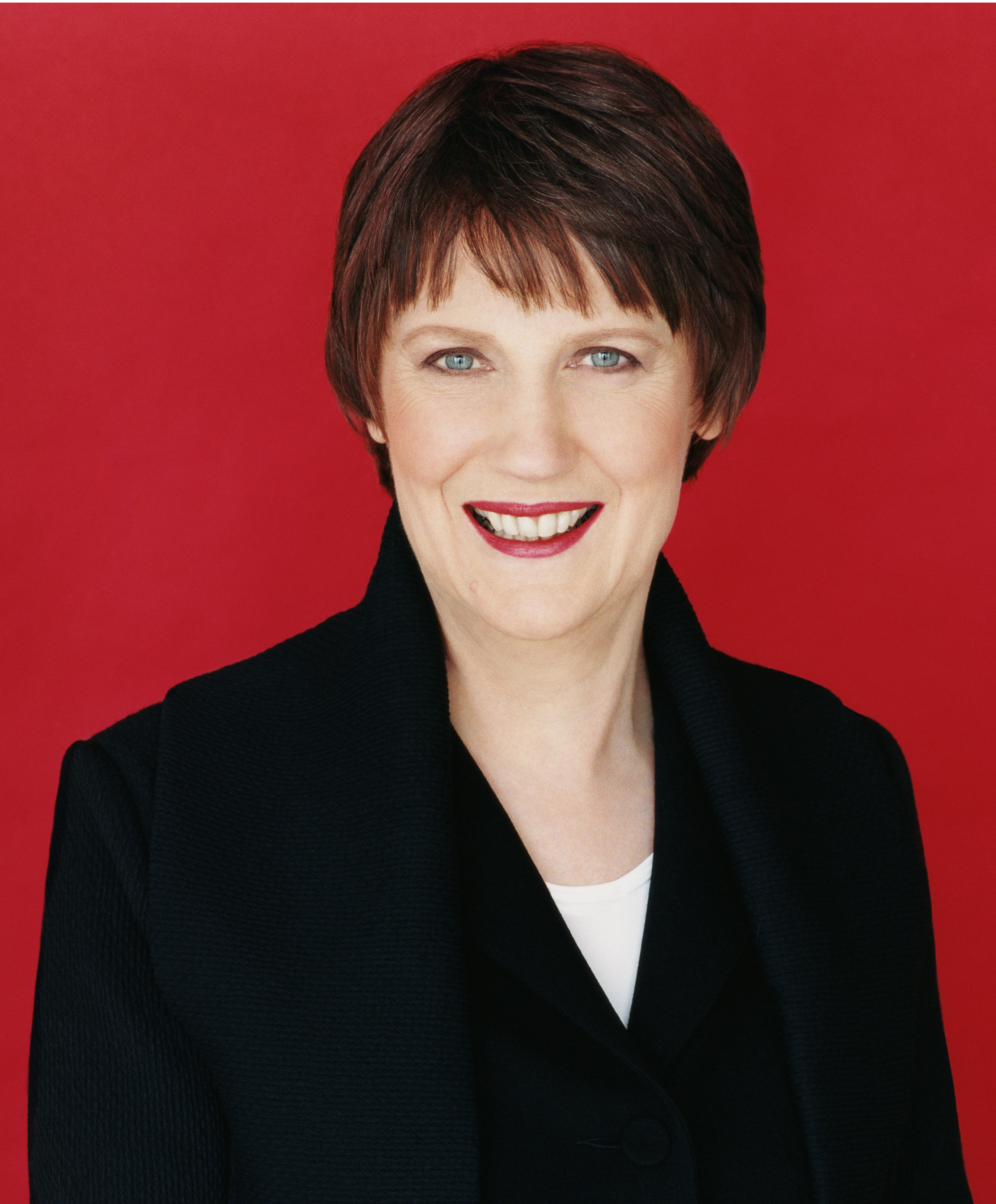
Helen Clark

- Jan Beagle, former under-secretary-general of the United Nations
- Simon Bridges, former leader of the New Zealand National Party and leader of the opposition
- Helen Clark, former prime minister of New Zealand and former administrator of the United Nations Development Programme
- Colin Craig, businessman and founder of the Conservative Party of New Zealand
- Jennifer Curtin, political scientist
- Carlos Cheung, New Zealand politician
- Sian Elias, Chief Justice of New Zealand 1999–2019
- Jeanette Fitzsimons, politician and environmentalist
- Lowell Goddard, judge
- Jonathan Hunt, former Speaker of the House of Representatives, member of the Order of New Zealand
- Kenneth Keith, former judge of the International Court of Justice
- David Lange, former prime minister of New Zealand
- Viliami Latu, Tongan politician
- Tuilaepa Aiono Sailele Malielegaoi, former prime minister of Samoa
- Mahesh Muralidhar, New Zealand politician
- Leslie Munro, former permanent representative of New Zealand to the United Nations and former president of the United Nations General Assembly
- Shai Navot, former leader of The Opportunities Party
- Winston Peters, politician and leader of New Zealand First
- Anthony Randerson, former Chief High Court Judge and judge of the Court of Appeal
- Mike Rann, former premier of South Australia and former Australian high commissioner to the United Kingdom
- Anand Satyanand, Governor-General of New Zealand 2006–2011
- Peter Thomson, Fijian diplomat and former president of the United Nations General Assembly
- Taufa Vakatale, former deputy prime minister of Fiji
- Vangelis Vitalis, diplomat
- Helen Winkelmann, Chief Justice of New Zealand since 2019
- Michael Wood, New Zealand politician

==== Science and technology ====
- Penelope Brothers, chemist
- Howard Carmichael, physicist
- Helen Danesh-Meyer, ophthalmologist
- Sir Richard Faull, neuroscientist
- Lynnette Ferguson
- Crispin Gardiner, physicist
- Ross Ihaka, statistician
- Sir Vaughan Jones, Fields medallist
- Sir Harold Marshall, acoustician and architect
- Stephen Parke, physicist
- Richard John Pentreath, British marine scientist
- William Sage Rapson, chemist
- Daniel Frank Walls, physicist
- Jennifer Mary Weller, anaesthesiologist
- Anne Wyllie, microbial disease epidemiologist

==== Sports ====
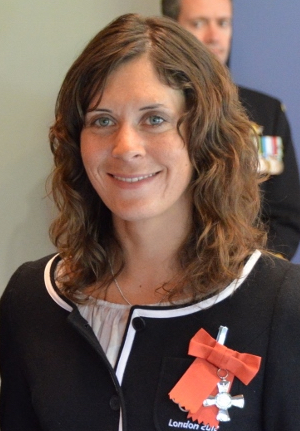
Jo Aleh

- Jo Aleh, sailor and Olympic champion
- Russell Coutts, yachtsman
- Richard de Groen, Test cricketer and Olympic and Commonwealth Games administrator
- Mahé Drysdale, rower and mayor of Tauranga since 2024
- Michael Jones, rugby player and coach
- Jerome Kaino, rugby player
- Eliza McCartney, Olympic pole vaulter
- Jean Spencer, Olympic gymnast

=== Notable faculty ===
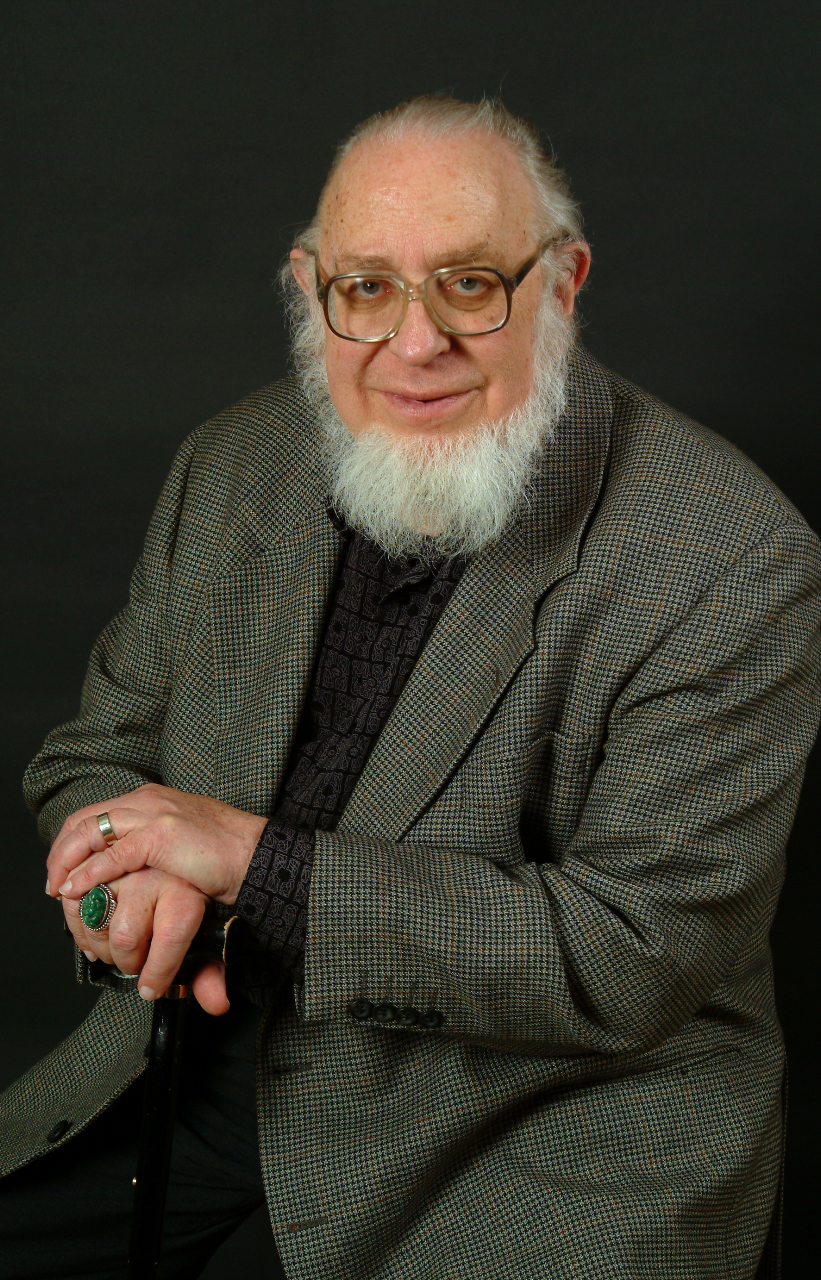
Portrait of Professor Roger Curtis Green from the Department of Anthropology

The economist A. W. H. (Bill) Phillips, known for the Phillips curve, held a post at the University of Auckland after leaving the Australian National University, and died in 1975. The programming language R, widely used by statisticians and data scientists, was developed at the university by Robert Gentleman and Ross Ihaka in the 1990s.

Five current academics were named in Clarivate's Highly Cited Researchers list for 2025: Andrew Allan, Virginia Braun, Edward Gane, Kevin Trenberth and Ziyun Wang. The university's Research Excellence Medal for 2025 was awarded to Caroline Foster, Melinda Webber, and Paul Donaldson together with colleagues in the Molecular Vision Research Cluster.
