= Jane Taylor (lawyer) =

New Zealand lawyer

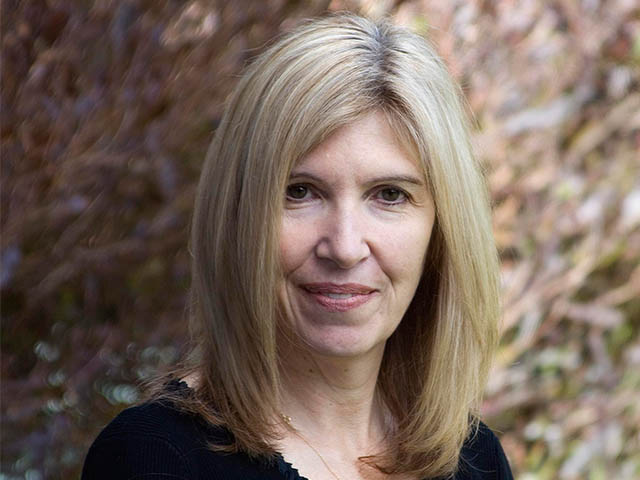

Chair of New Zealand Post
- In office 1 November 2016 – 31 October 2018
- Prime Minister: John Key; Bill English; Jacinda Ardern
- Preceded by: Michael Cullen
- Succeeded by: Jackie Lloyd (Acting)

Chair of Predator Free 2050
- Incumbent
- Assumed office 30 November 2016
- Prime Minister: John Key; Bill English; Jacinda Ardern
- Preceded by: Position Established

Personal details
- Born: Deborah Jane Strongman
- Spouses: Garry Muir (m. 1993; div. 1998); Mark Taylor (m. 1999)
- Profession: Professional Director

Jane Taylor is a New Zealand former barrister, chartered accountant and chair of the Board of New Zealand Post. She has held several directorial and board positions across many prominent New Zealand companies.

== Career ==
Taylor's current appointments include: Board Member at Aotearoa Circle (beginning 2019); Independent Director at Port Otago (beginning 2019); Chair of the Board at Orion Group (beginning 2019); Director at Ontario Teachers Pension Plan New Zealand Forest Investments Limited (beginning 2015); and Independent Director & Chair of the Audit and Risk Committee at Silver Fern Farms (beginning 2013).

Her previous appointments include: Chair of Predator Free 2050; Director of Hirepool Group and OTTP New Zealand Forest Investments; Deputy Chair of Radio New Zealand; and Chair of Landcare Research New Zealand. She was also a board member of the External Reporting Board (XRB).

Taylor was also a Director at Forestry Corporation of New Zealand Limited (1994 - 1996), GNS Science Limited (2008 - 2014), and the Research and Education Advanced Network Limited (2005 - 2011).

She holds honours degrees in Law from the University of Auckland and a postgraduate qualification in Accountancy, Accounting and Finance from Victoria University of Wellington. She also holds a Bachelor of Forestry Science (Hons) from the University of Canterbury. She is a solicitor of the High Court, a member of the New Zealand Law Society, and a member of Chartered Accountants of Australia and New Zealand (CAANZ).

Taylor is a current-resource consent commissioner for the Queenstown Lakes District Council (QLDC) having sat on "about 100 hearings panels" since her first panel in 2006.

== Controversies ==
=== New Zealand Post ===
In an article published 10 April 2018 in the National Business Review, it was reported that New Zealand Post, on Taylor's watch, was losing its mail delivery volumes faster than predicted. The article was published days after New Zealand Post announced a controversial increase in postage prices. The article also suggested that New Zealand Post was defying the new Labour-led Government by not focusing on providing dividends.

== Personal life ==
Taylor is a fifth-generation New Zealander, brought up in Coromandel, New Zealand. She attended secondary school in Auckland. She moved to Queenstown from Auckland in 2001. Taylor lives in Queenstown with youngest son and her husband, Mark Taylor, whom she married in 1999 in Arrowtown. She has four children; two with ex-husband Garry Muir, and one with current husband Mark Taylor; one of whom is a doctor at Middlemore Hospital, and another of whom is the chief executive officer and founder of TreeTime App, a non-profit tree planting organization.
