= Anthony Jennings (musician) =

New Zealander musician and academic (1945–1995)

Anthony Jennings (6 February 1945 – 30 July 1995) was a New Zealand harpsichordist, organist, choral and orchestral director, and academic. A proponent of the early-music movement, he advocated for authentic performing practices. He made several recordings of baroque music on the harpsichord. Musicologist J. M. Thomson wrote, that Jennings's "musical skills were wide-ranging and supported by a charismatic personality. A virtuoso organist, his performances of Romantic and contemporary repertory are remembered for their technical brilliance and musical power, but his special contribution was in the area of Baroque performance."

== Life and career ==
Born in Wellington, Jennings graduated from Victoria University of Wellington with a Bachelor of Music degree in 1968. He pursued postgraduate studies at the Royal Conservatory of Brussels during which time he was concurrently choirmaster of the Pro-Cathedral of the Holy Trinity, Brussels. He was awarded the Pro Arte Gold Medal by King Philippe of Belgium in 1972. In 1973 he graduated from the Guildhall School of Music and Drama in London with a doctorate in music. While a student at the GSM he was the assistant organist and choirmaster of St Albans Cathedral.

In 1974, Jennings returned to New Zealand to become the director of music at the Holy Trinity Cathedral, Auckland and a senior lecturer on the faculty of music at the University of Auckland. He remained in his post at Holy Trinity through 1985, making many professional recordings with the church's choir over his eleven year tenure. He left his post at the University of Auckland in 1991 when he took a position on the music faculty at the University of Newcastle in New South Wales. One of his notable pupils was Douglas Mews. Along with Peter Godfrey, John Hawley, and Roy Tankersley, he was of the leading church music directors in New Zealand during the second half of the 20th century.

In 1995 Jennings became the music director of the St James' Church, Sydney. He died soon after taking that post in Sydney, Australia on 30 July 1995.

== Partial discography ==
- Anthony Jennings – Fantastic Musick for the Italian Harpsichord (1990, Trust Records)
