= Richard John Pentreath =

British marine scientist

Richard John (usually known as ‘Jan’) Pentreath is a British marine scientist who made major contributions to radioecology, particularly with regard to alpha-emitting nuclides in the marine environment. He went on to broaden the international system of radiological protection to include animals and plants with respect to different exposure situations, as well as protection of the animal as patient in veterinary medicine. He also played a major role in the success of the National Rivers Authority and its subsequent merging with other bodies to form the Environment Agency.

== Education ==
Pentreath was a County scholar to Queen Mary College, University of London, graduating in zoology, with special honours in marine zoology. After winning a Commonwealth scholarship he did a PhD on ophiuroids (brittle stars) at the University of Auckland, New Zealand, being the first to do so at their Leigh Marine Laboratory, and returned to the UK to take up a Science Research Council Fellowship at the Fisheries Radiobiological Laboratory (FRL) at Hamilton Dock.

== Research and career ==
Becoming a member of staff at the Fisheries Radiobiological Laboratory in 1969, Pentreath carried out research into the behaviour, fate, and accumulation of various radionuclides (fission and neutron activation products, and those of the transuranic series) by marine fish and shellfish as well as the use of radiotracers to study various marine pollutants, being awarded a DSc (London) in 1980. He then became Head of Research (1985) at FRL, and then later deputy director of Fisheries Research. Pentreath was heavily involved with international organisations, particularly the International Atomic Energy Agency and the Nuclear Agency of the OECD, in relation to exchanging information and developing methodologies for these new areas of research, and in relation to the control of low-level dumping of radioactive wastes at sea, plus research into the feasibility of disposing of high level radioactive wastes into the tectonic plates of the ocean floor.

He was responsible for the task of cleaning up the rivers and estuaries of England and Wales. He was seconded to the Department of the Environment (DoE) in 1994 to help create the Environment Agency (EA) in 1995, then becoming its Chief Scientist and Director of Environmental Strategy.

In 2000 Pentreath became Professor of Environmental Sciences and Principal Research Fellow at the Environmental Systems Science Centre (ESSC), School of Mathematics, Meteorology and Physics, University of Reading until 2006, then becoming Professor Emeritus. During this period he was also appointed by the Secretary of State to the UK's Joint Nature Conservation Committee (2000-2006).

Pentreath produced a series of papers on the problem of demonstrating protection of the environment with respect to ionizing radiation, and how it could be addressed by the development of a set of ‘Reference Animals and Plants’. Pentreath has also continued to be involved with marine radioecology, and was recently engaged with evaluating the impact of nuclear powered vessels on the marine environment.

== Awards and honors ==
- Commonwealth scholar (1965)
- Science Research Council Fellow (1968)
- FRSB (1980)
- FSRP (1989)
- DSc (hc) University of Hertfordshire (1998)
- DSc (hc) University of West of England (1999)
- DSc (hc) University of Plymouth (2002)
- Emeritus research fellow, Centre for Environment, Fisheries and Aquaculture Science (2014)
- Emeritus Member ICRP Main Commission (2014)
- Hon. FSRP (2018)

== Publications ==
- Occurrence of plutonium and americium in plaice from the north–eastern Irish Sea.
- Transuranic nuclides in plaice (Pleuronectes platessa) from the north-eastern Irish Sea.
- Radiological protection of the patient in veterinary medicine and the role of ICRP.
- Radiological protection and the exposure of animals as patients in veterinary medicine.
- ICRP's approach to protection of the living environment under different exposure situations.
- ICRP Publication 124: Protection of the Environment under Different Exposure Situations.
- Clarifying and simplifying the management of environmental exposures under different exposure situations.
- Ethics, genetics and dynamics: An emerging systematic approach to radiation protection of the environment.
