= Constant Mews =

Professor of medieval thought

Constant Mews FAHA (born 1954), D.Phil (Oxon) is Professor of Medieval Thought and Director, Centre for Studies in Religion and Theology, Monash University, Melbourne. He is an authority on medieval religious thought, especially on the medieval philosopher and theologian, Peter Abelard, and on interfaith dialogue. He discovered and published what are possibly the original letters exchanged between Peter Abelard and his lover, Heloise.

== Early life ==
Mews is the son of composer, the late Douglas Mews and brother of musician and organist Douglas. He was born in England and spent his childhood there and in New Zealand. He completed his secondary education at St Peter's College, Auckland, New Zealand. He won the Trenwith Cup for History, the Taylor Cup for languages, the Arthur Bolland Cup for English and was the Dux equal (with Richard Segedin) of the college in his final year at St Peter's College in 1971.

== Academic career ==
Mews attended the University of Auckland and completed BA and MA degrees there in History. He carried out doctoral study at the University of Oxford, followed by five years (1980–1985) teaching British civilisation at the Universite de Paris III, while pursuing studies in medieval thought (focusing on Peter Abelard) in connection with Jean Jolivet, at the École pratique des hautes études en sciences religieuses. This was followed by two years as a Leverhulme research fellow at the University of Sheffield on editing the writings of Peter Abelard. Mews took up a position at Monash University as Lecturer in the Department of History in July 1987. He became involved in developing the Centre for Studies in Religion and Theology and in promoting studies in religion more generally, with a strong interest in interfaith work. He has had spells of study at the Institute for Advanced Study, Princeton, in 1990 and 2000, and has also again taught in Paris, at the École pratique des hautes études (Ve section) and in the École des hautes études en sciences sociales. He was elected a Fellow of the Australian Academy of the Humanities in 2005.

== Letters of Abelard and Heloise ==
In 1999 Mews published The Lost Love Letters of Heloise and Abelard. This contains about 113 medieval love letters, edited in 1974 by the German scholar Ewald Koensgen. The letters, ascribed simply to a man and woman, survived because a 15th-century monk copied them for an anthology. Having spent some 20 years studying Abelard's philosophical and theological writings, Mews concluded that the letters (the longest known correspondence between a man and a woman from the medieval period) were written by Abelard and Heloise. In 2005 the historian Sylvain Piron translated the correspondence into French.

Whether the letters were indeed the actual correspondence became a matter of intense scholarly debate in France. Mews and other scholars who support the authenticity case say all the evidence in and around the text points to Abelard and Heloise. Opponents say that is too simple and want definitive proof. They reject accusations of tunnel vision and deny they are motivated by professional envy at not having got there first. "It's not jealousy, it's a question of method," said Monique Goullet, director of research in medieval Latin at Paris's Sorbonne University. "If we had proof that it was Abelard and Heloise then everyone would calm down. But the current position among literature scholars is that we are shocked by too rapid an attribution process." But after his years of research, Mews is all the more convinced. "The first time I encountered the words and ideas they sent a shiver down my spine. Unfortunately, that has been attacked as evidence of an emotional response," he said. "There has been some very quick stereotyping of other people's arguments." Most Latin experts agree the document is authentic and of great literary worth, but its uniqueness makes some scholars suspicious. "The most probable explanation is that it is a literary work written by one person who decided to reconstitute the writings of Abelard and Heloise," Goullet said. Others say it was a stylistic exercise between two students who imagined themselves as the lovers, or that it was written by another couple. Mews has since discovered further textual parallels between the letters and the writings of Abelard which further support his arguments, included in Abelard and Heloise, Great Medieval Thinkers and journal articles published in 2007 and 2009.

== Selected works ==
- "Abelard and his Legacy", Variorum Reprints, London, Ashgate, 2001.
- "Reason and Belief in the Age of Roscelin and Abelard", Variorum Reprints, London, Ashgate, 2002.
- "The Lost Love Letters of Heloise and Abelard: Perceptions of Dialogue in Twelfth-Century France", Palgrave MacMillan, New York, 1999; 2nd edition, 2008.
- "Abelard and Heloise", New York, Oxford University Press, 2005.
- "Cicero and the Boundaries of Friendship in the Twelfth Century", Viator 38/2 (2007), 369–384.
- "Discussing Love: The Epistolae duorum amantium and Abelard's Sic et Non", Journal of Medieval Latin 19 (2009), 130–47.
