= Bryony James =

New Zealand engineering academic

Bryony Joanne James
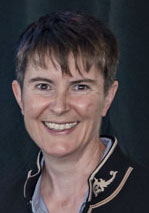
- Born: 1970 or 1971 (age 54–56)
- Education: University of Auckland
- Scientific career
- Fields: Food microstructure
- Workplaces: University of Auckland, University of Waikato, Victoria University of Wellington
- Thesis: The oxidation reactions of heterogeneous carbon cathodes used in the electrolytic production of aluminium (1997)

Bryony Joanne James (born 1970 or 1971) is a professor of engineering who is Vice-Chancellor of Victoria University of Wellington.

== Academic career ==
After a 1997 PhD titled 'The oxidation reactions of heterogeneous carbon cathodes used in the electrolytic production of aluminium' at the University of Auckland, James joined the staff, rising to full professor.

Much of her work involves engineering properties of food. In 2017 James, Dr Gant, Associate Professor MJ Hautus and Professor EA Foegeding were awarded a Marsden Fund grant for a study titled Why do texturally complex foods lead us to eat less?.

From 2020 to 2023, Bryony was Deputy Vice-Chancellor (Research) at the University of Waikato.

In 2023, Bryony was appointed Provost at Victoria University of Wellington.

In May 2026, Bryony James was announced as the next Vice-Chancellor of Victoria University of Wellington following the departure of Nic Smith. James is the first female to hold the position of Vice-Chancellor of Victoria University of Wellington.

== Selected works ==
- James, Bryony J., Yan Jing, and Xiao Dong Chen. "Membrane fouling during filtration of milk––a microstructural study." Journal of Food Engineering 60, no. 4 (2003): 431–437.
- Lee, Brendan J., Armando G. McDonald, and Bryony James. "Influence of fiber length on the mechanical properties of wood-fiber/polypropylene prepreg sheets." Materials research innovations 4, no. 2-3 (2001): 97–103.
- Patel, Krishal, Colin S. Doyle, Daisuke Yonekura, and Bryony J. James. "Effect of surface roughness parameters on thermally sprayed PEEK coatings." Surface and Coatings Technology 204, no. 21-22 (2010): 3567–3572.
- James, Bryony J., and Bronwen G. Smith. "Surface structure and composition of fresh and bloomed chocolate analysed using X-ray photoelectron spectroscopy, cryo-scanning electron microscopy and environmental scanning electron microscopy." LWT-Food Science and Technology 42, no. 5 (2009): 929–937.
- Lynne, Bridget Y., Kathleen A. Campbell, Bryony J. James, Patrick RL Browne, and Joseph Moore. "Tracking crystallinity in siliceous hot-spring deposits." American Journal of Science 307, no. 3 (2007): 612–641.
