= Kirkman =

Kirkman can refer to:

- Kirkman (surname)
- Kirkman (harpsichord makers), an English harpsichord-making family

== Places ==
In the United States:

- Kirkman, Iowa
- Kirkman House, Walla Walla, Washington
