= Nic Smith =

New Zealand academic and university administrator

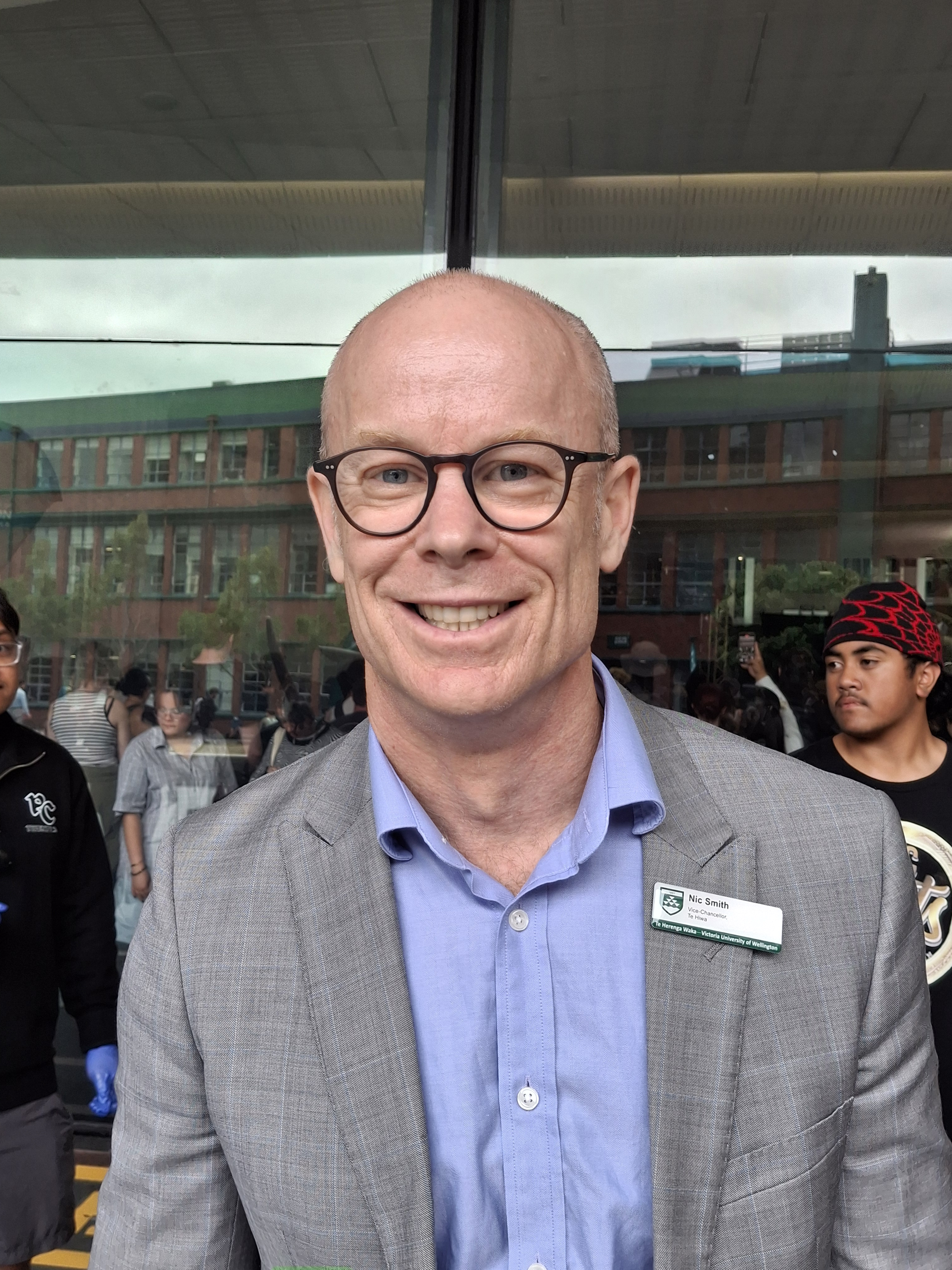
- Smith in 2025

Vice-Chancellor of the University of Auckland
- Incumbent
- Assumed office 3 August 2026
- Preceded by: Dawn Freshwater

Vice-Chancellor of Victoria University of Wellington
- In office 2023–2026
- Preceded by: Grant Guilford

Personal details
- Born: Nicholas Smith New Zealand
- Education: University of Auckland
- Occupation: Academic administrator
- Profession: Biomedical engineer
- Known for: University leadership and biomedical engineering

Nic Smith is a New Zealand academic and university administrator. Smith has served as the vice-chancellor of the University of Auckland since 3 August 2026. He previously served as the vice-chancellor of Victoria University of Wellington from 2023 to 2026. Smith has also held senior academic leadership positions at the Queensland University of Technology, University of Auckland, King's College London, and the University of Oxford.

== Early life and education ==
Smith completed a Doctor of Philosophy (PhD) in bioengineering and biomedical engineering at the University of Auckland between 1996 and 1999.

== Academic career ==
Smith began his academic career in biomedical engineering and computational physiology. In 2008, he was appointed professor of computational physiology at the University of Oxford.

From 2011 to 2013, he served as professor of biomedical engineering at King's College London, where he led the establishment of a new biomedical engineering department and oversaw the development of its teaching and research programmes.

In 2013, Smith returned to New Zealand to become the dean of engineering at the University of Auckland. He held the position until 2020 and was responsible for the academic, financial, and operational leadership of the faculty.

He later moved to Australia to serve as provost of the Queensland University of Technology from 2020 to 2022. As provost, Smith was the university's chief academic officer and oversaw the institution's education and research portfolios.

Smith is a fellow of the Royal Society Te Apārangi and Engineering New Zealand.

== Vice-chancellor roles ==
=== Victoria University of Wellington ===
In 2022, Smith was appointed vice-chancellor of Victoria University of Wellington, succeeding Grant Guilford.

He formally commenced the role in January 2023.

During his tenure, Smith advocated for changes in higher education leadership and institutional culture, including public commentary on leadership and university reform.

=== University of Auckland ===
In February 2026, the University of Auckland announced Smith as its next vice-chancellor, succeeding Dawn Freshwater.

== Research ==
Smith's academic research has focused on biomedical engineering, computational physiology, and bioengineering.
