= Hunter Building =

Coordinates: 41.2880°S 174.7690°E

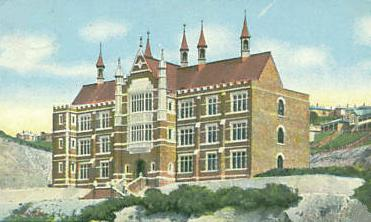
- Post card of the Hunter Building, Victoria University College 1908
- Interactive map of the Hunter Building area

General information
- Type: University building
- Architectural style: Gothic revival
- Location: Victoria University of Wellington, Wellington, New Zealand
- Construction started: 27 August 1904
- Completed: 30 March 1906
- Owner: Victoria University of Wellington

Design and construction
- Architects: Penty & Blake

Heritage New Zealand – Category 1
- Designated: 26-Nov-1981
- Reference no.: 221

The Hunter Building is the original building of Victoria University of Wellington's Kelburn campus in Wellington, New Zealand. It is a major landmark in the Wellington region and closely associated and considered a symbol of the university. The distinct architecture of the building is a notable example of Edwardian Gothic-revival, with red brick and Oamaru stone façade, along with grand internal entrances, staircases and original university library. The building is a noteworthy example of work from the Wellington architectural practice of Penty & Blake. While opened on 30 March 1906, the building was not completed to its original design, but was progressively added to as the college grew. The building is named after Sir Thomas Alexander Hunter, a well regarded professor of mental science and political economy. Following the end of the Great War, northern and southern wings were added to the building, providing new teaching areas, recreational spaces and a new library.

The Hunter Building once housed the entire university, and some of New Zealand's most respected academics along with thousands of students have taught, worked and studied in this building. It is now the administrative centre of the university, being home to the offices of the Vice-Chancellor, the university Council Chamber and the Victoria Room, and a number of pieces of the Victoria University of Wellington Art Collection.

== History ==
=== Background and construction ===
Victoria University College, was established by an Act of Parliament, the Victoria College Act of 1897, in commemoration of the 60th year of Queen Victoria’s reign. The college was a constituent college of the University of New Zealand. The 13 acre Alexandra Barracks site located in the suburb of Mount Cook was proposed as the location for a permanent campus. This site was widely supported in Wellington, release of the land for academic purposes was stalled by the Seddon Government. In February 1901 an offer was made by a wealthy Wairarapa sheep farmer Charles Pharazyn, who offered to donate £1000 if the college was built on a 6-acre plot of hilly land in Kelburn. Construction began in 1902, with the regrading of the hillside, with the construction of a main building following shortly after, designed by local architects Penty & Blake in the Gothic Revival style. At the request of Richard Seddon, the design gained a more imposing demeanor through the insistence of adding a third level. The then governor of New Zealand, Lord Plunket, laid the foundation stone on 27 August 1904. The building was opened on 30 March 1906. At the time, the building was a prominent landmark on the bare hills of Kelburn overlooking the city.

=== Expansion ===
The first addition came with an extension of the arts block, to the west of the building in 1909. Following The Great War, a large extension to the north of the building was constructed, containing a memorial library. This was dedicated to the university's fallen of World War I and included a large stained-glass commemorative window unveiled by Sir Robert Stout, Chancellor of the University of New Zealand, on Good Friday 1924. The stained glass window contained references to the locations New Zealand troops served in, along with a demonstration of the ancestral ties of New Zealand to Great Britain, showcasing a New Zealand soldier alongside crusader Richard the Lionheart. The architects were Swan and Lawrence who hired a gothic architecture specialist, Andrew Hamilton, to help with the design. A further south wing was added in 1923, again to designs by Swan and Lawrence, to provide further room for the geology and physics departments. Until the construction of the distinctly modernist Rankine Brown library after World War II, this wing housed the university's library collection.

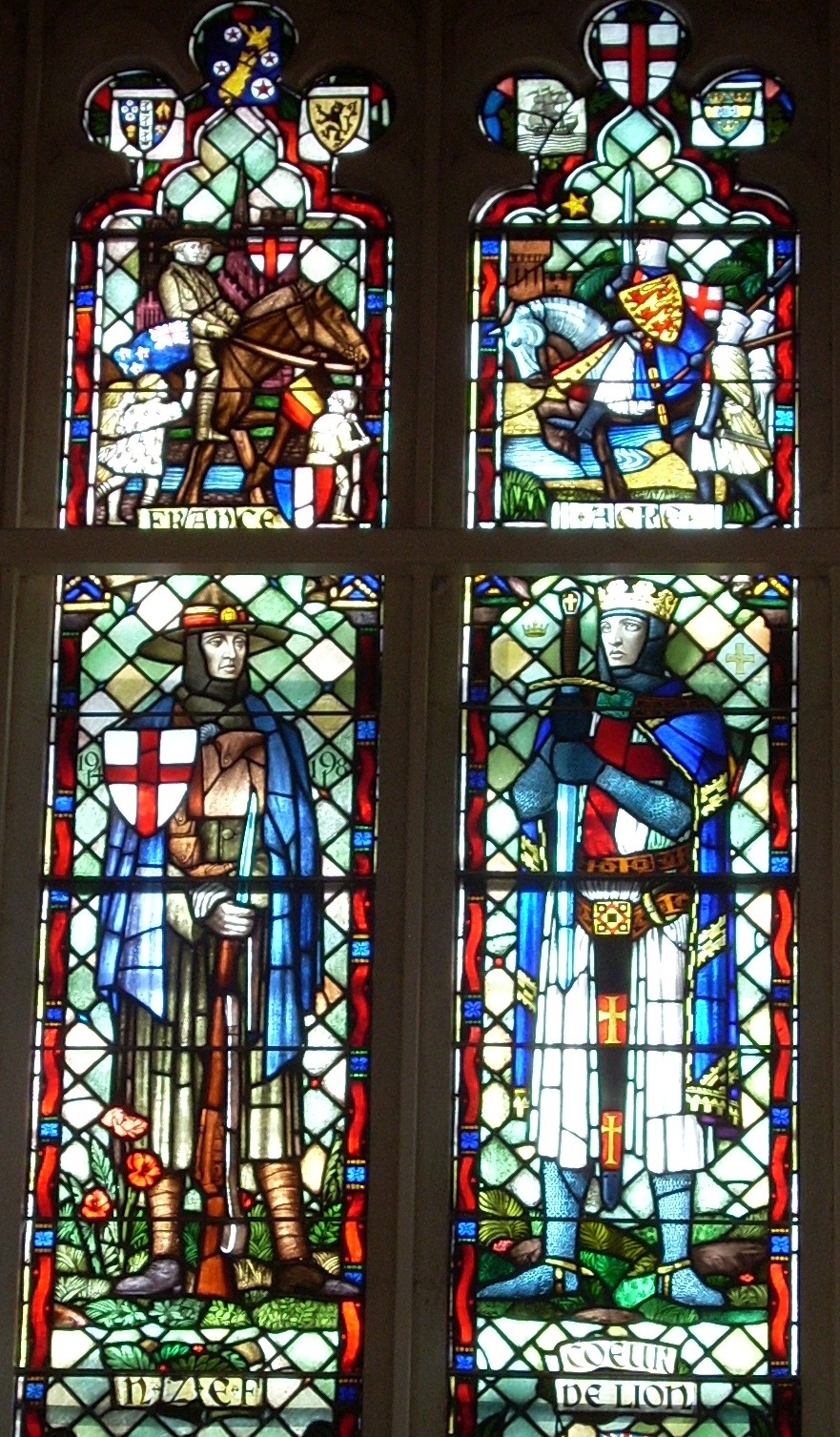
Section of the memorial window in the old University Library

As the university expanded, particularly in the post-war boom after World War II, departments gradually moved to new premises in the Kirk and Easterfield buildings. This resulted in the centre of the university shifting southwards away from the building. In 1959 the building was named for Sir Thomas Hunter, a former Vice Chancellor of the University of New Zealand and the first principal of Victoria College. From this period, to the 1970s, the building remained largely unchanged, being used on a daily basis.

=== Conservation debate and revival ===
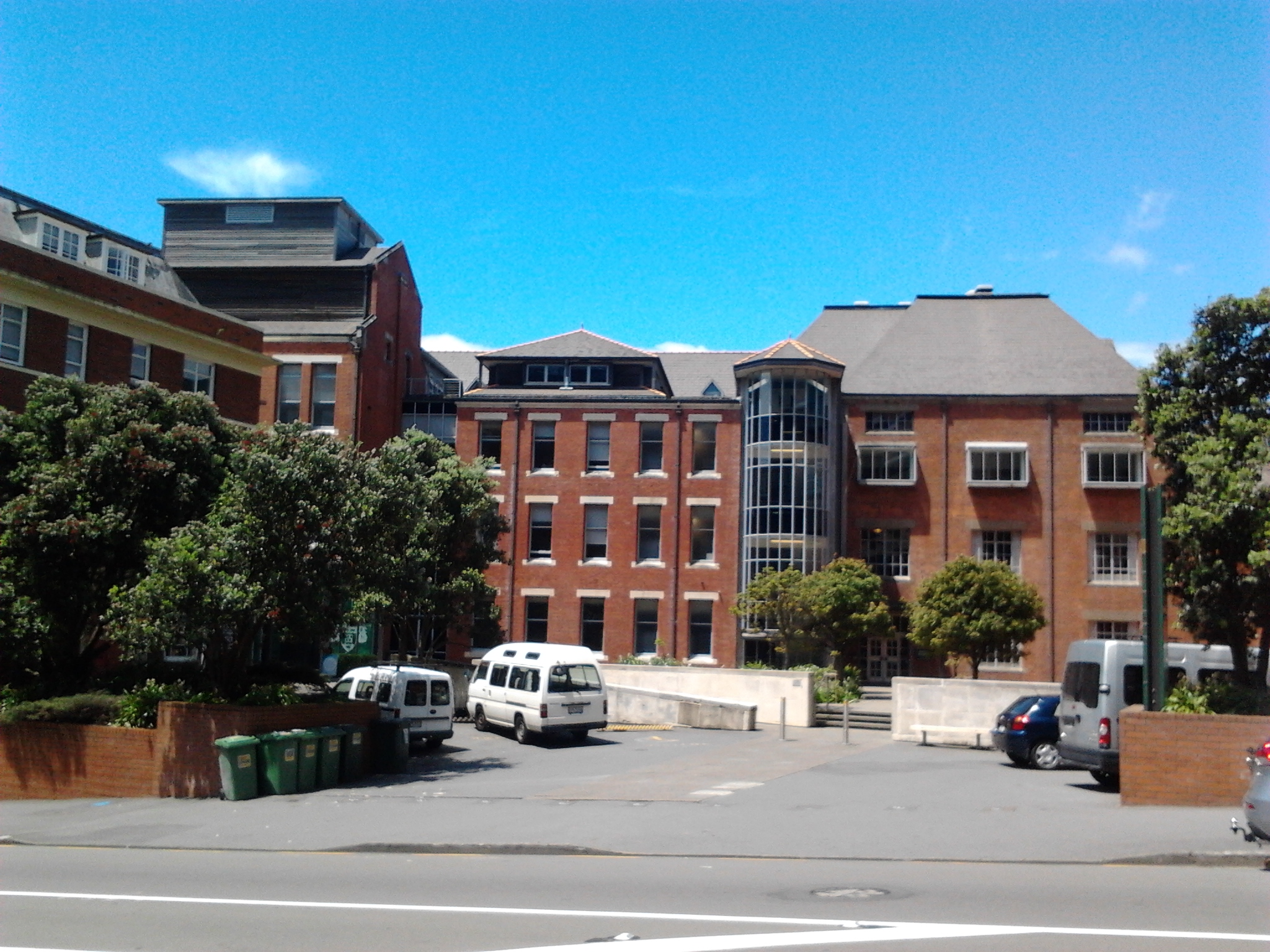
The Hunter Building, viewed from the Hunter Courtyard.

In 1974, following a period of significant demolition of older buildings in Wellington, the building was declared an earthquake risk and shuttered. A debate ensued between university officials, alumni and students on whether the building should be retained or demolished. This occurred during the period in which the university was celebrating its 75th anniversary, as well as in the midst of the university considering changing its name to "University of Wellington". These measures were ultimately dropped, in the wake of criticism that the university was facing criticism for paying scant notice to its own, as well as the cities heritage. The university administration opposed the Wellington City Council's attempt to list the Hunter Building as a heritage building, and the then mayor and architect Michael Fowler, allegedly described the university as a “bloody pack of rascals.” This insult apparently reflected Fowler's opinion that the universities consultants had inflated the cost of saving the building. In his view, VUW was abrogating its responsibility for not saving the building. By September 1977, the Council decided to demolish the Hunter Building. A group of alumni and associated parties formed the Friends of Hunter Society to save the building, delivering a 2000 signature petition. Concerted efforts to save the building ensued for more than a decade. The Hunter building was registered as a Category 1 Historic Place with the Heritage New Zealand in 1981. Eventually major strengthening and refurbishment proceeded until 1994, when the building was reoccupied. In 2004 the building celebrated its 100th birthday.

The courtyard area surrounding the Western side of the Hunter Building was significantly refurbished in 2020, along with a rebuild of the glass reception atrium attached to the building.

== Significance ==
The Hunter Building has seen its role in the university comparatively diminish with the southern expansion of the post-war era. The university has now spread over Kelburn Hill, with most activity centering around the Tim Beaglehole courtyard and central hub between the Easterfield and Rankine-Brown buildings. However, the Hunter Building still retains a degree of importance to Victoria University, being the building most closely associated with the institution. The building additionally marked the arrival of tertiary education to the city of Wellington. Wellington City Heritage considers that the building has iconic status in Wellington second only to the St Gerard’s Church and Monastery, with one symbolising education and the other symbolising religion.

== See also ==
- Victoria University of Wellington
- Gothic Revival architecture
- Edwardian era
