= Kirkman (surname) =

Kirkman is a surname. Notable people with the name include:

- Alan Kirkman (1936–2011), English footballer
- Allison Kirkman, New Zealand sociology academic
- Boone Kirkman (born 1945), American Heavyweight boxer
- Christina Kirkman, American actress, comedian, and rapper
- Ellen Kirkman, American mathematician
- Francis Kirkman, 17th century literary figure
- George W. Kirkman (1867–1951), American Army officer
- Jen Kirkman (born 1974), American actor, writer and comedian
- Marshall Monroe Kirkman (1842–1921), American authority on railways
- Norman Kirkman (1920–1995), an English footballer and football manager
- Blessed Richard Kirkman, martyr in York with William Lacy
- Rick Kirkman (born 1953), cartoonist
- Robert Kirkman (born 1978), comic book writer
- Robert Kirby Kirkman (1891–1938), English soldier
- Roger Kirkman (1905–1973), American football player
- Sidney Kirkman (1895–1982), British Army general
- Terry Kirkman (1939–2023), musician
- Thomas Kirkman (1806–1895), mathematician
- Tim Kirkman, film maker
- Tom Kirkman, fictional character
- William Kirkman (born 1961), Australian cricketer
