= Victoria University of Wellington =

Public university in Wellington, New Zealand

- Te Herenga Waka (Māori)
- Motto: Latin: Sapientia magis auro desideranda
- Motto in English: Wisdom is more to be desired than gold
- Type: Public
- Established: 1897; 129 years ago
- Academic affiliations: ACU, AACSB, AMBA, EQUIS
- Endowment: NZ$130.3 million (31 December 2025)
- Budget: NZ$467.3 million (31 December 2024)
- Chancellor: Alan Judge
- Vice-Chancellor: Bryony James
- Academic staff: 1,018 (2024)
- Total staff: 2,202 (2024)
- Students: 20,939 total (2024); 14,250 EFTS (2024)
- Location: Wellington, New Zealand; 41°17′20″S 174°46′06″E
- Campus: Urban
- Student magazine: Salient
- Colours: Green and white
- Website: wgtn.ac.nz

Victoria University of Wellington (Māori: Te Herenga Waka; VUW or Vic) is a public research university in Wellington, New Zealand. It was established in 1897 by an act of the New Zealand Parliament, and was originally a constituent college of the University of New Zealand until the dissolution of that institution in 1961.

Victoria University had the highest average research grade in the New Zealand Government's Performance Based Research Fund exercise in both 2012 and 2018, having been ranked 4th in 2006 and 3rd in 2003.

== History ==
Victoria University of Wellington (originally known as Victoria College or Victoria University College) was founded in 1897, named after Queen Victoria, on the 60th anniversary of her coronation. Following the dissolution of the University of New Zealand in 1961, it became Victoria University of Wellington and began conferring its own degrees.

=== Early history and colonial politics ===
In 1868, the colonial government of New Zealand passed the University Endowment Act 1868, which established scholarship programmes for study in Great Britain, in addition to setting aside a land endowment in the burgeoning colony. The following year, with wealth generated from the Otago gold rush in addition to a strong foundation of the Scottish Enlightenment, the provincial government of Otago laid the groundwork to establish the University of Otago. This was followed by the creation of Canterbury College, associated with the newly formed University of New Zealand.

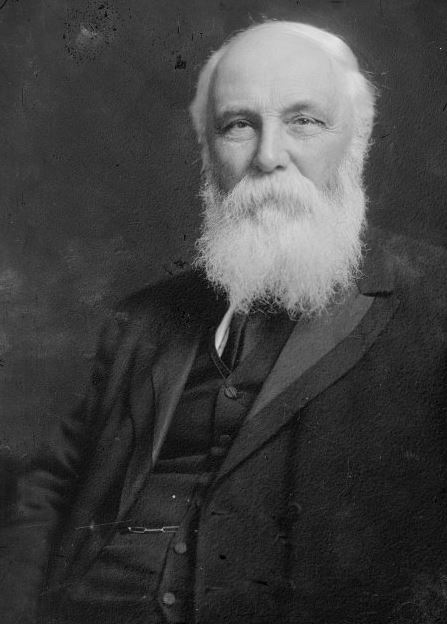
Robert Stout, 'The Father of Victoria College'

In 1878, a royal commission was appointed to review the state of higher education in the country. It recommended the establishment of a federal system of four university colleges: two to be established in Auckland and Wellington, as well as the integration of the University of Otago and Canterbury College. The colonial government moved to provide sites, statutory grants and land endowments. This was somewhat delayed after the state of recession caused by the collapse of the City of Glasgow Bank in the same year, leading to a contraction in credit from Great Britain, and specifically London, the centre of global finance at the time. Nevertheless, in 1882, parliament passed the Auckland University College Act in 1882.

The growth of the population of Wellington and gradual improvement of the economy in the late 1880s were key factors in the final establishment of Victoria University College. A prominent advocate of its creation was Robert Stout, Premier of New Zealand and later Chief Justice, and a member of the university senate. In June 1886, as Minister of Education, Stout signalled the government's intention to introduce a bill to establish a centre for higher learning in Wellington, which was the centre of the colonial government. Stout cited the opportunity for the college to be able to particularly specialise in law, political science, and history.

Stout further suggested that the staff of the New Zealand Colonial Museum could provide services in the fields of geology and natural history. This was indicated in the Wellington University College Bill of 1887, which meant the effective annexation of the museum. Colonial Museum director James Hector, however, voiced considerable opposition to this bill. After a lengthy debate in parliament, this bill was defeated.

=== Establishment ===
In 1897, the premier, Richard Seddon, who had previously been unsupportive of the university project, returned from Queen Victoria's Diamond Jubilee celebrations in Great Britain with an honorary law degree from the University of Cambridge. Seddon decided that the establishment of a college in Wellington would be a suitable way to mark the Queen's jubilee year.

When introducing the Victoria College Bill in December 1897, Seddon stated, "I do not think there will be any question as to the necessity for the establishment of a University College here in Wellington".

The college was to be governed by a 16-man council, with its inaugural meeting taking place on 23 May 1898.

=== Founding professors ===
The founding professors of Victoria College were:

- John Rankine Brown – Professor of Classics
- Hugh Mackenzie – Professor of English language and Literature
- Thomas Easterfield – Professor of Chemistry and Physics
- Richard Cockburn Maclaurin – Professor of Mathematics

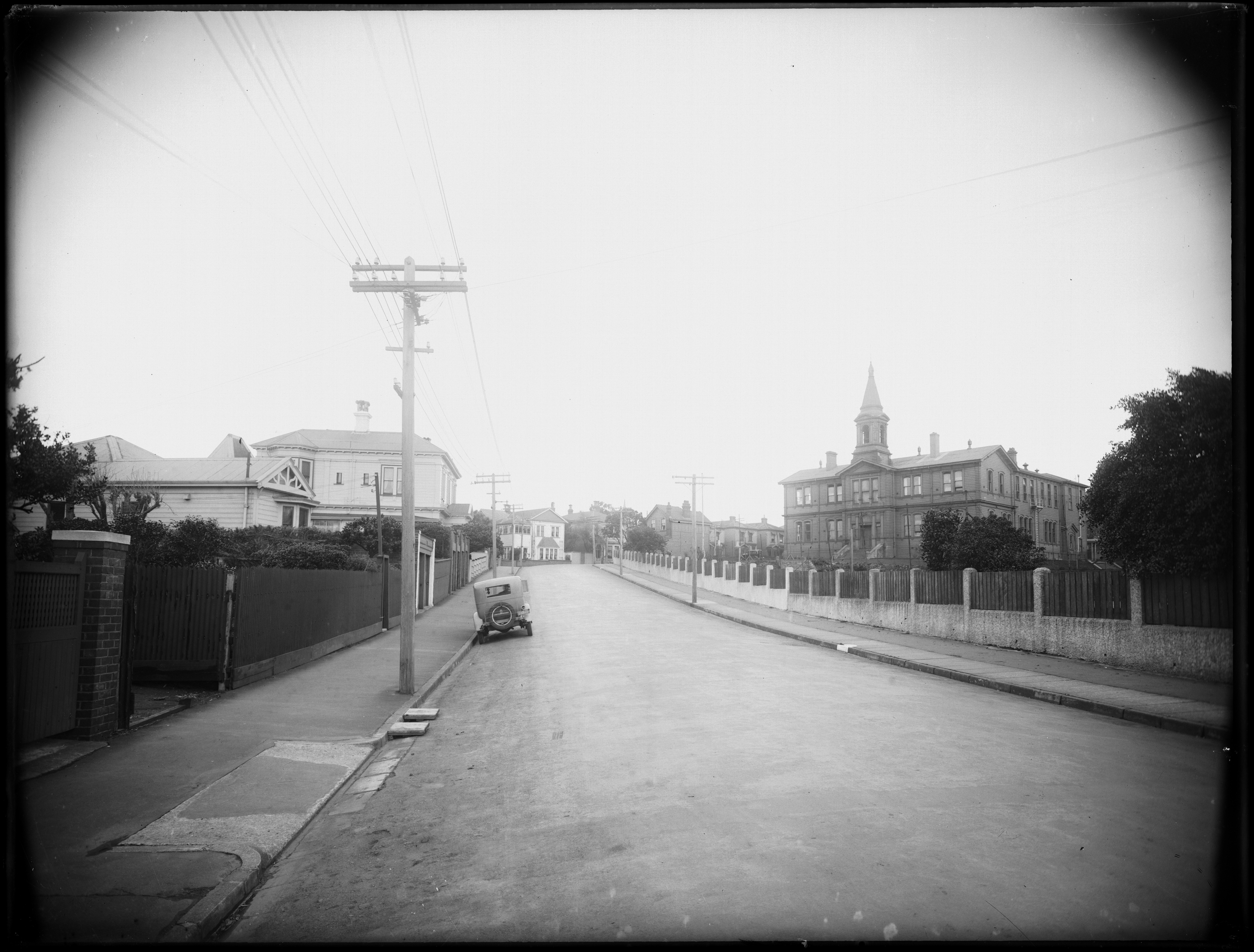
Wellington Girls High School building situated on the right, where early classes were held

=== Early days ===
While Victoria College had been legally founded with a grant, a council and a number of students, it had no physical property for the first decade of its existence. Early courses were held at Wellington Girls' High School and the Technical School building on Victoria Street.

The professors set about creating a unique identity for the college. The motto "Sapientia magis auro desideranda" was adopted in 1902. In 1903, the college adopted a badge and coat of arms featuring three crowns, the stars of the Southern Cross and the crest of its namesake Wellington. It was at this time that the colours of the college were chosen; dark green and gold, taking inspiration of the colours of the nearby gorse-covered Tinakori Hill.

In 1903 the council intended to establish a professorship in law, 'with a desire of making the Law School at Wellington the most complete in the Colony', as soon as financially possible. The college appointed a fifth professor, in modern languages – selecting the Oxford-educated Anglo-German George von Zedlitz, who was joined by newly appointed New Zealand-educated biology professor Harry Borrer Kirk.

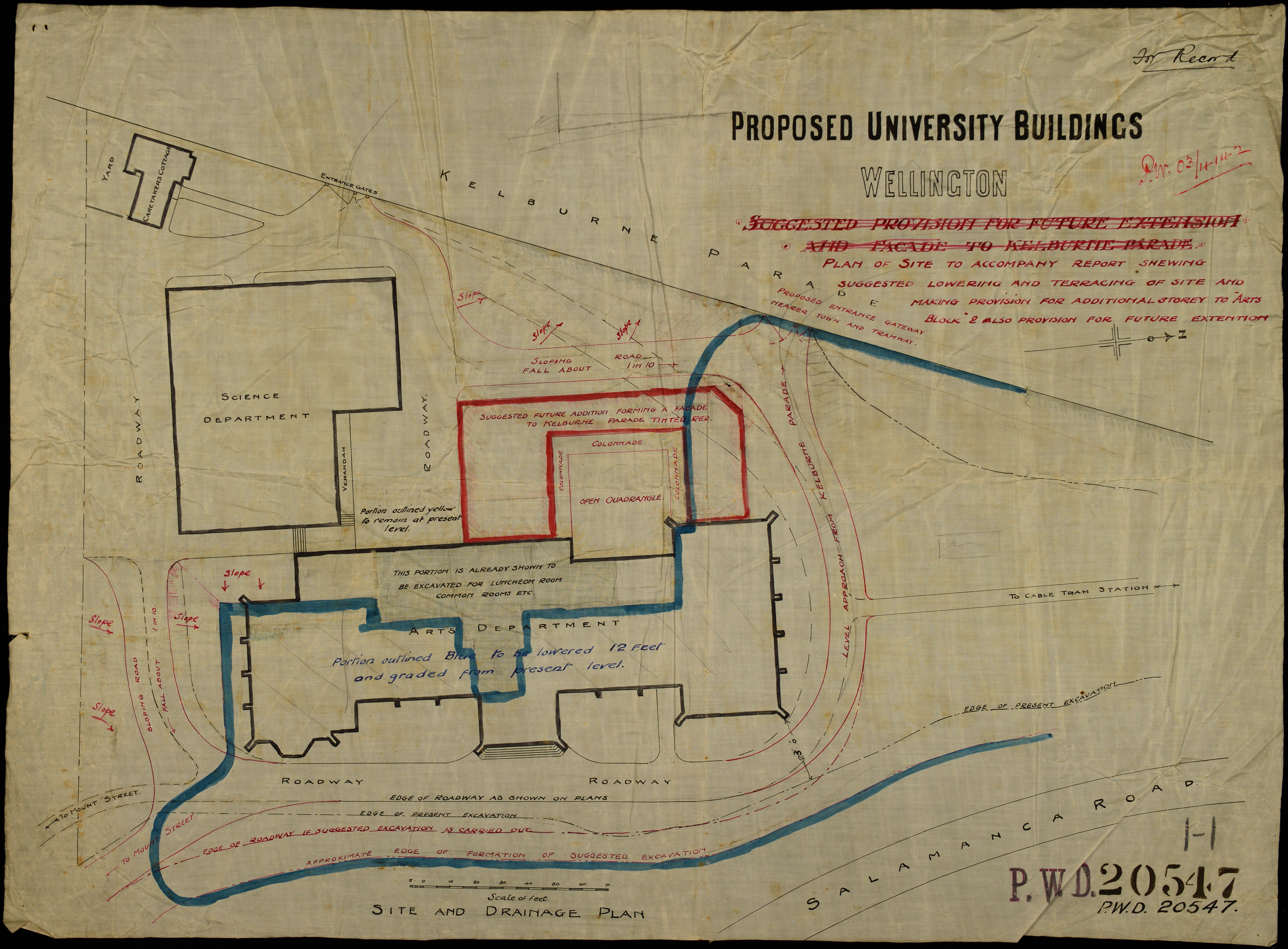
The 1903 plan for the University Campus at Kelburn

=== Kelburn campus ===
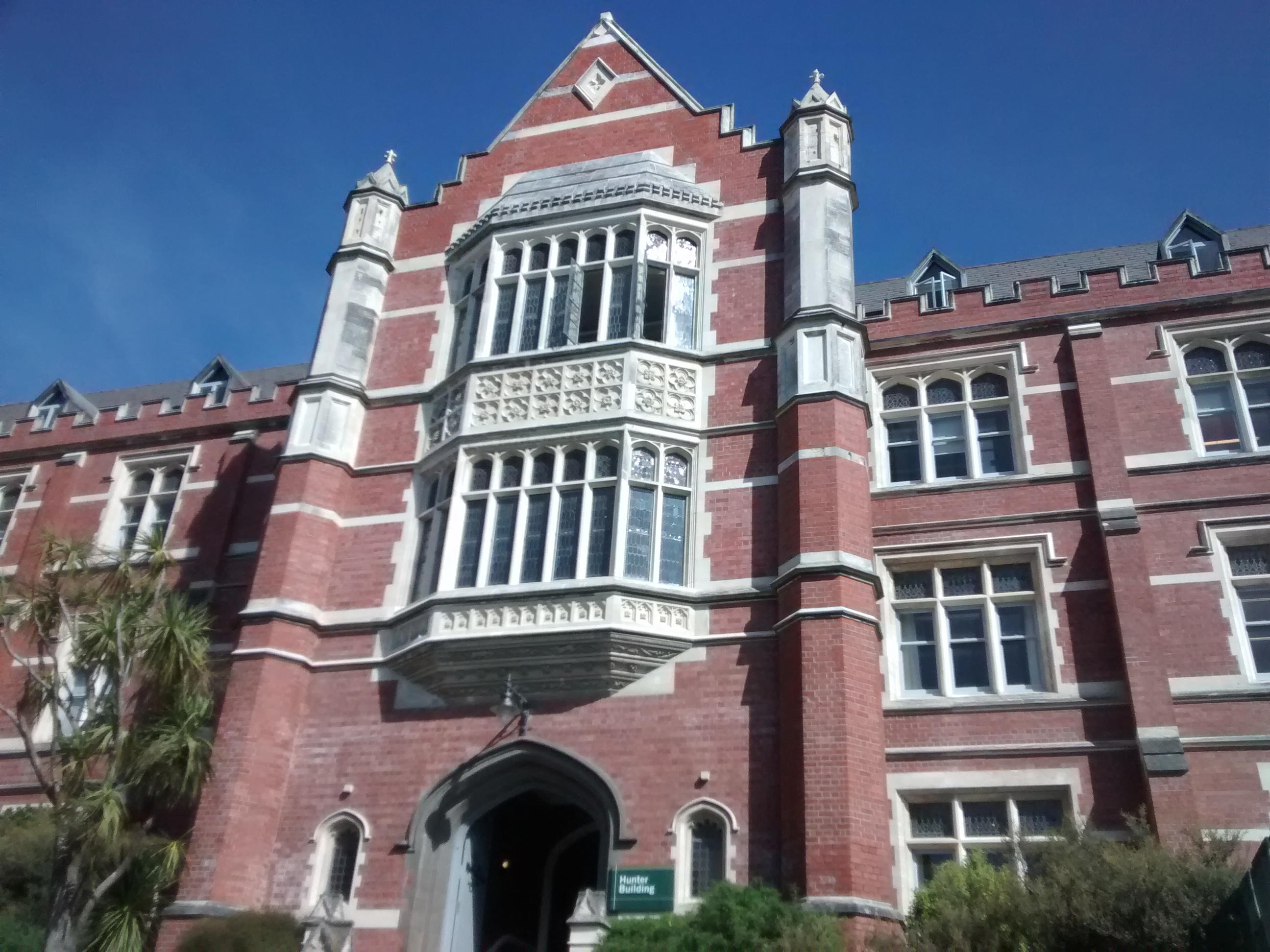
The Hunter Building

The newly appointed council in 1889 had considered the use of the 13-acre Alexandra Barracks site for a permanent campus. The site was widely supported in Wellington, but release of the land for academic purposes was stalled by the Seddon Government. In February 1901, an offer was made by a wealthy Wairarapa sheep farmer named Charles Pharazyn. Pharazyn offered to donate £1,000 if the college was built on a 6-acre plot of hilly land in Kelburn.

Construction began in 1902 with the regrading of the hillside. Construction of a main building followed shortly after, designed by local architects F. Penty and E. M. Blake in the Gothic Revival style. The then-governor of New Zealand, Lord Plunket, laid the foundation stone on 27 August 1904.

Although it opened on 30 March 1906, the building was not completed to its original design, but was progressively added to as the college grew. In the meantime, students had built tennis courts, and a wooden gymnasium and social hall were constructed. The main building was named after Thomas Hunter, a professor of mental science and political economy. Following the end of World War I, north and south wings were added to the building, providing new teaching areas, recreational spaces, and a new library.

=== Development ===
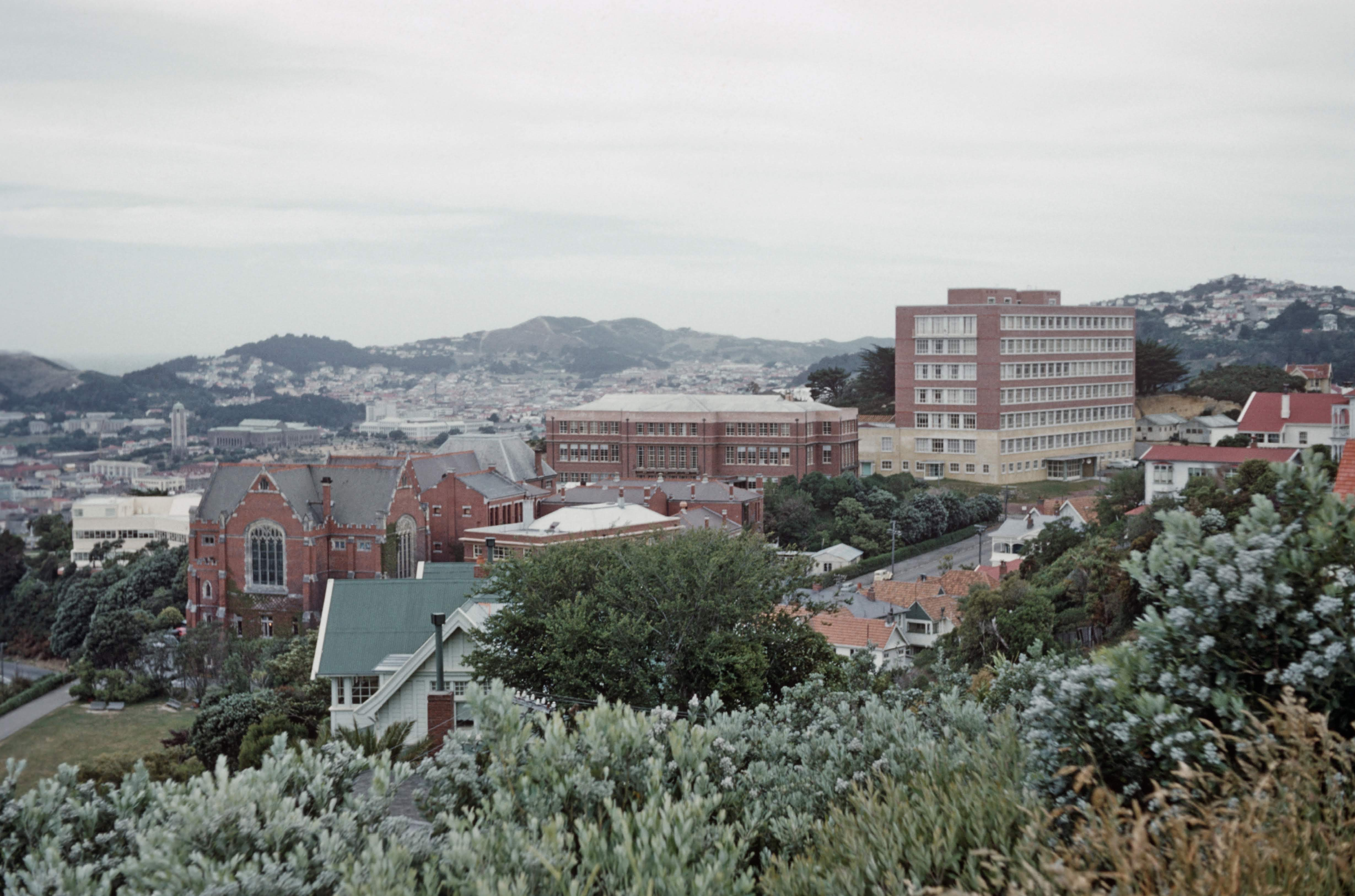
The university in December 1961

An extramural branch was founded at Palmerston North in 1960. It merged with Massey College on 1 January 1963. Having become a branch of Victoria upon the University of New Zealand's 1961 demise, the merged college became Massey University on 1 January 1964.

Victoria University has expanded beyond its original campus in Kelburn, with campuses in Te Aro (Faculty of Architecture and Design), and Pipitea (opposite Parliament, housing the Faculty of Law and Victoria Business School). Victoria also hosts the Ferrier Research Institute and the Robinson Research Institute in Lower Hutt, the Coastal Ecology Laboratory in Island Bay and the Miramar Creative Centre, in Park Road, Miramar.

In 2015, Victoria opened a new campus in Auckland to service growing demand for its courses and expertise.

=== Name-change proposal ===
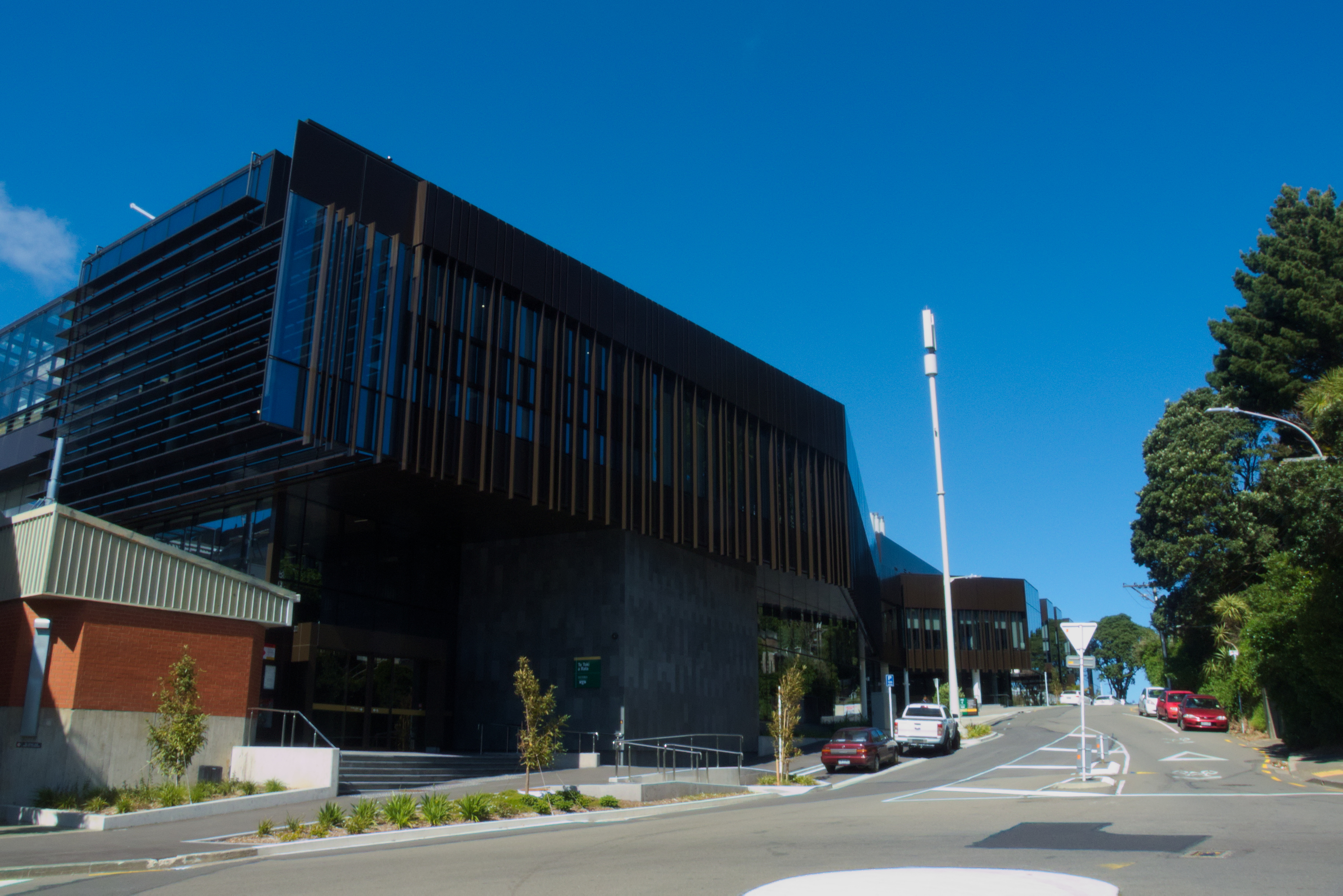
The Te Toki a Rata building was completed in 2017, and houses the School of Biological Sciences.

In May 2018 it was reported that Victoria was exploring options to simplify its name to the University of Wellington. Vice-chancellor Grant Guillford said the university was pursuing a name change in order to reduce confusion overseas, as several other universities also carried the "Victoria" name. On 27 July 2018, the Victoria University of Wellington Council agreed in principle to the name change, as well as replacing the former Māori name Te Whare Wānanga o Te Upoko o Te Ika a Maui with Te Herenga Waka, the name of the university's marae. Of 2,000 public submissions on the name-change proposal, 75% strongly opposed it. Alumni and students strongly opposed the name change, staff gave mixed feedback, while Wellington's regional mayors and members of the university's advisory board favoured the name change.

On 24 September 2018, Victoria University's council voted by a majority of nine to two to change the university's name to the University of Wellington. The council also voted to adopt the new Māori name Te Herenga Waka. The university's vice-chancellor Grant Guilford abstained from the vote, citing a conflict of interest. Critics such as Victoria University law professor Geoff McLay criticised the name change for erasing 120 years of history. In contrast, Chancellor Neil Paviour-Smith defended the outcome of the vote as "one decision in a much broader strategy to try and help the university really achieve its potential". The council would submit its recommendation to the Minister of Education to make the final decision.

On 18 December 2018, the minister for education, Chris Hipkins, announced that he had rejected the University Council's recommendation, stating that the proposed change did not have sufficient support from Victoria's staff, students or alumni, and that such a change would not be in keeping with institutional accountability or be in the national interest. On 6 May 2019 Victoria University's council announced that it would not contest the Education Minister's decision to reject its name-change proposal. The name change had received exceptionally strong opposition from faculty, alumni, students, and Wellington City Council.

The university has, in recent years, distanced itself from the word Victoria, with many promotional materials referring solely to "Wellington's University". Many departments and initiatives have also been rebranded; for example, Victoria Professional and Executive Development becoming Wellington Uni-Professional. In January 2021, the university spent $69,000 on a new sign highlighting the word Wellington, which drew criticism from students and staff who said the funds could have been better spent elsewhere.

=== 2023 financial crisis ===
In May 2023, vice-chancellor Nic Smith confirmed that Victoria University was facing a NZ$33 million deficit due to declining student enrolments and a shortfall in government funding. The number of enrolments in 2023 dropped by 12.1% compared to 2022, accounting for 2,600 fewer students. In addition, the number of full-time students declined from 17,000 in 2022 to 14,700 in 2023. To address this deficit, Smith proposed laying off between 230 and 260 staff members including 100 academics and 150 professional staff. On 27 June 2023, the New Zealand Government announced a NZ$128 million funding injection for New Zealand universities' degree and postgraduate-level programmes that would come into effect from 2024. In response to the announcement, Victoria University Tertiary Education Union branch president Dougal McNeill called on the university to shelve its planned staff cuts. Vice-chancellor Smith said that the funding injection would allow the university to save about a third of the 229 planned job cuts.

In October 2023, Victoria University issued a request for proposal to sell 24 properties, worth about $16 million, to recover its deficit. Of these properties, 11 were student flats, three of which were unoccupied.

== Campuses and facilities ==
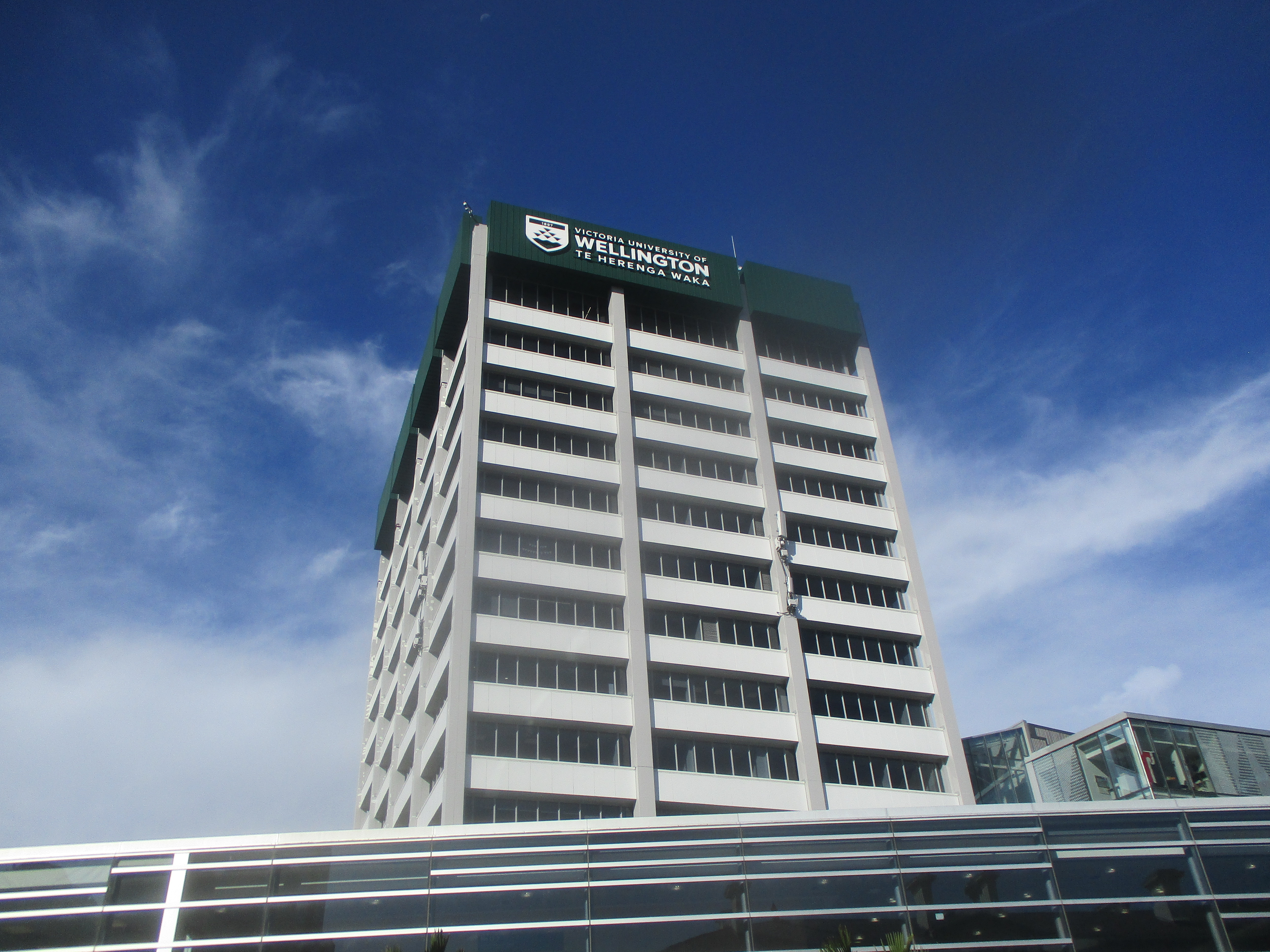
Victoria University of Wellington

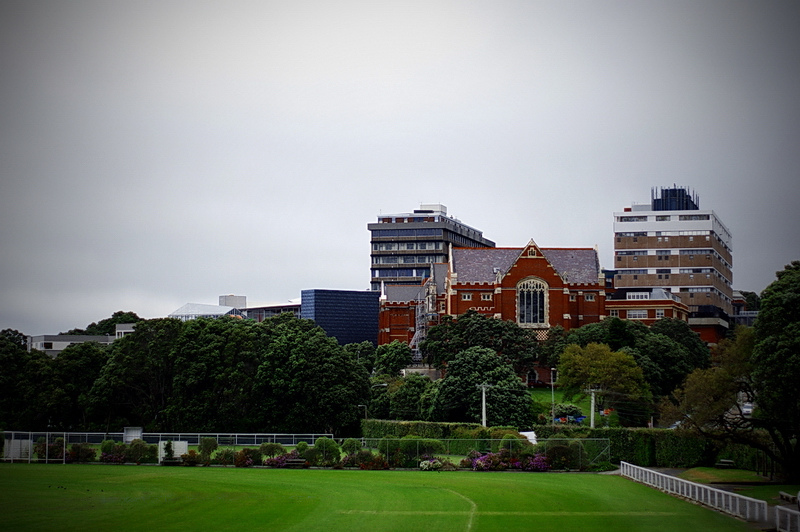
Victoria University of Wellington's Kelburn Campus: the Hunter Building

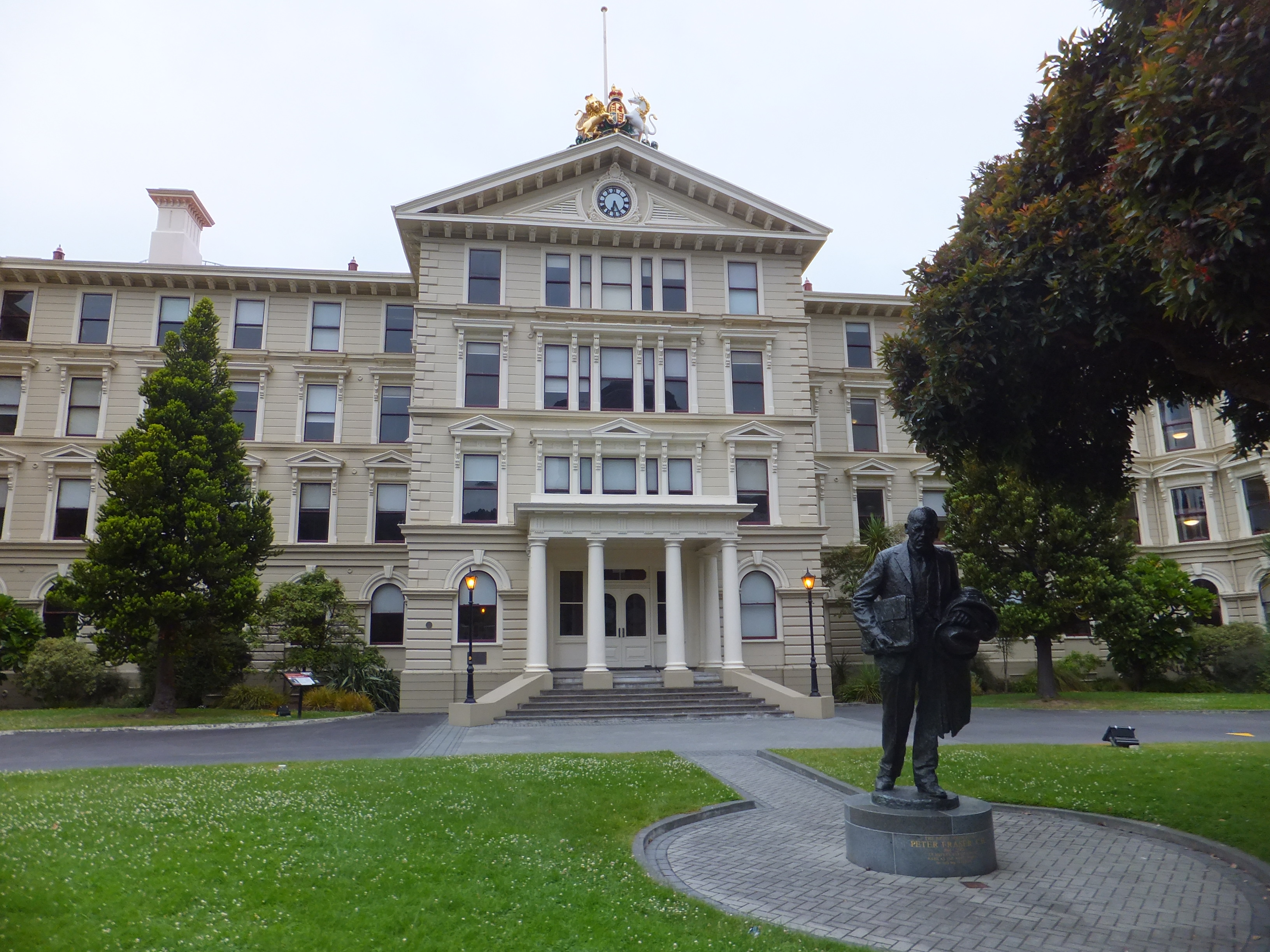
Victoria University of Wellington's Pipitea Campus: the Faculty of Law

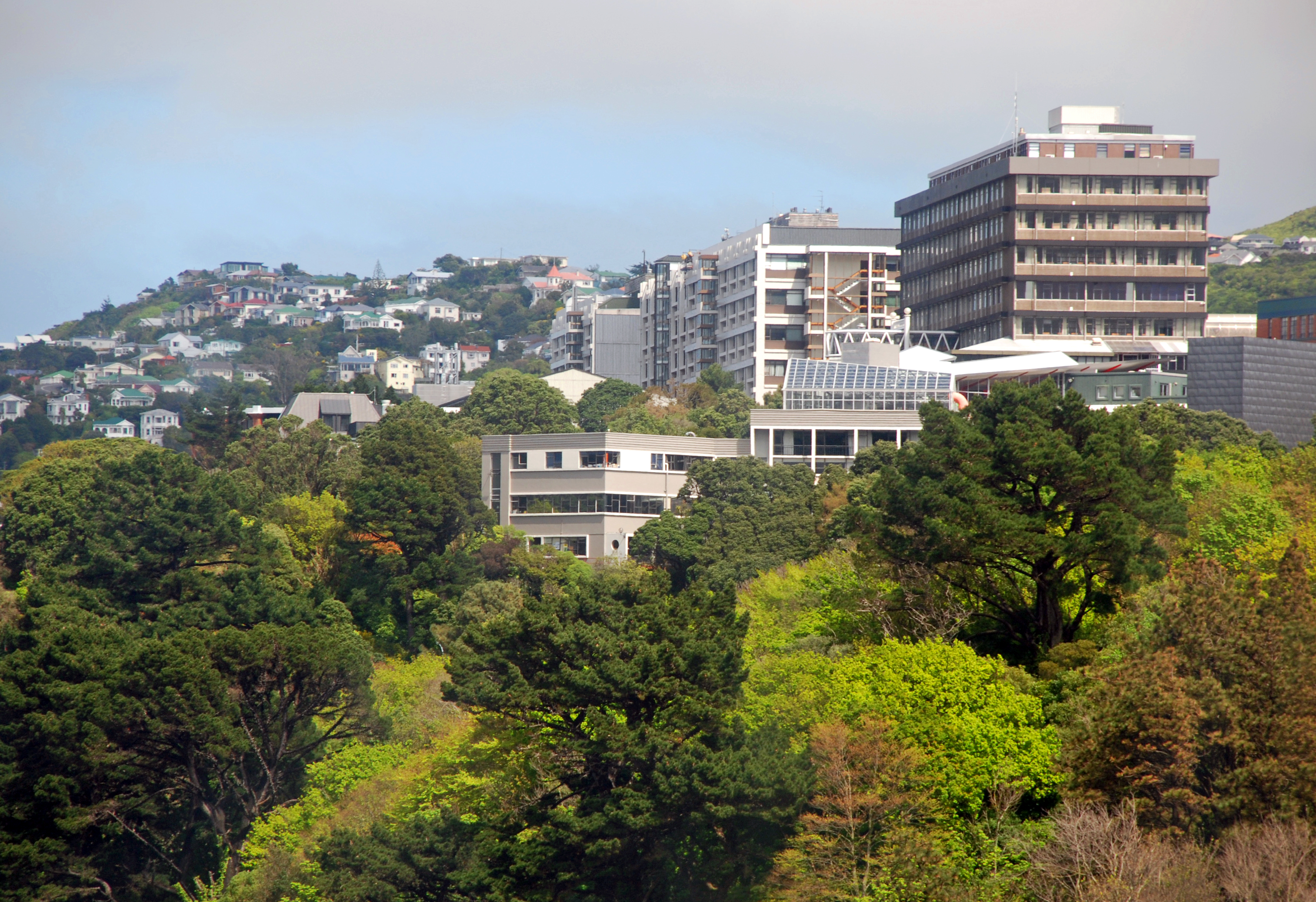
Victoria University of Wellington's Kelburn Campus

Victoria University of Wellington has three campuses spread out over Wellington city. It also has premises in Auckland.

=== Wellington ===
The main campus is in the suburb of Kelburn, overlooking the Wellington Central business district, where the Faculties of Humanities and Social Sciences, Science, Engineering, Education and Health are based. Additionally, it is the location of the university's central library and the site of its administrative offices. The campus has a range of amenities including cafés, a pharmacy and health services, childcare facilities, and a sports and recreation centre. The university book store VicBooks closed in 2023 after trading for 48 years. The Victoria University of Wellington Students' Association is based in Kelburn.

The Pipitea campus is located near the New Zealand Parliament Buildings and consists of the Wellington School of Business and Government, which includes the School of Accounting and Commercial Law, School of Economics and Finance, School of Government, School of Information Management, School of Management, School of Marketing and International Business, and the Faculty of Law. The campus consists of Rutherford House, the Old Government Buildings and the west wing of Wellington railway station. It is the location of the Commerce and Law libraries. Student services available at Pipitea campus include student health and well-being, and a recreation centre.

The Wellington Faculty of Architecture and Design Innovation is located at the Te Aro Campus. The campus contains an Architecture and Design library.

=== Auckland ===
The School of Business and Government offers selected courses at the Auckland premises, which is located in the Auckland CBD.

=== Other facilities ===
The Victoria University Coastal Ecology Laboratory supports research programmes in marine biology and coastal ecology on Wellington's rugged south coast.

The Miramar Creative Centre is located by the Wētā Workshop buildings on Park Road, Miramar. The centre offers access to work experience and connections with New Zealand's film, animation and game design industries.

=== Library ===
The library was established in 1899. The collections are dispersed over four locations: Kelburn Library, Law Library, Architecture and Design Library and Commerce Library. The library also has a collection of digital resources and full text material online. In addition to electronic resources, printed books and journals, the Library also acquires works in microform, sound recordings, videos and other media consistent with the university's academic programme needs.

The library holds approximately 1.3 million printed volumes. It provides access to 70,000 print and electronic periodical titles and 200,000 e-books. It is an official Depository Library (DL-296) of the United Nations System (DEPOLIB), one of only three in the country. The J. C. Beaglehole Room is the official repository of all archival and manuscript material, and provides a supervised research service for access to rare books, fine or fragile print items, and 'last resort' copies of university publications.

The New Zealand Electronic Text Centre (NZETC) is a digital library of significant New Zealand and Pacific Island texts and materials, arranged according to the Library of Congress classification system. The library has two online repositories: the ResearchArchive is its open research repository, which makes the university's research freely available online and the RestrictedArchive, which is the university's private research repository and is accessible only to Victoria University staff and students.

=== Campus developments ===
==== Te Huanui and 320 The Terrace ====
In September 2014, the university announced that it would purchase the abandoned Gordon Wilson Flats from Housing New Zealand. It was subsequently revealed that the purchase price was over NZ$6 million. The university bought the site due to its close proximity to the Kelburn campus, with the potential to create a link between Ghuznee St and the Terrace to the campus.

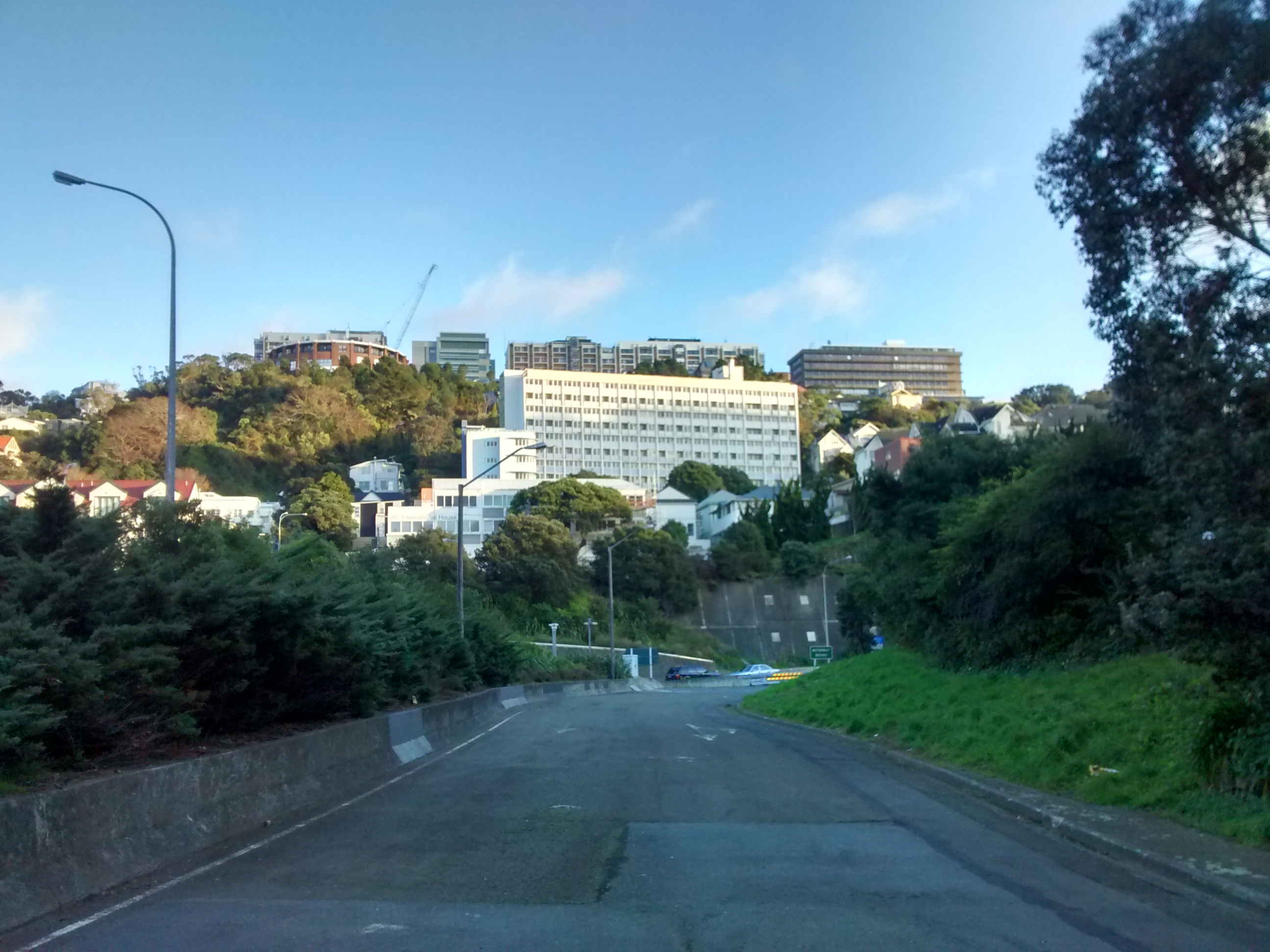
The Gordon Wilson Flats, with Victoria University of Wellington's Kelburn Campus visible on the hill above

In July 2015, Urban Perspectives Limited, on behalf of Victoria University, lodged an application with Wellington City Council to rezone the area from 'Inner Residential Area' to 'Institutional Precinct', remove the flats from the City District Plan's heritage list, and amend the Institutional Precinct provisions of the District Plan. Residents supported the removal of the flats from the area, as it was a significant case of urban decay in the area, while various groups such as the Wellington Architectural Centre opposed the demolition of the flats, noting their architectural significance.

The Gordon Wilson Flats have exceptional architectural significance. Not only are they associated with F. Gordon Wilson, one of the most prominent, powerful and influential architects in New Zealand from the 1930s through to the 1950s but they are the last of a line of highly important high rise social housing projects built by the state. They were initiated by the first Labour Government of 1935 and they reflect and have a direct connection with international modernism.

This issue bought up wider debate on whether it was worth retaining mid-century public housing for heritage purposes, when the building in question had itself paid scant value towards the past.

In April 2016, a Wellington City Council panel approved the rezoning of the flats, allowing Victoria University to demolish the building. However, in July 2016, the Architectural Centre lodged an appeal in the Environment Court against the Wellington City Council's decision to remove the Gordon Wilson flats' heritage status under Wellington's District Plan. The appeal was successful, with the court determining that the heritage listing should stand in August 2017.

In 2018, Victoria University students Jessie Rogers and Hannah Rushton mapped the building using Lidar mapping technology. This data was used to create a computer generated model of the flats, allowing them to be explored in a virtual reality environment. This virtual reality experience was then displayed at an exhibition named Immersive Legacies: 320 The Terrace, at the Wellington Museum, allowing users to see information about the building, the building in its prime state, and the current deterioration of the structure.

In July 2020, Victoria University unveiled plans for what they called 'Te Huanui'. The plan showed that the university could be rezoning the site for institutional use, demolishing the Gordon Wilson Flats, while retaining the nearby McLeans Flats. The area would then be used to create a gateway between the hilltop Kelburn campus and the city below, including an outdoor plaza and new teaching and research facilities. The development would also create a pedestrian and elevator link up to the Kelburn campus.

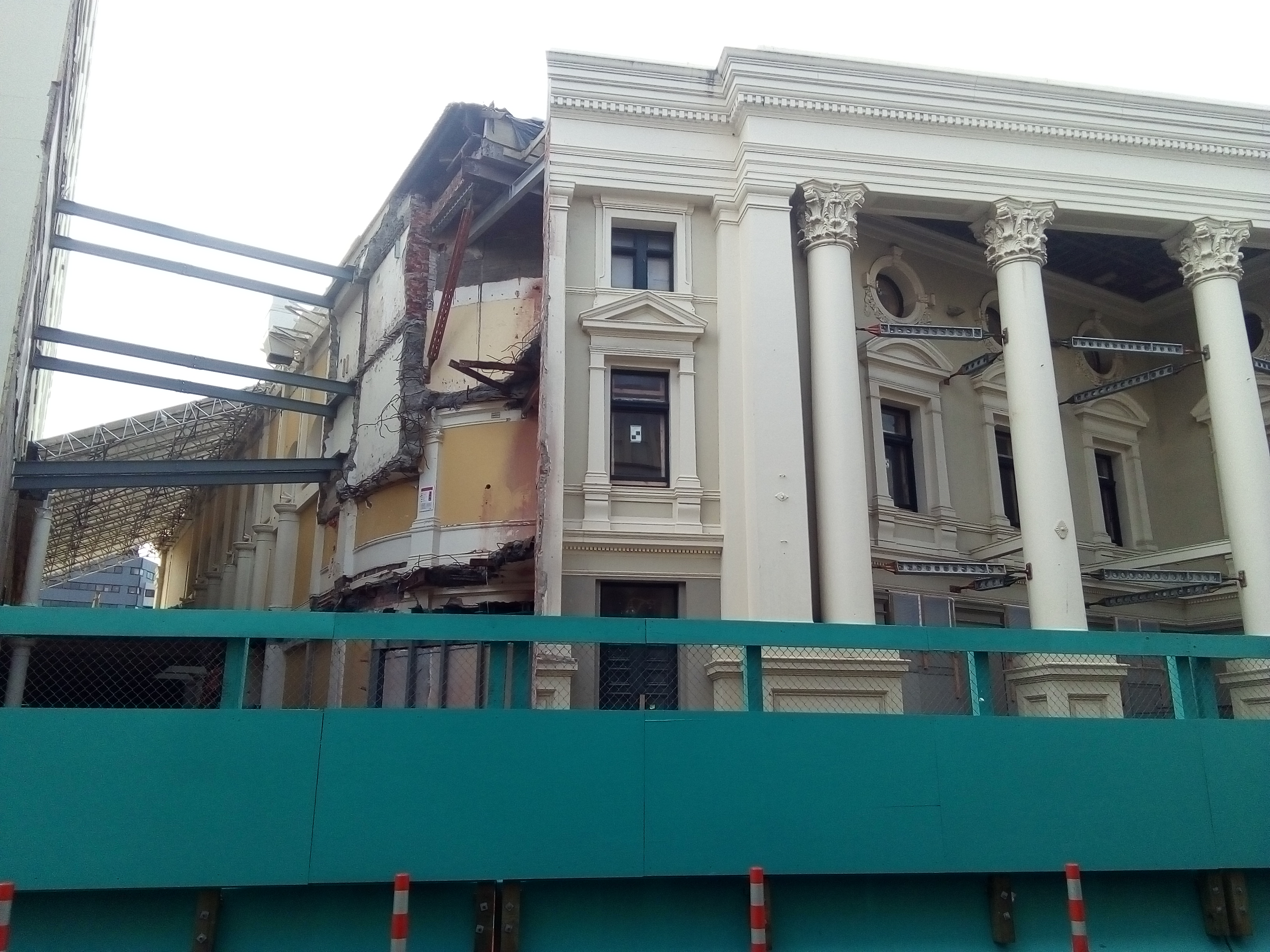
Renovation work commencing on Wellington Town Hall

==== National Centre for Music ====
Victoria University owns the New Zealand School of Music. In 2019, Victoria University, on behalf of the New Zealand School of Music, signed an agreement with Wellington City Council and the New Zealand Symphony Orchestra to establish a new National Music Centre based in Wellington Town Hall. This would be established once refurbishment work on the town hall had been completed.

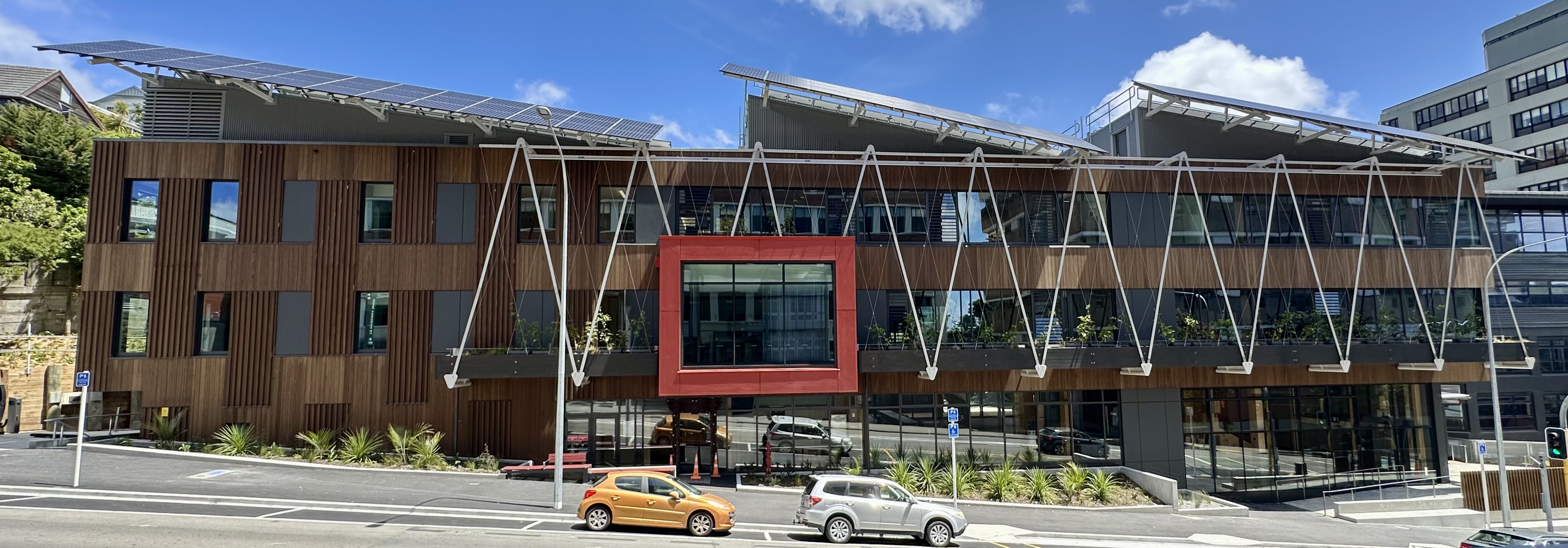
Ngā Mokopuna, Kelburn Parade

==== Ngā Mokopuna ====
Ngā Mokopuna (formerly known as The Living Pā) was a redevelopment of the marae and surrounding area of the Kelburn campus. It involved the removal of five buildings from 42 to 50 Kelburn Parade and the creation of a new building employing principles based on the Living Building Challenge. Preparatory work began in mid 2021, starting with the clearance and demolition of existing buildings on the construction site.

The building, designed by Tennent Brown Architects, with art from David Hakaraia, was opened in a ceremony late 2024. Ngā Mokopuna is one of under 30 buildings certified as a living building by the International Living Future Institute.

== Organisation and administration ==
From 1938 to 1957, the head of administration was the principal. Since 1957, the head of administration has been the vice-chancellor. The following people have held the role of principal and/or vice-chancellor:

- Tommy Hunter, 1938–1951
- Jim Williams, 1951–1968
- Danny Taylor, 1968–1982
- Ian Axford, 1982–1985
- Les Holborow, 1986–1998
- Michael Irving, 1998–2000
- Stuart McCutcheon, 2000–2004
- Pat Walsh, 2005–2014
- Grant Guilford, 2014–2022
- Nic Smith, 2023–2026
- Bryony James, 2026-

Day-to-day governance is in the hands of the University Council, which consists of 20 people: four elected by the Court of Convocation, three elected by the academic staff, one elected by the general staff, two appointed by the student union executive, four appointed by the Minister of Education, four selected by the Council itself, and the vice-chancellor. The Court of Convocation is composed of all graduates who choose to participate. Charles Wilson, at the time the chief librarian of the Parliamentary Library, was a member of the original council and its chairman for two years.

=== Faculties ===
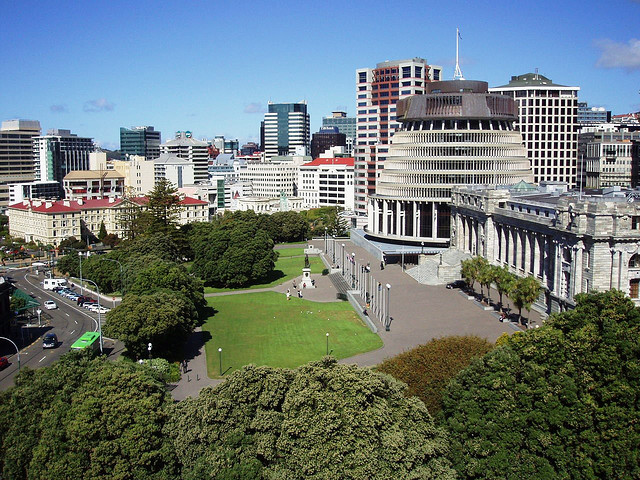
Faculty of Law on the left, Houses of Parliament on the right

A reorganisation of several university faculties was approved in October 2024. Since then, the faculties are:

- Faculty of Architecture and Design Innovation
- Faculty of Business and Government
- Faculty of Education, Health, and Psychological Sciences
- Faculty of Graduate Research
- Faculty of Humanities and Social Sciences
- Faculty of Law
- Faculty of Science and Engineering

The School of Māori Studies is unique in that since October 2024 it does not belong to any faculty, but rather to Iho Māori under the portfolio of the Deputy Vice-Chancellor (Māori).

=== Research centres and institutes ===
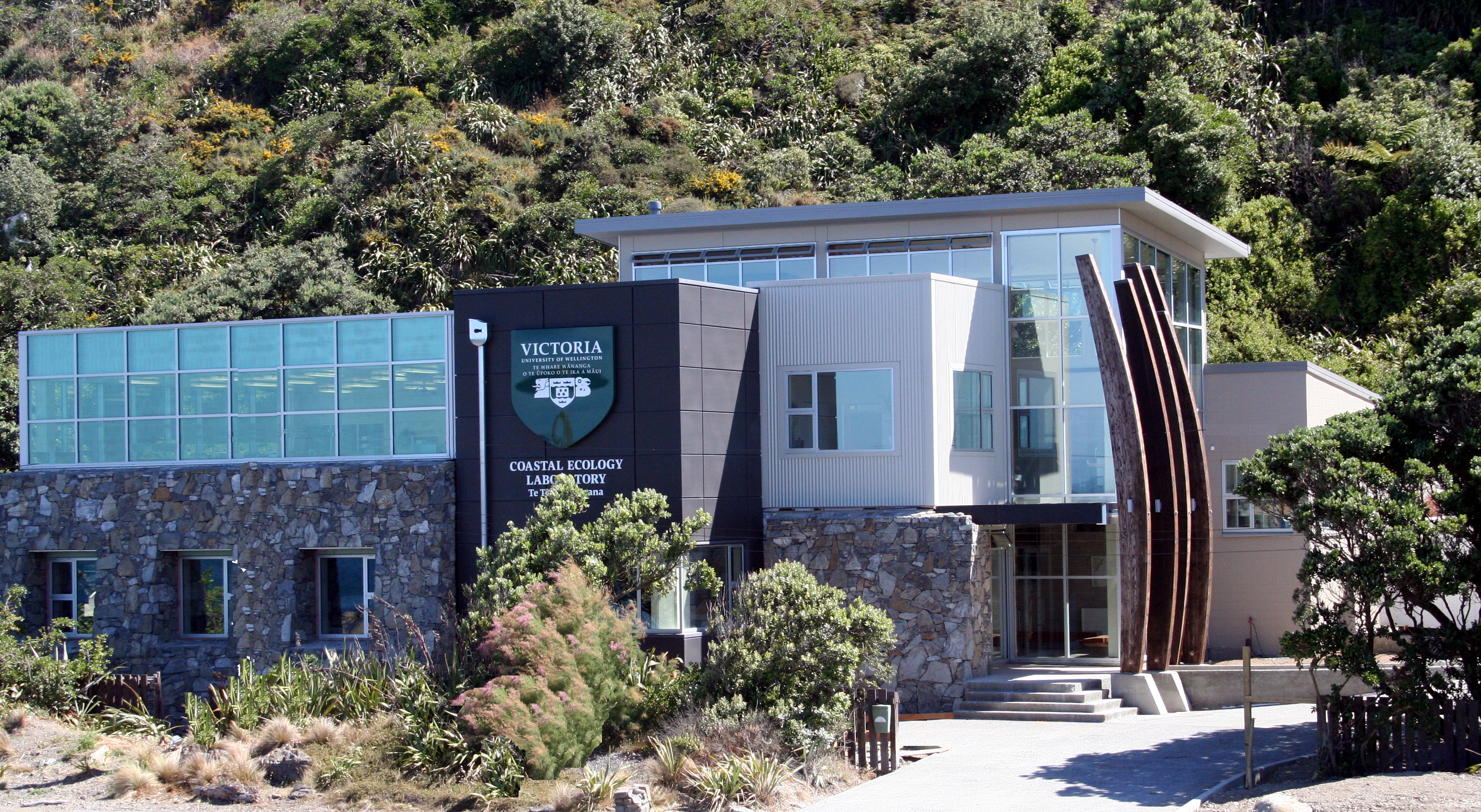
Victoria University Coastal Ecology Laboratory

Victoria has more than 40 research centres and institutes, including

- MacDiarmid Institute for Advanced Materials and Nanotechnology
- Robinson Research Institute
- Ferrier Research Institute
- Malaghan Institute of Medical Research
- Victoria University Coastal Ecology Laboratory
- Centre for Strategic Studies New Zealand
- Adam Art Gallery
- Antarctic Research Centre
- International Institute of Modern Letters
- New Zealand India Research Institute
- Language Learning Centre (defunct)

== Academic profile ==
=== Academic reputation ===
University rankings

Global – Overall
- ARWU World: 401–500 (2025)
- CWTS World: 782 (Note: The CWTS Leiden Ranking is based on P (top 10%).) (2024)
- QS World: =240 (2026)
- QS Employability: 251–300 (2022)
- THE World: 401–500 (2026)
- USNWR Global: =506 (25/26)

National – Overall
- ARWU National: 2–4 (2025)
- CWTS National: 5 (2024)
- QS National: 4 (2026)
- THE National: 3–4 (2026)
- USNWR National: 3 (25/26)

The university typically ranks around positions 200–500 globally, and 3–4 nationally, in 2021 the Faculty of Law was rated 65th in the world by QS World University Rankings. In 2024 the Aggregate Ranking of Top Universities, which measures aggregate performance across the QS, THE and ARWU rankings, gave it a position of #244 (3rd nationally), and by CWTS Leiden Ranking a position of #782 (5th nationally). It was ranked in 2025 #401–500 (tied 2–4th nationally) by Academic Ranking of World Universities, and in the 2025–2026 U.S. News & World Report Best Global Universities a tied position of #506 (3rd nationally). In 2026 Quacquarelli Symonds World University Rankings and Times Higher Education World University Rankings 2026 (both published 2025), the university attained a positions of tied #240 (4th nationally) and #401–500 (tied 3–4th nationally) respectively.

== Student life ==
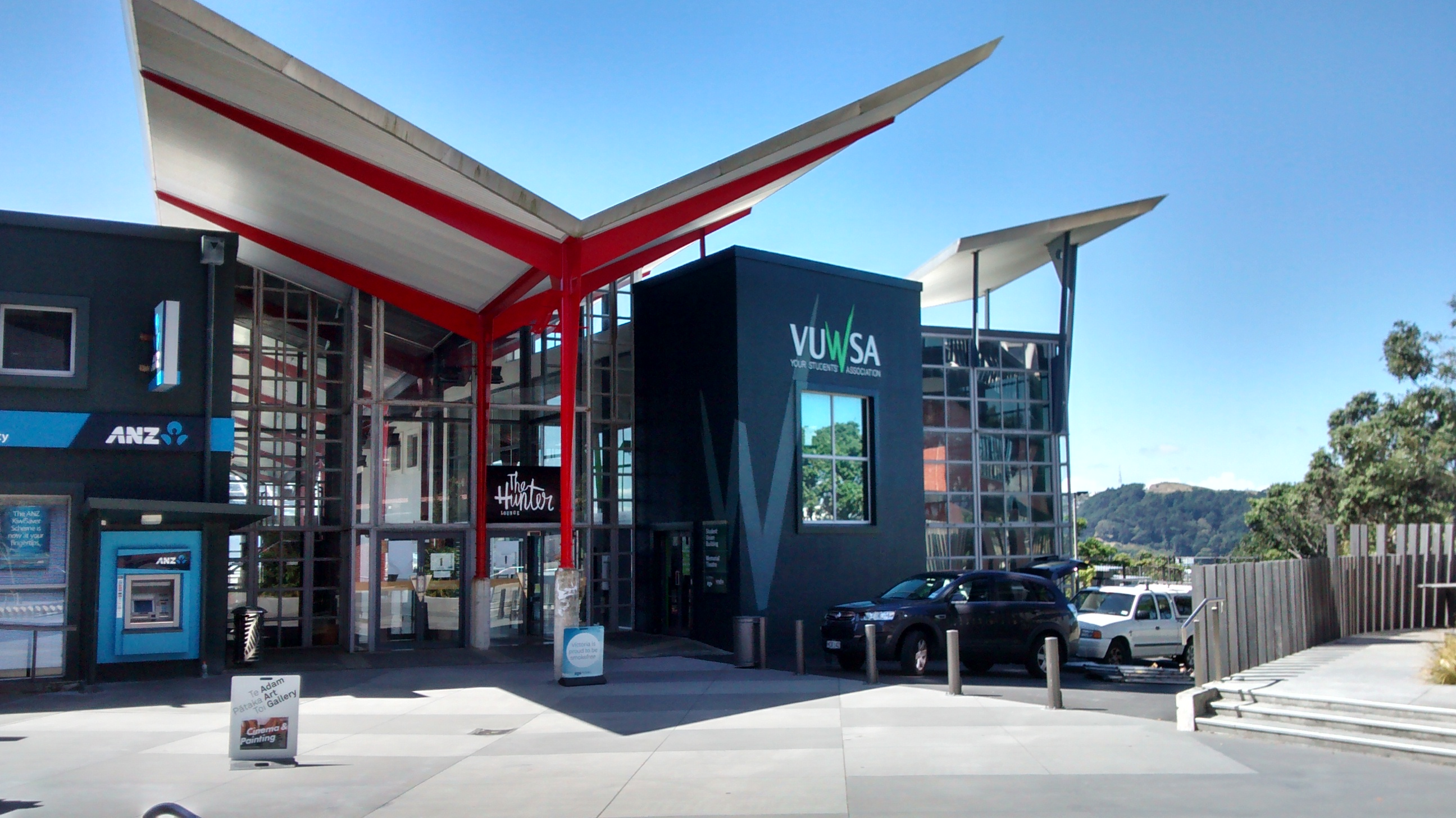
Offices of the Victoria University of Wellington Students' Association

=== Students' associations and student media ===
- Victoria University of Wellington Students' Association (VUWSA)
- Salient (student media)

=== Halls of residence ===
Victoria operated

- 222 Willis Apartments (self-catered)
- Boulcott Hall (catered)
- Capital Hall (catered)
- Joan Stevens Hall (catered)
- Katharine Jermyn Hall (catered)
- Te Puni Village (catered)
- Weir House (catered)
- Willis St: Cumberland House (catered)
- Willis St: Education House (self-catered)
- University Hall (self-catered)
- University Hall: Whānau House (self-catered)

Privately operated

- Victoria House (catered)
- Everton Hall (self-catered)

== Controversies ==
In 2010, Victoria University of Wellington was criticised by feminist Sandra Coney and others for removing the Gender Studies department. In 2017, a minor in Gender Studies was made available.

In 2012 a Facebook page that is associated with Victoria University of Wellington students, Overheard @ Vic, was in the media for the many rape comments that were made. These included comments like "you've got to rape the paper, man, you can't let the paper rape you" and "at least ugly girls don't get raped". In response to this, a spokesperson for Victoria University of Wellington said that "student safety was a key focus, and the university had partnered with police and Wellington City Council to promote awareness of personal safety".

In late 2015, academics and students at Victoria University of Wellington spoke out at the university hosting Israeli Defence Force troops for a public lecture. The opposition for this public lecture came about because of the soldiers' involvement in Operation Protective Edge, which is thought to have killed at least 2000 Palestinians, most of them civilians.

In October 2016 students protested the cut of several European languages, including the German language department losing 43% of its staff. Also in 2016, Victoria University of Wellington was embroiled in a row with the Tertiary Education Union, when it was discovered that union members were being paid less than non-union members. This led the TEU to characterise the vice-chancellor Grant Guilford as being anti-union, and resulted in a one-day strike.

In April 2020, during the COVID-19 outbreak, the university came under fire from students, politicians, and media for suddenly announcing at 48 hours notice that they would be charging students a "placeholder fee" ($150 per week) for student accommodation that they had been forcibly removed from, despite emails from the university previously telling those same students that they would not have to pay.

== Notable academics and staff ==
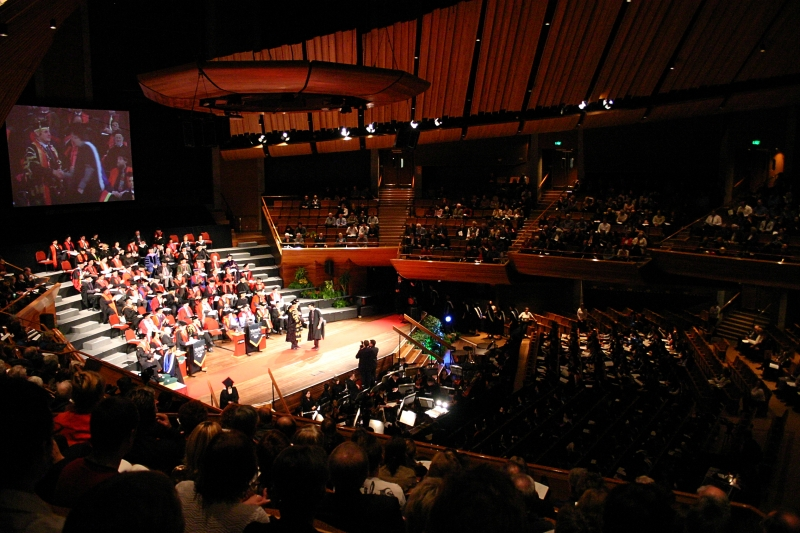
Graduation ceremony

- Bill Alington, architect
- James Belich, historian
- Doreen Blumhardt, education academic
- Jonathan Boston, public policy academic
- Mai Chen, public law lawyer
- Paul Callaghan, physical sciences academic
- Margaret Clark, political science academic
- Sally Davenport, management academic
- Lloyd Geering, religious studies academic
- Bill Hastings, chief censor and judge
- Robert Walker Hay FRSE, chemist
- Frank Holmes, economics academic
- George Edward Hughes, philosophy academic
- Simon Keller, philosophy academic
- Joanna Kidman, sociologist
- Allison Kirkman, sociologist
- Wendy Larner, social scientist, Provost
- Douglas Lilburn, music academic
- Richard Cockburn Maclaurin, mathematics academic
- Bill Manhire, author and poet
- Douglas Mews, academic and early keyboard specialist
- Paul Morris, religious studies academic
- Peter Munz, history academic
- Terence O'Brien, diplomat and academic
- Tipene O'Regan, Māori leader and education academic
- Vincent O'Sullivan, academic and poet
- Geoffrey Palmer, politician
- Matthew Palmer, law academic
- Pat Ralph, marine biologist; first woman at Victoria to be awarded a DSc
- Prof. James Renwick, climate scientist and science communicator
- Ivor Richardson, lawyer and academic
- Nigel Roberts, political science academic
- Claudia Scott, public policy academic
- Kim Sterelny, philosophy academic
- Teresia Teaiwa, Pacific studies academic, author, poet
- Helen Tippett, architecture academic, architect
- Matt Visser, specialist in general relativity
- Colleen Ward, cross-cultural psychologist academic
- Colin J. N. Wilson, volcanology academic
- Whatarangi Winiata, Māori leader and Professor of Accountancy
- John Chapman Andrew, foundation Vice Chancellor
- Warwick Murray, geography and development studies academic, musician
- Nicholas Agar, philosophy academic

== Notable alumni ==
New Zealand Prime Ministers who attended Victoria University of Wellington

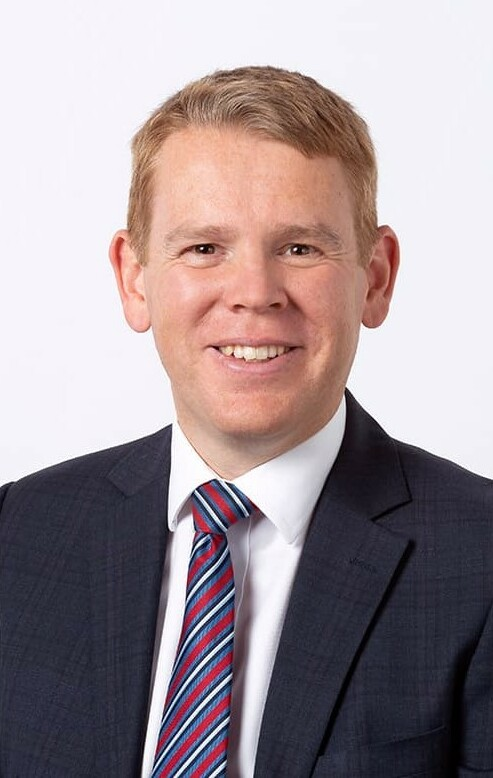
Chris Hipkins

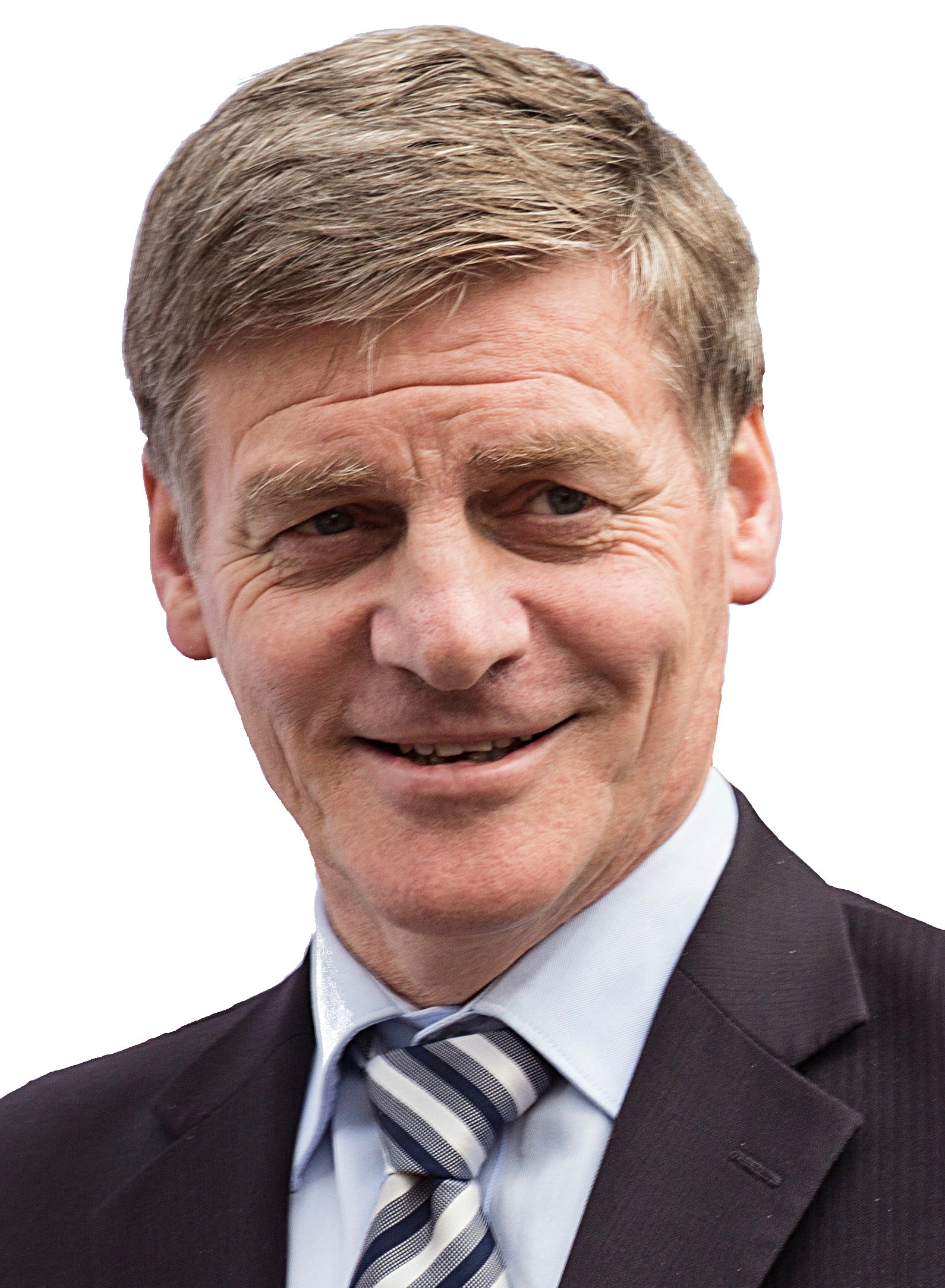
Bill English

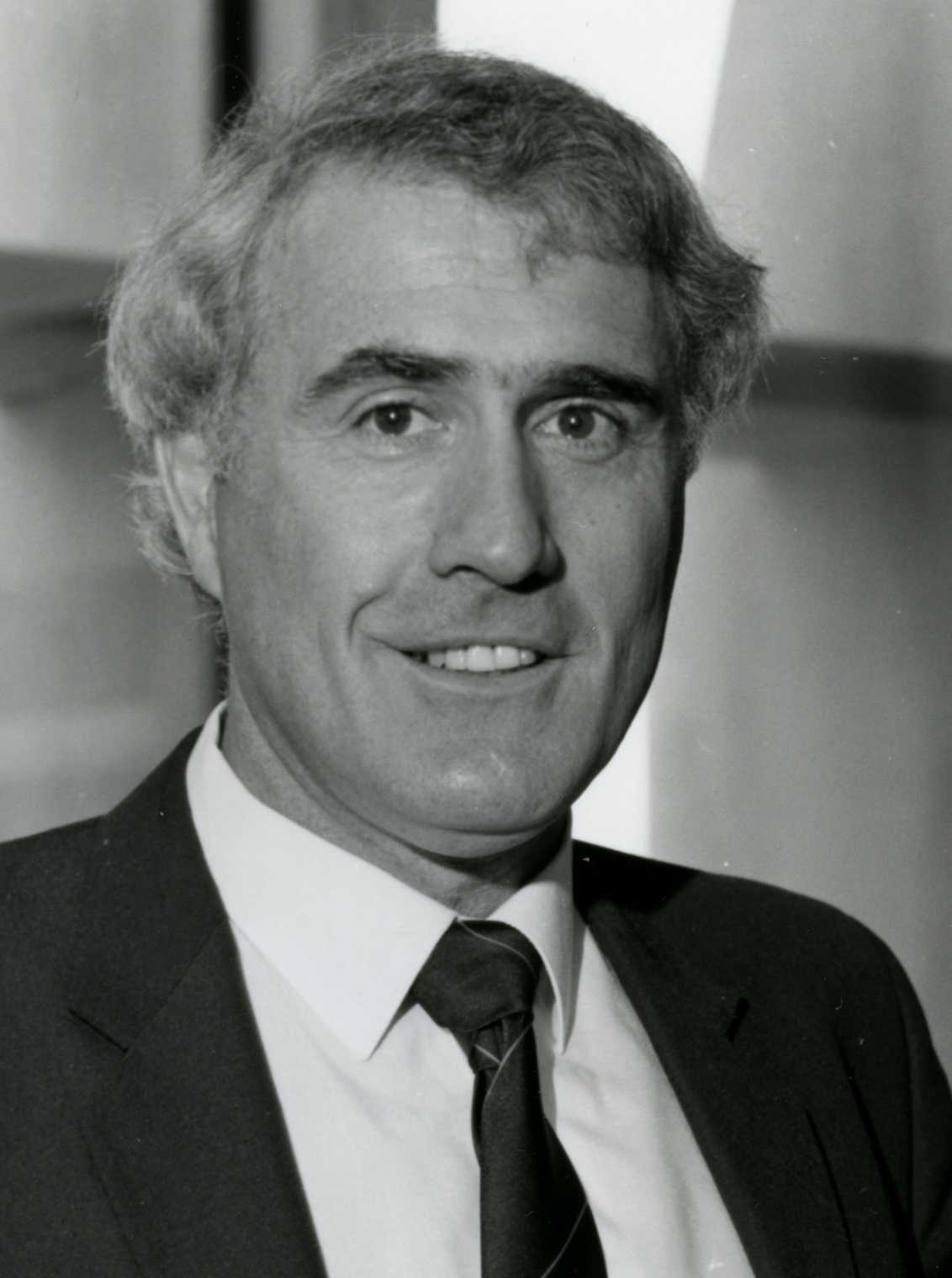
Geoffrey Palmer

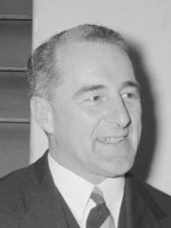
Jack Marshall

- Fleur Adcock, (MA) poet, Queen's Gold Medal for Poetry recipient
- Barbara Anderson, (BA) author, poet
- Michelle Ang, (BCA, BSc) actor
- Sir Brian Barratt-Boyes, (BSc) cardiologist
- Gankhuurai Battungalag, Mongolian diplomat
- Dr John Cawte Beaglehole, (BA, MA) Captain Cook expert, OM recipient
- Harry J. Benda, (BA, MA) Czech-American Southeast Asianist
- Teresa Bergman, (BA) singer-songwriter
- Hera Lindsay Bird (MA (Poetry))
- Sir Michael Hardie Boys, (BA, LLB) former Governor-General of New Zealand
- Sarah Billinghurst, (BA) artistic director Metropolitan Opera
- Dr Robert Burchfield, (BA) lexicographic scholar
- Alistair Te Ariki Campbell, (BA, DipT) poet, novelist
- John Campbell, (BA(Hons)) New Zealand television personality
- Philippa Campbell, (BA) New Zealand film and television producer and theatre development executive
- Jane Campion, (BA) Oscar and Palme D'Or winning director/screenwriter
- Chea Serey, Director General of the National Bank of Cambodia
- Dr Helen Elizabeth Shearburn Clark (Rotman), Marine zoologist.
- John Clarke, (Honorary Doctor of Letters) creator of Fred Dagg
- Jemaine Clement, Flight of the Conchords
- Nellie Euphemia Coad, (MA) teacher, community leader, author
- Baron Cooke of Thorndon, (LLB, LLM) former Law Lord
- Frank Corner, (MA, Honorary Doctor of Laws) New Zealand diplomat, public servant
- Andrew Digby, (PhD) Astronomer and ecologist, working in conservation of New Zealand's endemic birds
- Sir Thomas Eichelbaum, (LLB) former Chief Justice of New Zealand
- Sir Randal Elliott, (BSc) social campaigner, surgeon
- Bill English, (BA(Hons)), former Prime Minister of New Zealand
- Edith Farkas (1921–1993), Hungarian-born New Zealand meteorologist who measured ozone levels
- Gareth Farr, (BMus(Hons)) Composer, Percussionist
- Sir Michael Fay, (LLB) merchant banker, top-10 richest New Zealanders
- John Feeney, documentary filmmaker, nominated for two Academy Awards
- Chris Finlayson, (BA, LLM) Attorney-General, MP
- Dr Alexander Gerst, (MSc) German ESA astronaut
- Patricia Grace, (DipTchg, Honorary Doctor of Literature) author
- Paul A. Griffin, Distinguished Professor Emeritus at the Graduate School of Management, University of California, Davis
- Prof Harry Hawthorn, (BA) NZ-Born Canadian anthropologist
- Hon. Georgina te Heuheu, (BA, LLB) MP
- Dr Fred Hollows, (BA) NZ-Born eye surgeon
- Don Hunn, (MA) State Services Commissioner
- Sir Jack Hunn, (LLM) New Zealand public servant
- Chris Hipkins, (BA) 41st Prime Minister of New Zealand
- Prof Witi Ihimaera, (BA, Honorary Doctor of Literature) author of Whale Rider
- Moana Jackson, (BA LLB) Māori lawyer specialising in Treaty of Waitangi and constitutional issues
- Anthony Jennings, (B Mus) harpsichordist, organist, choral and orchestral director, and academic
- Sir Robert Jones, (BA) property tycoon
- Lloyd Jones, (BA) author, Commonwealth Writers' Prize recipient
- Sir Kenneth Keith, (LLM, Honorary Doctor of Laws) international jurist
- Roger Kerr, Executive director of New Zealand Business Roundtable
- Chong Kah Kiat, (LLB, LLM (Hons)) Former Chief Minister of Sabah state
- Hon. Sir Doug Kidd, (LLB) former Speaker of the New Zealand House of Representatives
- Dr Michael King, (BA, DLitt) historian
- Chris Kraus, (BA) American writer
- Sir George Laking, (LLB) New Zealand diplomat, public servant
- Sarah Leberman, Sport management academic
- Melanie Lynskey, Actress
- Dianne Macaskill, Chief Archivist
- Douglas R. MacFarlane (BSc), Chemist, researcher and author
- Prof Alan MacDiarmid, (BSc, MSc, Honorary Doctor of Science) winner of the Nobel Prize in Chemistry 2000
- Sabine Marcelis, Artist and designer
- Sir Jack Marshall, (BA, LLB) former Prime Minister
- Melissa Cristina Márquez, "Mother of Sharks", marine biologist, and science communicator
- James Jemut Masing, (BA) former Deputy Chief Minister of Sarawak
- Fiamē Naomi Mataʻafa, 7th Prime Minister of Samoa
- Sir Thaddeus McCarthy, (LLM) Court of Appeal judge
- Sir Alister McIntosh, (MA) New Zealand public servant
- Bret McKenzie, Flight of the Conchords
- Dr John Money, (BSc) sexologist
- Dr Mary Morgan-Richards, (PhD) evolutionary biologist, professor at Massey University
- Sam Neill, (BA) actor
- W. H. Oliver, (MA) historian, poet, writer
- Teima Onorio, (BA) Vice President of Kiribati
- Simon O'Neill, M.Mus, (BMus(Hons), Honorary Doctor of Music) International Opera Singer
- Lorae Parry, (MA) Playwright and Actress
- Mark Paston (BSc) All Whites goalkeeper for the 2010 Fifa World Cup
- Tamatha Paul, (BA) Member of Parliament for Wellington Central
- Sir Guy Powles, (LLB) New Zealand diplomat, first Ombudsman
- Dr Christopher Pugsley, military historian
- Maraea Rakuraku, (MA) writer
- Beverley Randell, (BA, TTC) author
- Sir Paul Reeves, (BA, MA) former Governor-General of New Zealand and Archbishop and Primate of New Zealand
- Dr Natalie Robinson, polar oceanographer
- Dr Jonathan Sarfati, (BSc(Hons), PhD) creationist author, New Zealand Chess Champion
- Tuiloma Neroni Slade (LL.B.), Secretary General of the Pacific Islands Forum
- Conrad Smith, (LLB(Hons)) All Black 2004–2015
- Jacqueline Sturm, (BA, MA, Honorary Doctor of Literature) wife of the late James K. Baxter
- Dr Bill Sutch, (BCA, MA) public servant, suspected spy
- Leslie Denis Swindale, soil scientist and Padma Bhushan awardee
- Sir Ronald Syme, (MA) classicist historian, OM recipient
- Sir Brian Talboys, (BA) former Deputy Prime Minister
- Peter Dengate Thrush (BSc, LLB) Chairman of ICANN
- Viran Molisa Trief, first female Solicitor-General and Supreme Court judge of Vanuatu
- Taika Waititi, (BA) Filmmaker, writer, and actor
- Fran Walsh, (BA, Honorary Doctor of Literature) multiple Oscar winner, wife of film director Peter Jackson
- Dr Marilyn Waring, (BA(Hons)) feminist, former MP, Professor at AUT
- Clement Gordon Watson, (MA) editor, journalist, soldier, communist activist
- Albert Wendt, (MA) author, Samoan poet
- Sir Maarten Wevers, diplomat and civil servant, former Chief Executive of the Department of the Prime Minister and Cabinet
- Dame Gillian Whitehead, (BMus(Hons), Honorary Doctor of Music) New Zealand composer
- Sir Richard Wild, (LLM) former Chief Justice of New Zealand
- Thomas Stafford Williams, (BCA), fifth Archbishop of Wellington, cardinal
- Nicola Willis, (BA(Hons)), MP
- Simon Wilson, (BA) editor of Metro
- Dan Wootton, (BA) journalist and broadcaster
- Alison Wright, (BA) New Zealand athlete and record holder
- Martin Wylie, CEO of Slingshot
- Jack Yan, (LLB, BCA(Hons), MCA) businessman, publisher, Good Morning panellist
- John Stuart Yeates, (PhD (Botany)) academic, founding staff member of Massey University

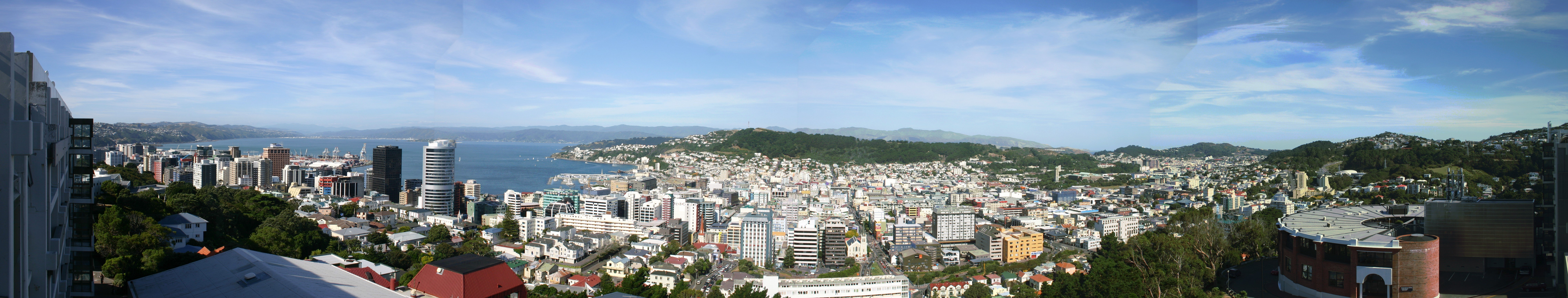
Panorama of the view from the fifth floor stairwell of the Cotton Building, Kelburn campus

== See also ==
- Tertiary education in New Zealand
