= Language Learning Centre =

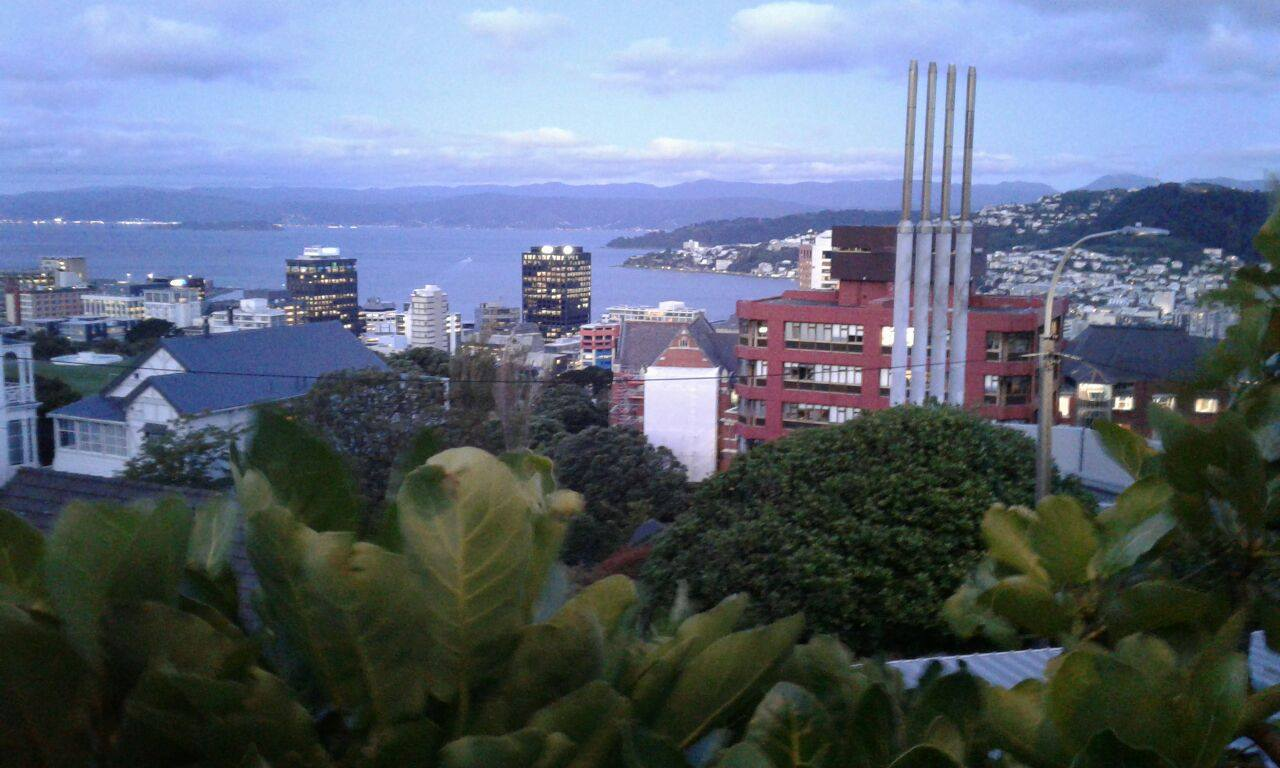
The Language Learning Centre was located on level 0 of the von Zedlitz building, the red-coloured tower block on Victoria University of Wellington's Kelburn campus.

The Language Learning Centre (in Māori: Te Pūtahi Reo) was a self-access language learning centre that offered resources and facilities for those learning languages at Victoria University of Wellington.

== Facilities ==
Once occupying the whole of the von Zedlitz building, the Centre comprised language laboratories, themed group study rooms, a computer suite as well as a self-access library that includes graded readers, films, self-study courses, textbooks and board games for all ten languages taught at Victoria (English, Māori, New Zealand Sign Language, French, Chinese, German, Italian, Japanese, Samoan and Spanish) as well as dozens of others. Recognising a lack of language learning resources for many Pacific languages it worked with local native speakers to launch an online platform for languages such as Māori, Samoan and Cook Islands Māori. The language laboratories within the Centre were equipped for teaching New Zealand Sign Language in addition to spoken languages.

== Language Buddy Programme ==
The Centre ran a Tandem Language Learning programme which allows students to work with a native speaker of their target language improving their conversation skills as well as learn about their counterpart's culture.

== History ==
The first language laboratory was established at 30 Kelburn Parade in 1967 by the then French Department. In 1974 a language laboratory component was formally introduced into the French programme in order to expose students to authentic materials. In 1989 the university's English Language Institute began placing a greater importance on independent language learning through what was then called the Self Access Centre, a key facility for its English Proficiency Programme (EPP). This later became known as the Language Learning Centre (LLC) and expanded to cater for students of other languages taught at Victoria as well as non-taught languages.
