= Victoria University Coastal Ecology Laboratory =

New Zealand research facility

Coordinates: 41.3479°S 174.7648°E

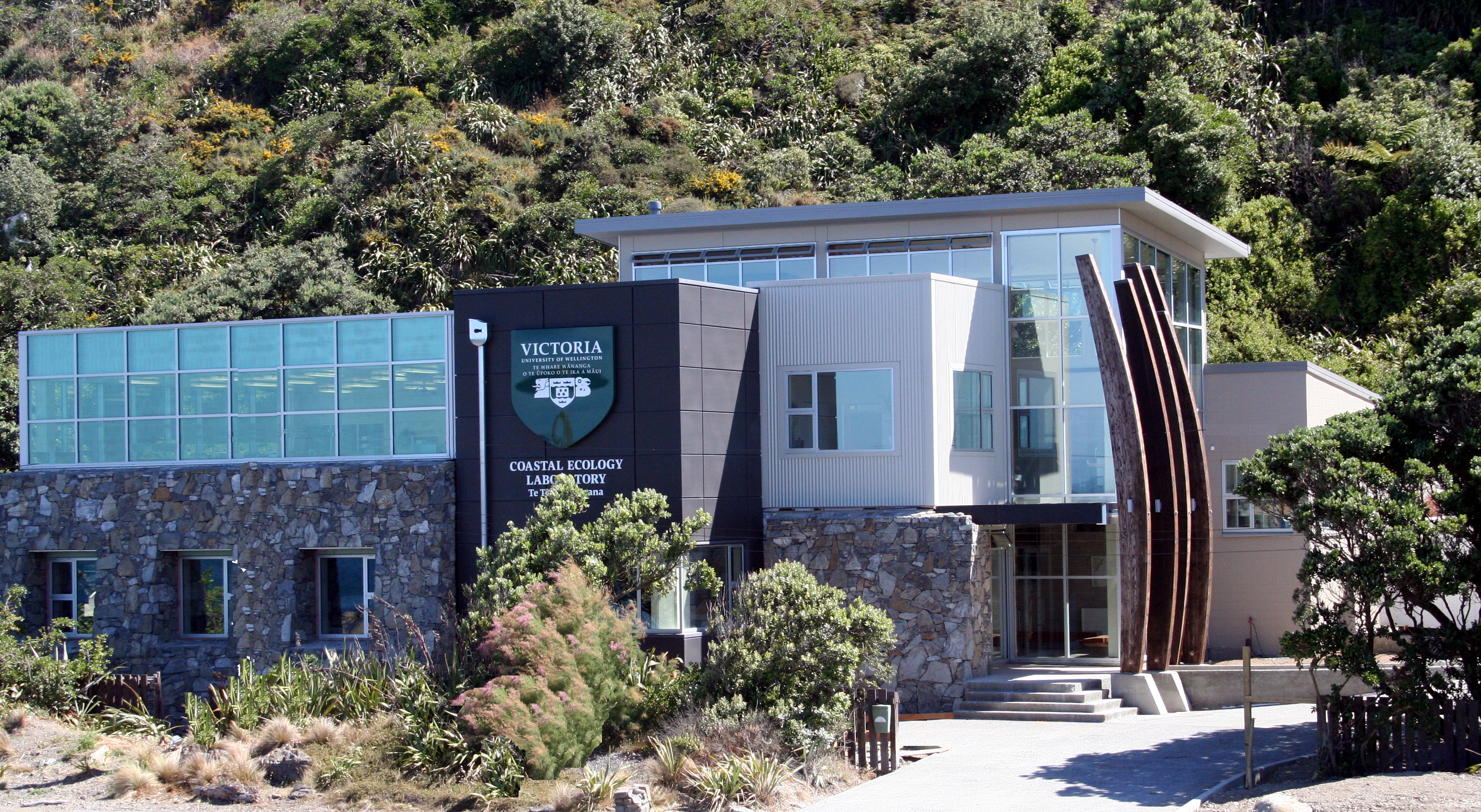
The Victoria University Coastal Ecology Laboratory, on the south coast of Wellington, New Zealand

The Victoria University Coastal Ecology Laboratory (VUCEL) is a research facility of the School of Biological Sciences at Victoria University of Wellington that supports research in coastal ecology and marine biology. Located at the southern end of the North Island of New Zealand, in Island Bay on Wellington's south coast, approximately 8 km south of the university's main campus, the laboratory overlooks Cook Strait and the exposed rocky reef systems of the Taputeranga Marine Reserve.

VUCEL is known in Māori as Te Toka Tū Moana, which means "the surf-beaten rock that stands firm in the ocean". The Māori name is both a description of the VUCEL building (with natural design elements that give it the appearance of rising from the rocks of the Wellington south coast), and it is representative of the strong connections between land and sea that are the focus much of VUCEL-supported research.

VUCEL is a purpose-built research facility designed by Pynenburg & Collins Architects Ltd with the internal laboratory spaces designed by Labworks Architecture Ltd, the research facility was completed in early 2009 and comprises an 816 m^{2} research space that includes 113 m^{2} of science laboratories, 168 m^{2} of wet laboratory facilities supplied with filtered and unfiltered flow-through seawater, and 161 m^{2} of oceanfront office space for up to 30 VUCEL research students, academics, and support staff. VUCEL provides a staging area for field-based research programmes along the Wellington south coast and surrounding regions. The lab maintains a small fleet of research vessels and vehicles, SCUBA diving facilities, research infrastructure, and instrumentation for field-based ecological research. VUCEL provides logistic support to research programmes in coastal ecology that are conducted in the Wellington region and throughout New Zealand, the Indo-Pacific region, and Southern Ocean.

Victoria University first proposed a marine lab along the south coast of Wellington in the 1920s but it was not until the 1960s that a lab was established. This predecessor to VUCEL, known as the Island Bay Marine Lab, occupied a building that was originally constructed as a shark liver oil processing plant by the Glaxo Company. This 1950s structure supported the marine biology programme of Victoria University until 2007, when it was demolished to make way for the new purpose-built coastal ecology laboratory.

== See also ==
- Portobello Marine Laboratory
