= Allison Kirkman =

New Zealand sociology academic

Allison Margaret Kirkman is a New Zealand sociology academic with interests in 'death and dying; gender, sexuality, ageing and health; health care work and workers.' In 2014 she was appointed the Vice Provost (Academic and Equity) at Victoria University of Wellington before moving to become Pro-Vice Chancellor for the Division of Arts, Law, Psychology and Social Sciences at the University of Waikato. She was made an emeritus Professor at the University of Waikato in 2022 in recognition of her work to set up a nursing programme at the university.

Kirkman's 1996 PhD thesis was on Ways of Being Religious: Lesbians and Christianity.

== Selected publications ==
- Allison Kirkman. Health practitioners, Te Ara: The Encyclopedia of New Zealand, updated 9 November 2012
- Allison Kirkman and Pat Moloney eds. Sexuality Down Under Social and Historical Perspectives Otago University Press 2006 ISBN 1 877372 10 2
- Kevin Dew and Allison Kirkman Sociology of health in New Zealand Oxford University Press 2002. ISBN 0-195584-54-6.
