= Materials Research Innovations =

- Discipline: Materials science
- Language: English
- Edited by: S Komarneni

Publication details
- Publisher: Maney Publishing

Standard abbreviations
- ISO 4: Mater. Res. Innov.

Indexing
- ISSN: 1433-075X (print); 1432-8917 (web)

Links
- Journal homepage

Materials Research Innovations is a scientific journal published by Maney Publishing. It covers all areas of Materials Research.

== Indexing ==
The journal is indexed in :

- Scopus
