= William Kirkman =

Australian cricketer (born 1961)

Bill Kirkman
Personal information
- Full name: William Stanley Kirkman
- Born: 14 February 1961 (age 65); Launceston, Tasmania, Australia
- Batting: Right-handed
- Bowling: Right-arm medium-fast

Domestic team information
- Years: Team
- 1982/83–1986/87: Tasmania
- FC debut: 14 February 1983 Tasmania v Sri Lankans
- Last FC: 6 March 1987 Tasmania v South Australia
- Only LA: 3 November 1984 Tasmania v New South Wales

Career statistics
Competition	First-class	List A
Matches	4	1
Runs scored	15	2
Batting average	3.00	–
100s/50s	0/0	0/0
Top score	7	2*
Balls bowled	648	60
Wickets	9	1
Bowling average	46.11	41.00
5 wickets in innings	0	0
10 wickets in match	0	0
Best bowling	4/44	1/41
Catches/stumpings	0/–	0/–
- Source: CricketArchive, 4 January 2011

William Stanley Kirkman (born 14 February 1961) was an Australian cricketer who played four first-class matches for the Tasmanian Tigers between 1982 and 1987. He also played one List A cricket match for the side. He was a medium-fast bowler.
