= Grant Guilford =

New Zealand veterinary academic

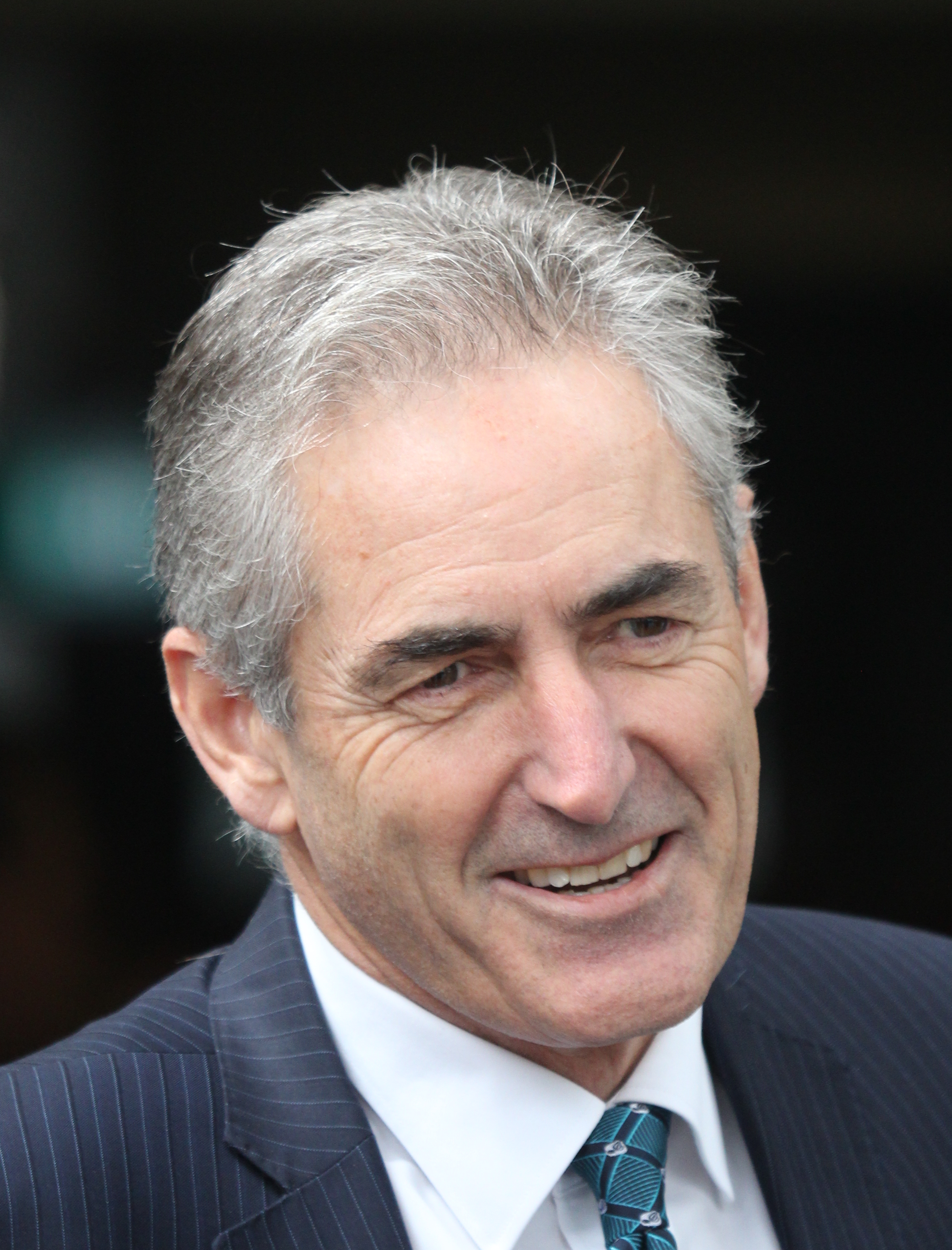
- Born: William Grant Guilford; Christchurch, New Zealand
- Education: Massey University; University of California, Davis
- Scientific career
- Fields: Veterinary Internal Medicine and Clinical Nutrition
- Thesis: Experimental studies of gastrointestinal ischemia-reperfusion injury and food sensitivity in dogs. (1993)

William Grant Guilford is a retired New Zealand academic, specializing in veterinary nutrition. He is currently Chair of the New Zealand Veterinary Association. He was previously Head of the Institute of Veterinary, Animal Sciences at Massey University, dean of science at the University of Auckland and Vice-Chancellor of Te Herenga Waka—Victoria University of Wellington.

== Academic career ==
After a Bachelor of Veterinary Science and Bachelor of Philosophy at Massey University, Guilford completed a PhD in nutrition from the University of California, Davis. The title of his 1993 thesis was Experimental Studies of Gastrointestinal Ischemia-Reperfusion Injury and Food Sensitivity in Dogs.

He qualified as a specialist in veterinary internal medicine becoming a Diplomate of the American College of Veterinary Internal Medicine in 1988 and a Fellow of the Australian College of Veterinary Scientists in 1992. Guilford worked at the University of Missouri and the University of California, Davis, before returning to New Zealand and Massey University, where he studied food allergies in domestic pets.

Guilford was first author on the third edition of the veterinary textbook Strombeck's Small Animal Gastroenterology. According to the Scopus citation index, he has an H-index of 19 with (from 52 publication and >1000 citations) as of April 2022.

In addition to his work on small animals, Guilford along with others highlighted the risks to New Zealand's biosecurity, biodiversity and public health posed by the introduction of exotic dung beetles.

== University administrative career ==
Professor Guilford served for 10 years as the Foundation Head of the Institute of Veterinary, Animal and Biomedical Sciences at Massey University. The institute became the first veterinary school in the southern hemisphere to be accredited by the American Veterinary Medical Association. Other notable developments during this period were the launch of New Zealand Veterinary Pathology Ltd and the creation of the Hopkirk Institute, a joint venture with AgResearch in animal health and veterinary public health. Guilford faced opposition from animal rights activists, some of whom took direct action, with the Animal Liberation Front taking dogs from a farm owned by the university.

Guilford moved to the University of Auckland as dean of science in 2009. At the University of Auckland Faculty of Science, he launched a number of joint postgraduate schools with Crown Research Institutes and was responsible for the redevelopment of the Faculty's physical facilities at the Leigh Marine Laboratory and the Science Centre at the City Campus.

Guilford served as Vice-Chancellor of Victoria University of Wellington from March 2014 until 4 March 2022. During his eight years as Vice-Chancellor, staff numbers (FTE) increased from 1990 in 2014 to 2,329 in 2021, his last full year as Vice-Chancellor, including a 23% increase in research and teaching staff. Over the same period, student numbers increased from 16,901 (EFTS) to 18,241, partly due to the growth in engineering and the establishment of a Faculty of Health along with the ongoing popularity of the humanities. Māori enrolments increased from 10.2% of the domestic student population to 11.9%. The university's consolidated revenues (including its Foundation) increased from $381 million to $530 million and net assets increased from $649 million to over $1 billion. External research income doubled to reach $80 million in 2021 and the university retained the rank of first overall in New Zealand for the intensity of high quality research in the 2018 Performance Based Research Funding assessment round.

In spite of this strong research performance, the university fell in the Times Higher Education rankings and remained static in the QS rankings during his tenure, trends similar to most other New Zealand universities. A better performance was achieved in the Times Higher Education Impact rankings in which the university was ranked 85th in the world in 2022, with rankings in support of the Sustainable Development Goals of climate action; peace, justice and strong institutions; and affordable clean energy (ranked 12th, 24th and 35th in the world, respectively).

During his time as Vice-Chancellor, the university added a new science building, Te Toki a Rata and a postgraduate student and administration block, Maru. Guilford also committed the university to redevelopment of the university's marae and partnering with the City in the redevelopment of the Wellington Town Hall for a national music centre.

== Controversies ==
Under Guilford, the Victoria University of Wellington's Karori campus was sold by a tender process to private developers. This led to tension between the Ministry of Education, the Wellington City Council, the Karori community, and Victoria University of Wellington as many considered that it was improper for the university to make such a profit off public land. However, Guilford noted that the university had spent around $21 million upgrading the campus and had invested the proceeds of the sale in seismic strengthening and a scholarship programme for students from low decile schools in Wellington.

In May 2018, Guilford announced that Victoria University of Wellington was considering renaming the institution to "The University of Wellington" and replacing its existing Te Reo Māori name with 'Te Herenga Waka'. His stated rationale was to provide clarity and avoid similarly named institutions taking credit for work done in Wellington, saying "The achievements of our staff and students, and for that matter our city, can be attributed to other institutions and countries, dimming our international standing." The proposal was approved by the University Council. However, opposition to the proposed name change led to thousands of written submissions and a petition against the change being received from students, staff, graduates and alumni of the university. In December 2018, the Minister of Education, Chris Hipkins declined the name change. The Minister concluded: 'Given the level of opposition to the university's recommendation, including by its own staff, students and alumni, I am not persuaded that the recommendation is consistent with the demands of accountability and the national interest." The University went on to adopt Te Herenga Waka as its Te Reo Māori name and changed its logos and branding to emphasise Te Herenga Waka and Wellington in its name, a move described as "a name change by stealth."

A number of controversies arose during the COVID-19 pandemic. In response to the border and movement restrictions and the loss of income from international students, Guilford proposed changes to academic structures and instituted new on-line teaching practices required by government, funding cuts, pay restraint, hiring restrictions and voluntary redundancies alongside student fee discounts. These steps were unpopular with staff and students and there was also tension between Guilford's administration and staff represented by the Tertiary Education Union, leading to withdrawal of the proposed changes to academic structures. Students were also critical of the refusal to automatically upscale the grades of students in response to the stresses incurred during the COVID-19 epidemic, discount fees for international and domestic students studying on-line, and waive halls of residence fees. In response the University temporarily reinstated the residence fee waiver and augmented its financial hardship grants. Guilford acknowledged the pressure the combination of cost-cutting and increased workload had placed on staff and students during the pandemic but maintained it was important for the university not to 'kick the can down the road'. In a speech in 2020 he announced that because insufficient staff had taken redundancy, "unfortunately, therefore, it's looking increasingly likely that to fulfil our commitments to kaitiakitanga and intergenerational responsibility, we will be facing hard decisions early next year."

== Climate Change ==
Victoria University of Wellington divested itself from fossil fuels and implemented a five-point plan to reduce carbon emissions during Guilford's tenure as Vice-Chancellor. Guilford has called for politicians to act on climate change, and made a brief submission to the Ministry for the Environment consultation phase on setting New Zealand's post-2020 climate change target.

== Recognition and Retirement ==
Guilford was the recipient of the Australasian Green Gown Award for sustainability leadership and now spends most of his time on two conservation blocks he owns with his wife.

Guilford announced his retirement from Victoria University of Wellington in 2021, to take effect on 4 March 2022. He was replaced by Acting Vice-Chancellor Jennifer Windsor, followed by Nic Smith (January 2023-February 2026) and Bryony James (appointed June 2026).

== Roles outside of academia ==
As of 2023, Guilford is currently the Chair of the New Zealand Veterinary Association and Hale Animal Health. He has previously held positions on the board of the Wellington Regional Economic Development Agency, several companies, including New Zealand Genomics Limited, centres of research excellence, including the Maurice Wilkins Centre for Molecular Biodiscovery, and the Crown Research Institute Landcare Research Limited.
