= Thomas Hunter (psychologist) =

New Zealand psychologist (1876–1953)

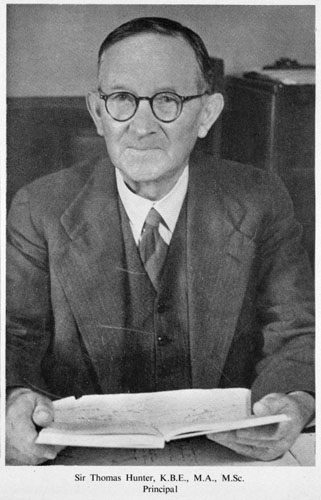
Hunter, c. 1949

Sir Thomas Alexander Hunter KBE (28 February 1876 – 20 April 1953) was a New Zealand psychologist, university professor and administrator. He was vice chancellor of the University of New Zealand from 1929 to 1947, chairman of Massey Agricultural College from 1936 to 1938, and principal of Victoria University College from 1938 to 1951. At the age of seventy-five, Hunter retired after serving, for almost fifty years, at Victoria University College.

== Early life ==
Hunter was born in Croydon, Surrey, England. His parents Louisa Jane Harton, William Hunter, and Thomas went to Otago, New Zealand, in 1880. Thomas attended Port Chalmers District High School. Then went off to the University of Otago where he studied mental and moral philosophy.

== Career ==
Before becoming a psychologist Hunter taught in Waitaki Boys' High School and the worked at Victoria College, lecturing on mental science and political economy for a year. Hunter's first interest in psychology was in an experimental approach to learning and the problems of perception; he was inspired by the work of William Rivers, Wilhelm Wundt and Edward B. Titchener. He was constantly mindful of new ideas and trends, but his major interest in the problems of perception and learning would always have him eager. Towards the end of the year 1907, he was granted professor of mental science and economics, in 1909 changed to mental and moral philosophy, a subject area which evolved into the two fields of psychology and philosophy.

== Honours and awards ==
In 1935, Hunter was awarded the King George V Silver Jubilee Medal. He was appointed a Knight Commander of the Order of the British Empire in the 1939 King's Birthday Honours, and in 1952 he became an honorary fellow of the British Psychological Society.

In 1946, Hunter's colleagues presented him with a volume of essays, The university and the community, the first time such event took place in New Zealand. In 1950 he received an honorary doctorate of literature from the University of New Zealand. A portrait of Hunter by Evelyn Page, painted in 1949, hangs in the university building that now bears his name.

Hunter was the first professor of psychology in New Zealand, and the Hunter Award was established in 1972 in his memory. It is awarded every three years by the New Zealand Psychological Society, and recognises excellence in scholarship, research and professional achievements in psychology.

== Other sources ==
- A & C Black (December 2007). "Hunter, Sir Thomas (Alexander)". Who Was Who. Oxford University Press.
