= Journal of Food Engineering =

The Journal of Food Engineering is a biweekly peer-reviewed scientific journal covering engineering, science, and technology related to food production. The editor-in-chief is R. Paul Singh (University of California, Davis).

According to the Journal Citation Reports, the journal has a 2022 impact factor of 5.5.
