= List of New Zealand university leaders =

The list of New Zealand university leaders below shows the chancellors (ceremonial heads and chairs of university councils) and vice-chancellors (executive heads or chief executives) of New Zealand's eight universities.

Since the development of the university sector in New Zealand a small number of Vice-Chancellors (Principal, President, or Director) have served for 15 years or more with some portion of this time in office as Vice-Chancellor in New Zealand. They include:

31 years: Sir Geoffrey Peren KBE (Massey 1927–58)

27 years: Robert Alexander (Lincoln 1908–35)

24 years: Sir Alan Stewart (educator) KBE (Massey 1959–83), Sir Colin Maiden (Auckland 1971–95)

22 years: Sir Malcolm Burns KBE (Lincoln 1952–74)

20 years: Sir Robert Aitken (Birmingham 1953–68, Otago 1948–53), Sir Robert Irvine (Otago 1973–93), Sir Donald R. Llewellyn (Waikato 1964–84) James McWha AO (Lincoln 2018, Rwanda 2013–15, Adelaide 2002–12, Massey 1996–2001), Stuart McCutcheon (Auckland 2005–20, Victoria University of Wellington 2000–04)

18 years: John Chapman Andrew (UNZ 1887–1905), Derek McCormack (AUT 2004–2022)

17 years: Sir George Currie (academic) (UNZ 1952–62, Western Australia 1945–52), Jim Williams (Victoria University of Wellington 1951–68)

16 years: Eric Alexander (Lincoln 1908–35)

15 years: Cheryl de la Rey (Canterbury 2019-present, Pretoria 2009–18)

The current Chancellors and Vice-Chancellors are:

Institution	Chancellor	Vice-chancellor
Auckland University of Technology	Rob Campbell	Damon Salesa
Lincoln University	Bruce Gemmell	Grant Edwards
Massey University	Alistair Davis	Pierre Venter
University of Auckland	Cecilia Tarrant	Dawn Freshwater
University of Canterbury	Amy Adams	Cheryl de la Rey
University of Otago	Stephen Higgs	Grant Robertson
Victoria University of Wellington	Alan Judge	Bryony James
University of Waikato	Anand Satyanand	Neil Quigley

== See also ==
- Lists of university leaders
