= Keith Sheen =

New Zealand public servant and educationalist (1912–1998)

- Born: Keith John Sheen; 28 April 1912; Gisborne, New Zealand
- Died: 5 May 1998 (aged 86); Dunedin, New Zealand
- Occupation: Educationalist
- Known for: The development of the education system in New Zealand, language teaching

Academic background
- Education: Gisborne High School, Christchurch Teachers' Training College
- Alma mater: University College London
- Thesis: Development of ideas in the works of Paul Adam (1935)

Academic work
- Discipline: Latin, French philology
- Institutions: Otago Boys' High School

Keith John Sheen (28 April 1912 – 5 May 1998) was a New Zealand educationalist. He was educated in Gisborne and trained as a teacher in Christchurch. After graduating with first class honours in Latin, he completed a PhD in French at University College London. Returning to New Zealand, he taught languages for fourteen years at Otago Boys' High School, where he was renowned for his ability to keep discipline. In 1950 Sheen became liaison officer at Auckland University College, before moving to the Department of Education, where he held several positions. He was appointed to the Commission on Education in 1960, and in 1966 was appointed Director-General of Education. After his retirement in 1971 he was a visiting fellow in the education department of the University of Otago, and published a translation of the elegies of Propertius.

== Early life and education ==
Sheen was born on 28 April 1912 in Gisborne. His parents were John Edward Sheen and Minnie née Hillman. Sheen's mother died while he was still young, and he was brought up by his father, who was a carpenter. Sheen attended Gisborne Central School and Gisborne High School, where he was dux in 1928. Sheen taught as a probationer at a small school near Gisborne. The school suffered from a pest problem, and Sheen's daughter said that he grew skilled at killing rats with a frying pan. He attended Christchurch Teachers' Training College from 1930 to 1932, and graduated with a Bachelor of Arts in 1930 and an MA with first class honours in Latin in 1931. He won a postgraduate scholarship and studied at University College London, graduating with a PhD in French in 1935, with a thesis on the work of Paul Adam.

== Career ==
On his return to New Zealand, Sheen taught Latin, French, German and English classes at Otago Boys' High School, where he was remembered by ex-pupil Brigadier Brian McMahon: "How fortunate we were that the Humanities departments at Universities hadn’t expanded, where talents such as his would now be in high demand. He was a quietly spoken gentleman who taught in a student friendly Socratic style". Another ex-pupil described him as "an immaculate disciplinarian, who could command silence by just the raising of his hand and a stern stare". Sheen was a senior master at the school by 1950, when he was appointed to the position of liaison officer at the Auckland University College. In 1953 he joined the Department of Education as an Inspector of Secondary Schools.

In 1960 Sheen was appointed as secretary to the Commission on Education (under the chairmanship of George Currie). Other positions he held in the Department of Education include District Senior Inspector of Secondary Schools in Christchurch and curriculum development officer, followed by a year as Assistant-Director General in 1965.

Sheen was appointed Director-General of Education in 1966, succeeding Arnold Campbell, and retired in 1971. From 1972 until 1974 he was a visiting fellow in the education department at the University of Otago in Dunedin. He also served on the university grants board.

== Personal life ==
Sheen married Constance Lucy Wall in 1936. They had a son and a daughter.

Sheen wrote poetry and short stories, which were unpublished. He reviewed poetry for Landfall. He published privately a translation from Latin of the elegies of Propertius in 1977. Sheen was a keen tennis player, and while at Canterbury a champion hockey player. Later in life both he and his wife were keen members of the Otago Bridge Club.

After a long illness, Sheen died in the Leslie Groves Hospital in Dunedin on the 5 May 1998, at the age of 86.

== See also ==
- Bill Renwick – New Zealand public servant and educationalist (1929–2013), Director-General of Education 1975–88
- Ned Dobbs – Director-General of Education 1971–75
