= Leslie Kay =

Leslie Kay may refer to:

- Leslie Kay (engineer) (1922–2020), British–New Zealand electrical engineer
- Leslie M. Kay, American neuroscientist
- Leslie Ronald Kay (1920–2019), British university administrator

== See also ==
- Lesli Kay (born 1965), American actress
