= Pro-chancellor =

University administrator

A pro-chancellor is an officer of some universities in Commonwealth countries and Hong Kong. The pro-chancellor acts as a deputy to the chancellor and as practical chairman of the university council. In this role, a pro-chancellor may fulfil a number of formal and informal functions, such as presiding over conferment of degrees, regulatory oversight of the university, and facilitating partnerships or relationships in other settings. The actual chief executive of a university is the vice-chancellor.

In Australia, Flinders University (the oldest extant South Australian university) elected no fewer than ten Pro-Chancellors between 1966–2005; after which time the role was rebranded as that of Deputy Chancellor.

== See also ==
- Lists of university leaders
  - Administrators: trustee, president, vice president, university principal, dean, provost
  - Other: college, faculty, professor
