= 1966 New Year Honours (New Zealand) =

Annual awards for New Zealanders

The 1966 New Year Honours in New Zealand were appointments by Elizabeth II on the advice of the New Zealand government to various orders and honours to reward and highlight good works by New Zealanders. The awards celebrated the passing of 1965 and the beginning of 1966, and were announced on 1 January 1966.

The recipients of honours are displayed here as they were styled before their new honour.

== Knight Bachelor ==
- Francis Joseph Kitts. For outstanding services as mayor of Wellington.
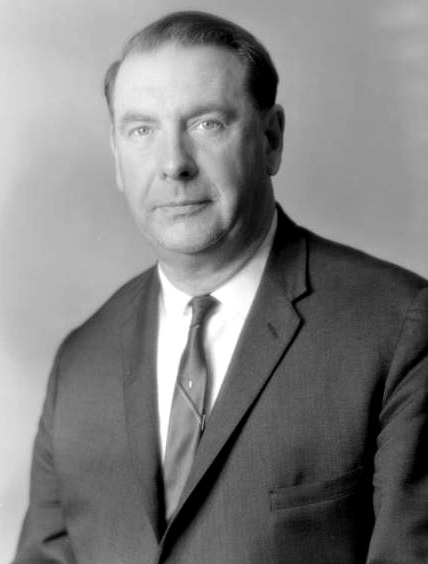
Sir Frank Kitts

== Order of Saint Michael and Saint George ==
=== Companion (CMG) ===
- Arnold Everitt Campbell – director, Department of Education.
- Thomas Wilfred Perry – of Christchurch. For valuable services to business, finance and the footwear manufacturing industry.

== Order of the British Empire ==
=== Knight Commander (KBE) ===
Civil division

- Jack Richard Butland – of Auckland. For community and philanthropic services.

=== Commander (CBE) ===
Civil division

- Brian Gerald Barratt-Boyes MB FRACS – of Auckland. For services to medicine.
- Jack Ian King – of Wellington. For services to architecture and to the Standards Institute.
- Matthew Garnet Latta. For services in the field of electrical engineering in New Zealand.
- Henry James Thompson MC ED JP – of Wellington. For services as a stipendiary magistrate.

Military division

- Brigadier Stanley Frederick Catchpole OBE MC ED – New Zealand Brigadiers' List, Territorial Force.

=== Officer (OBE) ===
Civil division

- Louis Amos Bennett MD FRCS. For services to the community, especially as a member of the North Canterbury Hospital Board.
- Albert Oliver Dare – high commissioner for New Zealand in the Cook Islands.
- The Reverend John Gilman Sharp Dunn MBE – of Wellington. For services to the community.
- William George Hilliker JP – general manager of the Dunedin Savings Bank.
- Cyril Spottiswoode Moy Hopkirk ED – of Palmerston North. For services in the field of veterinary science.
- Hallyburton Johnstone JP – of Hamilton. For services to farming and in political life.
- Henare Tiakiriri Keepa – of Whangārei. For services to the Māori people.
- Alexander Arthur MacFarlane DFC – of Rotherham. For services to local government.
- Tasman Joseph McKee – of Nelson. For services to industry, particularly to mineral development.
- Herbert John Morgan – chief judge of the Land Court, Cook Islands.
- Roland Maunsell Perry – of Masterton. For services to farming, particularly as a leading sheep breeder.
- The Reverend Douglas Milne Riddle. For services with the Presbyterian overseas missions, especially in Ambala District, Punjab East, India.
- Alex Gatonby Stead – of Hastings. For public services, particularly in connection with the Sheep Dog Trial Association of New Zealand.

Military division

- Commander George William Shotter – Royal New Zealand Navy.
- Lieutenant-Colonel Edward Harden Lyndale Maxwell MC – Royal New Zealand Artillery (Regular Force)
- Wing Commander John Maxwell Carr – Royal New Zealand Air Force.

=== Member (MBE) ===
Civil division

- Frederick William Archer – of Reefton. For community and local-body services.
- Kathrine McAllister Bell JP. For services to education and the community, especially as chairman of the Tauranga College Board of Governors.
- Reginald William Bennett JP – of Waiuku. For services to local government.
- Royston Goodall Brown – superintendent, Waikeria Youth Centre, Te Awamutu.
- Mervyn Mackie Chisholm. For services to agriculture, especially as supervising manager, Molesworth Station.
- Alfred James Cox. For services to the community, especially in the development of public, parks in the Gisborne district.
- James Owen Cruse – deputy superintendent, Paparua Prison, Christchurch.
- Muriel Annie Eliza Eastwood JP – of Te Aroha. For community services, especially in connection with the Women's Division of the Federated Farmers of New Zealand.
- Leopold Faigan JP – of Otago Central. For services to the community and local government.
- Mary Elizabeth Gibbard. For services to the community, especially as mayoress of Dannevirke.
- Samuel Swanston Green JP. For services to local government and community welfare, especially as mayor of Dargaville.
- Thomas William George Howard Hammond – of Thames Coast. For services in the field of Māori history and ethnology.
- William John Inskip JP. For services to local government in Ōpōtiki.
- Jessie Jarvis – of New Plymouth. For community services, especially in Red Cross work.
- Frank Hugh Muirhead – of Invercargill. For community welfare services, especially as president of the Returned Services' Association.
- Irene Gwenivere Olorenshaw – lately matron of Oamaru Hospital.
- Alexander Reade Robbins – of Featherston. For services to returned servicemen and rehabilitation work.
- Glassie Davy George Strickland JP. For services to the people of the Cook Islands, especially in the field of public welfare.
- Inia Te Wiata. For services in the field of operatic singing.
- Upoko Tokoa Wichman. For welfare services in the Cook Islands.

Military division

- Sub-Lieutenant Keith Ivor Knight – Royal New Zealand Navy.
- Major Frank Finnegan – New Zealand Cadet Corps.
- Lieutenant-Colonel (temporary) John Moore Morris – Royal New Zealand Infantry Regiment (Regular Force).
- Warrant Officer Class I Walter Lessel Pearless – Royal New Zealand Infantry Regiment (Regular Force).
- Squadron Leader John Lewis Nicholson Harris – Royal New Zealand Air Force.
- Flight Lieutenant Colin Selwyn Harvey Calvert – Royal New Zealand Air Force.
- Warrant Officer James Vincent Mulcare – Royal New Zealand Air Force.

== British Empire Medal (BEM) ==
Civil division, for gallantry

- Charles Christiansen Hood – second officer, Paparua Prison, Christchurch. For outstanding courage and determination when serious rioting broke out in the chapel of Paparua Prison.
- Gustav Hjalmer Lindstrom – constable, New Zealand Police. For initiative and courage in effecting the arrest of an armed and dangerous offender who had escaped from Waikune Prison. Mr Lindtrom, died on 20 November 2019, aged 85, NZ Herald
- Humphrey Standford Stroud – first officer, Auckland Prison. For outstanding courage and devotion to duty in ensuring the safety of prison inmates when a fire broke out following rioting in Auckland Prison.
- David Clark Taylor – second officer, Auckland Prison. For outstanding courage and devotion to duty in ensuring the safety of prison inmates when a fire broke out following rioting in Auckland Prison.

Civil division, for meritorious service

- Frederick Charles Bush. For services to the Timaru Public Hospital.
- Tukua Cameron – head teacher, Cook Islands.
- Wilfred James Firmin – constable, New Zealand Police Force.
- David Metuarau JP – formerly resident agent and commissioner of the Court, Penrhyn, Cook Islands.
- George Sherman – formerly construction superintendent, Ministry of Works.
- Lionel James Voice – placement officer, New Zealand Foundation for the Blind.

Military division

- Sick Berth Chief Petty Officer Douglas Frank Blanchett – Royal New Zealand Navy.
- Chief Communication Yeoman Joseph Eric Rea Collicoat – Royal New Zealand Naval Volunteer Reserve.
- Chief Petty Officer Richard Vaughan Gordon – Royal New Zealand Navy.
- Chief Petty Officer Steward Raymond Sidney Edward Shorter – Royal New Zealand Navy.
- Staff Sergeant Te Huia Bennett – Royal New Zealand Army Service Corps (Regular Force).
- Corporal Niwa Kawha – New Zealand Special Air Service (Regular Force).
- Flight Sergeant Arthur Ronald Stacey – Royal New Zealand Air Force.

== Air Force Cross (AFC) ==
- Flight Lieutenant John Stewart Boys – Royal New Zealand Air Force.

== Queen's Fire Services Medal (QFSM) ==
- Leonard Robert George Harlen – chief fire officer, Hastings Fire Brigade.
- Norman McLeod – chief fire officer, Mataura Volunteer Fire Brigade.

== Queen's Police Medal (QPM) ==
- Edward William Mahood – assistant commissioner, New Zealand Police Force.
