= Chancellor (education) =

Leader of a university or college

A chancellor is a leader of a college or university, usually either the executive or ceremonial head of a university or of a campus within a university system.

In most Commonwealth and former Commonwealth nations, the chancellor is usually a ceremonial non-resident head of the university. In such institutions, the chief executive of a university is the vice-chancellor, who may carry an additional title such as "president" (e.g., "president and vice-chancellor"). The chancellor may serve as chairperson of the governing body; otherwise, this duty is held by a chairperson who may be known as a pro-chancellor.

In many countries, the administrative and educational head of the university is known as the president, principal or rector. In the United States, the head of a university is usually referred to as the university president, while the executive head of a specific campus within a multi-campus university system may have the title of chancellor and report to the overall system's president, although the titles are sometimes reversed.

== Chancellor ==
=== Australia and New Zealand ===
In both Australia and New Zealand, a chancellor is the chairperson of a university's governing body; thus, as well as having ceremonial duties, the chancellor participates in the governance of the university (but not its active management). The chancellor is assisted by a deputy chancellor (known as the pro-chancellor in some universities). The chancellor and deputy chancellor are frequently drawn from the senior ranks of business or the judiciary (it is one of the few jobs considered compatible with judicial service). Some universities have a visitor who is senior to the chancellor. University disputes can be appealed from the governing board to the visitor (as is still the case in the UK), but nowadays, such appeals are generally prohibited by legislation, and the position has only ceremonial functions (unlike the chancellor and deputy chancellor, who frequently preside at functions such as graduations, the visitor rarely attends university functions). The vice-chancellor usually serves as the chief executive of the university.

Macquarie University in Sydney is an anomaly as it once had the unique position of Emeritus Deputy Chancellor, a post created for John Lincoln upon his retirement from his long-held post of deputy chancellor in 2000. The position was not merely an honorary title, as it also retained for Lincoln a place in the University Council until his death in 2011.

=== Bangladesh ===
The chancellor is a titular position in Bangladesh and is always held by the incumbent President of Bangladesh under the Private Universities Act 1992. The position in public universities is not fixed for the president under any acts or laws (since the erection of a state university in Bangladesh requires an act to be passed in itself), but it has been the custom so far to name the incumbent president of the country as chancellor of all state universities thus established. The day-to-day operations of the university are run by the vice-chancellor. The vice-chancellor has a deputy called the pro-vice-chancellor.

=== Canada ===
Canadian universities have a titular chancellor similar to those in England and Wales, with day-to-day operations typically handled by a vice-chancellor. The vice-chancellor usually carries the joint title of "president and vice-chancellor" or "rector and vice-chancellor".

=== Finland ===
In Finland, if the university has a chancellor (Finnish: Kansleri, Swedish: Kansler), they are the leading official in the university. The duties of the chancellor are mainly to promote sciences and to look after the best interests of the university. As the rector of the university (Finnish: rehtori, Swedish: rektor) remains the de facto administrative leader and chief executive official, the role of the chancellor is more of a social, political and even historical nature. However some administrative duties still belong to the chancellor's jurisdiction despite their often arguably ceremonial nature. Examples of these include the appointment of new professors and docents.

The chancellor of University of Helsinki (the oldest and largest in Finland) has also the right to be present and to speak in the plenary meetings of the Council of State when matters regarding the university are discussed. Despite their role as the chancellor of only one university, they are often regarded as the political representative of Finland's entire university institution when they exercise their rights in the Council of State.

In the history of Finland the office of the chancellor dates all the way back to the Swedish Empire, and later the Russian Empire. Historically the chancellor's duty was to function as the official representative of the monarch in the autonomous university.

The number of chancellors in Finnish universities has declined over the years, and in the vast majority of Finnish universities the highest official is the rector. The remaining universities with chancellors are University of Helsinki and Åbo Akademi University.

=== France ===
In France, chancellor (chancelier) is one of the titles of the rector (recteur), a senior civil servant of the Ministry of Education serving as manager of a regional educational district (académie). In his capacity as chancellor, the rector awards academic degrees to the university's graduates, oversees the legality of the universities' executive acts and channels funding from the ministry. The rector has no executive function in any university but remains a member ex officio of the board of every public university in his district.

=== Germany and Poland ===
In Poland, the chancellor (kanclerz) is the head of many universities' administration and the leader of the non-academic staff while the rector is the academic head. The main academic bodies of the university consists of: rektor (the head of the university), prorektor (deputy rector), dziekan (the head of the faculty), prodziekan (deputy head of the faculty), senat (senate: the main council of the university). In universities with presidential constitution, the university's president holds both the functions of chancellor and rector.

Similarly, in Germany the chancellor (Kanzler) is the head of the administration, and regularly is recruited not from a scholarly but from an administrative background. The chancellor is a member of the governing body of the university Hochschulleitung, which is directed by either a rector Rektor or a president Präsident, whose precise role may vary among universities. Traditionally, the chancellor had the role to represent the local king or later the government in the university and to make sure that the university is compliant with government laws and policies. After universities gained more autonomy in the 20th century, they also got more freedom in choosing the chancellor by themselves. However, still today the chancellor is not an administrator who is entirely subordinate to the president but an office holder who oversees a host of responsibilities assigned to him or her directly by higher education law. This can give the chancellor a considerable veto power in the university leadership.

=== Hong Kong ===
In Hong Kong, the Chief Executive of Hong Kong (before 1997 the Governor of Hong Kong) acts as the chancellor of all chartered universities, which includes all eight public universities and Hong Kong Metropolitan University. Day-to-day operation is in the hands of either a vice-chancellor (older and established institutions) or a president (in newer institutions), depending on the institution.

=== India ===
In India, almost all universities have a chancellor as their titular head, whose function is largely ceremonial. The governor of the state appointed as the union's representative of state by the president, is the honorary chancellor of all state-owned universities. The de facto head of any government university is the vice-chancellor.

A private university or deemed university is headed by a president rather than a chancellor.

=== Ireland ===
In Ireland, four universities have a chancellor. The chancellor of the National University of Ireland is also chair of the senate of the university, while the chancellors of Dublin City University and the University of Limerick are also the chairs of those universities' governing authorities. The chancellor of the University of Dublin presides at meetings of the university's senate and is one of the two visitors of Trinity College Dublin.

=== Malaysia ===
In Malaysia, the chancellor position is given to dignitaries such as royalty or prominent politicians by universities to represent the universities in the political arena. For example, the chancellor of University of Malaya, the oldest university in Malaysia is Sultan Nazrin Shah, the Sultan of Perak.

All public universities except the International Islamic University of Malaysia used the term chancellor. While for IIUM, the Constitutional Head which has same degree as the chancellor is used.

=== Nepal ===
In Nepal, universities have a chancellor as ceremonial head. The de facto head of the university is the vice-chancellor. The chancellor is primarily responsible for attending the convocation programmes and accepting the resignation and appointment letter of a new vice-chancellor. Generally, the prime minister is considered the chancellor, and in his absence, the minister of education acts as the chancellor.

=== Pakistan ===
In Pakistan, chancellor is normally the ceremonial figurehead of the government as well as the few private non-for-profit universities, who is normally the provincial governor where that university which government administration the university falls (President of Pakistan in case of Federal Government Universities). The Chancellor is kept in hand of the head of State/Province for the unity of all public universities and shows governmental involvement in university's executive affairs. Day-to-day business of the university is run by the Vice Chancellor, deputed by Pro Vice Chancellor, in case of public university and Rector, deputed by Vice Rector, in case of private not-for-profit university. The Chancellor appoints the Vice Chancellor nominated by the search committee.

=== Philippines ===
In the Philippines, the De La Salle University designates the head of its university as the chancellor. For the University of the Philippines, the entire system is headed by a president, while the eight constituent universities under the system is each headed by a chancellor. The chancellor designates the different vice-chancellors for different areas of concern of the university: academic affairs, finance, and community affairs, among others. Some more universities like University of Santo Tomas and other colleges institutions have chancellors. Its chancellor is the incumbent Master of the Order of Preachers (Dominicans); meanwhile, the vice chancellor is the prior provincial of the Dominican Province of the Philippines. Their roles are largely ceremonial. The University of Santo Tomas is governed mainly by [[Rector Magnificus of the University of Santo Tomas|its rector magnificus]] in overseeing its academic, financial and other affairs. The Central Seminary under the University of Santo Tomas also has an appointed Chancellor who acts as the executive secretary of the rector and the guardian of the archives of the seminary.

Other universities in the Philippines (such as state universities like Mindanao State University where each constituent campus is headed by chancellor) are mostly headed by their respective university presidents.

=== United Kingdom ===
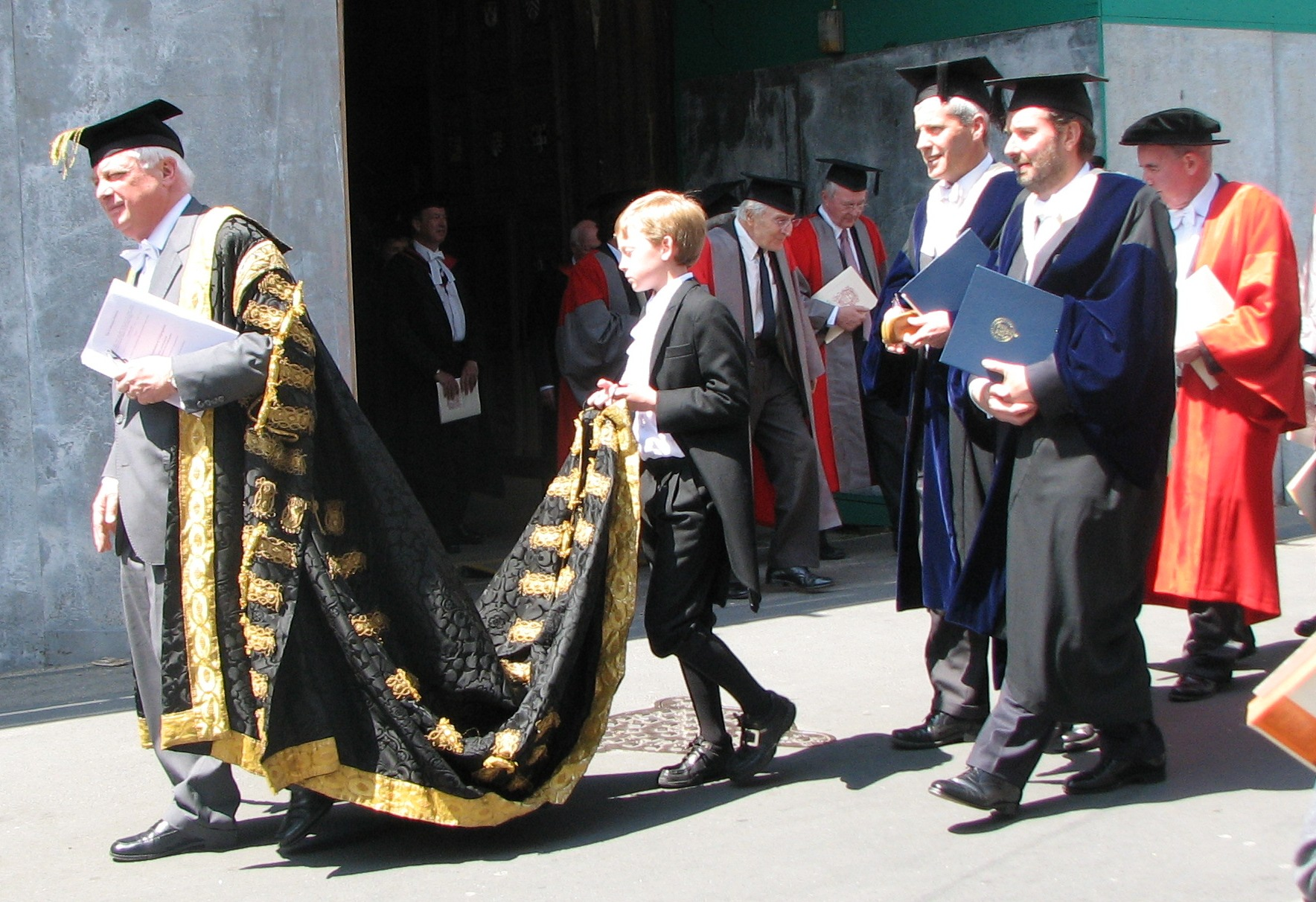
The Chancellor of the University of Oxford, Lord Patten, in procession at encaenia, 2009

In the United Kingdom, a university chancellor is a ceremonial position held by a prominent person. In England, Wales and Northern Ireland, the executive head of the university is usually the vice-chancellor, while in Scotland, the executive head is titled the "principal and vice-chancellor".

=== United States ===
In the United States, heads of colleges and universities are typically called "president". A multi-campus university system may be headed by a chancellor who serves as systemwide chief, with presidents governing individual institutions. This is more commonly seen in university systems which were belatedly formed by grouping together already-extant colleges or universities in the 20th century, such as the State University of New York, the City University of New York, and the California State University. In many state university systems which began with a single flagship campus in the 18th or 19th century and gradually delegated operational authority to satellite campuses during the 20th century, the titles are reversed. This is the case in Arkansas, California, North Carolina, Illinois, Massachusetts, Missouri, and Wisconsin.

Outside of university systems, presidents are the functional chief executive officers of most standalone US universities. However, a few universities, such as the University of Kansas, Syracuse University and the University of Pittsburgh, have a chancellor as their chief executive officer. There are occasional other uses of the title "chancellor". The College of William & Mary uses the term "chancellor" in the British sense, as a figurehead leader, but the actual executive of the school is the "president", not a "vice-chancellor". The University of the South uses the term "chancellor" in the same manner as William & Mary, but its actual chief executive is titled "vice-chancellor". Some schools, such as Lubbock Christian University, give the ceremonial title of "chancellor" to a retiring university president. The Catholic University of America is headed by their president (formerly "rector"), with the Archbishop of Washington serving as chancellor, a ceremonial position but one which does require the archbishop to represent the university before the Holy See. This scenario, while not always exactly duplicated, is typical in other Catholic universities due to the Catholic hierarchy. In some schools run by Catholic religious orders, the rector of the community supersedes the president when the latter is a member of that religious order. In some universities, such as Massachusetts Institute of Technology, the chancellor is a high-ranking officer below the president and equal to or below the provost, who might have vice-chancellors reporting to her or him.

The title "chancellor" is sometimes used in K-12 education in a sense similar to superintendent of schools, particularly in urban school districts. The New York City Schools Chancellor is the chief executive officer of the New York City Department of Education, which manages the city's public school system (the largest in the United States). The leader of the District of Columbia Public Schools system is also referred to as the chancellor.

== President ==
A president is the highest-ranking officer within the academic administration of a university, within university systems that prefer that appellation over other variations such as vice-chancellor or rector. The relative seniority varies between institutions.

=== France ===
In France, the president is the elected chair of the board and chief executive officer in universities. The president is always elected by the board among the professors of the university. The president serves a four-year term which is renewable once. The chancellor is a servant of the Ministry of Education.

=== United Kingdom ===
In a number of British universities, the title of president is used alongside that of vice-chancellor for the chief executive officer, as either "president and vice-chancellor" or "vice-chancellor and president". In a few institutions the title of president is used alone (rather than with vice-chancellor) for the chief executive, e.g., Imperial College London and City St George's, University of London.

Historically, the title of president was used for the ceremonial heads of constituent institutions of the University of Wales, thus the politician Neil Kinnock was President of Cardiff University from 1998 until succeeded in 2009 by the Nobel prize winner Sir Martin Evans. Some member institution of the University of London, such as Birkbeck, University of London, also use the title of president for their ceremonial head.

=== United States ===
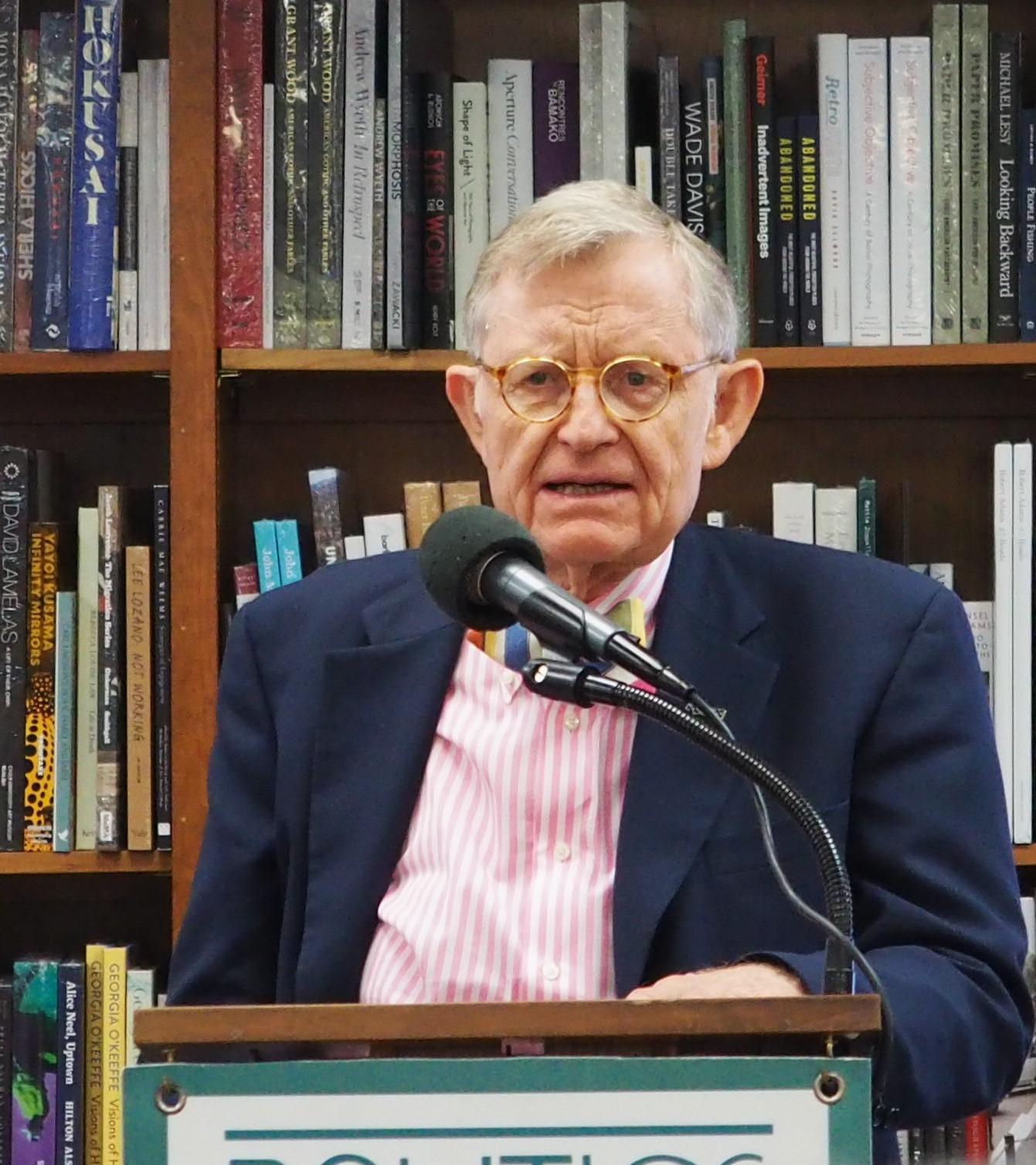
E. Gordon Gee, former president of Brown University, Ohio State University, Vanderbilt University, and West Virginia University

In most stand-alone universities and colleges in the United States, the chief executive officer is called the president, while the second-most senior officer is called the provost, vice president of academic affairs, dean of faculties, or some other similar title.

The executive and ceremonial roles are not split in the US, with the university president having a wide breadth of duties and responsibilities. The president is expected to preside over all major ceremonies, including graduations and presentations of awards and honors, while also reporting to the board of trustees and personally handling certain high-level executive functions: external relations (especially public relations and fundraising) and long-range planning and strategy (especially the creation and termination of university degrees, programs, and policies). Most other decisions are delegated to the provost, especially operational day-to-day decisions. The provost often has the final say on resource allocation decisions, difficult tenure decisions, whether to initiate recruiting of star faculty from other institutions, and whether to initiate defensive measures against such recruiting of the institution's own star faculty.

University presidents typically ascend to the position from academic careers (i.e., after earning tenure and becoming professors and then deans), and it is highly unusual for a university to recruit a president who lacks a strong track record in academic research or university administration.

The average salary for college presidents in private, non-profit institutions in 2015 was $569,932, 9 percent higher than in 2014.

There are well-known problems with the American tradition of concentrating so much power and responsibility in a single person. American universities do not train faculty members and administrators to assume such a heavy burden. This leaves university presidents vulnerable to occupational burnout, either returning to the faculty or leaving academia for other nonprofit work or consulting. The average length of an American university president's term of office dropped from 8.5 years in 2006 to 5.9 years in 2023.

== Vice-chancellor ==
The vice-chancellor is normally the chief executive of a university. In some countries, the title is used by the chief executive as a deputy for the chancellor in a ceremonial role, with a different title such as president or principal for their executive role.

== See also ==
- Lists of university leaders
