= 1988 New Year Honours (New Zealand) =

Annual awards for New Zealanders

The 1988 New Year Honours in New Zealand were appointments by Elizabeth II on the advice of the New Zealand government to various orders and honours to reward and highlight good works by New Zealanders. The awards celebrated the passing of 1987 and the beginning of 1988, and were announced on 31 December 1987.

The recipients of honours are displayed here as they were styled before their new honour.

== Knight Bachelor ==
- John Mokonuiarangi Bennett QSO – of Havelock North. For services to education.
- Ronald Alfred Brierley – of Wellington. For services to business management and the community. (Note: Knighthood resigned, and subsequently cancelled and annulled, in 2021.)
- Murray Gordon Halberg MBE – of Waiheke Island. For services to sport and crippled children.
- The Honourable (Mr Justice) James Peter Quilliam – of Wellington; judge of the High Court.
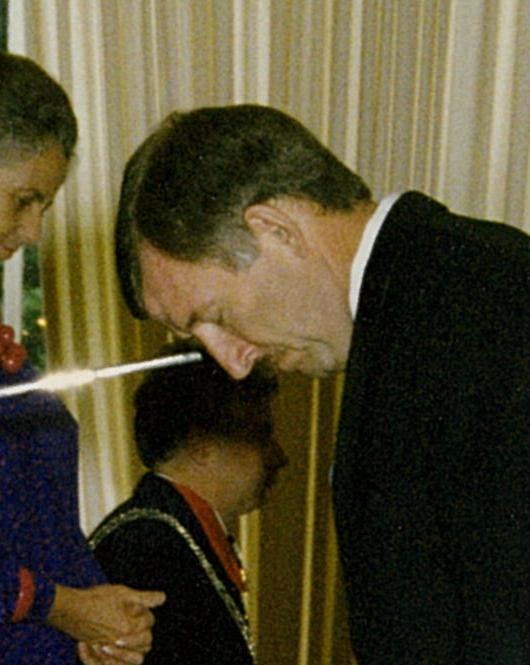
Ron Brierley

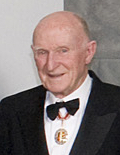
Sir Murray Halberg

== Order of the Bath ==
=== Companion (CB) ===
Military division

- Air Vice-Marshal Patrick Neville OBE AFC – Royal New Zealand Air Force; Chief of Air Staff.

== Order of Saint Michael and Saint George ==
=== Dame Commander (DCMG) ===
- The Honourable (Margaret) Ann Hercus – of Christchurch. For public services.
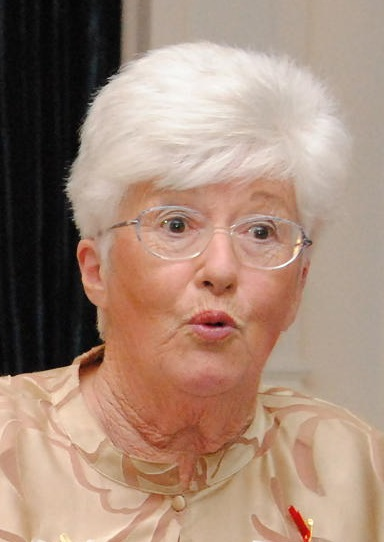
Dame Ann Hercus

=== Companion (CMG) ===
- Charles Frederick Sutton Caldwell – of Christchurch. For services to education and the community.
- John William Harris Clark – of Wainuiomata; Secretary of Trade and Industry.
- John Thomas Kneebone – of Tīrau. For public services and services to agriculture.
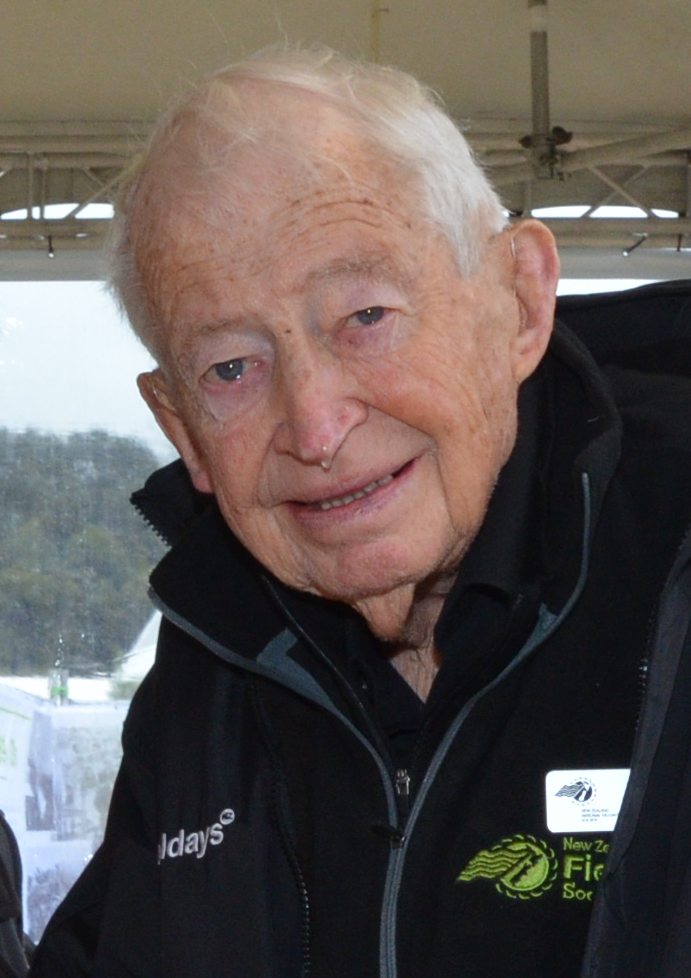
John Kneebone

== Order of the British Empire ==
=== Knight Commander (KBE) ===
Civil division

- Professor Philip John Scott – of Auckland. For services to medicine.

=== Commander (CBE) ===
Civil division

- The Honourable John Philip Cook OBE ED – of Christchurch; lately a judge of the High Court.
- Emeritus Professor Lloyd George Geering – of Wellington. For services to religious studies.
- Anne Therese Nightingale – of Auckland. For services to nursing.
- Professor John Derek Kingsley North – of Auckland. For services to medicine.
- John Hayward Oakley – of Lower Hutt. For services to cricket.
- William Leslie Renwick – of Wellington; Director-General of Education.
- Bernadette Mary Richardson – of Christchurch. For services to the community.

Military division

- Major-General Kenneth Montrose Gordon OBE – Generals' List, New Zealand Army.
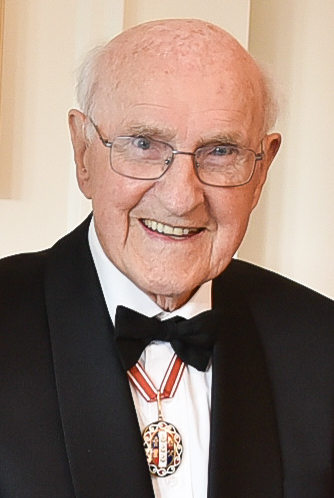
Lloyd Geering

=== Officer (OBE) ===
Civil division

- Anthony Gordon Benfell – of Auckland. For services to singing.
- Ian Barry Brickell – of Coromandel. For services to pottery and ceramics.
- Beatrice Mary Joye Evans – of Palmerston North. For services to the Girl Guide movement.
- Edward Max Friedlander – of Dunedin. For services to the community.
- Dr James Ritchie Gilmour – of Auckland. For services to obstetrics and the community.
- George Winiata Henare – of Auckland. For services to the performing arts.
- John Anderson Jamieson – Deputy Commissioner, New Zealand Police.
- Professor Leslie Kay – of Russell. For services to electrical and electronic engineering.
- Fiona Judith Kidman – of Wellington. For services to literature.
- Dr Michael King – of Auckland. For services to literature.
- Bernard Keith Knowles – of Wellington. For services to the dairy and wool industries.
- Elsie Ngahuia McInnes – of Havelock North. For services to the community.
- Stanley Walter Alexander Ralston – of Wellington; Valuer-General, Department of Valuation. For public service.
- Gordon William Robert Sharrock – of Wanganui. For services to cycling.
- Alfred Edward Tarrant – of Wellington. For services to manufacturing.
- Robert John Todd JP – of Christchurch. For services to trade union affairs and the community.
- Alan John Young – of Mount Maunganui. For services to the education of the deaf.

Military division

- Lieutenant-Colonel James Roland McGregor – Royal New Zealand Infantry Regiment (Territorial Force).
- Group Captain Peter James Hughan – Royal New Zealand Air Force.
- Group Captain Donald William Pawson AFC – Royal New Zealand Air Force.
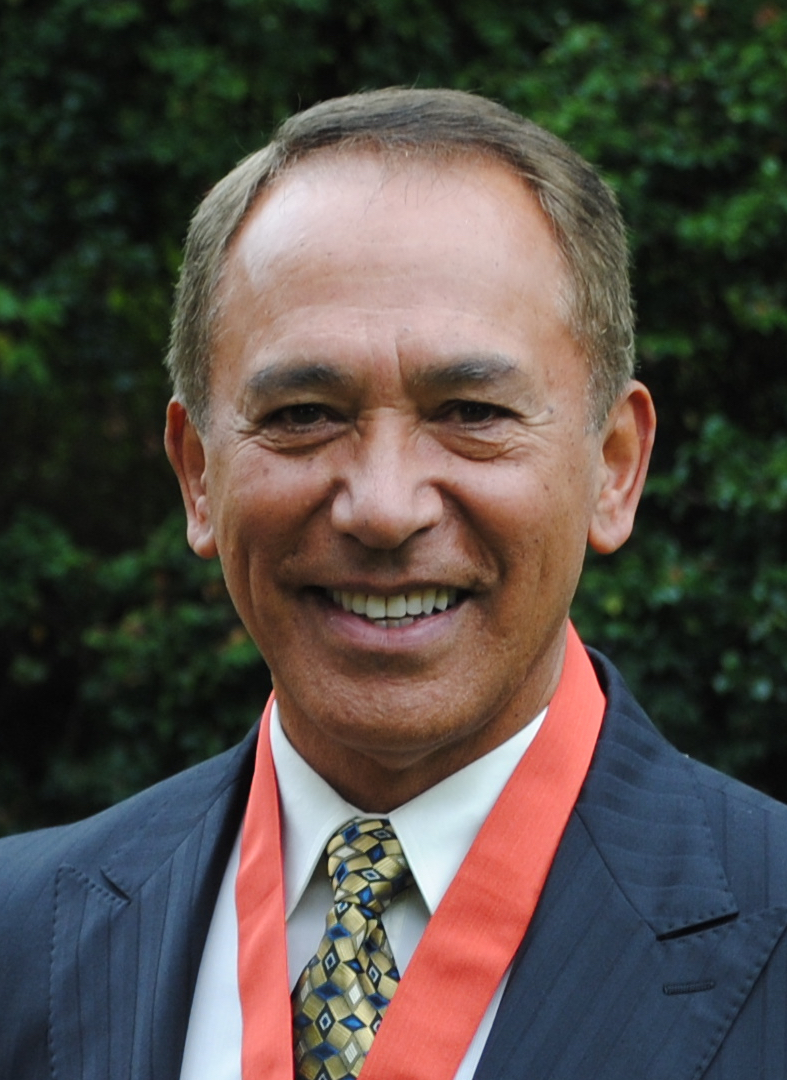
George Henare

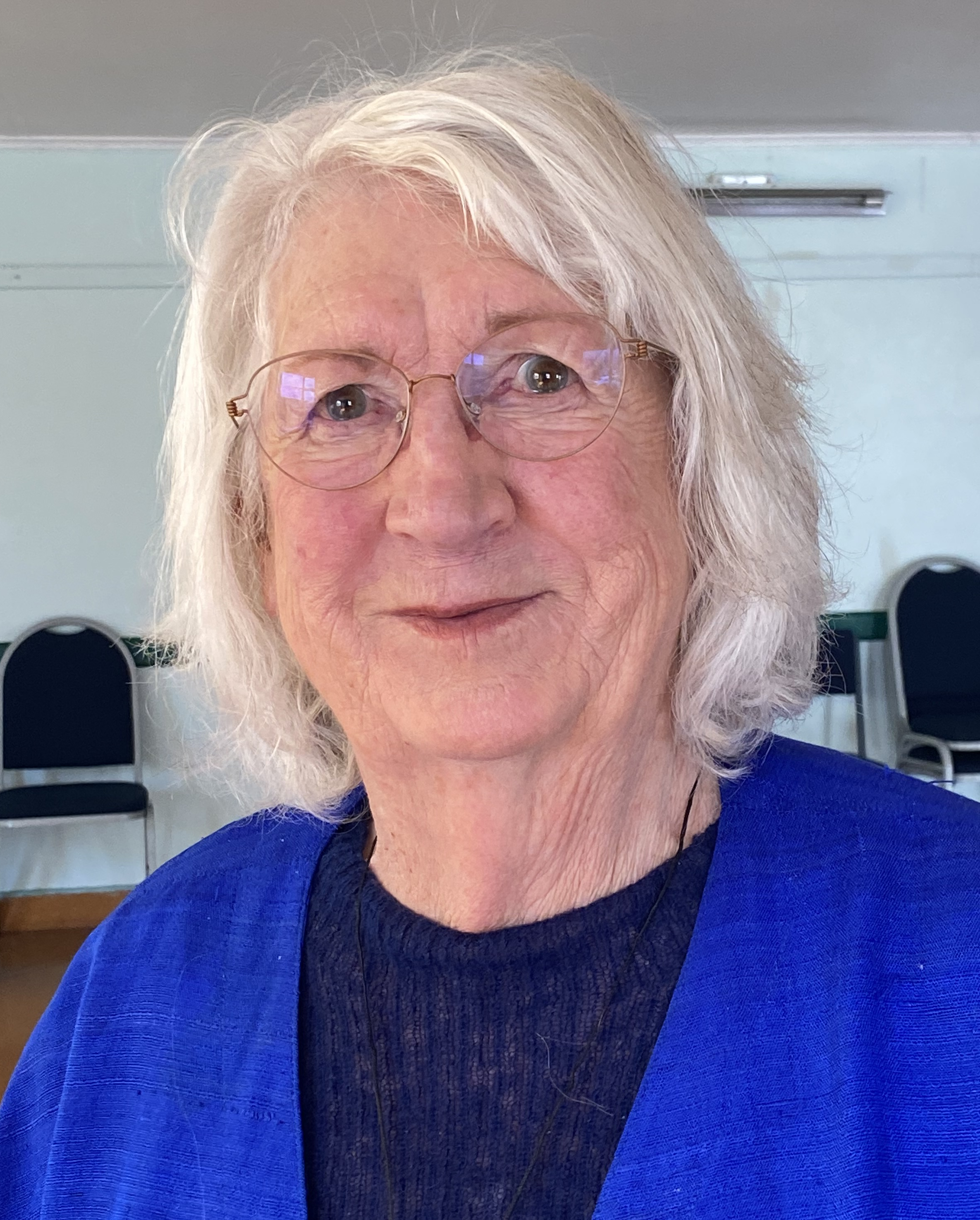
Fiona Kidman

=== Member (MBE) ===
Civil division

- Ralph Thomas Adams – of Trentham; lately director of the New Zealand Wildlife Service.
- Byron Buick-Constable – of Wellington. For services to the disabled.
- Robert Norman Byrne JP – of Whakatāne. For services to the community.
- Eric Alexander Craies – of Auckland. For services to rowing.
- Peter McElwain Faulkner ED – superintendent, New Zealand Police.
- Josephine Lynette Hartley – of Kawerau. For services to the community.
- George Stanley Derek Heather – of Hamilton. For services to local government.
- Marie Alice Hopkins – of Christchurch. For services to the community.
- Edward Patrick Hoult – of Lower Hutt. For services to education.
- George Bendigo Hurst – of Tākaka. For services to dairy industry and the community.
- Dr David Edward Kirk – of Oxford, England. For services to rugby.
- Stanley Arthur Lay – of New Plymouth. For services to sport.
- Christopher Paul MacDonald – of Auckland. For services to canoeing.
- Ngaire MacLean – of Dunedin. For services to the community.
- Lawrence Albert Mahoney – of Christchurch. For services to rugby.
- Heather Jean Matthews – of Auckland. For services to athletics.
- Elizabeth Carolyn Miller – of Invercargill. For services to the community.
- Thomas Parsonage – of Huntly. For services to sport and the community.
- Peter Anderson Smith – of Auckland. For services to the community.
- Dr Raymond Harry Spitz – of Auckland. For services to the Hebrew community.
- Victor Michael Sunde – of Auckland. For services to the fruit growing industry.
- John Henry Thorby JP – of Tūrangi. For services to local government and the community.
- Grant Leonard Ridgway Tilly – of Wellington. For services to the theatre.
- Leslie Dawson Wright – of Martinborough. For services to local government.

Military division

- Warrant Officer Kenneth William Last-Harris – Royal New Zealand Navy.
- Major Jessie Muriel Mary Gunn – Royal New Zealand Corps of Transport.
- Warrant Officer Class I Denis John King – Royal New Zealand Infantry Regiment.
- Warrant Officer Cedric Crosse Shatter – Royal New Zealand Air Force.
Stan Lay

== British Empire Medal (BEM) ==
Military division

- Chief Petty Officer Kenneth John Cook – Royal New Zealand Navy.
- Staff Sergeant Matekino Pop Shelford – New Zealand Army.
- Flight Sergeant Dennis William Kelland – Royal New Zealand Air Force.

== Companion of the Queen's Service Order (QSO) ==
=== For community service ===
- Margaret Dunmore – of Auckland.
- The Very Reverend Kenape Faletoese – of Wellington.
- Beverley Jean Morris – of Wellington.
- Diggeress Rangituatahi Te Kanawa – of Te Kūiti.
- Brian William Woodward – of Nelson.

=== For public services ===
- Bruce Craig Beetham – of Marton.
- Geoffrey John Geering JP – of Ashburton.
- Warren Neil Hawkey – of Lower Hutt; lately Director-General and Surveyor-General, Department of Survey and Land Information.
- Dinah Holman – of Auckland.
- Daniel Mearns Holmes JP – of Ōpunake.
- Edward Emanuel Isbey – of Auckland.
- Trevor Percival Kelly – of Auckland.
- Daniel Joseph Moran – of Kemang, Indonesia.
- Maxwell Keith Mynott Taylor – of Gisborne.
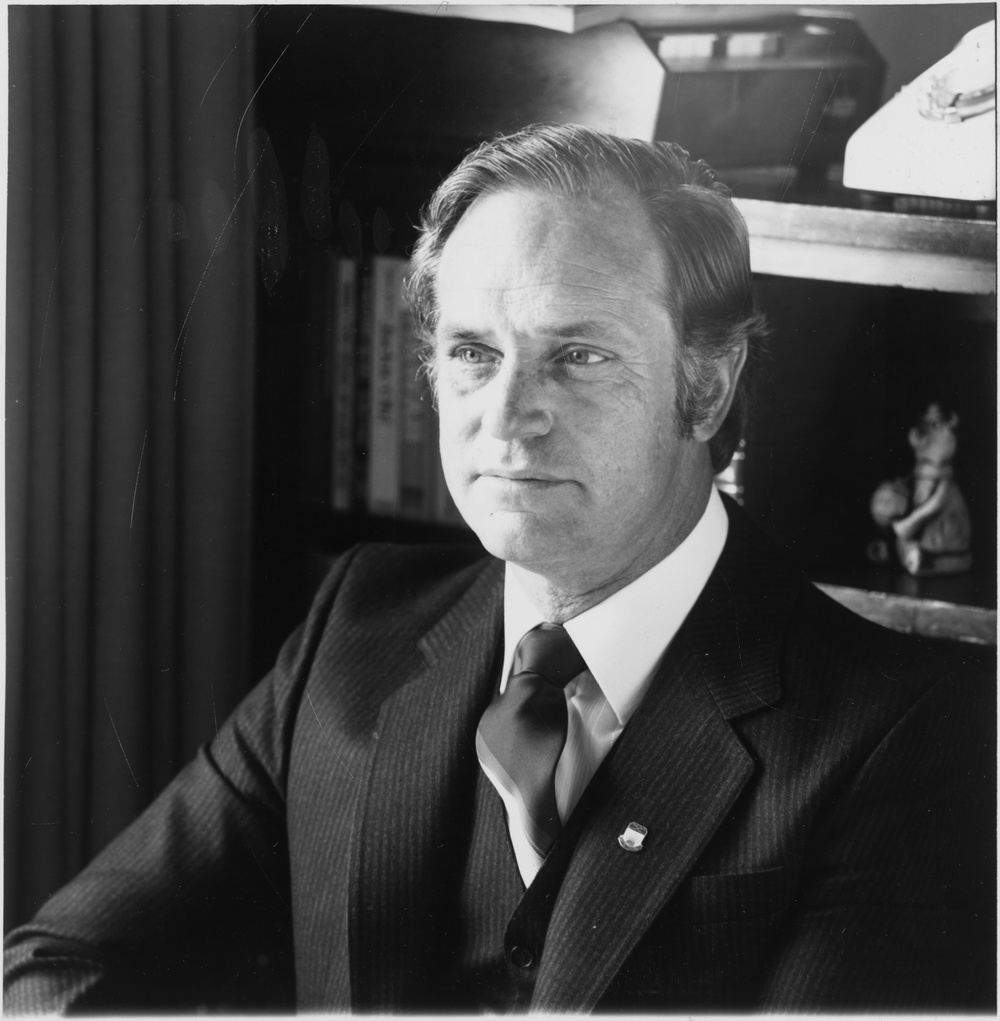
Bruce Beetham

== Queen's Service Medal (QSM) ==
=== For community service ===
- Antony Aylwin Baker – of Cape Jackson.
- Betty Baker – of Cape Jackson.
- Elva Lilian Bett – of Wellington.
- Richard George (Peter) Campbell – of Auckland.
- Bruce Edward Dawe – of Christchurch.
- Tiramate Frankie Dennis – of Auckland.
- Euan Evan Dunlop – of Christchurch.
- Margaret Rose Gadson – of Auckland.
- Kathleen Ruby Harris – of Nelson.
- Te Ripowai Pauline Higgins – of Wainuiomata.
- Philippa Sylvia Howden – of Masterton.
- Marion Rodger Gilchrist Kendrick – of Whakatāne.
- John Frederick George Lawson – of Christchurch.
- Pauline Patricia Leathem – of Christchurch.
- Elsie Maud Lloyd – of Raumati Beach.
- Christina McAnulty (Sister Christina) – of Christchurch.
- Margaret Clemance McEwen – of Timaru.
- Doreen Veronica McMahon – of Christchurch.
- Elizabeth June Meade – of Gisborne.
- Frank Ernest Leslie Mitchell – of Christchurch.
- Gertrude Harete (Kahu) Morrison – of Rotorua.
- Herbert David Mullon – of New Plymouth.
- Joyce Ellen Nicholson – of Levin.
- Robert Michael Bertram Oliver – of Wellington.
- Ramesh Unka Patel – of Auckland.
- Reginald John Perkins – of Plimmerton.
- Paekiomeka Joy Ruha – of Wellington.
- Clifford Smith – of Auckland.
- Leslie Andrews Strong – of Christchurch.
- Elia Taukifaga Tinielu – of Porirua.
- The Reverend Sampson Ngatiterauwawe Toia JP – of Dargaville.
- Ray (Rade) Vuksich – of Auckland.
- Colin Vernon Wheeler – of Oamaru.
- Jeanie Wilson – of Wanganui.
Te Ripowai Higgins

=== For public services ===
- Alister Scott Abernethy JP – of Lower Hutt.
- Ann Herangi Barham JP – of Te Awamutu.
- Gordon David Bell – of Christchurch; deputy station rescue fire officer, Ministry of Transport.
- Myra Ringa Urunga Berghan – of Awanui.
- Selina Emily Burrage – of Christchurch.
- Jean Myrtle Caird – of Timaru.
- Jack Critchley – of Wellington; lately chief engineer surveyor and surveyor of ships, Ministry of Transport.
- Stanley Petrie Dawson – senior constable, New Zealand Police.
- Dorothy Millicent Dutton – of Auckland; clinical specialist, Middlemore Hospital.
- Maurice Christopher Eathorne – senior constable, New Zealand Police.
- Nell Elizabeth Ehau – of Auckland.
- The Reverend Lawrence Albert Grosse – of Auckland.
- Geoffrey Robert Hammond – of Whangaparaoa.
- William Alfred Hart JP – of Ashburton.
- Beryl Ena Kelly – of Auckland.
- James Alistair Lindsay – of Mosgiel.
- Frederick Mangnall – of Auckland.
- Brian Ignatius Maybury – of Auckland; head chauffeur, Public Service Garage, NZ Post Ltd, Auckland.
- Annie May Meadowcroft JP – of Christchurch.
- Kathleen May Munro – of Port Chalmers.
- Moeroa O Daniela Iti (Rangi) Oberg JP – of Christchurch.
- Amusia Patea – of Atafu, Tokelau.
- Lyndsay John Proctor – senior constable, New Zealand Police.
- Ngaire Winifred Quennell – of Dunedin.
- Professor Emeritus Ernest Johnstone Searle ED – of Whangaparaoa.
- Terence Henry Small – of Manurewa.
- Robert William Stanic JP – of Whangaparaoa.
- Archie Cooper Taylor JP – of Oamaru.
- William MacDonald Taylor – of Waimamaku.
- Basil Phillip Vertongen – of Foxton.
- John Patrick Wilson – of Marton.
- Helen Mary Wily – of Christchurch.
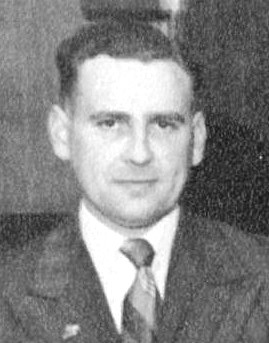
Alister Abernethy

== Queen's Fire Service Medal (QFSM) ==
- Desmond Ernest Hide – district commander and chief fire officer, Cust Volunteer Fire Brigade, New Zealand Fire Service.
- Barrie Maxwell O'Donnell – senior station officer, Volunteer Section, Palmerston North Fire Brigade, New Zealand Fire Service.
- Walter West – fire commander, National Headquarters, New Zealand Fire Service.

== Queen's Police Medal (QPM) ==
- Anthony Milos Letica – inspector, New Zealand Police.
