= John Hood (university administrator) =

New Zealand academic administrator (1952–2026)

Sir John Hood KNZM
- Hood in 2014

Vice-Chancellor of the University of Oxford
- In office 5 October 2004 – 30 September 2009
- Chancellor: Chris Patten
- Preceded by: Colin Lucas
- Succeeded by: Andrew D. Hamilton

Vice-Chancellor of the University of Auckland
- In office 1999 – 31 June 2004
- Chancellor: John Graham
- Preceded by: Kit Carson
- Succeeded by: Stuart McCutcheon

Personal details
- Born: John Antony Hood; 2 January 1952 Napier, New Zealand
- Died: 18 November 2026 (aged 74)
- Education: University of Auckland; Worcester College, Oxford

Sir John Antony Hood (2 January 1952 – 18 November 2026) was a New Zealand businessman and administrator. He was vice-chancellor of the University of Oxford from 5 October 2004 to 30 September 2009. He was the first vice-chancellor to be elected from outside Oxford's academic body in 900 years, and the first to have addressed the scholars' congregation via a webcast.

In March 2007, New Zealand prime minister Helen Clark awarded him the World Class New Zealand supreme award to honour his contribution to profiling New Zealand and New Zealanders internationally.

== Early life and education ==
Hood was born on 2 January 1952 in Napier, New Zealand. Both his parents were schoolteachers. His father, George Hood, began as the teaching headmaster of the primary school in the Gisborne District settlement of Whatatutu and finished his career at North Shore Teachers' College and Takapuna Normal Intermediate. His mother, Frances Hood, was a physical education specialist.

He attended Westlake Boys High School in Auckland from 1965 to 1969 where he was deputy head prefect was dux in his final year. He won the Rowan P. Kelly Memorial Prize in English in 1968 and 1969, and contributed to sports in the school as a 1st XI hockey player and 1st X1 cricket captain. One of the six school houses at Westlake is named after him (Hood House).

From 1970 to 1976, Hood attended the University of Auckland where he graduated with a Bachelor of Engineering degree in 1972 and a PhD in civil engineering in 1976. His doctoral thesis was entitled "A theoretical and experimental investigation of a curved, single cell box-girder bridge". He was then awarded a Rhodes Scholarship to Oxford, where he was a member of Worcester College and studied for an MPhil in management. He played first-class cricket for Oxford University in 1977.

== Career ==
=== Career in New Zealand ===
He held a number of directorships in prominent New Zealand companies and bodies, including Fonterra, Fletcher Challenge and the New Zealand Cricket review of 1995.

=== Fletcher Challenge ===
Hood first entered the Fletcher business on a Fletcher Construction Company engineering cadetship, a non-bonded scholarship which, in return, saw Hood working on construction sites around New Zealand during university vacations.

From 1979 to 1997, he worked for Fletcher Challenge Limited and its predecessor business, Fletcher Holdings Limited. His first role for the Fletcher business was in 1979, as projects officer in the executive directors' Department of Fletcher Holdings. By the end of his 19-year tenure with the company, he was a member of the Fletcher Challenge executive office, with responsibilities in the pulp and paper (1995-1997), building (1993-1995) and primary (1993) industries. He was regarded as a potential successor to Hugh Fletcher, then CEO of the company, but departed the business in 1997 when this did not eventuate. The period of his career at Fletcher Challenge is described in the book Battle of the Titans by Bruce Wallace.

Roderick Deane, former Fletcher chairman, recalls about Hood: "He was somebody who knew how to deliver. John has an old-fashioned sense of courtliness to him. It's something you don't see a lot of these days, and certainly not in the corporate world."

During this period he also played an important role in developing the Fletcher Challenge Art Collection.

=== New Zealand Cricket Review (1995) ===
New Zealand Cricket was emerging from a difficult centenary season marked by lost prestige, rebellious players, hostile media and administrative dysfunction. Hood was asked to review its governance and management. His recommendations were sufficiently radical to threaten established interests, yet they were accepted.

The New Zealand Cricket chairman, Peter McDermott, stated that if he or another board member had produced the report it would have been dismissed. "But the fact that John Hood had prepared it gave us enormous credibility. His credibility was the reason we were able to change." Hood could make difficult recommendations credible enough to be accepted by people who were potentially threatened by them.

The cricket episode provides a case study for Hood's leadership method: understand the culture; diagnose the underlying structural problem; develop a solution that challenges entrenched interests; establish personal credibility; and build sufficient consensus to implement the change.

=== University of Auckland ===
From 1999 to 2004, Hood was vice-chancellor of the University of Auckland. When he left Fletcher Challenge and became vice-chancellor of the university in 1999, he was not the conventional choice to lead a major university. He had spent 19 years in industry, rising to senior executive responsibility within one of New Zealand's largest companies.

Hood arrived at Auckland when the university faced financial and infrastructure problems. The university's own history records that governments had progressively reduced tuition subsidies per student, while the institution needed to reactivate a building programme.

Hood initially understood that an outsider could not simply arrive at a university and impose corporate management techniques. He therefore spent considerable time meeting people, visiting departments and listening. The North & South profile notes that Hood's commitment to understanding the university's people and organisation during his first year helped win over even radical and initially disaffected staff.

The North & South magazine credits Hood with having improved financial management, strengthened research investment, developed strategic plans, introduced transparent research-investment tracking, upgraded facilities and developed long-term capital planning, and introduced processes that had not previously existed across the university.

The contemporary assessment in The Guardian makes the same point: although he arrived as a businessman and outsider, observers argued that he had turned what could have been liabilities into strengths, demonstrating that business and academic interests could be better served by working together. Peter Gluckman, director of Auckland's Liggins Institute, observed: "John has taken this university from a place where it had its head up its ivory tower behind, if I can put it that way, straight into the real world."

Hood resisted focusing research excellence on science and technology. He argued that social sciences and humanities research also needed an environment in which they could flourish. In his own words, quoted in The Guardian: "It's really important, while we're discussing research strengths and development, to mention the importance of balancing this kind of work right across the disciplines. I have been equally concerned to create an environment where the research of social scientists and humanities scholars ... can thrive and flourish as well."

The University of Auckland's 2004 annual report said that Hood's five years of achievement were "without parallel" and credited him with giving the university "a shared purpose, momentum and a determination to achieve" that had been almost unimaginable when he began.

During his tenure, he was named by North & South as the 2002 New Zealander of the Year.

==== Catching the Knowledge Wave conference (2001) ====
While in the vice-chancellor role at the University of Auckland, Hood co-chaired, along with the then prime minister, Helen Clark, the 2001 Catching the Knowledge Wave conference. Said to be one of the largest meetings of minds to take place in New Zealand history, the conference was attended by 450 delegates and 37 national and international speakers and expatriate New Zealanders - academics, officials, politicians, economists and business leaders - discussing how to lift economic performance in New Zealand. North & South assessed that having the prime minister as co-chair gave the event the political weight necessary to turn what might otherwise have been a relatively obscure university conference into a national event.

Hood believed that New Zealand's discussion of the "knowledge economy" had become largely political rhetoric and wanted the country to understand what the concept actually meant for economic and social policy. His objective was captured in his own words :"If political parties are going to talk about 'knowledge' then it's important our broader society knows what the terms mean, what they imply in terms of policy development. We wanted to raise the level of understanding and debate in our country." The conference was a catalyst for the realisation that New Zealand could no longer remain primarily a producer of agricultural commodities but instead must transform itself int a high-value, knowledge-based economy. North & South stated that "The Knowledge Wave ... opened a dialogue between the university, private sector companies, the public and government."

The initiative also continued beyond the conference itself. The Knowledge Wave Trust was subsequently established, and the university and trust collaborated on the Knowledge Wave Leadership Forum in 2003.

==== Chris Patten and the road to Oxford ====
In April 2003, while still vice-chancellor of the University of Auckland, Hood hosted Sir Chris Patten, then the European Union External Relations Commissioner and newly elected chancellor of Oxford Universtiy. The meeting ostensibly concerned New Zealand's relationship with Europe and the opportunities offered by the larger European Market. The University of Auckland had close links with the University of Oxford, and Hood aimed to establish a relationship with Patten in his new role as chancellor. Hood told The New Zealand Herald that about a week after Patten returned to Britain, he was informed that Oxford intended to consider him for the role of vice-chancellor.

Patten was not a member of the selection panel for Hood's appointment, the formal selection was undertaken by a committee chaired by Sir Victor Blank, following an open recruitment process and worldwide search. Nevertheless, the Herald reported that Patten's reaction to Hood's candidacy would have carried considerable weight.

The Guardian noted that Hood was "the first outsider ever chosen to lead the University of Oxford" and may yet prove to be "the most significant infusion of foreign blood for the venerable institution since Emo of Friesland became its first overseas student, in 1190."

=== University of Oxford ===
From 2004 to 2009, Hood was vice-chancellor of the University of Oxford. Hood's appointment was controversial as he was the first external appointee.

By 2004, Oxford University had become 'a vast and intensely complex organisation, comparable in scope to a very big corporation but with far more social obligations'. In order to address the university's financial difficulties at the time, Hood proposed to reform the 900-year-old tradition of complete self-governance by introducing a number of external members to council, and by separating academic and financial boards. The initial proposal, fully endorsed by Chris Patten, called for a majority of external members of council, bringing Oxford into line with all other UK universities except the University of Cambridge.

Opponents claimed that the reform would place too much power in the hands of the vice-chancellor. Other critics questioned the applicability of corporate models of governance in educational institutions. Chris Patten stated in December 2006 that without reforms to Oxford's governance it would be more difficult to raise money he said was needed by the university, particularly with respect to needs-based funding to support students from poorer backgrounds. Hood stated at the time that the issue was not "whether there has to be change, but what kind of change". Following a two-hour debate, the proposal was amended by Congregation to allow the election of a college fellow, a further insider, to the council within five years, resulting in a majority of eight insiders (including the vice-chancellor) on the 15-member council. The amendment was supported by a majority of votes (657 to 502), but was defeated when brought to vote by Congregation on 28 November 2006, by 730 to 456 votes with a further defeat in a postal vote of all 3000 members. Hood stated that he would not treat the defeat as a vote of no confidence, citing a need to "put aside division, continue dialogue with all shades of opinion and, in an atmosphere of trust, tolerance and goodwill, promote the academic aims and ideals of Oxford".

In 2007, to resolve the financial management issue, Oxford University Endowment Management was established, an independent, regulated, commercial and operating subsidiary of the university responsible for manging over £6 billion of charitable endowments.

Dame Louise Richardson (Oxford's vice- chancellor 2016-2023) wrote that "It is impossible to do justice to John’s innumerable and significant contributions to the University in a few words. Among many other things, he completely revamped the University’s finances. He overhauled and rationalised the system and the University revenue rose 70% during his tenure. John completely transformed the administrative infrastructure of the University, without which none of our subsequent success would have been possible." Oxford vice chancellor, Irene Tracey said: "I was always so impressed by his ability to juggle significant University business, external global relations and yet remain accessible and aware of individual staff members. He has left us in such a better place, that his successors have all benefitted from and built on." Andrew Graham (former master of Balliol College and warden of Rhodes House), who had originally objected to Hood's reforms, added "What shines out for me is first, and foremost, his complete integrity. However, energy, resilience, speed and determination all come a very close second."

When Hood affirmed that he would not extend his term beyond five years (despite a recent change to regulations to allow a further two years), Chris Patten wrote that "John Hood is doing a remarkable job as Vice-Chancellor. Under his leadership the University's global reputation, academic standing, financial strength, and internal organisation are all continuing to advance. Two of the hallmarks of his tenure are the clarity of his vision and the strength of his commitment."

For the unveiling of the official portrait of Hood by Paul Brason on 3 December 2009, Oxford University published the following:

"Major capital initiatives commenced or completed under John Hood’s leadership

- Improvement of the University administration, previously under considerable pressure. Former management deficiencies in wide management accounting have been addressed. The administration is now stronger and better equipped to serve the academic mission and scholarly aspiration of the University.
- Ambitious capital development projects, including the Stelios Ioannou Centre for Classical and Byzantine Studies, The Innovation Centre and the Institute of Advanced Technology Building and Begbroke, Oxford e-Science Building, new Biochemistry Building, the Old Road Campus cancer centre, new teaching and research space for Queen Elizabeth House, renovations of the Ashmolean and Pitt Rivers Museums, Tubney House (the new rural headquarters of WildCRU), The Khalil Research Centre for the Art and Material Culture of the Middle East, Radcliffe Observatory Masterplan, strategies for the transformation of the Bodleian Libraries through the Book Storage Facility, the metamorphosis of the New Bodleian into the Western Library, and plans for the Humanities and Mathematics Library. Other projects of note are the significant refurbishments of research space throughout the Science Area, including in Plant Sciences, Zoology, Physics, and Psychology and at Iffley Road where the Sir Roger Bannister Running Track was resurfaced. The new Earth Sciences Building, when it is completed in 2010 will provide the University with world-class teaching and research facilities.

Significant achievements during the Vice-Chancellorship of John Hood

- Oxford is at the top of every domestic league table (2009)
- Oxford’s RAE settlement and outcome was the highest in the sector
- Research revenue in 2008-09 totalled £467 million which represented a 21% increase on the previous year
- Research growth, which has seen the creation of almost fifty new centres and institutes
- Many new graduate programmes, with academic staff increasing by 23.4%
- Undergraduate applications are up 24%; postgraduate student numbers have increased by 30%
- Donations totalling £770 million to the collegiate University have been recorded
- The subvention by OUP of £100.7 million in 2008-09 was the highest annual sum transferred to the University from the Press
- 5 victories in the annual Oxford vs. Cambridge Varsity Ice Hockey. Cambridge Boat Race]] (one disputed)
- Financial, academic and strategic planning has been formalised and strengthened
- The governance mechanisms of the Conference of Colleges have been strengthened and better integrated with those of the University"

Andrew Hamilton, who had previously served as the Provost of Yale University, was nominated on 3 June 2008 to succeed John Hood as Vice-Chancellor of Oxford University from 1 October 2009. His appointment was confirmed on 16 June 2008.

=== Additional career ===
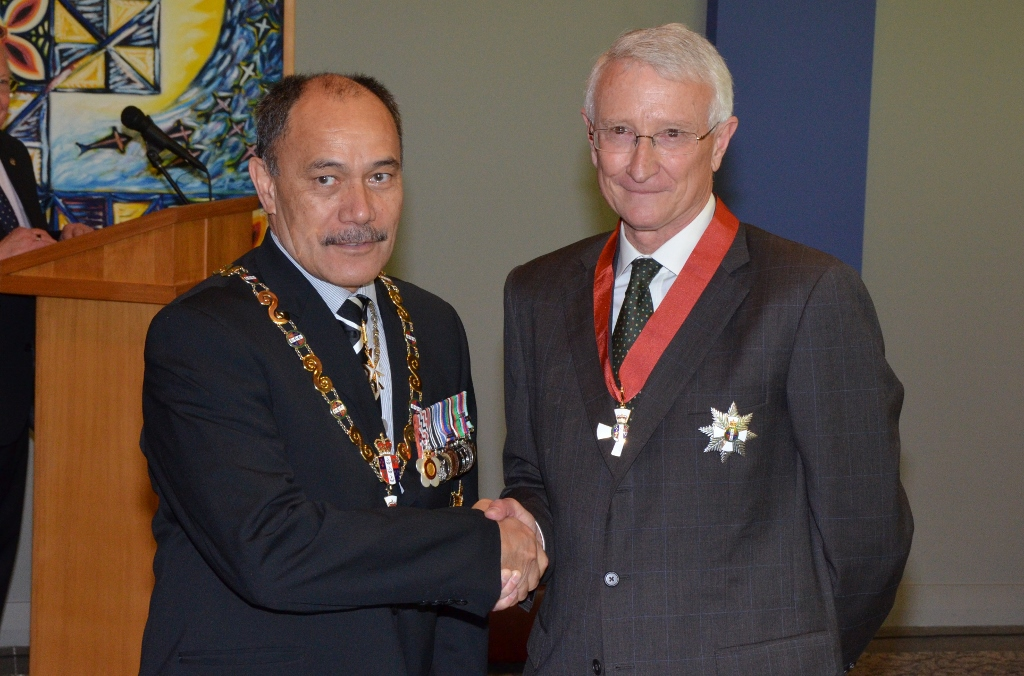
Hood (right) in 2014, after his investiture as a Knight Companion of the New Zealand Order of Merit by the governor-general, Sir Jerry Mateparae

Hood was president and chief executive pfficer of the Robertson Foundation from 2010.

Hood was governor of the New Zealand Sports Foundation. He chaired the High-Performance Sport Transition Committee, the NZ Cricket Review Committee, the America's Cup Task Force, the Knowledge Wave Trust, Tonkin and Taylor Ltd, the Rhodes Trustees, Urenco Ltd, Study Group Ltd, and Teach For all, Matakina (now Volpara) Ltd.

Hood was director of several NZ, UK and U.S. organisations including Fonterra Co-operative Group, ASB Bank Ltd and ASB Bank Group, Sealord Group, Sky City Ltd, BG Group Plc, Aurora Energy Research, WPP plc, BMT Group, and Blackstone Inc, the UK DTI Strategy Board, Alexander von Humboldt Foundation Advisory Board, League of European Research Universities Executive Committee member, UK Schools Capital Review Steering Group member, and the Lund University Advisory Board.

Hood was on the council of honorary members of the Blavatnik School of Government and was a trustee emeritus of the Rhodes Trust.

== Research awards and grants ==
- In the 2014 Queen's Birthday Honours, Hood was appointed a Knight Companion of the New Zealand Order of Merit (KNZM) for services to tertiary education.
- Rhodes Scholar (1976-1978)
- Global leader of Tomorrow (World Economic Forum, 1994)
- New Zealander of the Year (North and South Magazine, 2001)
- LLD (Hon) The University of Auckland, (2004)
- Hon Doc Beida University, (2005)
- LLD (Hon) UBC (University of British Colombia, 2006)
- PhD (Hon) (Business Administration) Korea University, (2008)
- Fellow of the Institution of Professional Engineers NZ (Hon), FIPENZ
- Fellow of the NZ Institute of Management, FNZIM
- Paul Harris Fellow, Rotary Foundation, (2004)
- Hon Fellow, Worcester College, Oxford, (2003)
- Hon Fellow, Templeton College, Oxford, (2004)
- Hon Fellow, St Anne’s College, Oxford, (2009)
- Hon Fellow, All Souls College, Oxford,
- World Class New Zealander Award, (2007)
- Fellow, Royal Institute of Chartered Surveyors, (2008)
- Sir Peter Blake Medal, (2009)

=== Trusteeships and voluntary commitments ===
Hood was trustee of the British Heart Foundation, the Judith Binney Trust, the Mandela Rhodes Foundation, the Fletcher Trust, Singapore Management University, the Said Business School Foundation and the Asia 2000 Foundation. He was also a member of the Chatham House Fellowships Advisory Committee and global director of Universitas 21.

== Charitable foundation ==
Established by the University of Auckland in 2004, the Hood Fellowship Fund recognises Hood's vice-chancellorship at the university. The stated key purpose of the fellowship is to maintain and enhance the international standing and performance of the University of Auckland as New Zealand's premier research-led university. The fund provides travelling fellowships of up to $25,000 NZD which support academic staff to take short-term research at prominent international institutions, and visiting fellowships which support overseas academics to visit the University of Auckland.

== Personal life and death ==
Hood had three children. His wife, Emma, Lady Hood, was a contemporary of Theresa May at St Hugh's College, Oxford.

Hood died on 18 November 2026, aged 74.

== See also ==
- List of Vice-Chancellors of the University of Oxford
- List of Vice-Chancellors of the University of Auckland
- List of Rhodes Scholars

== Bibliography ==
- Wallace, Bruce (2001). Battle of the Titans. Auckland: Penguin Books (NZ) Ltd. ISBN 0-14-100472-X.

Academic offices
Preceded by Kit Carson	Vice-Chancellor of the University of Auckland; 1998–2004	Succeeded by Stuart McCutcheon
Preceded by Sir Colin Lucas	Vice-Chancellor of Oxford University; 2004–2009	Succeeded by Andrew D. Hamilton
