= Helen Wily =

New Zealand statistician and mathematician

Helen Wily QSM
- Born: Helen Mary Harrison; 27 April 1921
- Died: 12 September 2009 (aged 88)
- Spouse: Henry Alden Lascelles Wily

Helen Mary Wily QSM (née Harrison; 27 April 1921 – 12 September 2009) was a New Zealand statistician and mathematician. With Sharleen Forbes she ran the first session on gender issues in statistics education, at the third International Conference on Teaching Statistics held in 1990 at the University of Otago. She was a strong advocate of equal pay issues in the public service. She was very involved with the Christchurch branch of the New Zealand Federation of Graduate Women.

In the 1988 New Year Honours, Wily was awarded the Queen's Service Medal for public services.

== Academic career ==
Wily taught mathematics at Rangi Ruru Girls' School then for ten years she trained students in teaching mathematics at Christchurch College of Education, then later moved to the Christchurch Polytechnic Institute of Technology.

== Selected works ==
Wily published several works on women in mathematics.
