= John Kneebone =

New Zealand farming leader (1935–2020)

John Kneebone CMG
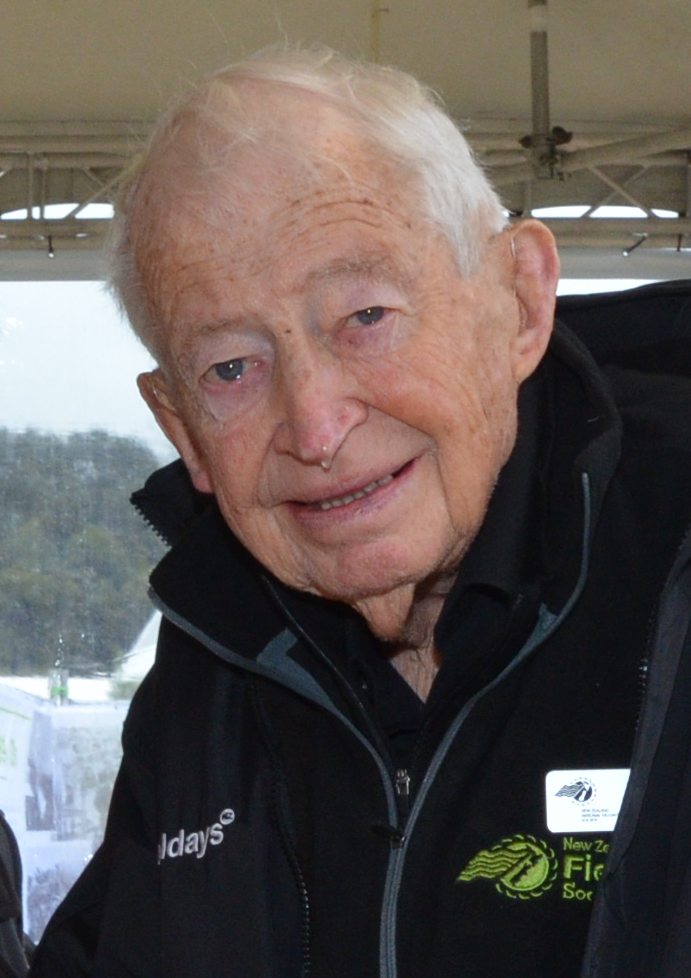
- Kneebone in 2018

President of Federated Farmers
- In office 1974–1977

Personal details
- Born: John Thomas Kneebone; 4 September 1935 Matamata, New Zealand
- Died: 28 June 2020 (aged 84) Cambridge, New Zealand
- Spouse: Kay Alexander (m. 1965)
- Children: 3
- Education: Matamata College
- Occupation: Dairy farmer

John Thomas Kneebone CMG (4 September 1935 – 28 June 2020) was a New Zealand local politician and farming leader. He was a member of the Matamata County Council from 1959 to 1967, and was president of Federated Farmers between 1974 and 1977.

== Early life and family ==
Born in Matamata on 4 September 1935, Kneebone was educated at Hinuera School and Matamata College. On 11 December 1965, he married Kay Alexander, and the couple went on to have three children.

== Career ==
Kneebone was a farmer and company director, and was active in local politics and as a farming leader. He was an elected member of the Matamata County Council between 1959 and 1967. He was elected as president of Federated Farmers in 1974, and served in that position until 1977. He was appointed to the Waitangi Tribunal in 1989, and served for 17 years. He was the inaugural chair of the Lake Taupō Protection Trust, established to administer an $80 million fund to protect the water quality of Lake Taupō.

Kneebone was the inspiration behind the National Agricultural Fieldays, established in 1969, after visiting the United Kingdom on a Nuffield Scholarship in 1966. He also served as a member of the Land Settlement Board and the Soil Conservation and Rivers Control Council.

In the 1988 New Year Honours, Kneebone was appointed a Companion of the Order of St Michael and St George, for public services and services to agriculture.

== Death ==
Kneebone died in Cambridge on 28 June 2020.
