= Ned Dobbs =

New Zealand public servant and educationalist (1915–1988)

Ned Dobbs CBE
- Born: Arthur Newman Vickery Dobbs; 5 July 1915; Gisborne, New Zealand
- Died: 15 October 1988 (aged 73); Lower Hutt, New Zealand
- Occupation: Public servant
- Known for: Integration of New Zealand private schools into the state education system

Arthur Newman Vickery Dobbs CBE (5 July 1915 – 15 October 1988) was a New Zealand public servant. He was a squadron leader in the RNZAF during the Second World War. He was Director-General of Education from 1971 to 1975, and chaired the committee responsible for integration of private schools into the state education system. He settled a libel case against the Minister of Education, the Student Teachers' Association and the Student Press Ltd after an article in the student teachers' magazine reported derogatory remarks attributed to the Minister. In 1976 he was appointed CBE.

== Early life and education ==
Dobbs was born on 5 July 1915 in Gisborne. His parents were Fanny Elizabeth and Arthur Harold Dobbs. Dobbs attended Christchurch Boys' High School and completed a Bachelor of Commerce in 1937 followed by a Masters in Commerce in 1939, both at Canterbury University College.

== Career ==
Dobbs joined the public service in 1934, where he was secretary to the New Zealand Army Board. He also held positions in the Labour Department and the State Services Commission. During the Second World War Dobbs was a squadron leader with the RNZAF, and from 1978 to 1986 he represented the New Zealand Returned Services Association on the War Pensions Board.

Dobbs was the administrative Assistant Commissioner of Police, before being appointed as Army Secretary in 1957. This position was the senior administrative post in the army, and Dobbs was required to attend a year's training at the Imperial Defence College in the UK. In 1964 he was designated Deputy Secretary of Defence (Army). Dobbs was appointed as Assistant Director-General of Education (administration) in 1965, although this was not his first appointment in education as he had been seconded to the department as an administrative assistant in 1946 during the department's reorganisation.

Dobbs was appointed Director-General of Education in 1971, succeeding Keith Sheen. Robin Williams, vice-chancellor of the University of Otago, was originally named as Sheen's successor, but Dobbs won the position on appeal. His major task was to chair the steering committee tasked with integrating private schools into the state educational system. He was replaced as Director-General in July 1975 by Bill Renwick, despite an attempt by the Educational Institute to invalidate the appointment.

In 1975 the student teachers' magazine Clamant I reported on a meeting between the Minister of Education, Phillip Amos, and student teachers in Christchurch on 11 April 1975. Amos was reported to have said that "they had a new and progressive director-general which he was glad about ... Dobbs had been extremely right-wing and an impediment to progress. He [Amos] had therefore ordered his compulsory retirement".

Dobbs took a libel case for NZ$20,000 against the Minister of Education, Phillip Amos, the Student Teachers' Association, and the Student Press Ltd which had printed the paper. When questioned about the alleged comments in Parliament, Amos denied making them and confirmed that he had in fact extended Dobbs's term as Director-General. In July of that year Amos had referred to Dobbs's "distinguished career", particularly his efforts on the integration of private schools, which he believed would "be regarded as a highlight of his career".

The case was settled in December of the same year when Amos stated that he had never made such derogatory remarks, and "Mr Amos, as the Minister at the time, wishes to confirm the unqualified tribute to Mr Dobbs's services which he has already made in the House. The derogatory statements conveyed by the article are completely unwarranted, and he is glad to take the opportunity of saying so publicly." The Student Teachers' Association and Student Press both apologised for publishing the comments and shared Dobbs's costs.

== Personal life ==
Dobbs married Gwendoline Rakura Stephens on 3 June 1943 at the Durham Street Methodist Church in Christchurch.

Dobbs died 15 October 1988 in Lower Hutt, at the age of 73, survived by his wife.

== Honours and awards ==
Dobbs was appointed Commander of the Order of the British Empire (CBE) in the Queen's Birthday Honours List of 1976.

In 1994 Dobbs's wife left a memorial scholarship, the ANV Dobbs Memorial Scholarship, to be awarded annually to a Year 13 student from Christchurch Boys' High School who is going on to university study, with preference to those studying economics. The scholarship is administered by the Public Trust.
