= Arnold Campbell (educationalist) =

University lecturer, educationalist, writer

Arnold Everitt Campbell CMG (13 August 1906 – 2 July 1980) was a New Zealand university lecturer, educationalist and writer. He was born in Karere, New Zealand, on 13 August 1906.

In the 1966 New Year Honours, Campbell was appointed a Companion of the Order of St Michael and St George, in recognition of his services as director of the Department of Education.

Campbell's entry in the Dictionary of New Zealand Biography was written by educationalist Bill Renwick.
