= Rena Bell =

New Zealand educator

Kathrine McAllister "Rena" Bell MBE (née Stewart; 13 May 1895 – 7 October 1970) was a New Zealand teacher, farmer, political organiser and educationalist. She was born in Manchester, Lancashire, England, on 13 May 1895.

In the 1966 New Year Honours, Bell was appointed a Member of the Order of the British Empire for services to education and the community, especially as chair of the Tauranga College board of governors.
