= List of vice-chancellors of the University of Auckland =

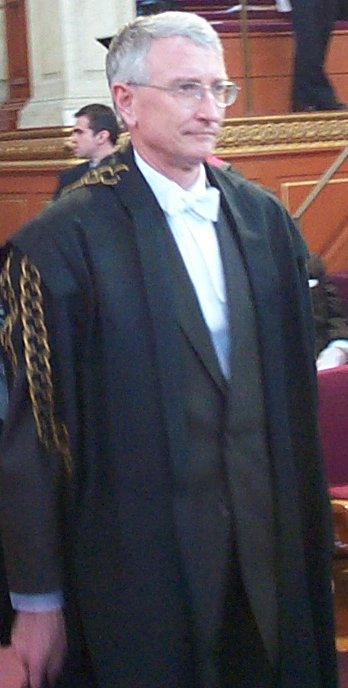
John Hood, appointed Vice-Chancellor in 1998, pictured at his subsequent appointment as Vice-Chancellor of Oxford.

The following people have been vice-chancellors of the University of Auckland in New Zealand:

- 1958–1970 – Kenneth John Maidment (first vice-chancellor, previously principal 1949–1957)
- 1971 – Sir Colin Maiden
- 1995 – Kit Carson
- 1998 – John Hood
- 2005 – Stuart McCutcheon
- 2020 – Dawn Freshwater
- 2026 – Nic Smith

== See also ==
- List of chancellors of the University of Oxford
