= List of universities in New Zealand =

The locations of the main campus of each university

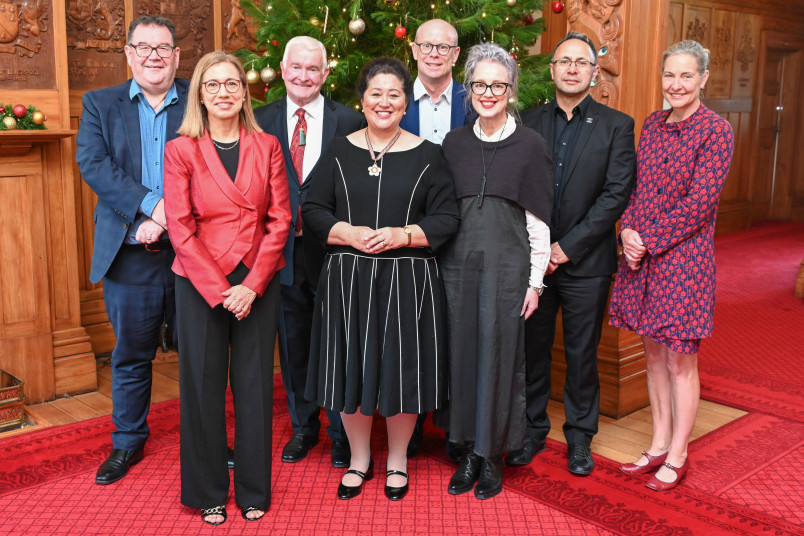
Governor-General Cindy Kiro with vice-chancellors and deputy vice-chancellors of New Zealand universities in December 2024

This is a list of the universities in New Zealand, of which there are eight. As of 2024, all universities are public. All of the universities, with the exception of AUT, are descended from the former University of New Zealand, a collegiate university that existed from 1870 to 1961. The universities provided tertiary education to over 182,900 students or 142,720 equivalent full-time students (EFTS) in 2021.

== Universities in New Zealand ==
Arms	University	Main campus	Established	University status
	Auckland University of Technology	Auckland	1895	2000
	Lincoln University	Lincoln	1878	1990
	Massey University	Palmerston North	1928	1963
	University of Auckland	Auckland	1883	1883
	University of Canterbury	Christchurch	1873	1873
	University of Otago	Dunedin	1869	1869
	University of Waikato	Hamilton	1964	1964
	Victoria University of Wellington	Wellington	1897	1897

== General information ==
Name	Main campus	Established	Student headcount (2024)	Equivalent full-time students (2024)	Staff (FTE, 2013)	Government funding ($ millions, 2013)	Funding (NZD) per student	Students per staff member
Auckland University of Technology	Auckland	2000^{i}	25,270	18,565	2,143	150	7,963	8.8
Lincoln University	Lincoln	1878	4,220	3,070	610	41	12,662	5.3
Massey University	Palmerston North	1927	26,505	16,250	2,994	185	9,849	6.4
University of Auckland	Auckland	1883	45,755	35,295	4,909	389	11,819	6.7
University of Canterbury	Christchurch	1873	20,825	16,975	1,907	152	12,739	6.3
University of Otago	Dunedin	1869	21,315	18,564	3,838	271	14,731	4.9
University of Waikato	Hamilton	1964	14,065	10,485	1,520	102	10,257	6.6
Victoria University of Wellington	Wellington	1897	20,605	15,875	1,886	159	9,501	9.1
Total				135,079	19,807	1,449	—	—
Average				16,885	2,475	181	11,190	6.7

* i. Predecessors established in 1895.

== Faculties and colleges ==
The top-level divisions (faculties, colleges) of each university can vary widely from university to university. While all universities have faculties of science, for instance, fewer have faculties of education. The table below summarises the faculties and colleges of every university in New Zealand:

Subject area	University of Otago	University of Canterbury	Lincoln University	Victoria University (Wellington)	Massey University	University of Waikato	AUT	University of Auckland
Arts	Division of Humanities	Faculty of Arts		Faculty of Humanities and Social Sciences	College of Humanities and Social Sciences	Division of Arts, Law, Psychology and Social Sciences Te Pua Wānanga ki te Ao – Faculty of Māori and Indigenous Studies	Faculty of Culture and Society Faculty of Māori and Indigenous Development	Faculty of Arts
Sciences	Division of Sciences	Faculty of Science	Faculty of Agriculture and Life Sciences Faculty of Environment, Society, and Design	Faculty of Science	College of Sciences	Division of STEM	Faculty of Health and Environmental Sciences	Faculty of Science
Business	Otago Business School (Division of Commerce)	UC Business School	Faculty of Agribusiness and Commerce	Victoria Business School	Massey Business School	Waikato Management School	Faculty of Business, Economics and Law	University of Auckland Business School
Health Sciences	Division of Health Sciences	Faculty of Health		Faculty of Health	College of Health	Division of Health	Faculty of Health and Environmental Sciences	Faculty of Medical and Health Sciences
Medicine	Otago Medical School; Faculty of Dentistry					New Zealand Graduate School of Medicine		School of Medicine
Engineering		Faculty of Engineering		Faculty of Engineering	College of Sciences	Division of STEM	Faculty of Design and Creative Technologies	Faculty of Engineering
Law	Faculty of Law	Faculty of Law		Faculty of Law		Division of Arts, Law, Psychology and Social Sciences	Faculty of Business, Economics and Law	Auckland Law School
Fine Arts, Architecture		Ilam School of Fine Arts	School of Landscape Architecture	Faculty of Architecture and Design	College of Creative Arts		Faculty of Design and Creative Technologies	Faculty of Creative Arts and Industries
Education	College of Education	Faculty of Education		Faculty of Education	Institute of Education	Division of Education	Faculty of Culture and Society	Faculty of Education and Social Work

== International rankings ==
These three ranking systems are regarded as the most influential and widely observed international university rankings.

According to QS World University Rankings:

Institution	2008/09	2009/10	2010/11	2011/12	2012/13	2014	2015	2016	2017	2018	2019	2020	2021	2022	2023	2024
University of Auckland	65	61	68	82	83	94	92	82	81	82	85	83	81	85	87	68
University of Otago	124	125	135	130	133	155	159	173	169	151	175	176	184	194	217	206
Massey University	283	299	302	329	308	343	346	337	340	316	332	287	272	284	292	239
Victoria University of Wellington	227	229	225	237	237	265	275	229	228	219	221	215	223	236	275	241
University of Waikato	378	314	316	357	374	401–410	401–410	338	324	292	274	266	375	373	331	250
University of Canterbury	186	188	189	212	221	238	242	211	214	214	231	227	270	258	284	256
Lincoln University	—	—	—	—	—	481–490	411–420	373	343	319	317	356	387	372	368	362
Auckland University of Technology	—	—	—	—	451–500	471–480	501–550	481-490	441-450	441-450	464	442	437	451	486	407

According to THE World University Rankings:

Institution	2011	2012	2013	2014	2015	2016	2017	2018	2019	2020	2021	2022	2023
University of Auckland	145	173	161	164	175	172	165	192	201-250	179	147	137	139
University of Otago	—	201–225	226–250	226–250	251-275	201-250	201-250	201-250	201-250	201-250	201-250	201-250	301-350
Victoria University of Wellington	—	251–275	251–275	276–300	276-300	351-400	351-400	401-500	401-500	501-600	501-600	501-600	401-500
University of Canterbury	—	301–350	301–350	301–350	301-350	401-500	351-400	351-400	301-350	301-350	401-500	501-600	601-800
University of Waikato	—	301–350	301–350	301–350	351-400	401-500	401-500	351-400	401-500	501-600	501-600	401-500	401-500
Massey University	—	350–400	351–400	—	—	501-600	401-500	401-500	501-600	501-600	601-800	601-800	601-800
Auckland University of Technology	—	—	—	—	—	601-800	501-600	401-500	301-350	251-300	251-300	201-250	251-300
Lincoln University	—	—	—	—	—	—	401-500	501-600	501-600	501-600	601-800	501-600	401-500

According to Academic Ranking of World Universities:

Institution	2003	2004	2005	2006	2007	2008	2009	2010	2011	2012	2013	2014	2015	2016	2017	2018	2019	2020	2021	2022
University of Auckland	201–250	202–301	203–300	201–300	203–304	201–302	201–302	201–300	201–300	151–200	201–300	201–300	201-300	151-200	201-300	201-300	201-300	201-300	201-300	201-300
University of Otago	351–400	202–301	301–400	201–300	305–402	201–302	201–302	201–300	201–300	201–300	201–300	201–300	201-300	301-400	301-400	301-400	301-400	301-400	301-400	301-400
Victoria University of Wellington	—	—	401–500	401–500	403–510	402–503	402–501	401–500	401–500	401–500	401–500	401–500	—	301-400	301-400	301-400	301-400	401-500	401-500	401-500
University of Canterbury	—	—	401–500	401–500	403–510	402–503	402–501	401–500	401–500	401–500	401–500	401–500	—	301-400	401-500	401-500	401-500	401-500	401-500	401-500
Massey University	351–400	404–502	401–500	401–500	305–402	303–401	402–501	401–500	401–500	401–500	401–500	—	—	—	501-600	501-600	601-700	601-700	701-800	601-700
Lincoln University	—	—	—	—	—	—	—	—	—	—	—	—	—	—	601-700	701-800	801-900	801-900	701-800	701-800
The University of Waikato	—	—	—	—	—	—	—	—	—	—	—	—	—	—	601-700	701-800	701-800	701-800	701-800	701-800
Auckland University of Technology	—	—	—	—	—	—	—	—	—	—	—	—	—	—	—	901-1000	701-800	901-1000	701-800	701-800

== Endowment ==
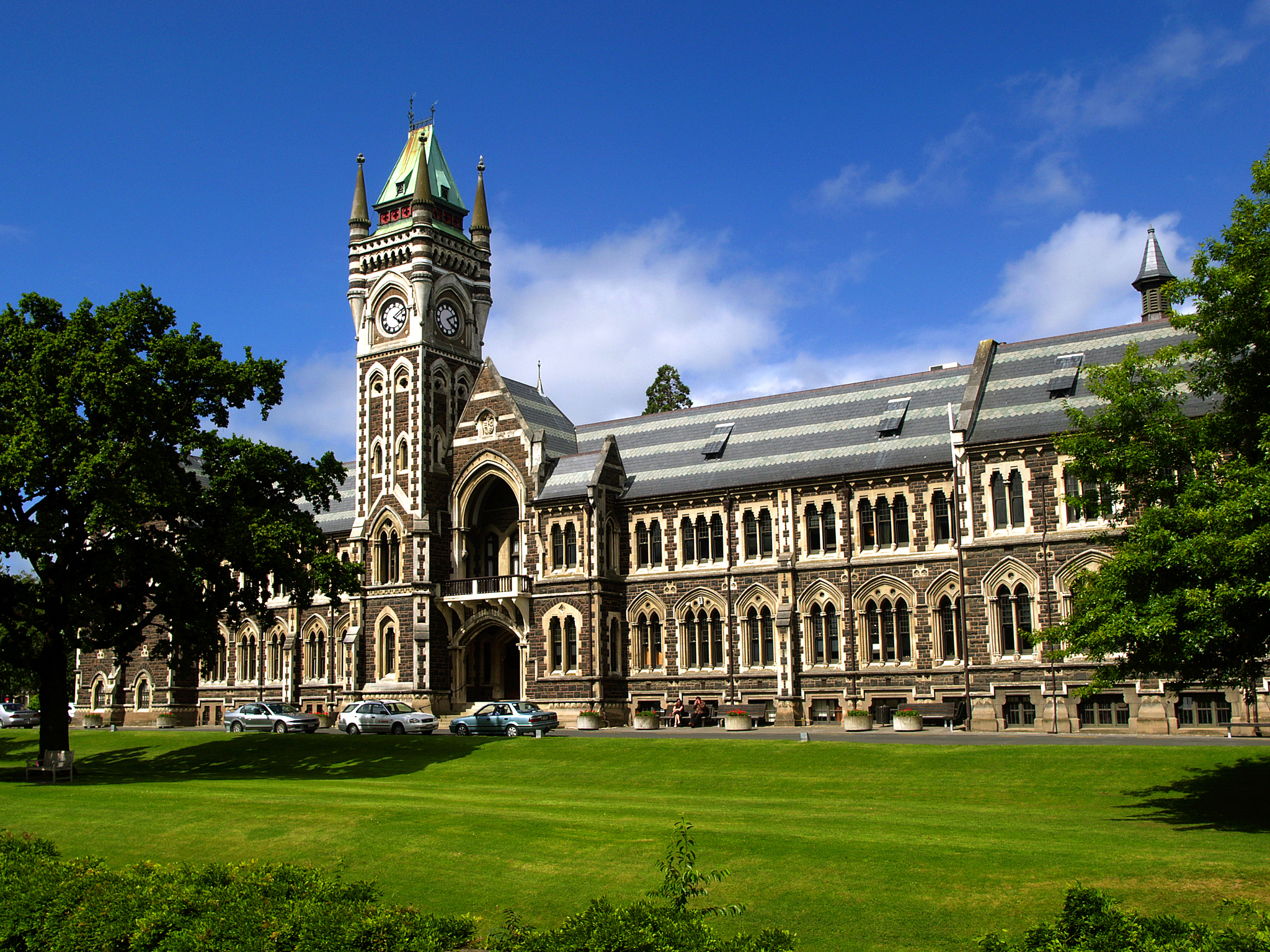
University of Otago Registry Building

New Zealand universities by endowment (millions NZD)
Institution	2019	2020	2021	2022	2023	2024
Auckland University of Technology	$2.0	$2.1	$2.4	$2.4		
Lincoln University		$0.47	$0.71	$0.97	$1.3	
Massey University	$48	$55	$56	$56	$62	$76
University of Auckland	$257	$289	$321	$304	$352	$396
University of Canterbury		$137	$142			
University of Otago	$242	$258	$280	$261	$274	$297
University of Waikato	$5.3	$8.8	$14	$13		
Victoria University of Wellington	$70	$74	$84	$75	$97	$106

== See also ==
- Tertiary education in New Zealand
- Polytechnics and institutes of technology in New Zealand
- List of New Zealand university leaders
- Torrens University Australia, an Australian private university which has a campus in New Zealand
- Wānanga, tertiary institution that provides education in a Māori cultural context
