= Bill Renwick =

New Zealand public servant and educationalist (1929–2013)

Bill Renwick CBE
- Born: William Leslie Renwick; 8 January 1929; Auckland, New Zealand
- Died: 29 June 2013 (aged 84); Wellington, New Zealand
- Occupation: Educationalist
- Known for: The development of the education system in New Zealand

William Leslie Renwick CBE (8 January 1929 – 29 June 2013) was a New Zealand educationalist. He was educated in Northland and Auckland before training as a teacher at Auckland Teachers' Training College. After working as a teacher and gaining a BA from Victoria University of Wellington, he was appointed as a researcher to the Commission on Education. After a number of school inspector positions within the Department of Education, he was appointed Director-General of Education in 1975. Retiring from the department in 1988, he took up a research position at the Stout Research Centre in Wellington. He performed background research on Treaty of Waitangi claims, and wrote an extensive review for the University of Waikato on their handling of complaints against a doctoral student. He had a variety of committee and board roles in New Zealand and overseas, including as a council member of the University of the South Pacific, a member of the OECD Education Committee, chair of the New Zealand National Commission for UNESCO, a member of the governance board for the Commonwealth of Learning, and as a member of the QEII Arts Council and the advisory committee of the historical branch of the Department of Internal Affairs.

Renwick helped found Toi Whakaari, the National Drama School, and the National Dance School, as well the New Zealand Youth Choir. He published many papers, and a biography on Colin Scrimgeour, whose radio programme had sparked his love of singing.

He received a Distinguished Visitor Award from Monbu-shō, the Ministry of Education, Science, Sports and Culture in Japan, a Fulbright Senior Research Fellowship, and the Mackie Medal from the Australia and New Zealand Association for the Advancement of Science. He gave the 1987 John Beaglehole Memorial Lecture and the inaugural Peter Freyberg Memorial Lecture. In the 1988 New Year Honours, he was appointed Commander of the Order of the British Empire (CBE). Deakin University recognised Renwick's contributions to Australian education with an honorary LittD degree.

== Early life and education ==
Renwick was born in 1929 in Auckland. His parents were William Arthur Renwick and Agnes Edith Martha Renwick (née Andin). His father was unemployed, but later worked on a road gang. Renwick attended Matakohe, Newton Central, and Te Papapa primary schools. His secondary education was at Seddon Memorial College. His brothers were a welder and a truck driver, and Renwick's desire at age 14 was to become a carpenter, until his teachers encouraged him to stay on at school. He then attended Auckland Teachers' Training College, Auckland University, and Victoria University of Wellington. He graduated with a Bachelor of Arts from Victoria in 1952. He studied at the London University Institute of Education and graduated with a Master of Arts in 1961. Returning to Victoria, his 1962 master's thesis was titled Self-government and protection: a study of Stephen's two cardinal points of policy in their bearing upon constitutional development in New Zealand in the years 1837–1867.

== Career ==
Renwick's professional career started in 1949 as a teacher at Fairburn School in Ōtāhuhu. From 1950 to 1954, he taught at Muritai School in Eastbourne. From 1954 to 1960, he was a lecturer at the Wellington Teachers' College. Under the chairmanship of George Currie, he was research officer for the Commission on Education from 1960 to 1962, appointed by Keith Sheen, who had already picked him as a potential future Director-General. From 1962, he held positions with the Department of Education: inspector of primary schools, senior inspector of teacher training, district-senior inspector of Southland schools, and senior inspector with special duties in Wellington. Renwick was younger than many of his colleagues, and had a reputation as a "bright young man" and a "mouthpiece of the new left". He said of this time "I took the advice of Keith Sheen ... that what you do is keep your head down and do what you are doing to the best of your ability, and that is as much as you concern yourself with. I was also conscious that at that particular time, the mid 1960s, I could name three people of whom it had been earlier said they would become a Director-General and they didn't so I viewed all that with a certain scepticism."

In May 1971 Renwick succeeded Joseph Langmuir Hunter (1908–1985) as Assistant Director-General of Education, under new Director Robin Williams. It was around this time that Renwick met C. E. Beeby. Renwick had responsibility for organising a government-backed seminar on educational planning, which was held in Wellington in May 1972. Beeby and Renwick met monthly for lunch and Beeby commented on and reviewed many of Renwick's publications. Renwick influenced Beeby's thinking on educational policy in developing countries, discussed extensively revisions to Beeby's last book, The Biography of an Idea: Beeby on Education, and provided an "elegant and thoughtful" assessment of Beeby for the latter's 90th birthday festschrift.

Renwick was promoted to Director-General of Education in 1975, replacing Ned Dobbs. His "backwoods ... Depression-era" childhood led to him being described as a "man of the people" who had attained his achievements through hard work and the opportunities afforded him by New Zealand's education system.

Within days of his appointment Renwick had scrapped a proposal for internal assessment of the Secondary Certificate, which the School Certificate Examination Board had spent two years preparing but which two out of three teachers opposed. The following year Renwick led the New Zealand delegation to the Commonwealth Secretariat in London, where it was reported that Third World countries were finding imported educational systems problematic and might need a move towards more vocational training.

During the 1970s and 80s there was criticism of the Department of Education as overly bureaucratic and too conservative. Education standards were considered by many to be unsatisfactory, there was high youth unemployment, and the increasing popularity of neoliberal ideas favoured a restructuring of the education system. The Picot task force, which reported in May 1988, prepared the way for a complete change to the administration system for New Zealand schools, later known as Tomorrow's schools, which broke the Department of Education into several agencies, devolved decision-making to school Boards of Trustees, and abolished regional boards.

Lyall Perris, former acting secretary for education, later wrote "The Report of the Taskforce (Picot 1988) was released in May 1988, a few months after the Lange government had been returned with a sizable majority. There was to be no slackening of the pace of change. The Director-General of Education, Bill Renwick, could have been an obstacle but instead announced his retirement, and a new head for the Department of Education was to be appointed."

After his retirement, Renwick took up a position as senior research fellow at the Stout Research Centre of Victoria University, where he undertook background research for Treaty of Waitangi claims.

From 1971 to 1988, Renwick was a council member of the University of the South Pacific. From 1972 to 1988, he was a member of the OECD Education Committee. For the same period, he belonged to the OECD's governing board of the Centre for Education Research and Innovation in Paris and in 1977 and 1988, he was the board's chairman. From 1971 to 1989, he was a member of the New Zealand National Commission for UNESCO and from 1983 until his retirement, he chaired the commission. From 1980 to 1988, he was on UNESCO's Regional Advisory Committee for Asia–Pacific. From 1988, he was on the governance board for the Commonwealth of Learning. From 1975 to 1988, he was a member of the QEII Arts Council. In 1988, he joined the advisory committee of the historical branch of the Department of Internal Affairs. From 1989, he chaired the New Zealand School of Dance.

== University of Waikato 'Kupka report' ==
In April 2000, the University of Waikato found itself in the national news when complaints, which had been ongoing since 1995, that a doctoral student researching the German language in New Zealand was a neo-Nazi suddenly became public. In December 2000, Vice-Chancellor Bryan Gould called on Renwick to provide "a full review of the University's handling of the case", a process that was initially intended to take three weeks. Renwick finally provided his 161-page report in September 2002, and made a number of recommendations, including that a formal apology be made to the Jewish community. Gould said that the university accepted the report in its entirety and would act on the recommendations.

== Personal life ==
Renwick's first marriage, to Merle Norris, was dissolved. They had no children. In 1960, he married Margery Elizabeth Rose, daughter of Rachel and Erle Rose. They had two daughters and one son.

Renwick had a love of singing, begun when listening to "Uncle Scrim" as a child. When a civil servant, he was known to request that his overseas trips be arranged to suit the Phoenix Choir rehearsal schedule. Renwick was a co-founder of the New Zealand Youth Choir. He was the choir's chairman of trustees from 1979 to 1988. He also helped found Toi Whakaari the National Drama School and the New Zealand School of Dance.

Renwick died in Wellington on 29 June 2013, at the age of 84. Russell Marshall, who was Minister of Education from 1984 to 1987 and spoke at Renwick's funeral, wrote that "Bill Renwick died believing that his life's contribution had been worth little. His view was understandable but mistaken."

== Honours and awards ==
In 1977, Renwick was awarded the Queen Elizabeth II Silver Jubilee Medal. In 1978, he received a Distinguished Visitor Award from Monbu-shō, the Ministry of Education, Science, Sports and Culture in Japan. In 1986, he was awarded a Fulbright Senior Research Fellowship. He was invited to give the John Beaglehole Memorial Lecture in 1987. In the 1988 New Year Honours, he was appointed Commander of the Order of the British Empire (CBE). Also in 1988, Deakin University recognised Renwick's contributions to Australian education with an honorary Doctor of Letters degree and he received the Mackie Medal from the Australia and New Zealand Association for the Advancement of Science. In 1991, Renwick gave the inaugural Peter Freyberg Memorial Lecture.

== Selected publications ==
In 2011 Renwick published a biography of Colin Scrimgeour, Scrim: The Man With a Mike, billed as "a cautionary tale of one of New Zealand's most popular radio broadcasters". He published many reports, several books and a selection of speeches, a selection of which are listed here:

- William Leslie Renwick (1979), This side of paradigm: Patterns in verbal interaction: a study of children's language behaviour, Hamilton: Wilf Malcolm Institute of Educational Research, Wikidata Q113587890
- W. L. Renwick; Whiteford, Peter (1987), Emblems of identity : painting, carving and Maori-Pakeha understanding, Wellington: Department of Education, Wikidata Q113587894 (an educational resource)
- W. L. Renwick (1986). Moving targets: six essays on educational policy. Wellington: New Zealand Council for Educational Research. ISBN 978-0-908567-46-1. OCLC 15129383. OL 50404713M. Wikidata Q113587927. Contains a foreword by Beeby.
- W. L. Renwick (1990). The Treaty now. Wellington: GP Books. ISBN 978-0-477-01460-1. LCCN 91218522. OCLC 28221866. OL 1657063M. Wikidata Q113587902.
- W. L. Renwick (2004). Creating a national spirit: celebrating New Zealand's centennial. Wellington: Te Herenga Waka University Press. ISBN 978-0-86473-475-4. OL 22630599M. Wikidata Q113587889.
