= Pae Ruha =

New Zealand Māori leader

Te Paekiomeka Joy Ruha ONZM QSM (21 February 1931 – 16 December 2011) was a prominent Māori leader and member of Māori Women's Welfare League. Of Te Whānau-ā-Apanui and Ngāti Porou descent, she lived most of her life in Wellington.

As a trained teacher, she taught Māori language for many years at The Correspondence School, enabling students whose schools did not offer the language to take in by distance education.

Since 1986, she had been kaumātua of Te Herenga Waka Marae at Victoria University of Wellington. She was a lifetime member of the Māori Women’s Welfare League and a foundation member of Te Atamira Taiwhenua, the national Maori advisory group to the Department of Internal Affairs. For some years she was a judge at the national kapa haka competitions.

In the 1988 New Year Honours, Ruha was awarded the Queen's Service Medal for community service. In the 2006 Queen's Birthday Honours, she was appointed an Officer of the New Zealand Order of Merit, for services to Māori. She was made a Hunter Fellow of Victoria University of Wellington in 2011.
