= John Oakley (cricketer) =

New Zealand cricketer

John Oakley CBE
Personal information
- Full name: John Hayward Oakley
- Born: 7 February 1925; Palmerston North, New Zealand
- Died: 9 August 2013 (aged 88); Wellington, New Zealand
- Batting: Right-handed
- Relatives: David Oakley (son)

Domestic team information
- Years: Team
- 1946-47: Wellington

Career statistics
Competition	First-class
Matches	2
Runs scored	74
Batting average	18.50
100s/50s	0/0
Top score	43
Balls bowled	–
Wickets	–
Bowling average	–
5 wickets in innings	–
10 wickets in match	–
Best bowling	–
Catches/stumpings	2/–
- Source: Cricinfo, 18 August 2018

John Hayward Oakley CBE (7 February 1925 – 9 August 2013) was a New Zealand cricketer and cricket administrator. He played two first-class matches for Wellington in 1946-47 and was President of New Zealand Cricket from 1985 to 1987.

== Life and career ==
John Oakley was born in Palmerston North and educated at Sacred Heart College in Auckland, and Victoria University in Wellington, where he studied law. He played for the University team in the senior Wellington cricket competition as a hard-hitting right-handed batsman, and represented Wellington in two first-class matches in 1946-47. His top score was 43 in the second innings of his debut match against Auckland, batting at number four.

He was co-creator in 1972 and executive member of the New Zealand Cricket Foundation, a trustee of the Wellington Cricket Trust for 30 years from 1974, President of the Wellington Cricket Association from 1982 to 1985, and President of New Zealand Cricket from 1985 to 1987. In 1986 he instigated the establishment of the New Zealand Cricket Museum in the old grandstand of the Basin Reserve. Part of the museum is now called the John Oakley Gallery. In the 1988 New Year Honours, he was appointed a Commander of the Order of the British Empire, for services to cricket.

Oakley spent his working life as a lawyer in Wellington. He was a partner in the firm Hogg Gillespie Carter & Oakley. He married Margaret Carmine in 1954, and they had a son and two daughters. Their son David played for Wellington in the 1980s.
