= David Oakley (cricketer) =

New Zealand cricketer (born 1960)

Personal information
- Full name: David Frederick Oakley
- Born: 21 November 1960 (age 65); Wellington, New Zealand
- Batting: Right-handed
- Relatives: John Oakley (father)

Domestic team information
- Years: Team
- 1980-81 to 1984-85: Wellington

Career statistics
Competition	FC	List A
Matches	5	7
Runs scored	90	18
Batting average	11.25	3.00
100s/50s	0/0	0/0
Top score	38*	6*
Balls bowled	–	–
Wickets	–	–
Bowling average	–	–
5 wickets in innings	–	–
10 wickets in match	–	n/a
Best bowling	–	–
Catches/stumpings	3/–	1/–
- Source: Cricinfo, 18 August 2018

David Frederick Oakley (born 21 November 1960) is a former New Zealand cricketer. He played a few matches of first-class and List A cricket for Wellington between 1980 and 1985.

His father John played for Wellington in the 1940s.
