= Tasman Joseph McKee =

New Zealand chemist (1911–1973)

Tasman Joseph McKee OBE (7 May 1911 – 7 February 1973) was a New Zealand industrial and agricultural chemist, geologist, company director. He was born in Nelson, New Zealand, on 7 May 1911 and was educated at Tasman and Mapua Schools, Wellington's St Patrick's College, Motueka District High School and Nelson College.

In the 1966 New Year Honours, McKee was appointed an Officer of the Order of the British Empire for services to industry, particularly to mineral development.
