= Joye Evans =

New Zealand Girl Guide leader

Joye Evans OBE
- Born: Beatrice Mary Joye Williamson; 26 March 1929; Palmerston North, New Zealand
- Died: 28 August 2021 (aged 92); Palmerston North, New Zealand
- Known for: Girl Guide leader
- Spouse: Morgan David Evans (m. 1964; died 2012)

Beatrice Mary Joye Evans OBE (née Williamson; 26 March 1929 – 28 August 2021) was a New Zealand guiding leader who served as chief commissioner of New Zealand Girl Guides.

== Biography ==
Evans was born Beatrice Mary Joye Williamson in Palmerston North on 26 March 1929, the daughter of Laura and John Williamson. She trained as a radiographer in the United Kingdom, and worked in the United States, where she was a member of the Johns Hopkins University surgical team that developed the coronary angiogram in 1960. After returning to New Zealand, she met her future husband, town planner Morgan David Evans, and they married in 1964. The couple did not have children.

Joye Evans became active in guiding in New Zealand during the 1970s when she began assisting with administration in the Manawatū region. She rose through the movement, becoming Manawatū provincial commissioner, and was elected chief commissioner of the New Zealand Girl Guides Association in 1983. In the 1988 New Year Honours, she was appointed an Officer of the Order of the British Empire, for services to the Girl Guide movement.

In 1988, Evans fell from a ladder and required two artificial hips. However, she and her husband continued their community work, including being intimately involved in the first Cancer Society Daffodil Day in New Zealand in 1990.

Evans died in Palmerston North on 28 August 2021, aged 92, having been predeceased by her husband in 2012. A memorial service was held for Evans at St Peter's Anglican Church in Palmerston North on 14 January 2022, and her ashes were buried later that day in Feilding Cemetery.
