= Stuart McCutcheon =

New Zealand university administrator (died 2023)

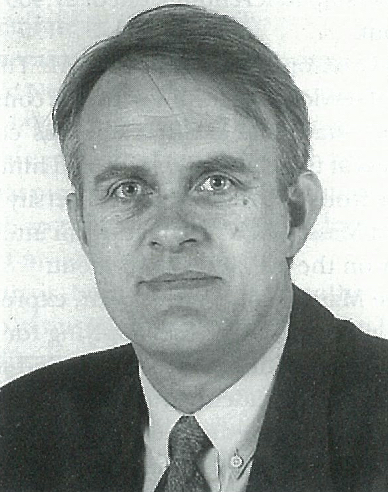
- McCutcheon in 1999

Vice-Chancellor of the University of Auckland
- In office January 2005 – March 2020
- Chancellor: Roger France
- Preceded by: John Hood
- Succeeded by: Dawn Freshwater

Vice-Chancellor of Victoria University of Wellington
- In office November 2000 – December 2004

Deputy Vice-Chancellor of Massey University
- In office January 1999 – ?

Assistant Vice-Chancellor (Research) of Massey University
- In office January 1994 – December 1998

Personal details
- Born: Stuart Norman McCutcheon; 10 November 1954 Wellington, New Zealand
- Died: 6 January 2023 (aged 68) Auckland, New Zealand
- Scientific career
- Education: Massey University
- Fields: Animal science
- Workplaces: Massey University
- Thesis: A study of some factors affecting the resistance of newborn lambs to cold-stress with particular reference to starvation and exposure mortality (1981)
- Doctoral advisors: Maurice McDonald; Colin Holmes; Al Rae

Stuart Norman McCutcheon (10 November 1954 – 6 January 2023) was a New Zealand university administrator. Until March 2020 he was vice-chancellor of the University of Auckland, New Zealand, at which point he was the longest-serving current vice-chancellor in New Zealand, having served three five-year terms. He was previously vice-chancellor at Victoria University of Wellington, and deputy vice-chancellor and assistant vice-chancellor (research) at Massey University.

In 2012, he was the highest-paid public sector worker in New Zealand.

McCutcheon was the chairman of the Riddet Institute, a Centre of Research Excellence in food science based in Palmerston North, and Secretary of the Woolf Fisher Trust.

== Early life, education and early career ==
McCutcheon was born in Wellington on 10 November 1954, and was educated at Rongotai College. He went on to study at Massey University, where he graduated with a Bachelor of Agricultural Science with first-class honours in animal science, and then a PhD in metabolic physiology. He was appointed a lecturer in animal science at Massey in 1984, and became head of department in 1990. He served as Massey's assistant vice-chancellor from 1994 to 1999, when he was promoted to deputy vice-chancellor.

== Administrative career ==
McCutcheon oversaw a 15-year period of development at the University of Auckland. Staff numbers (FTE) rose from 4,332 in 2005 to 5,968 in 2019, his last full year as vice-chancellor. Over the same period, student numbers increased from 30,800 (EFTS) to 34,521. The University's physical facilities were modernised and rationalised with major new buildings for the faculties of business, science, engineering and medicine, the sale of the Tamaki Campus and the purchase of land for the Newmarket Campus. The University's operating revenue almost doubled during his tenure, reaching $1.2 billion per annum by 2019, and net assets more than tripled to $3.5 billion. In addition, Professor McCutcheon led the University of Auckland Campaign, New Zealand's most ambitious and successful philanthropic campaign, raising $380 million. Despite significant efforts to support students within the University, proportions of both Māori and Pacific students remained similar during McCutcheon's term. McCutcheon is quoted as saying his most significant regret during his Vice-Chancellorship is that “I’ve never persuaded any government, any minister, to be genuinely interested in the future of the universities…”.

The closure of three specialist libraries for financial reasons at the University of Auckland in 2018 created significant controversy. In September 2019, McCutcheon was criticised for not removing posters by a white supremacist group after several University of Auckland students complained that individuals wearing swastikas were intimidating students, while fascist posters, stickers and white supremacist messages were reportedly appearing on campus. Formerly, McCutcheon had labelled the claims of wider white supremacist rhetoric at the university 'nonsense'. McCutcheon later released a statement to staff in which he clarified his position on free speech, noting he always has been, and always will be utterly opposed to prejudice, discrimination and hate speech of any kind, including the kind that is characterised as white supremacy, and acknowledging the very real hurt and sense of threat that some people at the University felt in response to these expressions of white supremacist views.

== Personal life ==
McCutcheon was married to Deborah and had two children.

== Death ==
McCutcheon died suddenly from a heart attack in Auckland on 6 January 2023, aged 68.
