= Leslie Kay (engineer) =

British–New Zealand electrical engineer (1922–2020)

Leslie Kay OBE
- Born: 14 January 1922; Chester-le-Street, County Durham, England
- Died: 2 June 2020 (aged 98); Southland, New Zealand
- Education: Durham University; University of Birmingham
- Known for: Sonar devices
- Spouse: Nora Waters (m. 1944; died 2004)
- Children: 3
- Scientific career
- Fields: Electrical engineering
- Workplaces: Admiralty Underwater Weapons Establishment; University of Birmingham; University of Canterbury
- Thesis: Echo-location by man and animals: collection of published papers (1962)

Leslie Kay OBE (14 January 1922 – 2 June 2020) was a British–New Zealand electrical engineer, particularly known for the development of ultrasonic devices to assist the blind.

== Early life and family ==
Kay was born in Chester-le-Street, County Durham, England, on 14 January 1922, the son of a colliery manager. He left school at the age of 14, and accepted an electrical apprenticeship at the local colliery managed by his father, and took night classes in electrical engineering.

In 1940, Kay joined the Royal Air Force, training as a pilot, but was later posted as an aircraft engineer because of his engineering background. His role included modifying aircraft, recalibrating their instruments, and test-flying the planes to ensure their airworthiness.

In 1944, Kay married Nora Waters, and the couple went on to have three children.

== Career ==
=== England ===
After World War II, Kay studied for a Bachelor of Engineering degree at the Newcastle campus of Durham University, graduating in 1948. Later he joined the Admiralty as a civilian scientist based at the Isle of Portland. He was involved in the development of transmitting underwater sonar for the identification of submarines, mines and torpedoes, undertaking research both on land and at sea. He also took part in naval operations, and was in a submarine off Port Said during the Suez Crisis.

After discovering that details of the technology that he helped to develop had been passed to the Soviet Union, Kay chose to move to an academic post at the University of Birmingham, where he established the Department of Electrical Engineering. At Birmingham, Kay initially continued researching underwater ultrasonic technology, but was inspired to investigate air sonar to assist blind people to navigate after watching blind children learning to swim. This led to his study of the way that bats navigate, and the development of devices for blind people.

Kay was awarded a PhD by Birmingham on the basis of eight papers on echolocation by humans and animals that he either authored or co-authored.

=== New Zealand ===
In 1965, Kay and his family migrated to New Zealand, where he took up a post at the University of Canterbury in Christchurch. He was appointed to a personal chair in 1982. Kay served as a member of the University Grants Committee, head of the Department of Electrical and Electronic Engineering, and dean of the School of Engineering at Canterbury.

At Canterbury, Kay continued his work improving devices for the blind, as well as applying ultrasonic technology to applications in medicine, robotics, diving and fishing. He developed an international reputation for his work, particularly for the sonic torch, allowing blind people to avoid obstacles, sonic spectacles, and the Trisensor Aid, allowing blind children to be trained in spatial awareness.

Kay became a naturalised New Zealander in 1979. When he retired from the University of Canterbury in 1986, Kay was conferred the title of professor emeritus. He continued his research independently, establishing Bay Advanced Technologies, a research business in Russell, to further refine devices for the blind. In 1999, he received the Saatchi and Saatchi Prize for innovation, recognising his lifetime's contribution to the field.

== Honours and awards ==
In 1971, Kay was elected a Fellow of the Royal Society of New Zealand, the first engineer to be so honoured. He was also awarded fellowships of the New Zealand Institution of Engineers (now Engineering New Zealand), the Institution of Electrical Engineers and the Institution of Electronic and Radio Engineers (both now part of the Institution of Engineering and Technology).

In the 1988 New Year Honours, Kay was appointed an Officer of the Order of the British Empire, for services to electrical and electronic engineering.

== Later life and death ==
Kay's wife, Nora, died in 2004, and he retired from active research in 2006. In retirement, Kay lived with his daughter in Southland, where he died on 2 June 2020.
