= Colin Maiden =

New Zealand academic and businessman (1933–2024)

Sir Colin Maiden

Vice-Chancellor of the University of Auckland
- In office 1971–1994
- Preceded by: Kenneth John Maidment
- Succeeded by: Kit Carson

Personal details
- Born: Colin James Maiden; 5 May 1933 Auckland, New Zealand
- Died: 31 July 2024 (aged 91)
- Spouse: Jenefor Mary Rowe (m. 1957; died 2022)
- Scientific career
- Education: Auckland University College; Exeter College, Oxford
- Fields: Hypervelocity flight
- Workplaces: Canadian Armament Research and Development Establishment; Auckland University College; General Motors Research Laboratories
- Thesis: The effect of temperature on the static and dynamic strength properties of materials (1957)

Sir Colin James Maiden (5 May 1933 – 31 July 2024) was a New Zealand mechanical engineer, university administrator and company director.

== Biography ==
Maiden was born in Auckland on 5 May 1933, the son of Henry Arnold Maiden and Lorna Maiden (née Richardson). He was educated at Auckland Grammar School where he played in the school's 1st XV rugby union team. He then attended Auckland University College completing a Bachelor and Master of Engineering, graduating with the latter degree in 1956. In 1955 he was awarded a Rhodes Scholarship to attend Exeter College, Oxford, where he completed his doctorate in 1957. While at Oxford, Maiden was awarded a tennis Blue.

In 1957, Maiden married Jenefor Mary Rowe, and the couple went on to have four children.

Maiden then took up a research post at the Canadian Armament Research and Development Establishment in Quebec, where he investigated the flight of high-velocity projectiles into space. In 1960 he returned to the School of Engineering at Auckland, and a senior lectureship in mechanical engineering. However, after a year he moved to the General Motors (GM) defence division in Santa Barbara, California, to research hypervelocity flight, and in 1966 he was appointed head of GM's metal-forming and die department in Detroit.

He then served as vice chancellor of the University of Auckland from 1971 to 1994. At his appointment he was the youngest vice chancellor in the Commonwealth, and by the time he left the post he was the longest serving Commonwealth vice chancellor. During this period he served on a number of New Zealand government committees, including the Energy Research and Development Committee and the Liquid Fuels Trust Board.

Following his retirement as vice chancellor, Maiden held directorships of many leading New Zealand companies including Fisher & Paykel Healthcare, DB Breweries, Mason Industries, Farmers Trading Company, Progressive Enterprises, ANZ Banking Group, Foodland Associated, New Zealand Steel, Winstone, Wilkins & Davies, National Insurance, Tower Corporation, and Independent Newspapers.

The Royal Society of New Zealand awarded the Thomson Medal to Maiden in 1986. In the 1992 New Year Honours, Maiden was appointed a Knight Bachelor, for services to education and business management, and in 1994 he was awarded an honorary LLD by the University of Auckland. He was an Honorary Fellow of his University of Oxford alma mater, Exeter College, where he studied as a Rhodes Scholar.

Maiden's wife, Jenefor, Lady Maiden, died in October 2022. Maiden died on 31 July 2024, at the age of 91.

== Honorific eponym ==
Colin Maiden Park in the Auckland suburb of Saint Johns is named in his honour.

== Bibliography ==
- Maiden, Colin (2008). An Energetic Life: An Autobiography. Wellington: Dunmore. ISBN 978-1877399343.

== See also ==
- List of vice-chancellors of the University of Auckland

Academic offices
Preceded by Kenneth John Maidment	Vice-Chancellor of the University of Auckland; 1971–1994	Succeeded by Kit Carson
