= Dawn Freshwater =

British mental health researcher and academic

Dawn Freshwater FRCN

6th Vice-Chancellor of the University of Auckland
- In office March 2020 – 10 April 2026
- Chancellor: Cecilia Tarrant
- Preceded by: Stuart McCutcheon
- Succeeded by: Nic Smith

18th Vice-Chancellor and President of the University of Western Australia
- In office 16 January 2017 – 2020
- Chancellor: Michael Chaney; Robert French
- Preceded by: Paul Johnson
- Succeeded by: Amit Chakma

Personal details
- Born: August 1962 (age 64) Nottingham, Nottinghamshire, England, United Kingdom
- Website: www.auckland.ac.nz/en/about-us/about-the-university/the-university/message-from-the-vice-chancellor.html
- Scientific career
- Education: University of Nottingham (BA, PhD)
- Fields: Mental health Nurse education
- Workplaces: University of Auckland; University of Leeds; University of Western Australia
- Thesis: Transformatory Learning in Nurse Education (1998)
- Doctoral advisor: Professor Eric Hall and Professor Carol Hall University of Nottingham

Dawn Freshwater FRCN (born August 1962) is a British academic, university professor, mental health researcher, and the former vice-chancellor of the University of Auckland.

== Early life and education ==
Freshwater was born in a mining family in Nottingham in August 1962, with two younger brothers. She left school at the age of 15 because her parents became unwell. Freshwater trained as a nurse and was the first member of her family to attend university. Her doctoral research investigated the impact of transformative learning on nursing students for which she was awarded a PhD by the University of Nottingham in 1998.

== Research and career ==
In 2006 Freshwater joined the University of Leeds. Her research concentrated on forensic psychology, and studied the impact of marginalised groups with severe mental health issues.

Freshwater was appointed the pro-vice-chancellor (PVC) at the University of Leeds in 2011. She led the School of Medicine application for an Athena SWAN award and served as a member of the assessment panel for the Research Excellence Framework (REF). During this time, she served on the Council of Deans for Nursing and Midwifery and was a trustee of the Florence Nightingale Foundation.

In 2014 Freshwater moved to Australia. She joined the University of Western Australia as senior deputy vice chancellor in 2016. In 2017 she was made the vice chancellor, and led the first Inclusion and Division strategy. She was the first woman to be made chair of the Group of Eight in 2018. She also led the Matariki network of universities. At the University of Western Australia, Freshwater established the Public Policy Institute, which translates research into real-world solutions for the Indo-Pacific region.

In 2019 Freshwater became the first woman to be appointed vice chancellor of the University of Auckland, whilst remaining a professor of mental health at the University of Leeds. During her appointment at the University of Auckland, there has been substantial increase of the QS ranking in the overall university category and in the new sustainability category. Further, in 2024, the University of Auckland reached the highest ranking since 2013 in the QS ranking being the 65th in the world. She has been invited as a keynote speaker in several international ranking event hosted by the Times Higher Education (THE) and Quacquarelli Symonds (QS).

In June 2025, Freshwater announced her intention to step down as vice-chancellor of the University of Auckland after nearly six years in the role. Chancellor Cecilia Tarrant confirmed their full support for Freshwater, rejecting speculation that she was asked to resign. During her tenure, she presided over controversial faculty consolidations and course cuts. Freshwater concluded her term as vice-chancellor of the University of Auckland on the 10 April 2026.

=== Publications ===
Freshwater has authored and co-authored over 100 peer reviewed papers. She is among the top 2% cited scientists, according to the 2023 Stanford/Elsevier ranking. Some of her works are:

- Rolfe, G., Freshwater, D., & Jasper, M. (2001). Critical reflection for nursing and the helping professions: a user's guide. Palgrave. ISBN 0333777956.
- Freshwater, D. (2002). Therapeutic Nursing. SAGE Publishing. ISBN 0761970649.
- Freshwater, D. (2002). Emotions and Needs (Core Concepts in Therapy). Open University Press. ISBN 0335208010.
- Freshwater, D. (2004). Blackwell's Nursing Dictionary. Wiley-Blackwell. ISBN 1405105348.
- Freshwater, D. (2005). Counselling Skills for Nurses, Midwives and Health Visitors. Open University Press. ISBN 0335207812.
- Freshwater, D. (2008). International Textbook of Reflective Practice in Nursing. Wiley-Blackwell. ISBN 9781405160513.
- Jacobs, M., & Freshwater, D. (2023). The Presenting Past (5th ed.). McGraw Hill Education, Oxford. ISBN 9780335251841.
- Rolfe, G., Freshwater, D., & Jasper, M. (2025). Critical Reflection for Health Professionals (3rd ed.). Routledge. ISBN 9781032749631.

=== Awards and honours ===
In 2001 Freshwater was elected Fellow of the Royal College of Nursing (FRCN).

== Controversies ==
During Dawn Freshwater’s tenure as Vice-Chancellor of the University of Auckland (2020–2026), several issues attracted public and internal criticism. One such issue was the university’s purchase of a residence in Parnell valued at approximately NZ$5 million for vice-chancellor use, which was later criticised by the Office of the Auditor-General for lacking a clear and robust business case. Her leadership also faced opposition over proposed structural reforms, including a plan to merge the Business School and Faculty of Law, which was ultimately abandoned following significant backlash from staff, students, and external stakeholders. In 2024, she encountered similar criticism from academics after the university’s governing body, the Senate, voted to halt a proposed curriculum overhaul due to concerns about extensive course reductions. Her tenure also coincided with wider debates over academic freedom and institutional direction, alongside reported declines in staff confidence in university leadership.

A complaint by Freshwater against Radio New Zealand regarding reporting on her travel during COVID-19 restrictions drew attention to tensions between privacy and public interest; the Media Council did not uphold the complaint. She was also involved in a dispute with prominent scientist Associate Professor Siouxsie Wiles, which resulted in the university being ordered to pay NZ$205,059.94 in compensation.

== Personal life ==
Freshwater is a marathon runner and has completed the London Marathon seven times.
