= Lists of university leaders =

For articles listing various university leaders around the world, please see individual national articles from the following countries:

- List of Australian university leaders
- List of British university chancellors and vice-chancellors
- List of Canadian university leaders
- List of Hong Kong university vice-chancellors and presidents
- List of Malaysian university leaders
- List of New Zealand university leaders
- List of South African university chancellors and vice-chancellors
- List of Tanzanian university chancellors and vice-chancellors
- List of Ugandan university leaders
- List of leaders of universities and colleges in the United States
