= George Currie (academic) =

Agricultural scientist, university professor and administrator (1896–1984)

Sir George Currie
- Born: 13 August 1896; Banffshire, Scotland
- Died: 4 May 1984 (aged 87); Canberra, ACT, Australia
- Occupations: Agricultural scientist University vice-chancellor
- Spouse: Margaret Smith (m. 1923)
- Children: 2
- Relatives: Neil Currie (son)

Sir George Alexander Currie (13 August 1896 – 4 May 1984) was an agricultural scientist, university professor and administrator. He was born in Grange, Banffshire, Scotland on 13 August 1896.

After serving in the Gordon Highlanders during the first world war, Currie studied at the University of Aberdeen, graduating in 1923 with BSc and BAgSc, including First Class Honours in zoology and geology. After graduation, Currie and his wife emigrated to Australia where he managed a sugar-cane plantation in Queensland. In 1926 he joined the Queensland Department of Agriculture and Stock as an assistant entomologist. In 1929 he moved to Canberra to take up a position with the Council for Scientific and Industry Research. He worked in the division of economic entomology and specialized in the biological control of noxious weeds. In 1937 he was promoted to principal research scientist.

In 1939 Currie was appointed to the University of Western Australia as the Hackett professor of agriculture. In the following year he acquired extra duties as part-time Vice Chancellor of the University and served in this role until 1945. Currie served as full-time Vice Chancellor of the University of Western Australia from 1945 to 1952, and Vice Chancellor of the University of New Zealand from 1952 until his retirement in 1962.

Currie was awarded the Queen Elizabeth II Coronation Medal in 1953, and was appointed a Knight Bachelor in the 1960 New Year Honours. Since 1960, one of the University of Western Australia's residential colleges has been named Currie Hall in honour of the University's second Vice Chancellor.

When Currie retired in 1962 he and his wife returned to Canberra. He chaired a working party on education that recommended in 1967 that the ACT should have its own system of education.

Curried died in Royal Canberra Hospital on 4 May 1984, aged 87.
