= 2008 in New Zealand =

- Decades: 1980s; 1990s; 2000s; 2010s; 2020s
- See also: History of New Zealand; List of years in New Zealand; Timeline of New Zealand history

The following lists events that happened during 2008 in New Zealand.

== Population ==
- Estimated population as of 31 December: 4,280,300.
- Increase since 31 December 2007: 34,500 (0.81%).
- Males per 100 Females: 95.7.

== Incumbents ==
=== Regal and vice regal ===
- Monarch – Elizabeth II
- Governor-General – Anand Satyanand
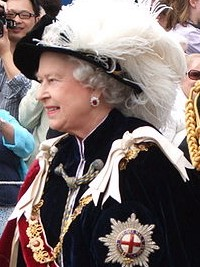
Elizabeth II

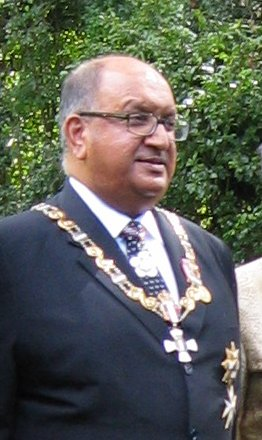
Anand Satyanand

=== Government ===
2008 was the third and last year of the 48th Parliament, which was dissolved on 3 October. A general election was held on 8 November to elect the 49th Parliament, which saw the Fifth National Government elected.

- Speaker of the House – Margaret Wilson then Lockwood Smith
- Prime Minister – Helen Clark to 19 November, then John Key
- Deputy Prime Minister – Michael Cullen to 19 November, then Bill English
- Minister of Finance – Michael Cullen to 19 November, then Bill English
- Minister of Foreign Affairs – Winston Peters to 29 August, then Helen Clark (acting) to 19 November, then Murray McCully
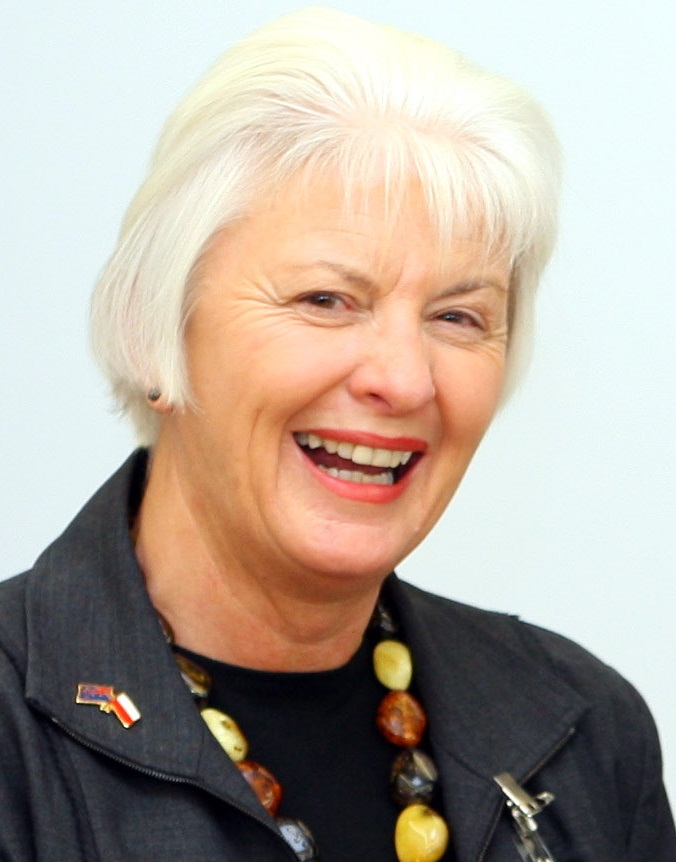
Margaret Wilson

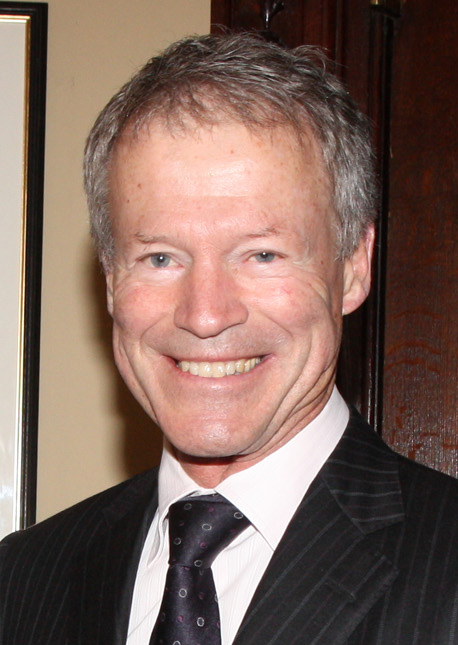
Lockwood Smith

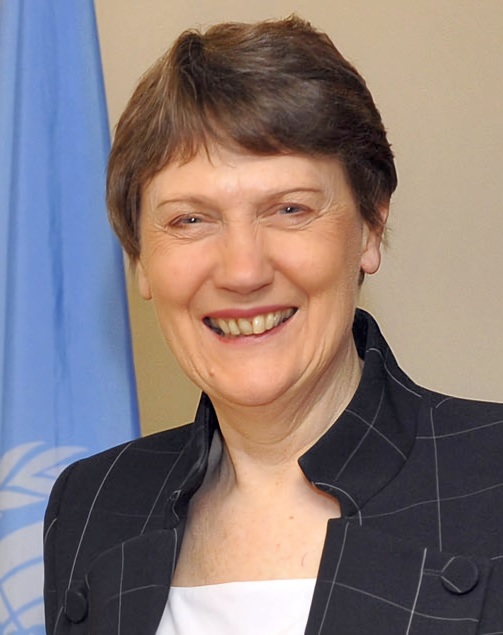
Helen Clark

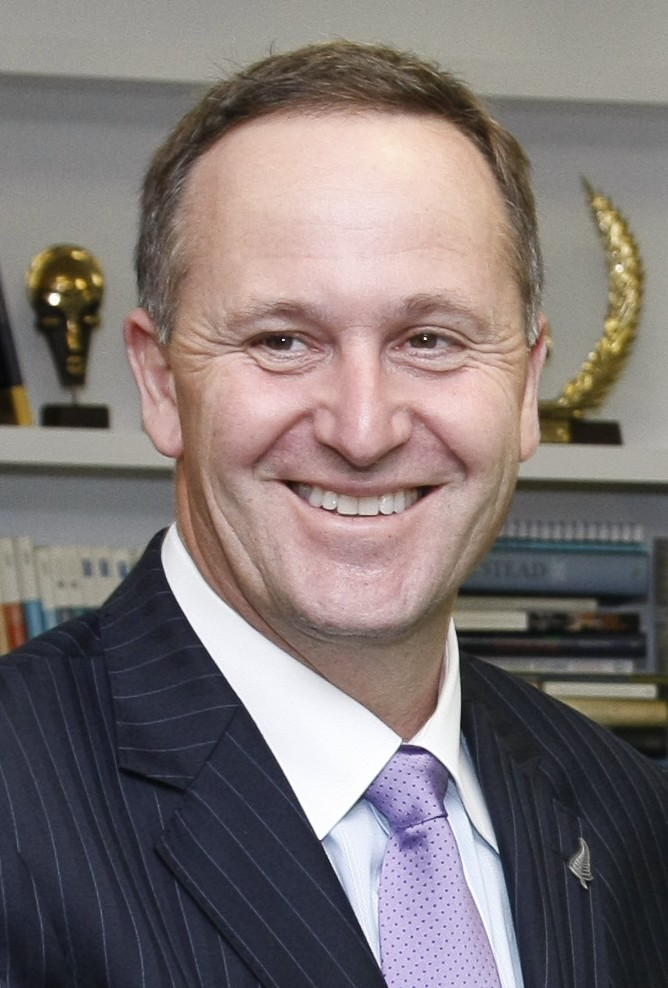
John Key

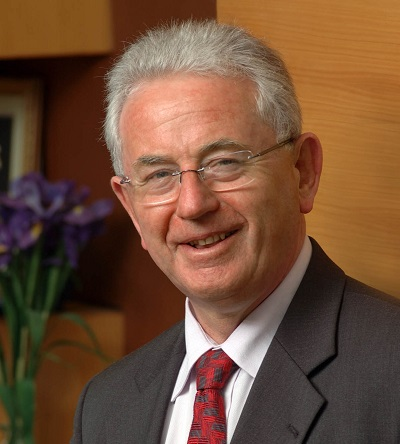
Michael Cullen

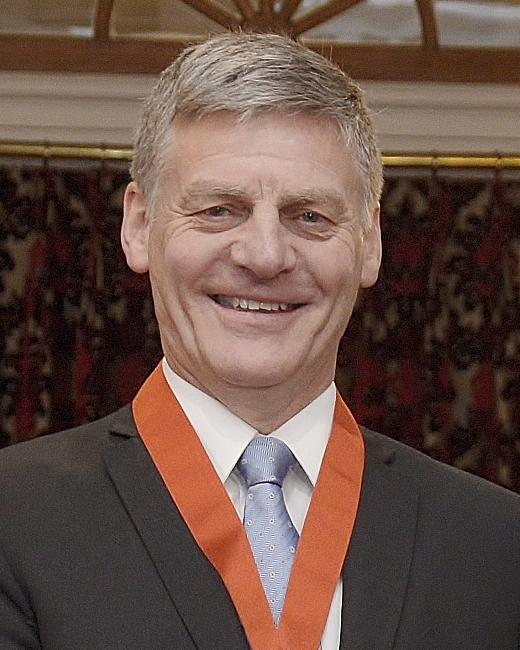
Bill English

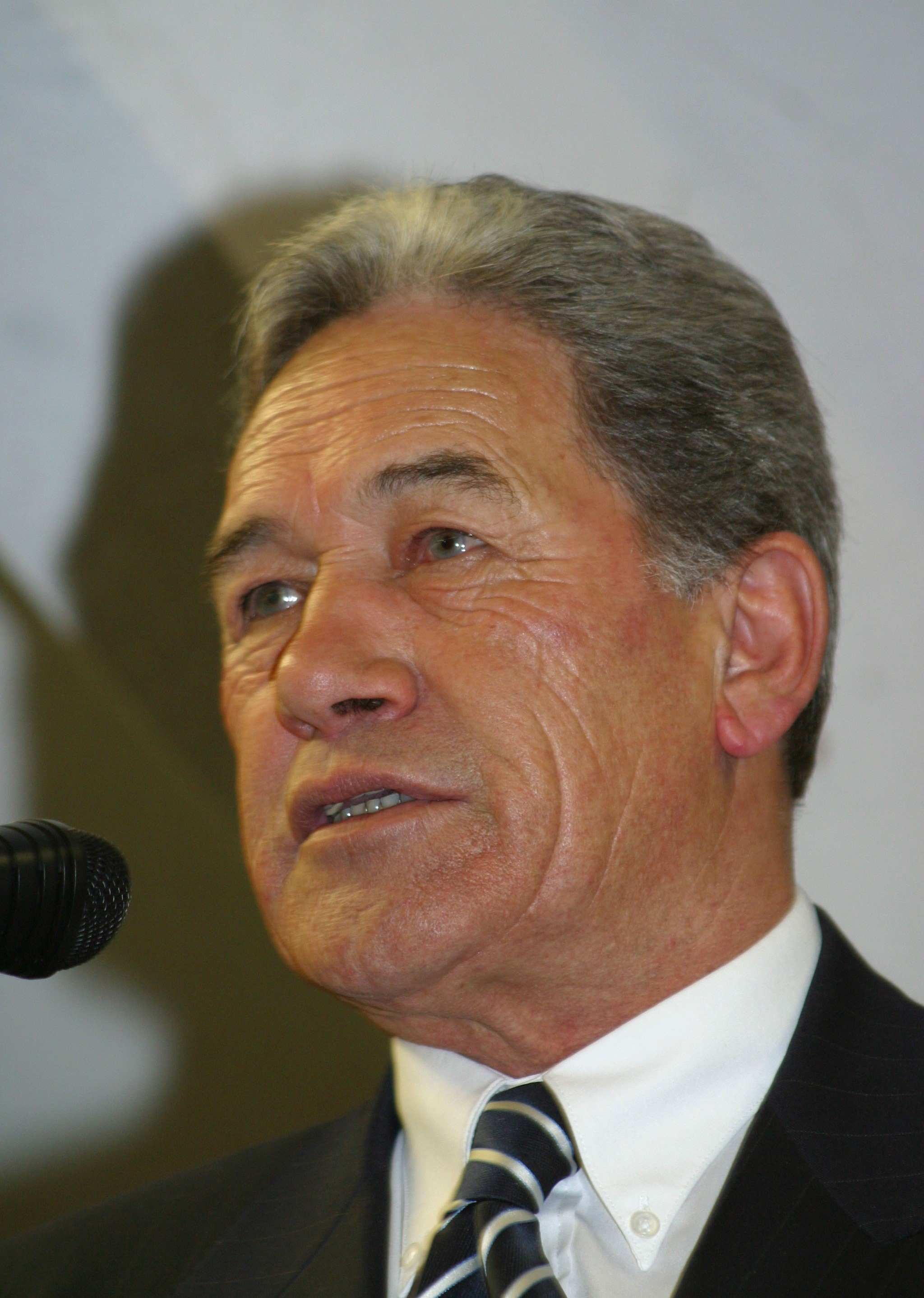
Winston Peters

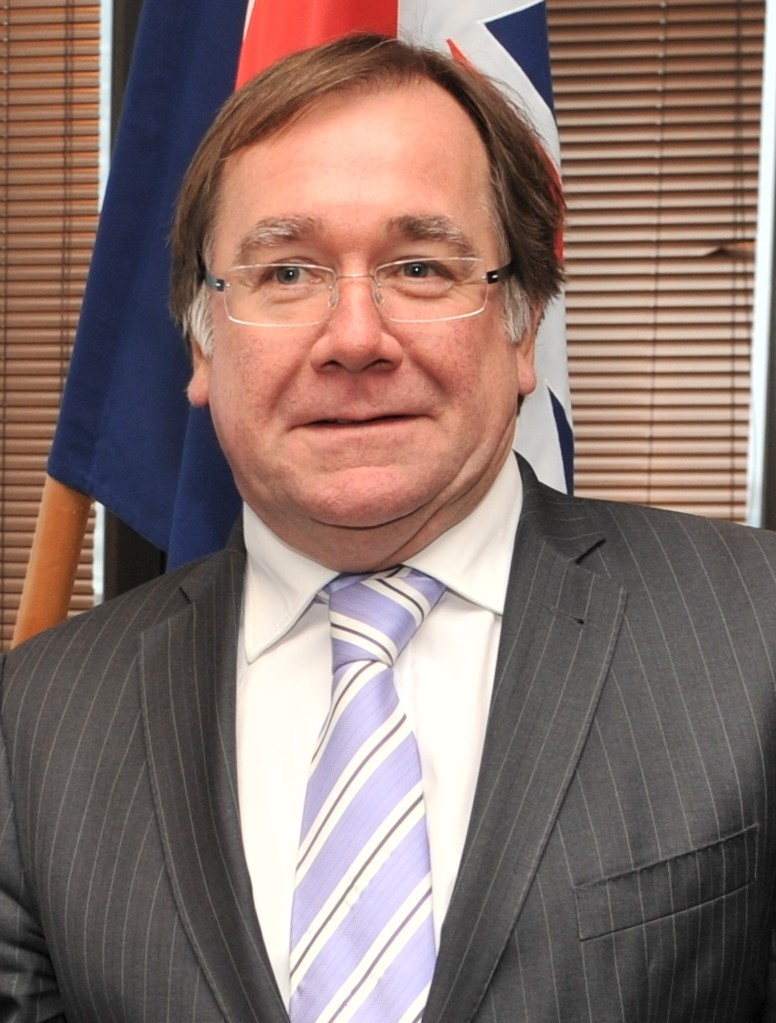
Murray McCully

=== Party leaders ===
- Labour – Helen Clark to 11 November, then Phil Goff
- National – John Key
- Progressive – Jim Anderton
- New Zealand First – Winston Peters
- United Future – Peter Dunne
- Act – Rodney Hide
- Greens – Jeanette Fitzsimons and Russel Norman
- Māori Party – Tariana Turia and Pita Sharples
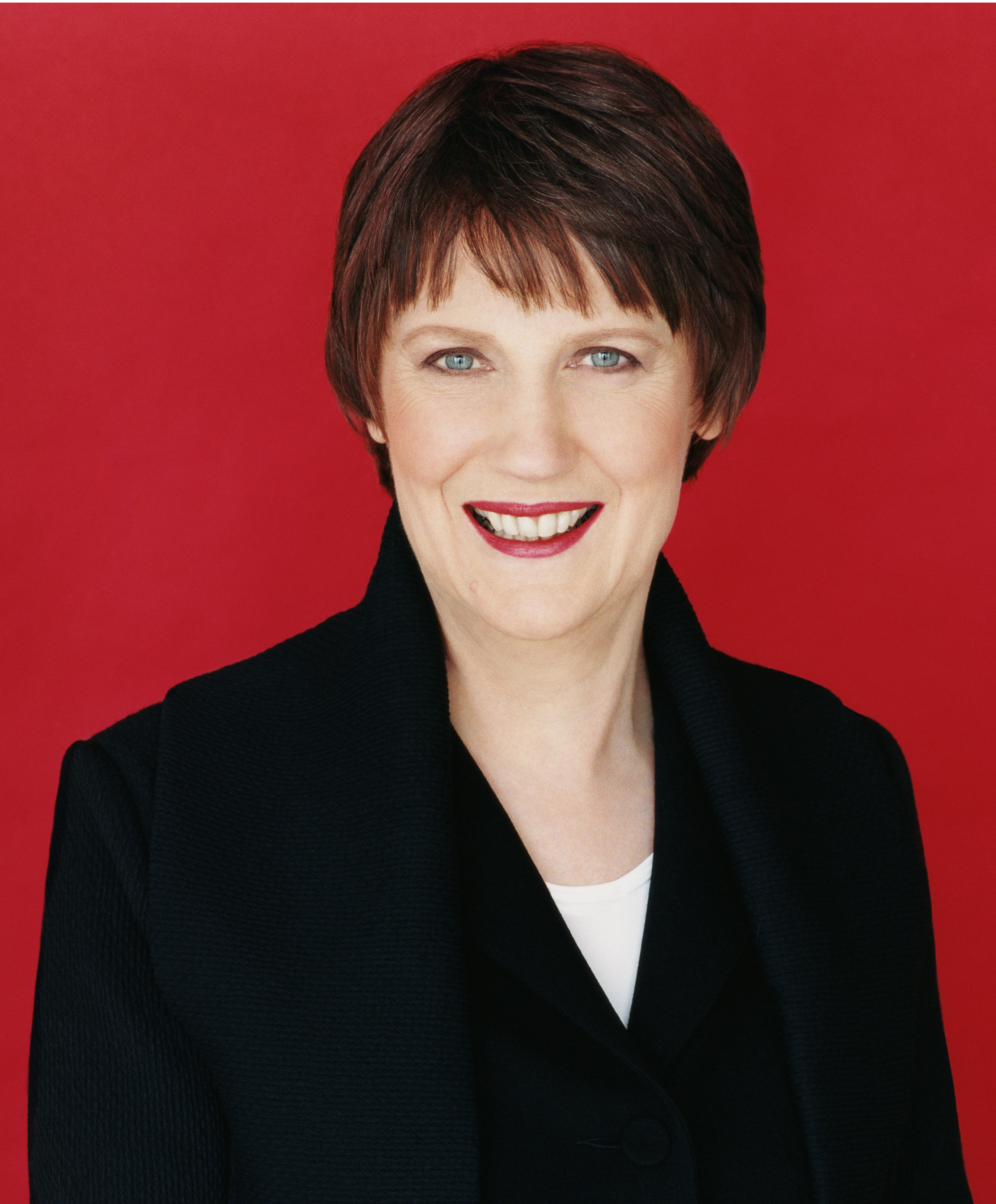
Helen Clark

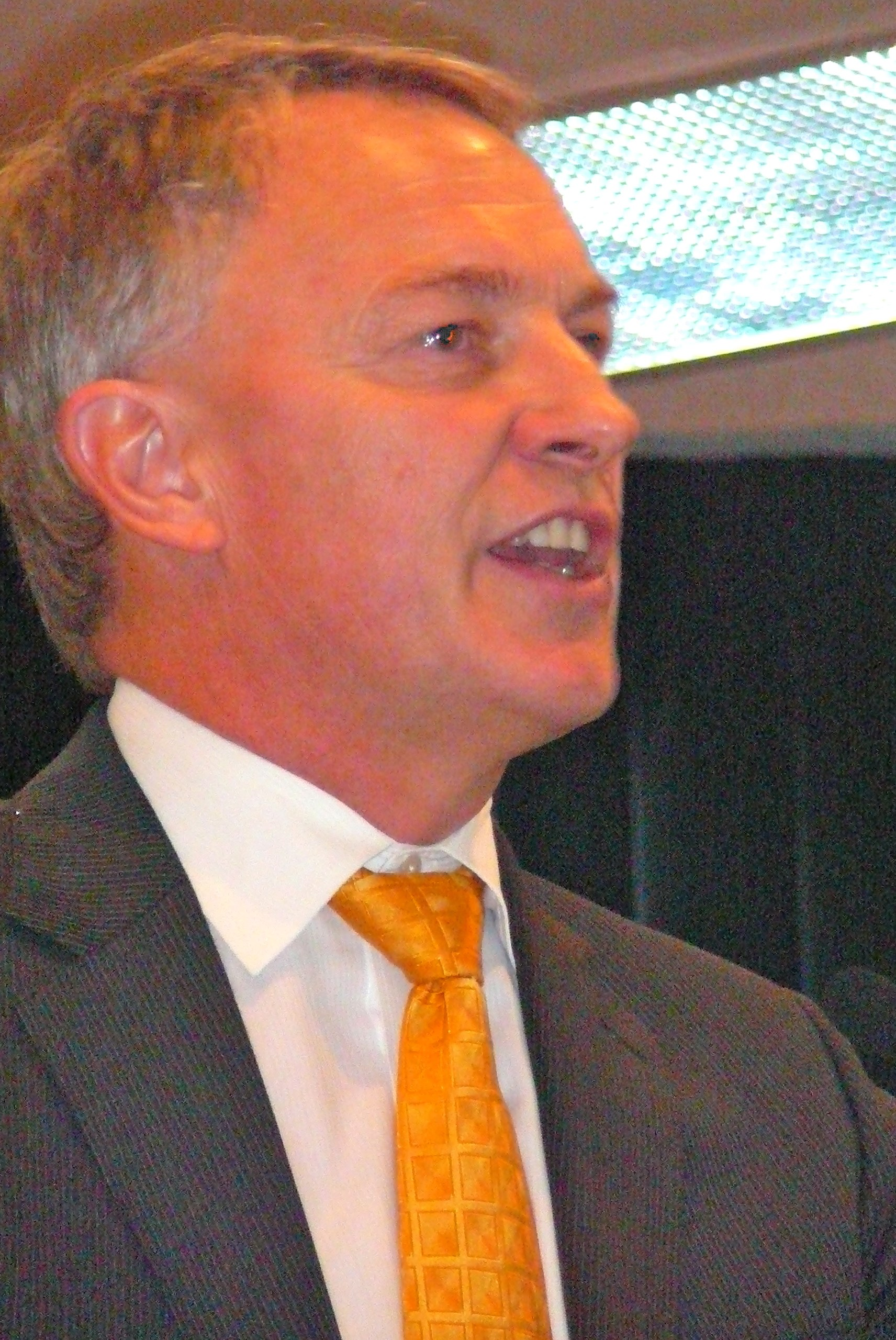
Phil Goff

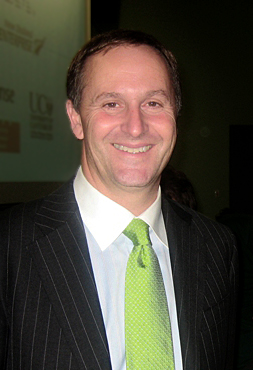
John Key

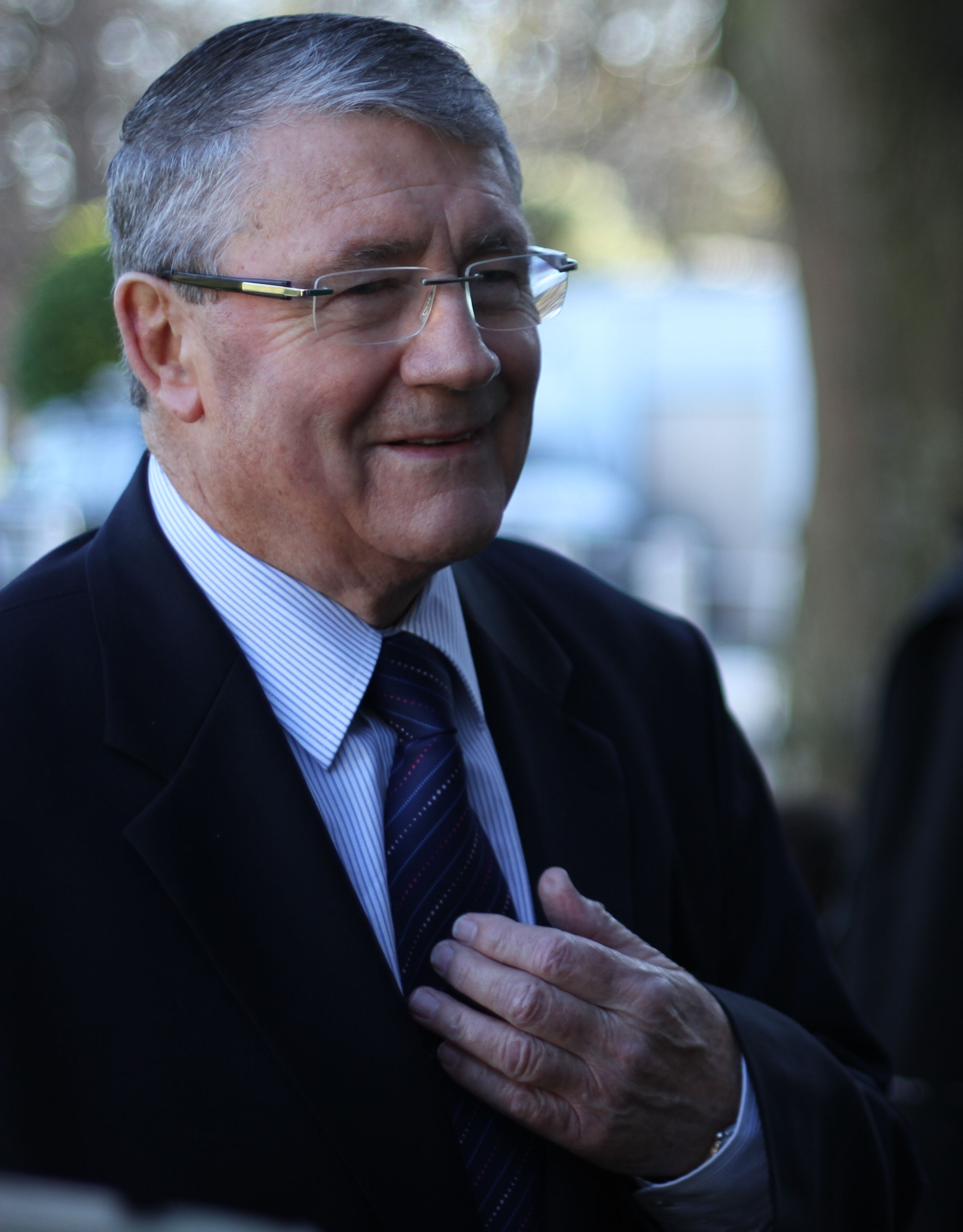
Jim Anderton

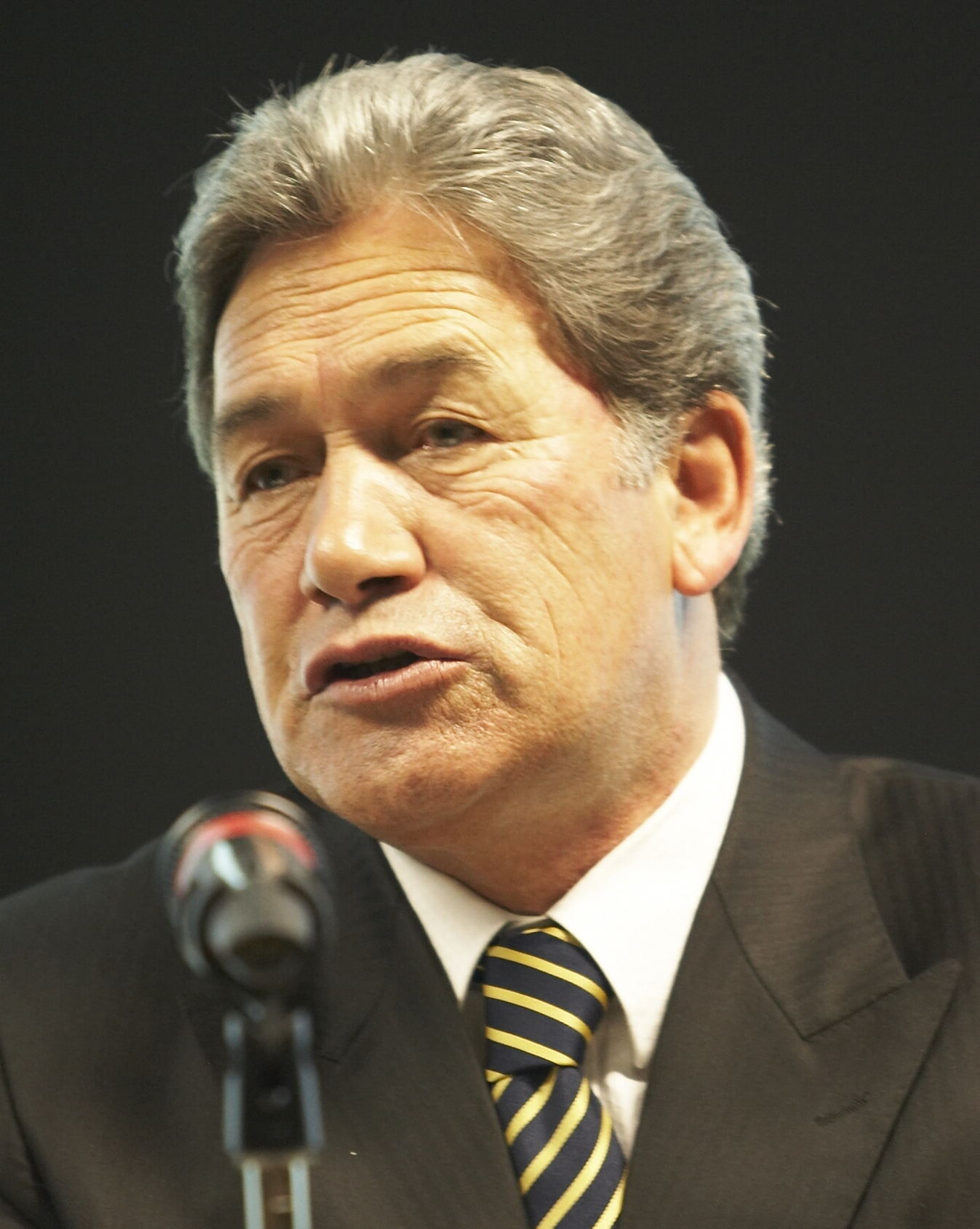
Winston Peters

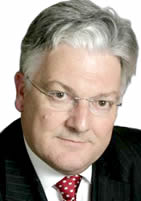
Peter Dunne

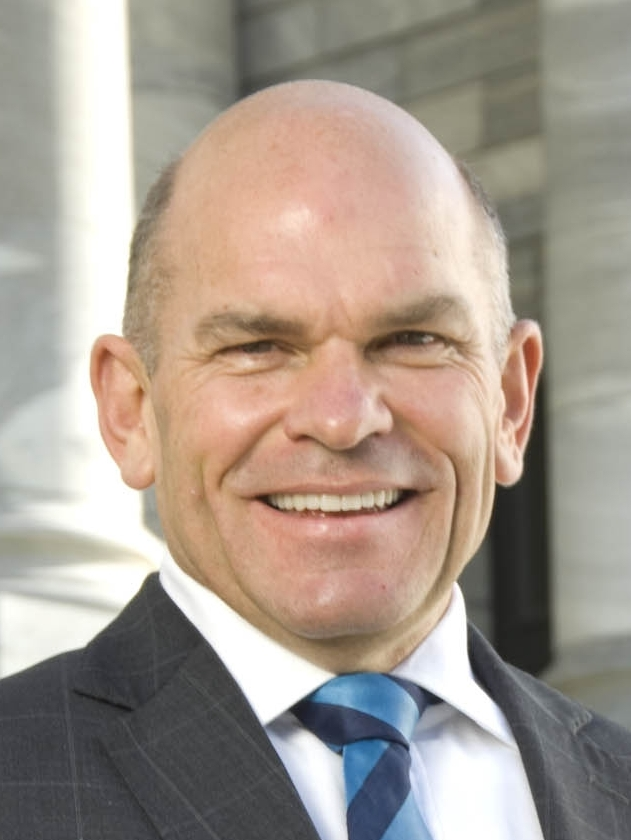
Rodney Hide

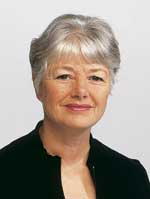
Jeanette Fitzsimons

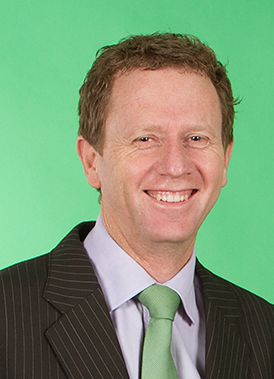
Russel Norman

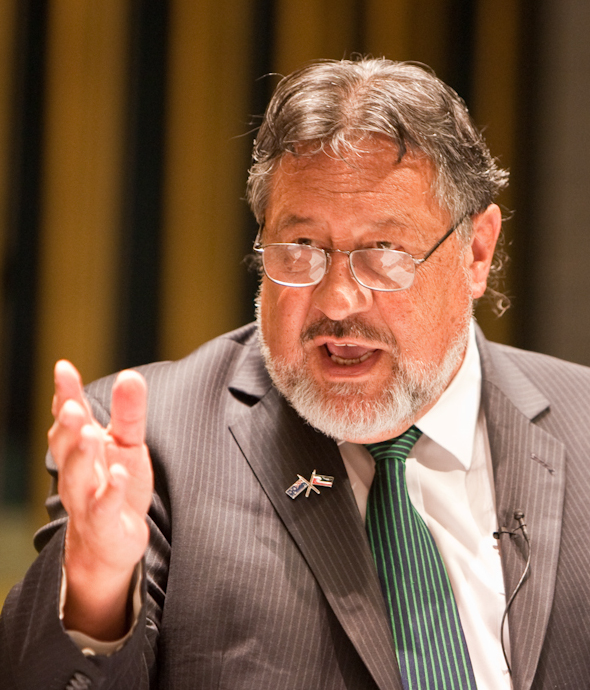
Pita Sharples

=== Judiciary ===
- Chief Justice — Sian Elias
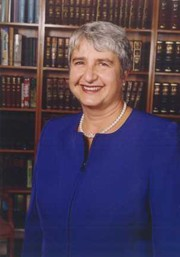
Dame Sian Elias

=== Main centre leaders ===
- Mayor of Auckland – John Banks
- Mayor of Tauranga – Stuart Crosby
- Mayor of Hamilton – Bob Simcock
- Mayor of Wellington – Kerry Prendergast
- Mayor of Christchurch – Bob Parker
- Mayor of Dunedin – Peter Chin
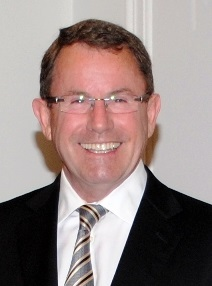
John Banks

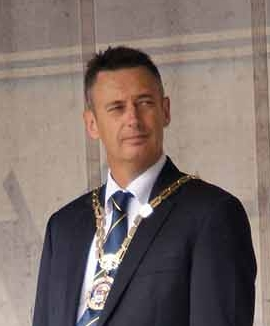
Stuart Crosby

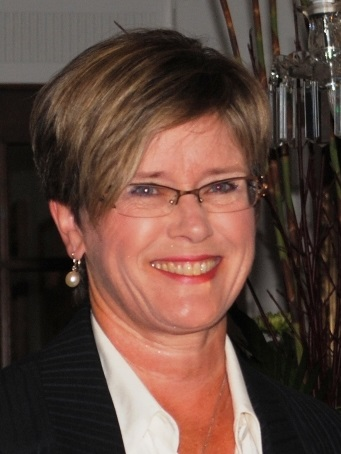
Kerry Prendergast

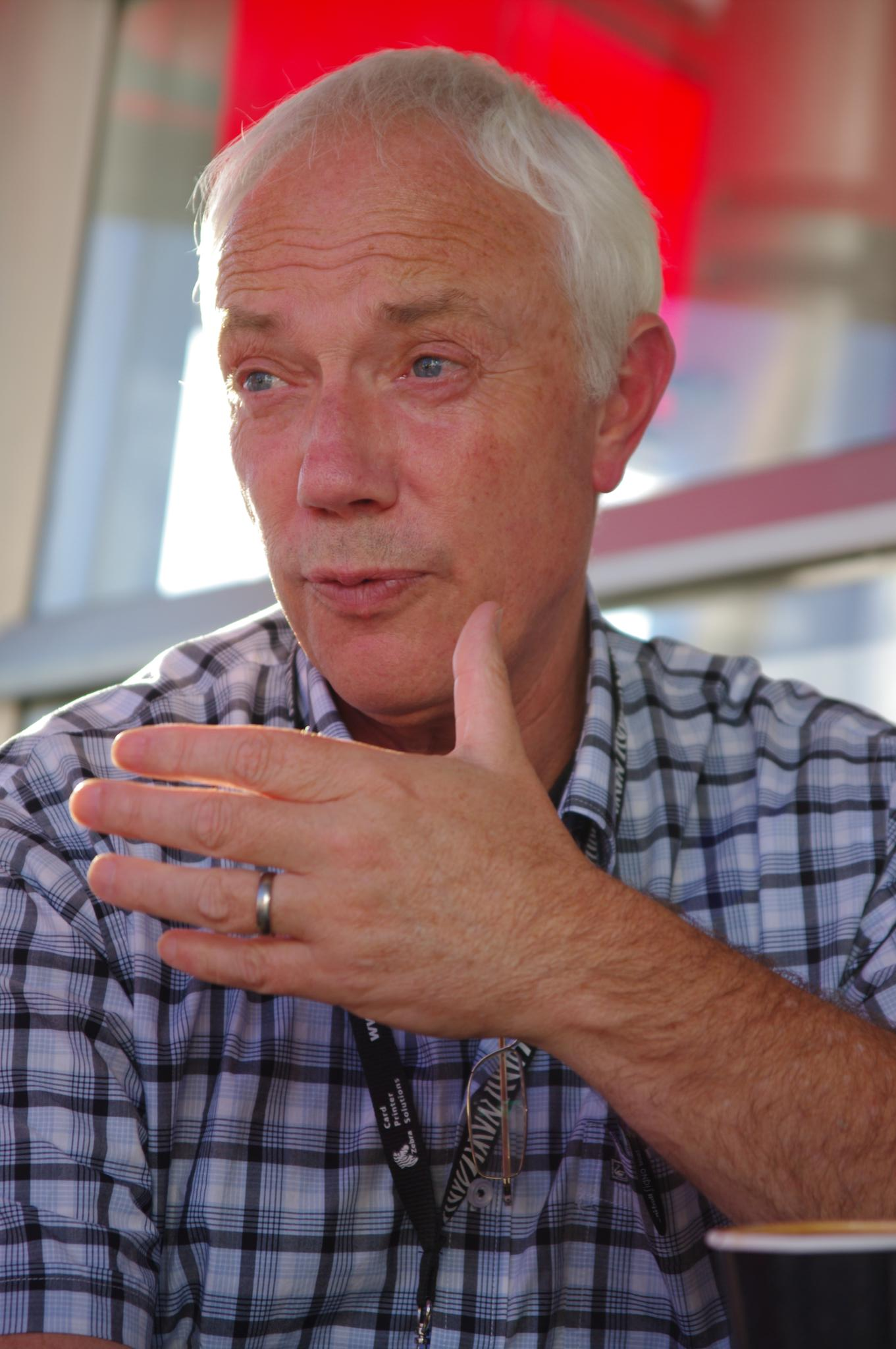
Bob Parker

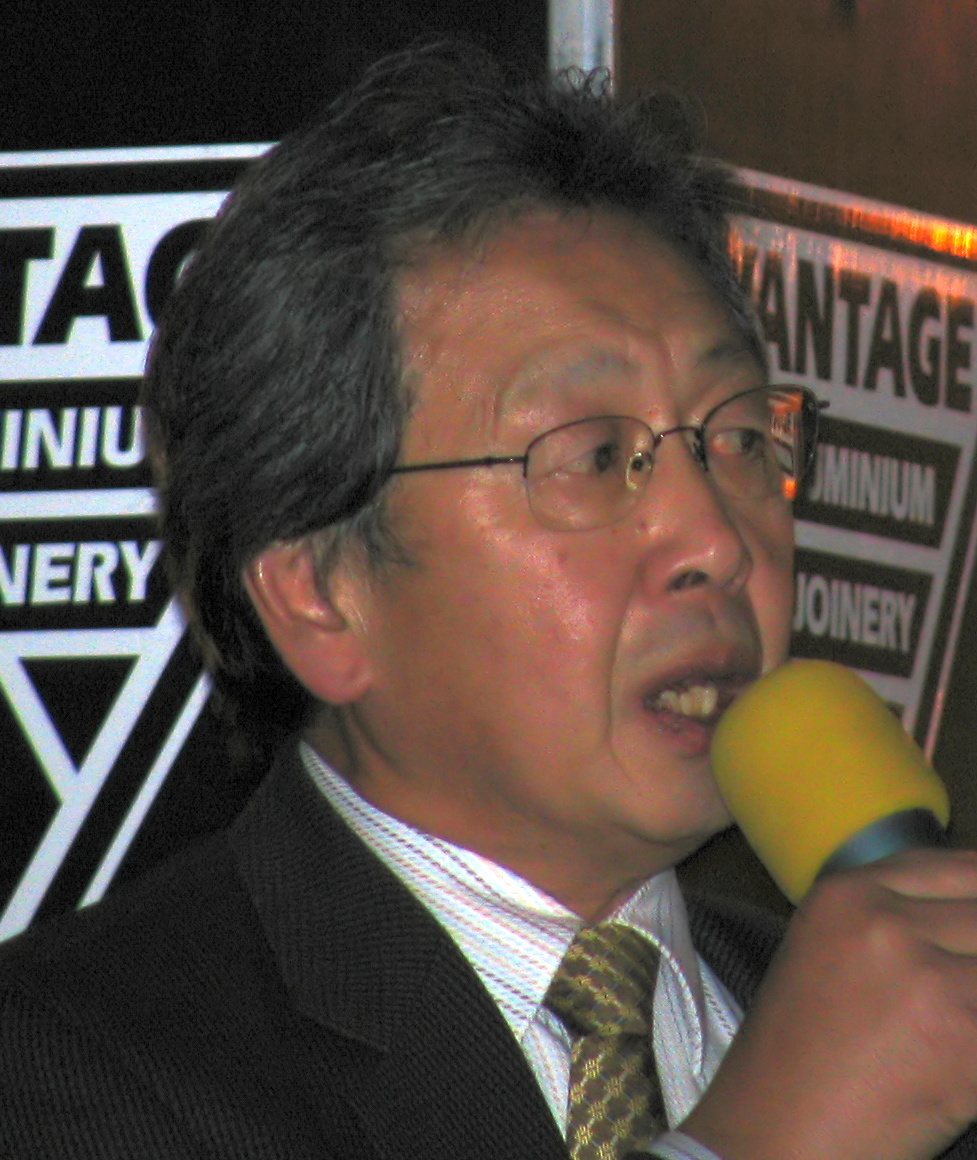
Peter Chin

== Events ==
=== January ===
- 22 January – State funeral for Sir Edmund Hillary

=== February ===
- 17 February – A helicopter and a Cessna 152 collide mid-air in Paraparaumu, causing the deaths of three people. The aeroplane hit the roof of a house, and the helicopter fell onto a PlaceMakers store.

=== April ===
- 5 April – A propane explosion at a coolstore in Tamahere kills firefighter senior station officer Derek Lovell, and seriously injures seven others.

=== May ===
- 8 May – The Tapuae Marine Reserve is established.

=== June ===
- 5 June – A newly redesigned flag for the Governor General of New Zealand is flown for the first time at Government House, Auckland.

=== July ===
- 1 July – Rail transport network is renationalised as KiwiRail
- 11 July – Police Sergeant Derek Wootton (52) is struck and killed by a vehicle fleeing police, while laying road spikes at Titahi Bay.
- 30 July – A state of emergency is declared in Marlborough due to flooding.

=== August ===
- 1 August – Crown entities Land Transport New Zealand and Transit New Zealand merge to form the NZ Transport Agency
- 16 August – Dunedin Hospital is put in lockdown for a week after approximately 170 staff and patients fall ill to a norovirus outbreak, resulting in 2,300 appointments and procedures being delayed.

=== September ===
- 5 September – Fonterra advise Prime Minister Helen Clark of the 2008 baby milk scandal.
- 7 September – The Taputeranga Marine Reserve is opened.
- 11 September – Undercover police Sergeant Don Wilkinson (47) is fatally shot in Māngere, after being discovered attempting to secretly fix a tracking device to a car.
- 24 September - GO Wellington dispute - an industrial dispute between the GO Wellington bus company and drivers

=== October ===
On the 17th The Dominion Post Billboard Heading Reads "Market Madness" There is also a graph on the Billboard showing the NZX taking a big dive . This was indicative of the worlds sharemarkets in turmoil.

=== November ===
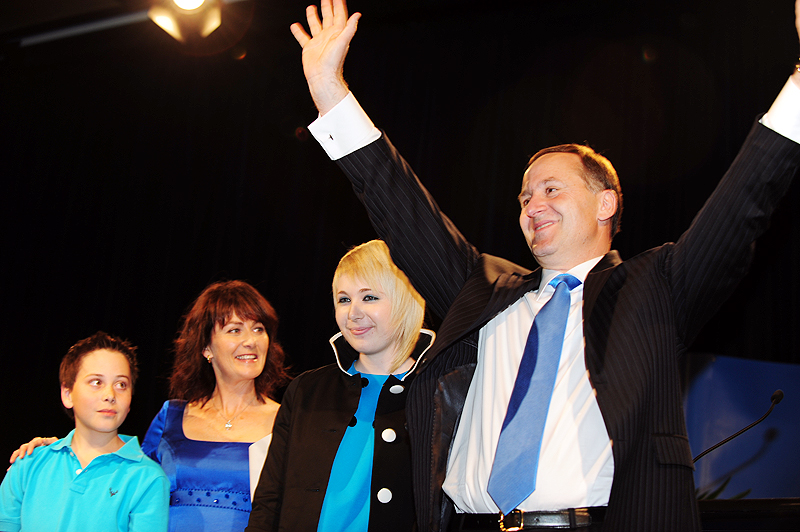
John Key and his family (his wife, Bronagh, daughter Steffi (15), and son Max (13)) celebrate victory in the 2008 general election at the SkyCity in Auckland, in November 2008.

- 8 November – John Key and the New Zealand National Party win the 2008 general election. John Key is able to form a Government and in Helen Clark's speech that she resigns as leader of the New Zealand Labour Party.
- 9 November – Michael Cullen resigns as deputy leader of the Labour Party.
- 19 November – John Key is sworn in as Prime Minister of New Zealand.
- 27 November – 2008 Air New Zealand A320 test flight crash. Air New Zealand A320 Airbus crashes into the Mediterranean during a test flight, killing five New Zealand and two German air crew.

=== Holidays and observances ===
- 6 February – Waitangi Day
- 21 March – Good Friday
- 23 March – Easter Sunday
- 24 March – Easter Monday
- 25 April – Anzac Day
- 2 June – Queen's Birthday
- 5 June – Matariki
- 27 October – Labour Day

== Arts and literature ==
=== New books ===
- Brower, Ann (August 2008). Who Owns the High Country? The controversial story of tenure review in New Zealand. New Zealand: Nelson: Craig Potton Publishing. ISBN 978-1-877333-78-1.
- Catton, Eleanor (2008). The Rehearsal. New Zealand: Victoria University Press. ISBN 978-1-84708-116-2.

=== Awards ===
- BPANZ Book Design Awards - In association with Spectrum Print and the New Zealand Listener id=13
- BEST BOOK Title: Bill Hammond: Jingle Jangle Morning
- BEST COVER Winner: Bill Hammond: Jingle Jangle Morning
- NON-ILLUSTRATED Winner: Dear to Me
- ILLUSTRATED Winner: Bill Hammond: Jingle Jangle Morning
- EDUCATIONAL Winner: Astronomy Aotearoa NCEA Level 1 by Robert Shaw ISBN 978-0-7339-9261-2
- CHILDREN’S Winner: The King's Bubbles by Ruth Paul

=== Music ===
- May - New Zealand Music Month
- 3 September: Technical Awards for the Vodafone New Zealand Music Awards
- 8 October: Vodafone New Zealand Music Awards

=== Performing arts ===
- Benny Award presented by the Variety Artists Club of New Zealand to Suzanne Lynch MNZM.

=== Television ===
- Freeview|HD Digital television is launched.
- The country's first Chinese television channel, CTV8 (Chinese Television 8) is launched in early October.

== Sport ==
=== Cricket ===
- New Zealand men's cricket team, the Black Caps plays three test matches against England and draws the series, each team having won a game

=== Horse racing ===
==== Harness racing ====
- New Zealand Trotting Cup: Changeover
- Auckland Trotting Cup: Gotta Go Cullen

=== Netball ===
- The ANZ Netball Championship begins in April 2008.

=== Olympic Games ===
- New Zealand sends a team of 182 competitors across 17 sports.

Gold	Silver	Bronze	Total
3	2	4	9

=== Paralympics ===
- New Zealand sends a team of 30 competitors across seven sports.

Gold	Silver	Bronze	Total
5	3	4	12

=== Rugby league ===
- The New Zealand national rugby league team won the 2008 Rugby League World Cup.
- The New Zealand Warriors finished 8th in the National Rugby League and in the playoffs made it through to the semi-finals, beating minor premiers the Melbourne Storm in the progress.
- The inaugural season of the new Bartercard Premiership saw Auckland defeat Canterbury 38-10 in the grand final.

=== Shooting ===
- Ballinger Belt – Brian Carter (Te Puke)

=== Soccer ===
- 30 October – 16 November – New Zealand hosts the inaugural FIFA U-17 Women's World Cup. Matches are held in Albany, Christchurch, Hamilton and Wellington.
- The Chatham Cup is won by East Coast Bays AFC who beat Dunedin Technical 1—0 in the final.

== Births ==
- 17 March - Nate Wilbourne, environmentalist and activist
- 12 April – Luke Harrold, freestyle skier
- 12 August – Dwayne Li, figure skater
- 18 September – Silent Achiever, Thoroughbred racehorse
- 23 September – Zurella, Thoroughbred racehorse
- 13 October – Ocean Park, Thoroughbred racehorse

== Deaths ==
=== January ===
- 1 January – Joan Dingley, mycologist (born 1916)
- 2 January – Lindsay Poole, botanist and forester (born 1908)
- 4 January
  - Graham Percy, artist, designer and illustrator (born 1938)
  - Bert Walker, politician (born 1919)
- 6 January – Charlie Steele, Jr., association football player (born 1930)
- 10 January – Sir George Laking, diplomat (born 1912)
- 11 January – Sir Edmund Hillary, mountaineer, explorer and philanthropist (born 1919)
- 16 January – Hone Tuwhare, poet (born 1922)

=== February ===
- 12 February – Ron Chippindale, pilot, air accident investigator (born 1933)
- 14 February – June Schoch, athlete (born 1926)
- 16 February – K. Radway Allen, fisheries biologist (born 1911)
- 19 February – Barry Barclay, filmmaker (born 1944)
- 28 February – Peter Bannister, botanist (born 1939)

=== March ===
- 13 March – Tessa Birnie, concert pianist (born 1934)
- 18 March – Ruth Dallas, poet and children's author (born 1919)
- 21 March – Merv Wallace, cricketer (born 1916)

=== April ===
- 2 April – Sir Geoffrey Cox, newspaper and television journalist (born 1910)
- 6 April – Tony Davies, rugby union player (born 1939)
- 10 April – Greg Hough, association football player (born 1958)
- 11 April – Fraser Colman, politician (born 1925)
- 12 April – Dame Augusta Wallace, jurist, first woman District Court judge (born 1929)
- 15 April – Mahinārangi Tocker singer–songwriter (born 1955)

=== May ===
- 4 May – Colin Murdoch, pharmacist, veterinarian and inventor (born 1929)
- 8 May – William L. Holland, Pacific affairs academic (born 1907)
- 20 May – Mihi Edwards, writer, social worker, teacher (born 1918)

=== June ===
- 1 June – Doug Zohrab, diplomat (born 1917)
- 4 June – John Armitt, wrestler (born 1925)
- 5 June
  - Colin Kay, athlete and politician, mayor of Auckland (1980–83) (born 1926)
  - Bruce Purchase, actor (born 1938)
- 24 June
  - Neill Austin, politician (born 1924)
  - Charlie Dempsey, association football administrator (born 1921)
- 27 June – Lyn Davis, rugby union player (born 1943)
- 30 June – Just An Excuse, Standardbred racehorse (foaled 1998)

=== July ===
- 16 July – Bob Walton, police officer (born 1921)
- 17 July – Sir Graham Speight, jurist (born 1921)
- 25 July – Walter Metcalf, physical chemistry academic (born 1918)
- 31 July – Falani Aukuso, Tokelauan public servant

=== August ===
- 6 August – Ken Going, rugby union player (born 1942)
- 9 August – Bob Cunis, cricket player and coach (born 1941)
- 16 August – Rei Hamon, artist (born 1919)
- 25 August – Hardwicke Knight, historian and photographer (born 1911)
- 31 August – Victor Yates, rugby union and league player (born 1939)

=== September ===
- 7 September – Sir Hamish Hay, politician, mayor of Christchurch (1974–89) (born 1927)
- 8 September – Ron Guthrey, soldier, politician, mayor of Christchurch (1968–71) (born 1916)
- 11 September – Sue Garden-Bachop, rugby union player, coach and administrator (born c.1961)
- 13 September – Duncan Laing, swimming coach (born 1933)
- 15 September
  - Peter Hanan, swimmer (born 1915)
  - Arthur Stubbs, soldier, oldest New Zealand war veteran (born 1904)
- 21 September – Al Hobman, professional wrestler (born 1925)
- 25 September
  - Wynne Bradburn, cricketer (born 1938)
  - Brian Donnelly, politician and diplomat (born 1949)

=== October ===
- 2 October – Rob Guest, actor and singer (born 1950)
- 14 October – Dame Daphne Purves, educator (born 1908)
- 15 October – Des Townson, yacht designer (born 1934)
- 26 October – Neil Purvis, rugby union player (born 1953)
- 29 October – John Darwin, statistician and public servant (born 1923)

=== November ===
- 6 November – Kevin J. Sharpe, mathematician, theologian and archaeologist (born 1950)
- 7 November – Hedley Howarth, cricketer (born 1943)
- 8 November – Hugh Cook, science fiction writer (born 1956)
- 27 November – Mike Minogue, politician (born 1923)
- 29 November – Robert Wade, chess player (born 1921)

=== December ===
- 6 December – Peter Wardle, plant ecologist (born 1931)
- 13 December – John Drake, rugby union player (born 1959)
- 16 December – Peg Batty, cricketer (born 1920)
- 24 December – Ian Ballinger, sports shooter (born 1925)

== See also ==
- List of years in New Zealand
- Timeline of New Zealand history
- History of New Zealand
- Military history of New Zealand
- Timeline of the New Zealand environment
- Timeline of New Zealand's links with Antarctica

For world events and topics in 2008 not specifically related to New Zealand see: 2008
