= 2006 Special Honours (New Zealand) =

Awards list for New Zealand

- Previous: 2006 Queen's Birthday Honours; Next: 2006 bravery awards
- Type: New Zealand royal honours: Queen's Service Order
- Date: 2 August 2006
- Country: New Zealand

Highlights
- Total recipients: 2

The 2006 Special Honours in New Zealand was a Special Honours List, published in New Zealand on 3 August 2006 and effective from the previous day. Appointments were made to the Queen's Service Order to recognise the outgoing governor-general, Dame Silvia Cartwright, and vice-regal consort, Peter Cartwright.

== Additional Companion of the Queen's Service Order (QSO) ==
For community service

- Peter John Cartwright CNZM

For public services

- The Honourable Dame Silvia Rose Cartwright PCNZM DBE
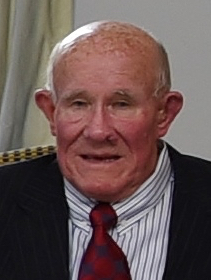
Peter Cartwright

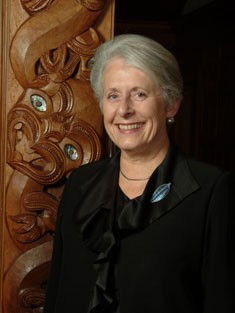
Dame Silvia Cartwright
