= 2006 Birthday Honours (New Zealand) =

Awards list for New Zealand

2006 Queen's Birthday Honours
- Previous: 2006 New Year Honours; Next: 2006 Special Honours
- Type: New Zealand royal honours: New Zealand Order of Merit; Queen's Service Order; Queen's Service Medal
- Date: 5 June 2006
- Country: New Zealand

Highlights
- Total recipients: 200

The 2006 Queen's Birthday Honours in New Zealand, celebrating the official birthday of Queen Elizabeth II, were appointments made by the Queen in her right as Queen of New Zealand, on the advice of the New Zealand government, to various orders and honours to reward and highlight good works by New Zealanders. They were announced on 5 June 2006.

The recipients of honours are listed here as they were styled before their new honour.

== New Zealand Order of Merit ==
=== Principal Companion (PCNZM) ===
Additional

- Anand Satyanand DCNZM – of Wellington; governor-general designate.
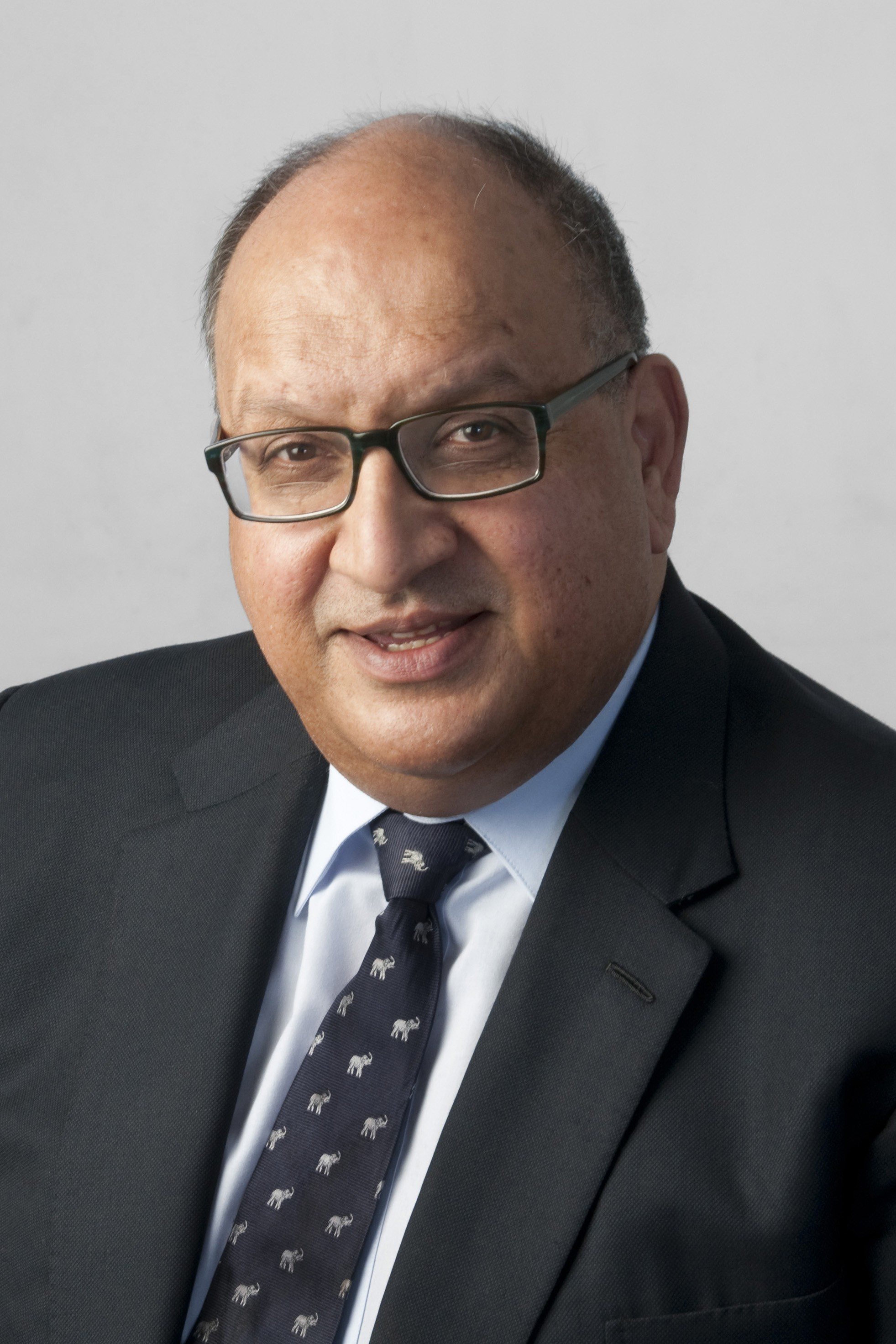
Anand Satyanand

=== Distinguished Companion (DCNZM) ===
- Christine Cole Catley QSM – of North Shore City. For services to literature.
- Air Marshal Bruce Reid Ferguson OBE AFC (retd) – of Wellington. For services to the New Zealand Defence Force, lately as Chief of Defence Force.
- Sidney Moko Mead – of Wellington. For services to education and the Māori people.
- Noel Stuart Robinson – of Auckland. For services to business and the community.
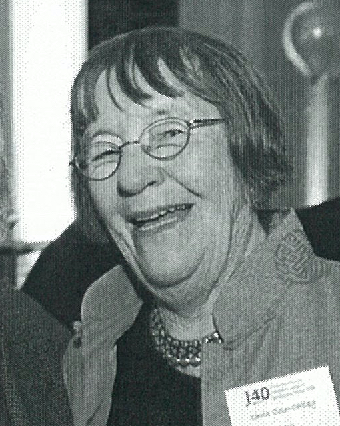
Christine Cole Catley

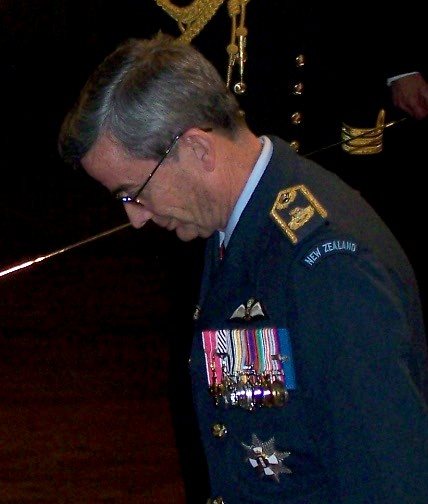
Bruce Ferguson

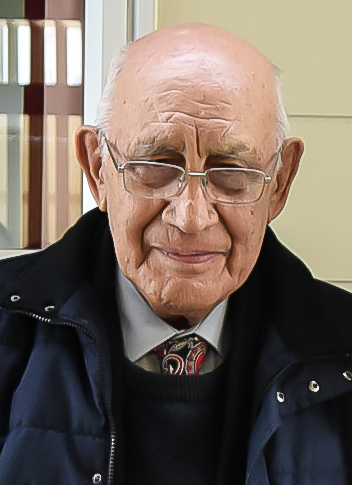
Hirini Moko Mead

=== Companion (CNZM) ===
- Marie Bell – of Wellington. For services to early childhood education.
- Richard John Bentley – of Wellington. For services to business, education and the community.
- Peter John Cartwright – of Wellington. For public services and services to the community.
- Mary Frances Hackett – of Mt Maunganui. For services to health administration and business.
- Air Vice-Marshal John Henry Staples Hamilton ONZM MVO (retd) – of Wellington. For services to the Royal New Zealand Air Force.
- Michael James Bowie (Jock) Hobbs MNZM – of Wellington. For services to rugby and sports administration.
- Professor Emeritus Alick Charles Kibblewhite – of North Shore City. For services to marine science and education.
- Andrew James Duncan Laing OBE – of Dunedin. For services to sport.
- Ian Dallas Leggat QSO – of Christchurch. For services to education and the community.
- The Honourable Colin Maurice Nicholson QC – of Auckland. For services as a judge of the High Court of New Zealand.
- Karen Olive Poutasi – of Wellington. For services to health administration, lately as Director General of Health.
- Linda Evelyn Sissons – of Wellington. For services to tertiary education.
- Lynette Merle Stewart – of Whangārei. For services to health administration.
- James Douglas Watson – of Auckland. For services to scientific and medical research.
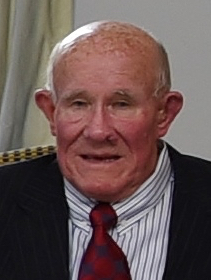
Peter Cartwright

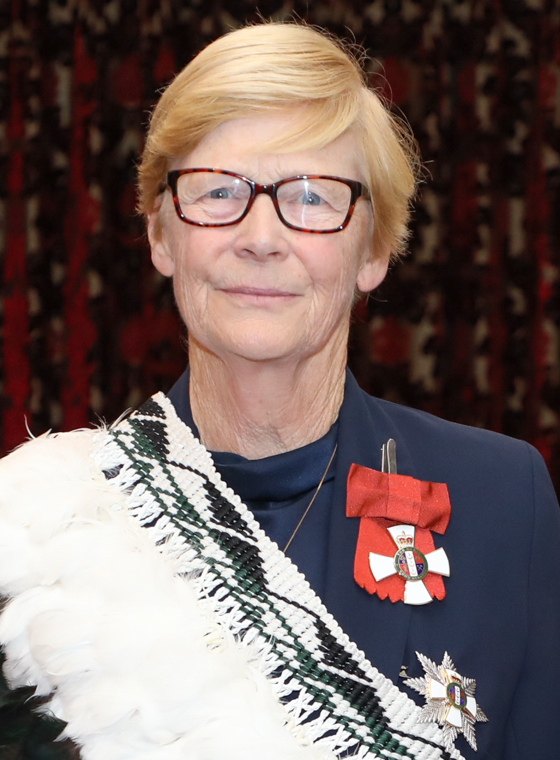
Karen Poutasi

=== Officer (ONZM) ===
- Norman Matheson Beaumont – of Dunedin. For services to photography and the community.
- Professor James Christopher Belich – of Auckland. For services to historical research.
- Associate Professor Dorothy Anne Bray – of Dunedin. For services to medical research.
- Brenda Margaret Cutress – of Wellington. For services to business and the community.
- Caterina Maria De Nave – of Auckland. For services to television and film.
- Gareth Farr – of Wellington. For services to music and entertainment.
- Brigadier Kenneth Eric Foote ED – New Zealand Army Territorial Force.
- Fay Freeman JP – of North Shore City. For services to netball and sports administration.
- Peter Gerald Gillespie – of Palmerston North. For services to business and sport.
- Charles Raymond Henwood – of Wellington. For services to film and the theatre.
- Tama Turanga Huata – of Hastings. For services to Māori performing arts.
- Donald Henderson McRae – of Auckland. For services to architecture and the community.
- Elizabeth Helen McRae – of Auckland. For services to the theatre.
- Sister Margaret Anne Mills – of Wellington. For services to the community.
- Faipule Ionatana Galway O'Brien – of Fakaofo Village, Tokelau. For services to the Tokelau Islands.
- Lieutenant Commander Alistair Ian Hughes Paterson – Royal New Zealand Navy (retd); of Auckland. For services to literature.
- Charles Jonathan Pope – of Wellington. For services to business.
- Emeritus Professor Alastair Gardner Rothwell – of Christchurch. For services to musculoskeletal medicine.
- Te Paekiomeka Joy (Pae) Ruha QSM – of Wellington. For services to Māori.
- Professor Ronald Andrew Sharp – of London, United Kingdom (lately of Auckland). For services to political science.
- Malcolm Tukino Short – of Rotorua. For services to Māori.
- Brent Edward Stanley – of Christchurch. For services to dentistry.
- George Gregory Taylor – of Auckland. For services to education.
- Renée Gertrude Taylor – of Wellington. For services to literature and drama.
- James Edward Traue – of Wellington. For services to the library profession.
- Faipule Pio Iosefo Tuia – of Nukunonu Village, Tokelau. For services to the Tokelau Islands.
- Jonathan Falefasa (Tana) Umaga – of Wellington. For services to rugby.
- Peter Wardle – of Christchurch. For services to plant ecology.
- Lydia Joyce Wevers – of Wellington. For services to literature.

Additional

- Major Robert Brian Gillard – Royal New Zealand Engineers.

Honorary

- Bernard Pierre Louis Lapasset – of Paris, France. For services to France–New Zealand relations.
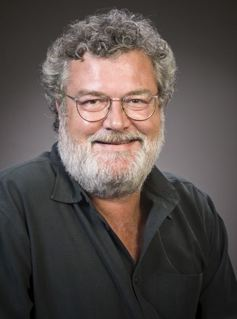
James Belich

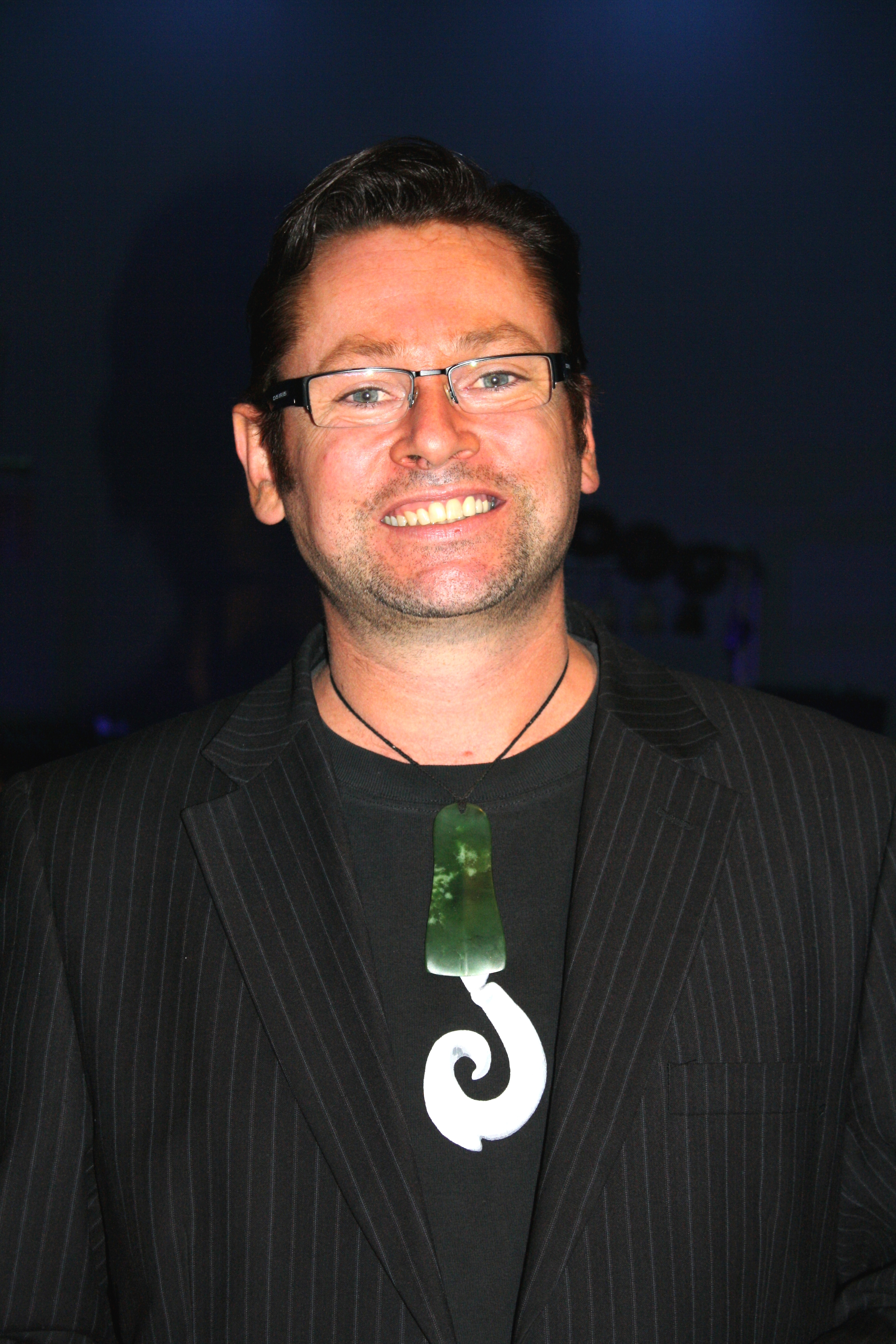
Gareth Farr

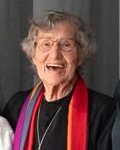
Renée

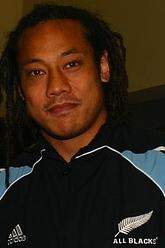
Tana Umaga

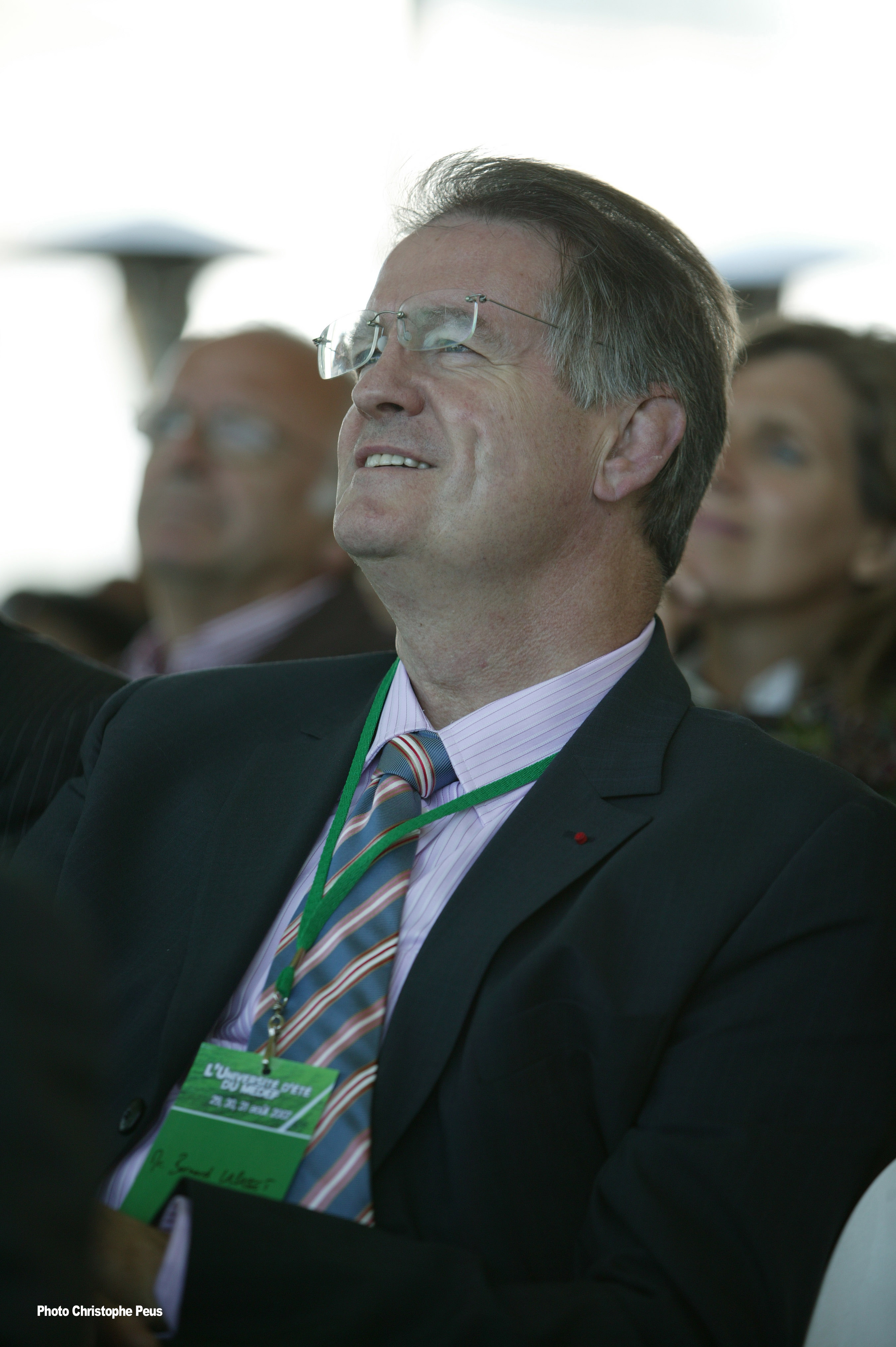
Bernard Lapasset

=== Member (MNZM) ===
- Andrew Ralph Adamson – of Los Angeles, USA. For services to film.
- John Kenneth Ash – of Waitomo Caves. For services to tourism.
- Linda Mary Beck – of Christchurch. For services to people with disabilities.
- Katerina Barbara (Kitty) Bennett – of Wellington. For services to Māori.
- Judith Ann Blair – of Christchurch. For services to netball.
- Alastair Dawson (Sandy) Bull – of Gisborne. For services to conservation.
- Douglas George Caldwell – of Christchurch. For services to jazz music.
- Roderick Collin (Ric) Carlyon JP – of Auckland. For services to broadcasting and the community.
- Garth Alan Carnaby – of Lincoln. For services to the wool industry.
- Peter Coupland Chandler – of Waitomo Caves. For services to tourism.
- Martin Allen Clements – of Christchurch. For services to the fruit industry.
- Gordon Sydney Collier – of Taupō. For services to horticulture.
- Raymond James Cranch – of Auckland. For services to sport, especially rugby league.
- George Leslie Alfred Day – of Manukau City. For services to horticulture.
- Chief Petty Officer Combat System Specialist Alyson Rachel Douglas – Royal New Zealand Navy
- Vera Egermayer – of Prague, Czech Republic. For services to New Zealand interests in the Czech Republic.
- Lieutenant Colonel Justin Scott Emerson – New Zealand Army Legal Service.
- Professor Cynthia Margaret Farquhar – of Auckland. For services to women's health.
- John Paterson Garden – of Roxburgh. For services to science and farming.
- Sara Georgeson – of Wellington. For services to people with disabilities.
- Annie Anitewhatanga Hare JP – of Whakatāne. For services to Māori.
- Jane Elizabeth Harman – of North Shore City. For services to food science and technology.
- Bruce William Hayward – of Auckland. For services to earth science and conservation.
- The Reverend Tevita Kilifi Heimuli QSM JP – of Auckland. For services to the community.
- Colin Duncan Hitchcock – of North Shore City; New Zealand Customs Service. For services to the New Zealand Customs Service and conservation.
- Thomas Elger Inglis – of Motueka. For services to the hop industry.
- Trevor John Cornwall Joy – of Blenheim. For services to civil aviation.
- Leaupepe Elisapeta Karalus JP – of Hamilton. For services to the Pacific Islands community.
- Dex George Knowles – of New Plymouth. For services to resource management.
- Major Robert Shane Krushka – Royal New Zealand Army Logistic Regiment.
- Jane Elizabeth Lancaster – of Christchurch. For services to agricultural and horticultural research.
- Maia Ann Mereana Lewis – of Porirua City. For services to women's cricket.
- Arthur Richard Lockwood – of Palmerston North. For services to returned services personnel.
- Edward Robert (Eddie) Low – of Whangārei. For services to music.
- Sally Ann Markham – of Auckland. For services to the arts.
- Jennie Margaret McCormick – of Manukau City. For services to astronomy.
- Bradley Spencer McGann – of Auckland. For services to the film industry.
- Vivienne Jennifer McLean (née North) – of Dunedin. For services to music.
- Tawera Nikau – of Huntly. For services to rugby league and the community.
- Robin David Odams – of Christchurch. For services to roading.
- Dorothy Joan Pilkington – of Napier. For services to conservation.
- Associate Professor Roger John Pitchforth – of Paraparaumu Beach. For services to dispute resolution.
- Janette Elizabeth Pratt – of Hamilton. For services to education.
- Barry Charles Prior JP – of Hamilton. For services to the community.
- Mervyn Stanley Rosser – of Auckland. For services to tertiary education and the community.
- Gordon Frank Sanderson JP – of Dunedin. For services to people with visual impairments.
- Elizabeth Rae Segedin – of Auckland. For services to children's health.
- Arthur Te Takinga Smallman JP – of Tūrangi. For services to the community.
- Keith Fraser Storey – of Te Awamutu. For services to the dairy industry and the community.
- David Edward Tunnicliffe – of Wellington. For services to Parliament.
- Evelyn Awhina Waaka – of Napier. For services to education.
- Denis Alfred Warren – of Hamilton. For services to returned services personnel and the community.
- Raymond Richard Waru – of Auckland. For services to radio and television.
- Barbara Elizabeth Wheadon – of North Shore City. For services to sport.
- Ian Robert Hugh Whitwell – of Dunedin. For services to conservation.

Additional

- Captain Charles Scott Monteiro (retd) – Royal New Zealand Engineers.
- Staff Sergeant Troy Elliott Perano – New Zealand Special Air Service.
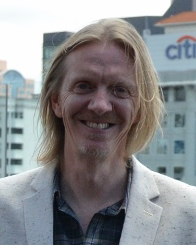
Andrew Adamson

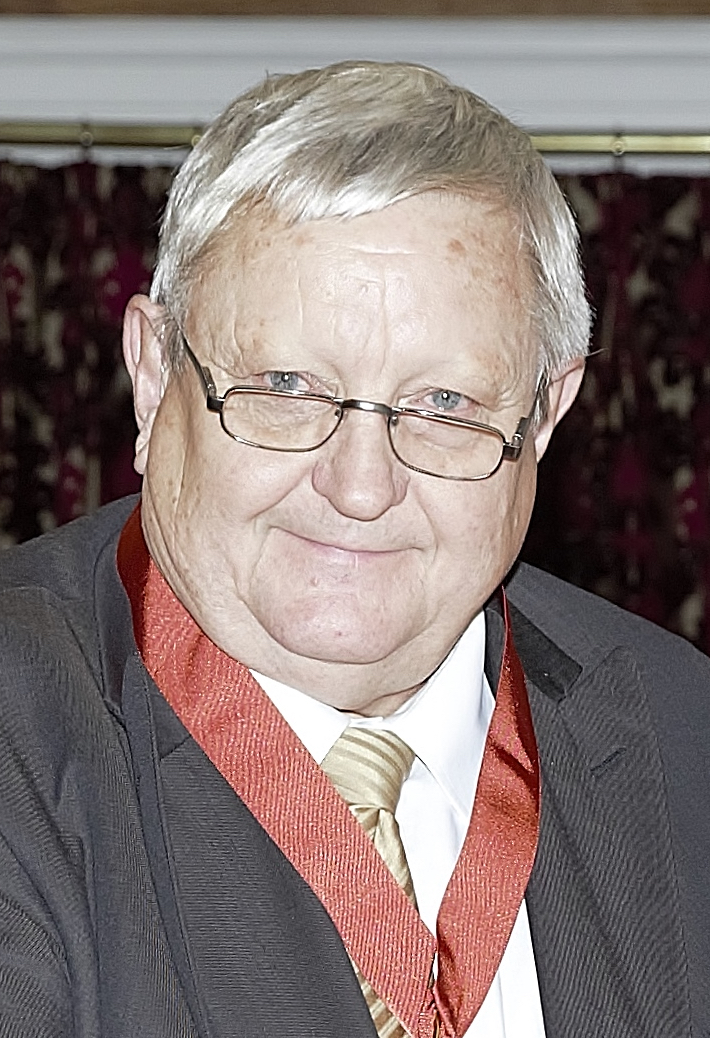
Garth Carnaby

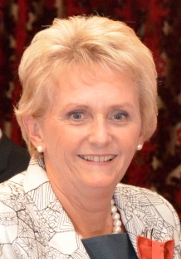
Cindy Farquhar

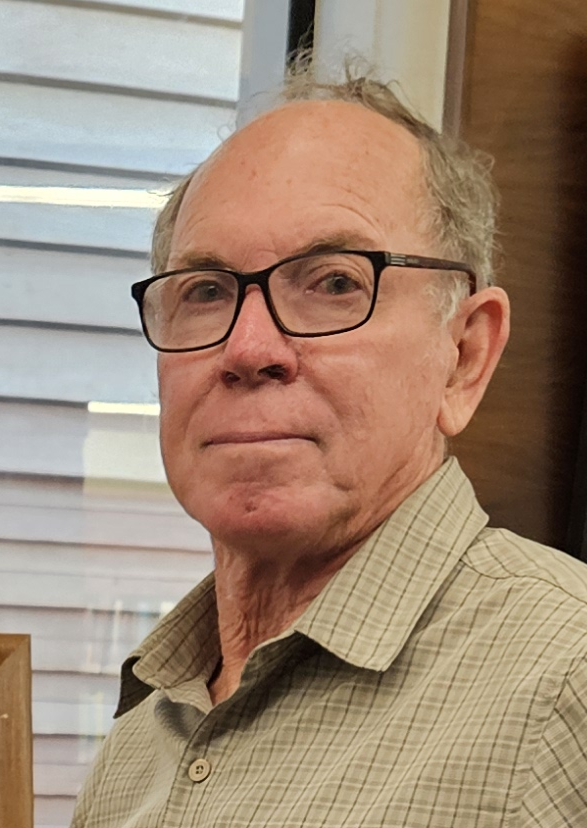
Bruce Hayward

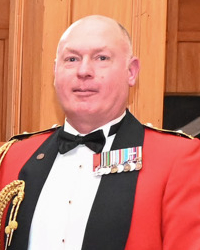
Rob Krushka

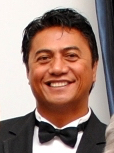
Tawera Nikau

== Companion of the Queen's Service Order (QSO) ==
=== For community service ===
- Judith Anne Tiahuia Abraham – of Whanganui
- John Gordon Armstrong JP – of New Plymouth.
- Mollie McGrade Clark JP – of Christchurch.
- Ishwar Ganda JP – of Christchurch.
- Gloria June Ombler – of Wellington (lately of Dunedin).
- Ailsa Crawford Stewart – of Whanganui.
- The Very Reverend Charles Robert Tyrrell – of Nelson.

=== For public services ===
- Falaniko Iosefo Aukuso – of Apia, Samoa.
- William James Ballantine MBE – of Warkworth.
- David Michael Joseph Barry – of Hastings.
- Alison Joy Dixon – of Dunedin.
- Robin James Dunlop – of Masterton.
- Professor Lynnette Robin Ferguson – of Waitakere (West Auckland).
- Judge Michael Frederick Hobbs JP – of Upper Hutt.
- Stephen Edward Long – of Porirua City.
- Lionel John Wood – of Kaikōura.
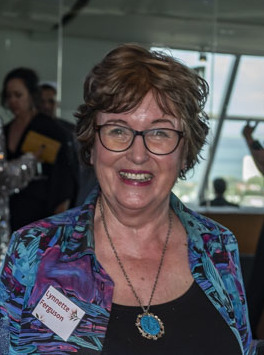
Lynnette Ferguson

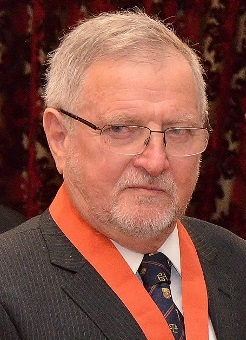
John Wood

== Queen's Service Medal (QSM) ==
=== For community service ===
- Kathleen Marie Barry – of Hastings.
- James Henry Douglas Bond – of Taihape.
- Aileen Lorraine Buchanan – of Taupō.
- William Leicester Buckingham – of Levin.
- Susan Hayward Cathro – of Dunedin.
- John Edward Cunningham JP – of New Plymouth.
- June Perham Douglas – of Ōtorohanga.
- Geoffrey Charles Goodall – of Gisborne.
- Malcolm Arthur Hahn – of Waitakere City.
- Shirley Anne Hazlewood – of Kaponga.
- Brian Edward Henaghan – of Waitakere City.
- Patricia Ellen Greville Henderson Watt – of Whangārei.
- Kay Maree Ingley JP – of Waitakere City.
- Rosemary Jones – of Wellington.
- Mohammed Zabid Iqbal (Javed) Khan – of Auckland.
- Ross Wootten Macdonald – of Whanganui.
- Margaret Ann Mahoney – of Christchurch.
- Yvonne Claire Matson – of Manukau City.
- Leslie William McFadden – of Christchurch.
- Carolina Anne Meikle – of Port Chalmers.
- Henriette Nakhle – of Manukau City.
- Colin Matthew Neil – of Hamilton.
- Valerie Margaret Poszeluk – of Napier.
- Shona Dorothy Purves – of Tauranga.
- Nanu Ranchhod – of Wellington.
- The Reverend Te Wiki Tamaho Rawiri – of the Bay of Islands.
- Horace Victor Shankland – of Warkworth.
- Marlene Alison Rosa Shrubshall JP – of North Shore City.
- Alfred Silberstein – of Auckland.
- Ann Christine Stokes – of Darfield.
- Dinesh Tailor JP – of Auckland.
- Noeline Margaret Tainui – of Hokitika.
- Paeroa Lavinia Wharekauri (Rawinia) Te Kani – of Gisborne.
- Sara Turepu-Murray – of Porirua City.
- Maria Whakatiki Waiwai – of Wairoa.
- Pamela Joan Warren – of Dunedin.
- Pauline Winifred Wilson – of Ashburton.
- Alister George Young ED JP – of Invercargill.
- Fiona Siu Fun Yuen JP – of Auckland.
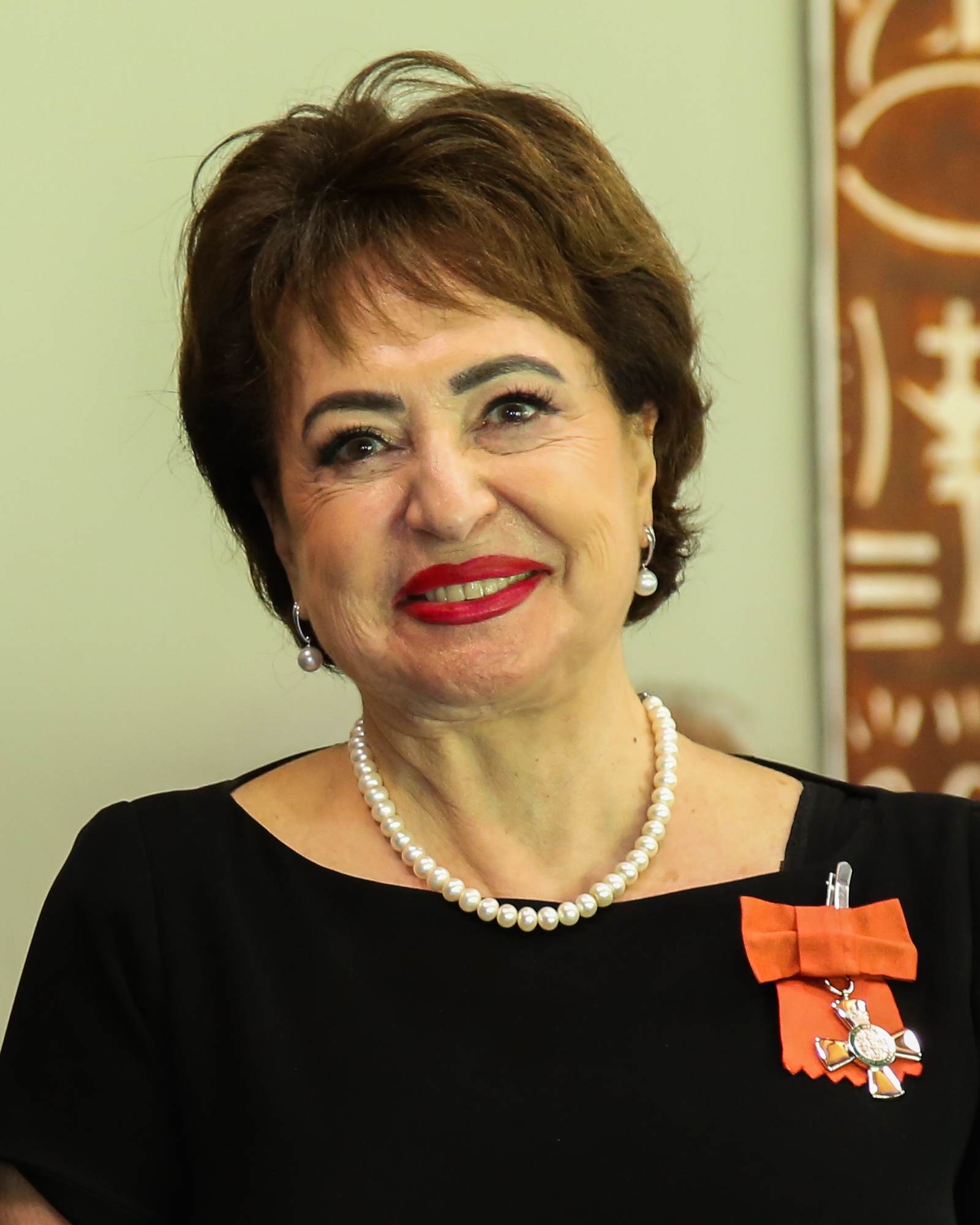
Henriette Nakhle

=== For public services ===
- James Leonard Anderson – of Rotorua; lately chief fire officer, Te Kūiti Volunteer Fire Brigade, New Zealand Fire Service.
- Franciscus Emilius Alfons Rosalia Baetens – of Auckland.
- Hubert David Edward Brooke – of Christchurch.
- Peter Robin Cooke JP – of Christchurch.
- Anne Sandra L'Huillier Corbett – of Drury; New Zealand Police.
- Peter Cotton – of Wellington.
- Luke Mikaire Crawford – of Wellington; sergeant, New Zealand Police.
- David Werner Donaldson – of Rotorua.
- The Reverend John Anthony Elvidge – of Christchurch.
- Alan Jephson Howard Empson – of Te Awamutu.
- Keith Raymond Henderson – of Mataura.
- Brian William Hewett – of Invercargill; detective senior sergeant, New Zealand Police.
- Valarie June Hoogerbrugge JP – of Taupō.
- Michael Lesslie Hucks – of Taupō.
- Claire Elizabeth Hurst – of Hikurangi.
- Dalton Leo Kelly – of Waikanae.
- Peter George Kelly – of Manukau City.
- Marlene Maude Lamb, JP – of Hamilton.
- Lesley William Russell Langdon – of Ashburton.
- Ann Primrose Lewis – of Tākaka.
- Murray Ronald Lints JP – of Whangārei.
- William Harry Albert Lloyd – of Christchurch.
- Murray John Mitchell JP – of Wellington.
- Kihi Ngatai – of Tauranga.
- Mabel Maria Hokimate Ngatai JP – of Tauranga.
- Helen Blanche Haumihiata O'Shea JP – of Great Barrier Island.
- Michael Merton Oxnam – of Porirua City; detective senior sergeant, New Zealand Police.
- Gwenda Alice Pulham – of North Shore City.
- Ivor Moir Reid – of Masterton; lately chief fire officer, Masterton Fire Brigade, New Zealand Fire Service.
- Tihema Hamiora Ripi – of North Shore City.
- John Joseph Thomas Sheahan – of Upper Hutt; lately operational support officer, Silverstream Volunteer Fire Brigade, New Zealand Fire Service.
- James Michael Smith – of Manukau City; chief fire officer, Auckland Volunteer Fire Brigade, New Zealand Fire Service.
- Magdalena Joanna Maria Van Gils – of Auckland.
- Colin Vlietstra – of Lower Hutt; lately inspector, New Zealand Police.
- Gary David Weaver – of Waipukurau; chief fire officer, Waipukurau Volunteer Fire Brigade, New Zealand Fire Service.
- Gillian Anne Williams – of Nelson (lately of Greymouth).
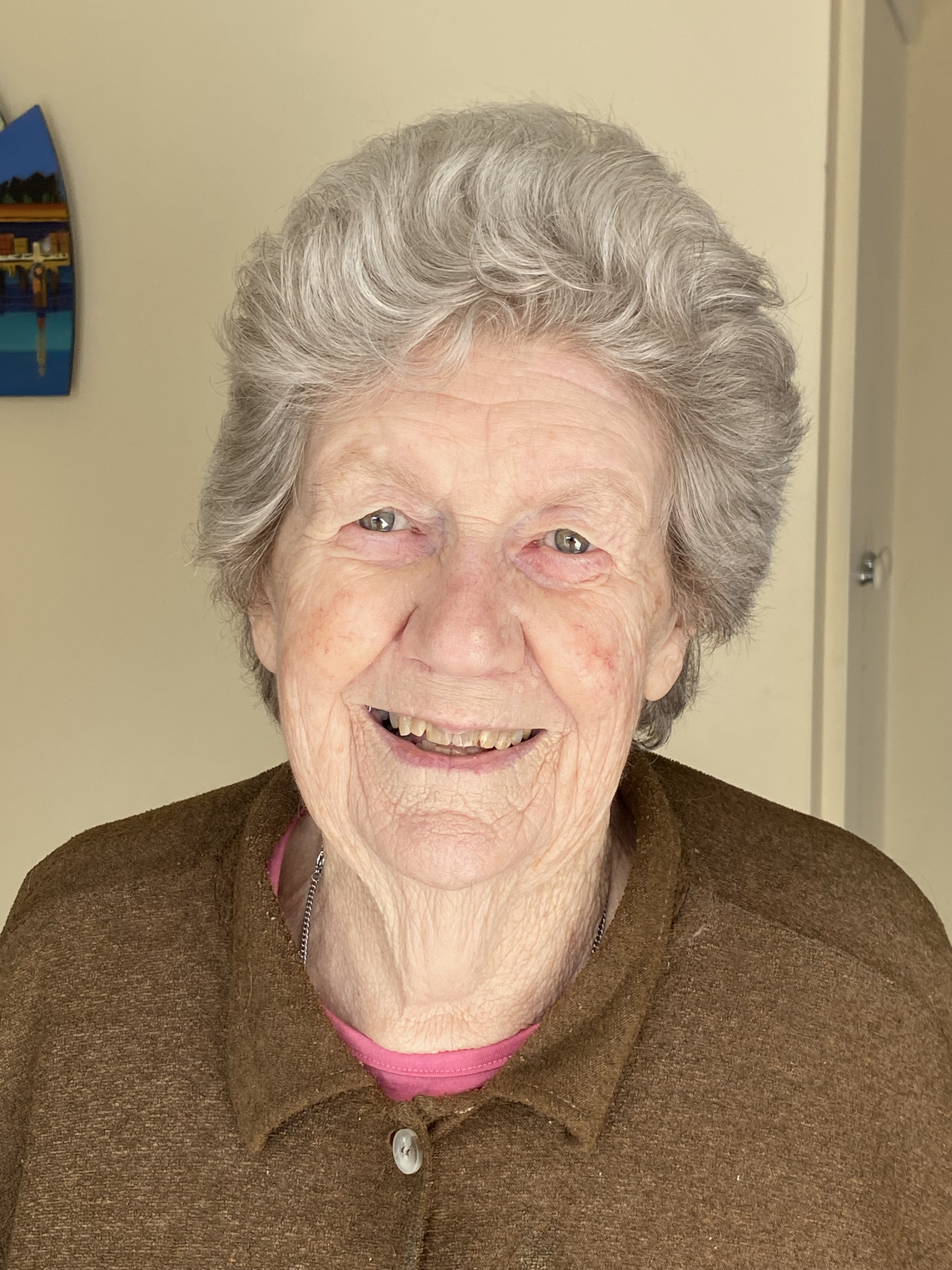
Ann Lewis
