= Peter Cartwright (lawyer) =

New Zealand lawyer (1940–2019)

Peter Cartwright CNZM QSO CStJ
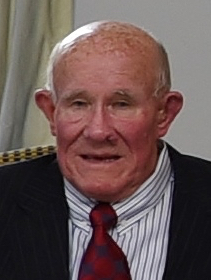
- Cartwright in 2016

Viceregal consort of New Zealand
- In office 4 April 2001 – 4 August 2006
- Preceded by: Mary, Lady Hardie Boys
- Succeeded by: Susan Satyanand

Personal details
- Born: 3 May 1940 Dunedin, New Zealand
- Died: 17 April 2019 (aged 78) Auckland, New Zealand
- Spouse: Silvia Rose Poulter (m. 1969)
- Occupation: Lawyer

Peter John Cartwright CNZM QSO CStJ (3 May 1940 – 17 April 2019) was a New Zealand lawyer and, as the husband of Dame Silvia Cartwright, viceregal consort of New Zealand between 2001 and 2006.

== Early life and career ==
Born in Dunedin on 3 May 1940, Cartwright was the son of James Patrick Cartwright and Gladys Josephine Cartwright (née Laffey). He was educated as a boarder at St Bede's College in Christchurch, and then studied law at the University of Otago from 1960 to 1965, graduating with a Bachelor of Laws. He went on to become a partner in a law firm in Hamilton as a commercial lawyer.

Cartwright served on the boards of IHC New Zealand and the Donald Beasley Institute, and was chair of the latter for several years. He also chaired the Medical Practitioners Disciplinary Tribunal, the Indecent Publications Tribunal and the Broadcasting Standards Authority, was a member of the Accident Compensation Appeal Authority, and patron of Citizen Advocacy Auckland.

== Personal life ==
In 1969, Cartwright married Silvia Rose Poulter who, as Silvia Cartwright, became the first female High Court judge in New Zealand, and who was appointed as the 18th Governor-General of New Zealand in 2001, serving until 2006.

Cartwright died in Auckland on 17 April 2019 at the age of 78.

== Honours ==
In 2001, Cartwright was appointed a Commander of the Order of St John. In the 2006 Queen's Birthday Honours, he was appointed a Companion of the New Zealand Order of Merit, for public services and services to the community, and later that year, at the conclusion of his wife's term as governor-general, he was made a Companion of the Queen's Service Order for community service.
