= Doug Caldwell =

New Zealand jazz pianist and composer (1928–2022)

Doug Caldwell MNZM
- Birth name: Douglas George Caldwell
- Born: 22 March 1928; Christchurch, New Zealand
- Died: 10 May 2022 (aged 94); Christchurch, New Zealand
- Genres: Jazz
- Instruments: Piano

Douglas George Caldwell MNZM (22 March 1928 – 10 May 2022), sometimes referred to as The Maestro, was a New Zealand jazz pianist, arranger, composer, music teacher, and author.

== Biography ==
Caldwell was born in Christchurch, New Zealand in 1928 and attended St Bede's College. He began working at Christchurch venue the Winter Garden in the 1940s and later co-founded a jazz club called the Jazz Inn in the 1950s. He studied musical arrangement and composition at Michigan State University in the United States.

He taught music from 1977 to 1981 at Christchurch Boys' High School and then from 1983 to 1989 at Christ's College. In 1992 he became a tutor, and later lecturer, at the Christchurch Polytechnic Jazz School (now the Ara Institute of Canterbury Jazz School). An auditorium at the school is named for him. He was known as "The Maestro" in Christchurch.

Caldwell became the first New Zealand jazz composer to be given full writer membership to Australasian Performing Right Association (APRA). In the 2006 Queen's Birthday Honours, he was appointed a Member of the New Zealand Order of Merit, for services to jazz music.

Caldwell died in Christchurch on 10 May 2022.

== Discography ==
- The Doug Caldwell Trio (Kiwi Pacific,1990)
- Off the Cuff (Kiwi Pacific, 1992)
- Willows – Doug Caldwell live (Polyjazz, 1995)
- Legacy (Polyjazz, 2003)
- I Hear Music – with Susan de Jong (Polyjazz, 2005)
- Waiting at the Red Door (Polyjazz, 2009)
- Colette Jansen Meets Doug Caldwell (Colette Jansen, 2013)

Guest artist:

- Don Rader Down Under 'Collaboration' – (Polyjazz, 1994)
