= Noel Robinson (businessman) =

New Zealand businessman and philanthropist

Sir Noel Robinson KNZM
- Born: Noel Stuart Robinson; 28 December 1943 (age 82); Remuera, New Zealand
- Education: St Peter's School, Cambridge; Saint Kentigern College
- Occupation: Businessman
- Known for: Founder of Robinson Industries; Development of Paraparaumu Airport; Philanthropy
- Relatives: Woolf Fisher (uncle); Gus Fisher (uncle)

Sir Noel Stuart Robinson KNZM (born 28 December 1943) is a New Zealand businessman and philanthropist.

== Early life and family ==
Robinson was born in the Auckland suburb of Remuera on 28 December 1943, the son of Percy Robinson and Florence Robinson (née Fisher). He was educated at St Peter's School, Cambridge, from 1953 to 1957, and Saint Kentigern College in Auckland between 1958 and 1961. Upon leaving school, he became an engineering cadet at Fisher & Paykel, the appliance manufacturing company co-founded in 1934 by his uncle, Woolf Fisher, and rose to become factory manager at East Tāmaki.

== Business activities ==
In 1970, Robinson established his own company, Robinson Industries, manufacturing and marketing home appliances including range hoods, washing tubs and ironing centres. He retired from his roles as managing director and company chair and sold the company in 1999.

Robinson was also active in property development, particularly the Highbrook Industrial Estate and Paraparaumu Airport. He led the purchase of the airport in 2006, developing it and the neighbouring business park, and the name of the airport was changed to Kapiti Coast Airport in 2011. Air New Zealand began regional services from the airport in 2011, but ceased operations there at short notice in 2018 in a decision of which Robinson was highly critical.

In the 1990s, Robinson was a director and for a time deputy chair of South Auckland Health, which later became the Counties Manukau District Health Board.

== Philanthropy ==
After retiring from business, Robinson became involved in philanthropic activities, primarily in the South Auckland area. In 2000, he was the founding chair of Second Nature Charitable Trust, which established the Vodafone Events Centre, Vector Wero Whitewater Park, and Momentum Hub (a youth leadership and social innovation centre) in Manukau. He stepped down from the board of trustees in 2020, and is now the organisation's patron.

Robinson is also chair of the Sir Woolf Fisher Charitable Trust, a trustee of the John Walker Find Your Field of Dreams Foundation, and patron of the Manukau Symphony Orchestra.

== Honours and awards ==
In the 2006 Queen's Birthday Honours, Robinson was appointed a Distinguished Companion of the New Zealand Order of Merit, for services to business and the community. Following the restoration of titular honours by the New Zealand government in 2009, he accepted redesignation as a Knight Companion of the New Zealand Order of Merit.

In 2006, Robinson was inducted into the Manukau Business Hall of Fame, and in 2019 he was added to the New Zealand Business Hall of Fame.
