= David Barry (New Zealand paediatrician) =

New Zealand paediatrician (born 1939)

David Barry QSO
- Born: David Michael Joseph Barry; 3 April 1939 (age 87); Auckland, New Zealand
- Education: University of Otago
- Occupation: Paediatrician
- Spouse: Kathleen Joyce Gardner (m. 1966)
- Children: 3

David Michael Joseph Barry QSO (born 3 April 1939) is a New Zealand paediatrician. Employed by the Hawke's Bay District Health Board and its predecessors from 1972 to 2006, Barry was the first paediatrician at Hawke's Bay Hospital, and has been called the "father of paediatrics" in Hawke's Bay.

== Early life and family ==
Barry was born in Auckland on 3 April 1939, the son of Esther Barry (née Hunia) and Thomas John Allan Barry. He was educated at St Michael's Convent in Remuera, and then St Peter's College from 1950 to 1956. He went on to study medicine at the University of Otago, graduating MB ChB in 1963, and earned a Postgraduate Diploma in Child Health (DCH) in London in 1968.

In Dunedin on 15 September 1966, Barry married Kathleen Joyce Gardner, a radiographer, and the couple went on to have three children.

== Career ==
Barry's early career was at Napier Hospital from 1964 to 1966. He gained overseas experience, working at various hospitals in London from 1967 to 1970, before returning to New Zealand to a position as senior paediatrics registrar at Waikato Hospital in 1971. The following year, he joined Hawke's Bay Hospital in 1972 as the hospital's first paediatrician.

He is a member of the Asthma and Respiratory Foundation of New Zealand and was a member of the Medical Advisory Panel from 1985. He is also a member of the Hawke's Bay Asthma Society, including time as president.

Barry was involved in developing the Child Asthma Plan for the Respiratory Foundation and worked on epidemiological studies such as the International Study of Asthma and Allergies in Childhood (ISAAC). He is a member of the Respiratory Committee of the Paediatric Society of New Zealand and made contributions to the Paediatric Asthma Guidelines Group and his research interests include exercise-induced asthma in children.

== Honours and awards ==
In 1990, Barry received the New Zealand 1990 Commemoration Medal. In the 2006 Queen's Birthday Honours, he was appointed a Companion of the Queen's Service Order for public services.

Barry is a fellow of both the Royal College of Physicians and the Royal Australasian College of Physicians.
