= Kihi Ngatai =

New Zealand Māori leader (1930–2021)

Kihi Ngatai QSM (3 July 1930 – 1 August 2021) was a New Zealand Māori leader. He served as a member of the Waitangi Tribunal.

In the 2006 Queen's Birthday Honours, Ngatai received the Queen's Service Medal for public services.
