= Falani Aukuso =

Tokelauan politician

Falani Aukuso QSO
- Born: September 1948
- Died: 31 July 2008 (aged 59); Suva, Fiji
- Occupations: Administrator, diplomat

Falaniko "Falani" Iosefo Aukuso QSO (September 1948 – 31 July 2008) was the deputy director general of the Secretariat of the Pacific Community.

Aukuso was a native of Tokelau. He served as the Tokelauan director of education. He later worked as a diplomatic officer with the New Zealand Ministry of External Relations and Trade from 1990 to 1994. He returned to Tokelau where he was the director of the Office of the Council of Faipule, which is the island country's Cabinet, from 1994 to 2004. Aukuso then became the general manager of the National Office of the Government of Tokelau in May 2004. Aukuso next became the deputy director general of the Secretariat of the Pacific Community on 1 July 2006, a position he held until his death.

In the 2006 Queen's Birthday Honours, Aukuso was appointed a Companion of the Queen's Service Order for public services.

He died suddenly at his home in Suva, Fiji, on 31 July 2008. His death was announced at the closing ceremonies of the 10th Festival of Pacific Arts at Veterans Stadium in Tafuna, American Samoa. His death was later found to be a suicide.
