= Silvia Cartwright =

Governor-General of New Zealand from 2001 to 2006

The Honourable Dame Silvia Cartwright ONZ PCNZM DBE QSO DStJ
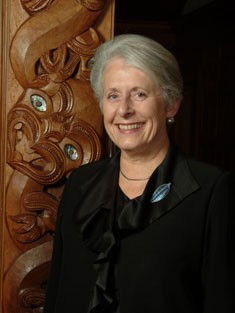

18th Governor-General of New Zealand
- In office 4 April 2001 – 4 August 2006
- Monarch: Elizabeth II
- Prime Minister: Helen Clark
- Preceded by: Sir Michael Hardie Boys
- Succeeded by: Sir Anand Satyanand

3rd Chief District Court judge
- In office 1989–1993
- Preceded by: Peter Trapski
- Succeeded by: Ron Young

Personal details
- Born: Silvia Rose Poulter; 7 November 1943 (age 83) Dunedin, New Zealand
- Spouse: Peter Cartwright (m. 1969; died 2019)
- Education: University of Otago

Dame Silvia Rose Cartwright ONZ PCNZM DBE QSO DStJ (née Poulter; born 7 November 1943) is a New Zealand jurist who served as the 18th governor-general of New Zealand, from 2001 to 2006. She was the second woman to hold the office, after Dame Catherine Tizard.

== Early life ==
Cartwright is a former student at Otago Girls' High School, and is a graduate of the University of Otago, where she gained her Bachelor of Laws degree in 1967.

== Public life ==
=== Legal career ===
In 1989, Cartwright became the first female Chief District Court Judge, and in 1993 she was the first woman to be appointed to the High Court.

Cartwright presided over a 1988 inquiry into issues related to cervical cancer and its treatment at Auckland's National Women's Hospital, known as the Cartwright Inquiry. Cartwright has previously served on the Committee on the Elimination of Discrimination against Women, and played a major role in the drafting of the Optional Protocol to the Convention on the Elimination of All Forms of Discrimination against Women.

In 2007, in recognition for Cartwright's work as a lawyer, the Auckland Women Lawyers' Association established a lecture known as the Dame Silvia Cartwright Lecture Series.

=== Governor-General of New Zealand ===
Cartwright's term as Governor-General of New Zealand was from 4 April 2001 to 4 August 2006. She was succeeded by Anand Satyanand at midday on 23 August 2006. During the intervening period, Chief Justice Dame Sian Elias was the Administrator of the Government (acting governor-general).

On 16 June 2002, Cartwright made a speech at the Annual General Meeting of Save The Children's New Zealand branch, in which she criticised section 59 of the Crimes Act 1961, which allowed parents to use "reasonable force" to discipline their children. A number of groups criticised this position, such as the Society for the Promotion of Community Standards – the Monarchist League stated that these comments were "overstepping the mark" for a representative of the Queen, while Green Party MP Sue Bradford welcomed the comments.

On 12 August 2002, in a speech at the opening of the Specialised Applied Research Centre of the Victoria University of Wellington, Cartwright questioned whether longer sentences would reduce criminal reoffending rates. This was after the Sentencing Act 2002 and the Parole Act 2002 were passed – Acts for which Cartwright granted Royal Assent on 12 July 2002. The Acts introduced mandatory sentences for criminal convictions, and reduced the likelihood of parole. ACT New Zealand MP Stephen Franks was critical of the remarks, stating "I don't think she was regarded as one of the most weighty judges and she's putting herself into a difficult constitutional position by weighing in this area", as was the Sensible Sentencing Trust. However, Prime Minister Helen Clark defended the governor-general, stating "One of the challenges for us is we clearly are no longer a dominion of Britain where the Governor-General is exactly like the Queen".

On Waitangi Day 2004, following National leader Don Brash's controversial Orewa Speech on race relations, Cartwright controversially gave a different interpretation of the phrase "He iwi tahi tatou".

Following the 2005 general election, former National deputy leader Gerry Brownlee stated that Cartwright had not allowed National the chance at forming a government. Brownlee said "I have to publicly say that I have lost respect for the Governor-General and I think it is time we sat down now and started to look at a much more formal constitution for New Zealand". In response, Helen Clark said that the governor-general followed a "very, very proper process".

=== Cambodian War Crimes Tribunal ===
Cartwright was appointed to sit as one of two international judges in the Trial Chamber of the Cambodia Tribunal by Cambodia's Supreme Council of Magistracy. Multiple Defence requests that she stand down from this position have been consistently rejected by both the Trial Chamber and Supreme Court Chambers on their merits.

== Honours and awards ==
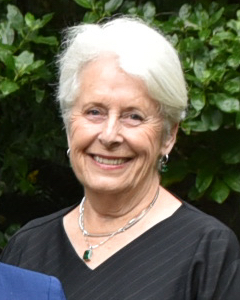
Cartwright in December 2020

In the 1989 Queen's Birthday Honours, Cartwright was appointed a Dame Commander of the Order of the British Empire, for services to women. Upon her retirement from the High Court, she was granted the use of the style "The Honourable" for life. In 1990, Cartwright received the New Zealand 1990 Commemoration Medal, and in 1993 she was awarded the New Zealand Suffrage Centennial Medal. She was made a Principal Companion of the New Zealand Order of Merit in 2001, and she was awarded the Queen's Service Order at the State luncheon at Parliament to farewell her on 2 August 2006.

In the 2022 Queen's Birthday and Platinum Jubilee Honours, Cartwright was appointed an additional Member of the Order of New Zealand, for services to New Zealand.

Cartwright is an Honorary Member of The International Raoul Wallenberg Foundation and a fellow of the Hastings Center, a bioethics research institution in the United States.

== Styles ==
- Her Honour Judge Silvia Rose Cartwright (1987–1989)
- Her Honour Chief Judge Dame Silvia Rose Cartwright DBE (1989–1993)
- The Hon. Justice Dame Silvia Rose Cartwright DBE (1993–2001)
- The Hon. Justice Dame Silvia Rose Cartwright PCNZM DBE (2001)
- Her Excellency The Hon. Dame Silvia Rose Cartwright PCNZM DBE, Governor-General of New Zealand (2001–2006)
- Her Excellency The Hon. Dame Silvia Rose Cartwright PCNZM DBE QSO, Governor-General of New Zealand (2006)
- The Hon. Dame Silvia Rose Cartwright PCNZM DBE QSO (2006–2022)
- The Hon. Dame Silvia Rose Cartwright ONZ PCNZM DBE QSO (since 2022)

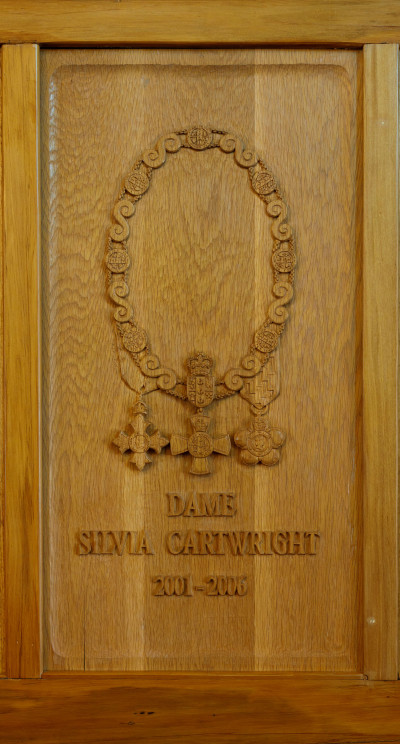
A carved panel depicting the honours of Dame Silvia Cartwright, displayed in the main entrance hall of Government House in Wellington

== Personal life ==
In 1969, Cartwright married lawyer Peter John Cartwright. He died on 17 April 2019.

Government offices
Preceded by Sir Michael Hardie Boys	Governor-General of New Zealand; 2001–2006	Succeeded by Sir Anand Satyanand
