= Zurella =

New Zealand-bred Thoroughbred racehorse

- Sire: Zabeel
- Grandsire: Sir Tristram
- Dam: Doneze Girl
- Damsire: Miss Trump
- Sex: Mare
- Foaled: 25 September 2008
- Country: New Zealand
- Colour: Bay
- Breeder: Karreman Bloodstock Ltd
- Owner: The Oaks Stud
- Trainer: Shaune Ritchie
- Record: 9: 5-2-0
- Earnings: $279,837

Zurella is a Thoroughbred mare trained in New Zealand by Shaune Ritchie. She is winner of the 2012 Let's Elope Stakes, and finished second in the 2012 New Zealand Oaks.
