= Peter Wardle =

New Zealand botanist (1931–2008)

Peter Wardle ONZM FRSNZ
- Born: 14 February 1931
- Died: 6 December 2008 (aged 77)
- Education: University of Cambridge
- Known for: New Zealand botany
- Scientific career
- Thesis: (1957)
- Doctoral advisor: Alexander Stuart Watt

Peter Wardle ONZM FRSNZ (14 February 1931 – 6 December 2008) was a New Zealand botanist.

== Academic career ==
Raised largely in the town of Lake Hāwea in Central Otago, Wardle attended Waitaki Boys' High School and then the University of Otago, where he obtained an MSc with first class honours on the vegetation and climate of the Dunedin region, graduating in 1954. He won a scholarship to University of Cambridge and completed a PhD under Alexander Stuart Watt. He returned to New Zealand to work at the Forest Service before being recruited by Eric Godley for the Botany Division of the Department of Scientific and Industrial Research. His scientific strength remained the botany and ecology of the lower South Island, where he had been raised.

He was elected a Fellow of the Royal Society of New Zealand in 1977 and awarded the society's Hector Medal in 1990. In the 2006 Queen's Birthday Honours, Wardle was appointed an Officer of the New Zealand Order of Merit, for services to plant ecology.

He died on 6 December 2008 while crossing the Waimakariri River.

== Selected works ==
- Vegetation of New Zealand (1991)
- Scenic reserves of South Westland: a botanical survey of scenic and allied reserves of South Westland (1980)
- Plants and landscape in Westland National Park (1979)
