= Arthur Stubbs =

New Zealand war veteran

- Born: 18 May 1904; Oamaru, New Zealand
- Died: 15 September 2008 (aged 104); Tauranga, New Zealand
- Military career
- Allegiance: New Zealand
- Branch: Army
- Service years: 1940–1945
- Rank: Corporal
- Units: 2nd NZ Division, Divisional Petrol Company
- Conflicts: Battle of Crete
- Other work: Farmer, Motor Mechanic

Arthur Gordon Stubbs (18 May 1904 – 15 September 2008) was, at the time of his death, New Zealand's oldest war veteran. He was 104. Stubbs signed up for active service during World War II despite being too old to serve and having lied about his age (He was 36). He fought in the Battle of Crete where he was taken prisoner by the German army and spent almost four years in captivity before escaping.
