= Anand Satyanand =

Governor General of New Zealand from 2006 to 2011

The Right Honourable Sir Anand Satyanand GNZM QSO KStJ
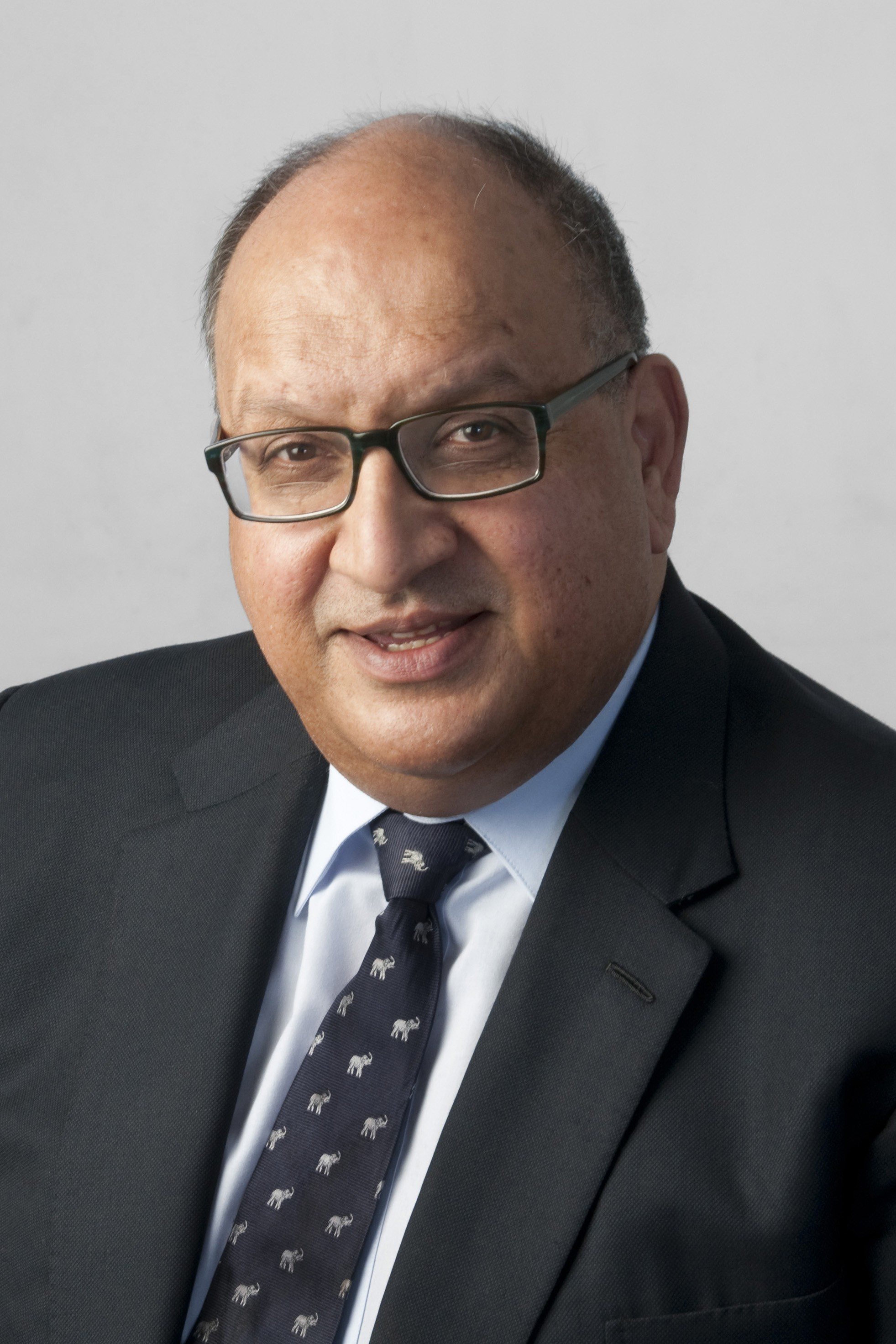
- Satyanand in 2006

12th Chancellor of the University of Waikato
- In office 6 August 2019 – 1 July 2025
- Preceded by: Jim Bolger
- Succeeded by: Susan Hassall

19th Governor-General of New Zealand
- In office 23 August 2006 – 23 August 2011
- Monarch: Elizabeth II
- Prime Minister: Helen Clark; John Key
- Preceded by: Dame Silvia Cartwright
- Succeeded by: Sir Jerry Mateparae

Personal details
- Born: 22 July 1944 (age 82) Auckland, New Zealand
- Spouse: Susan Sharpe, Lady Satyanand (m. 1970)
- Education: University of Auckland
- Profession: Lawyer, judge, ombudsman

Sir Anand Satyanand GNZM QSO KStJ (born 22 July 1944) is a New Zealand lawyer, judge, and ombudsman who served as the 19th Governor-General of New Zealand from 2006 to 2011.

Satyanand was the Chair of the Commonwealth Foundation for two 2-year terms, ending in December 2016. He then chaired the Commonwealth Group which observed the national elections in Papua New Guinea in 2017. In 2018, the New Zealand Government appointed him to lead the Royal Commission of Inquiry into Historical Abuse in State care and in the care of Faith-based Institutions. In November 2019, at the conclusion of its build-up phase, he stepped down as Chair of the Commission. He served as Chancellor of the University of Waikato from August 2019 until July 2025.

== Early life and family ==
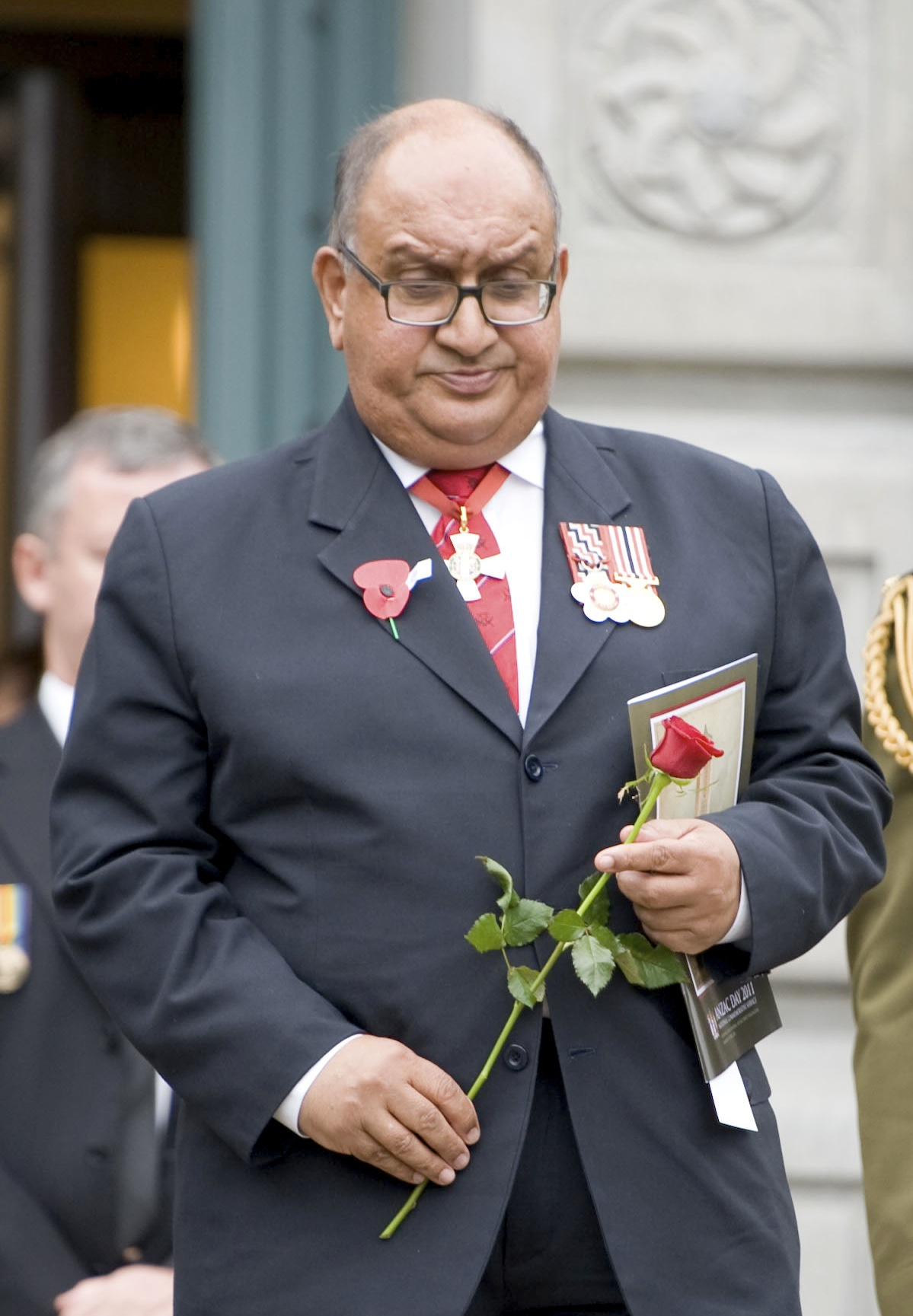
Satyanand putting flowers on the Tomb of the Unknown Warrior, April 2011

Anand Satyanand was born on 22 July 1944 and raised in Auckland to Indo-Fijian parents. Both of his parents were born in Fiji and all four of his grandparents came from India, originating from the states of Andhra Pradesh, Bihar and Uttar Pradesh. His maternal grandfather, Tilakdas, left a small village near Shahjahanpur in Uttar Pradesh, aged 6 years, and travelled to Kolkata (formerly known as Calcutta) where his father, uncle and grandfather were indentured as labourers, and sailed for Fiji with them in 1882. In 1897, Tilakdas married Sumintra, the daughter of another girmitiya family. Their daughter Taramati (Satyanand’s mother) was born in 1918 in Suva.

Satyanand's paternal grandparents, originally from Rajahmundry in Andhra Pradesh (located in the state's East Godavari district), sailed from Chennai (formerly known as Madras) in 1911. Their son, Mutyala Satyanand, was born in Sigatoka in 1913, while his father worked as a government interpreter. Mutyala Satyanand arrived in New Zealand in 1927 on a Fiji Government scholarship to attend Wanganui Technical College and later the University of Otago in Dunedin. He completed his Bachelor of Surgery and Bachelor of Medicine degrees in 1938 — the first Indian to graduate with a medical degree in New Zealand. In the same year, Satyanand’s mother Tara Tillak, arrived in New Zealand to train as a Karitane nurse in New Zealand. She married Mutyala Satyanand in 1939. Anand was born in 1944 and their second son, Vijay Satyanand, was born in 1949.

== Education and early career ==
Satyanand attended Sacred Heart College in Auckland, and then undertook the medical intermediate course at the University of Otago in Dunedin. He was not successful in gaining entry to the medical school. Instead he turned to law studies, working part-time as a law clerk in Auckland. He worked at Westfield Freezing Works to help fund his studies, with his friend David Lange He graduated with a Bachelor of Laws from the University of Auckland in 1970. He worked as a lawyer for the next 12 years, some of that with the Crown Solicitor's firm and then as a Partner with the legal firm Shieff Angland. His legal work centred on criminal law and revenue law. He served on the Council of the Auckland District Law Society from 1979 until his appointment as a Judge of the District Court of New Zealand in 1982.

During the 1966 general election, Satyanand helped Clive Edwards (later Tongan Deputy Prime Minister) when he stood in Auckland Central for National. Later, in the 1975 general election, Anand and Susan helped David Lange in his first, unsuccessful attempt at election (for Labour, in the seat of Hobson).

During his 12 years as a District Court Judge, Satyanand helped to develop professional education programmes for judges, and served as a Chair of the Napier Prison Board and then Deputy Chair of the National Parole Board. He maintained special interests in criminal justice and law reform. In 1995 Satyanand was appointed as a Parliamentary Ombudsman, and he served two 5-year terms. Between 2005 and his appointment as governor-general he chaired the Confidential Forum for Former In-Patients of Psychiatric Hospitals, reviewed the Banking Ombudsman scheme, and installed the Pecuniary Interests Register and Scheme for Members of Parliament. In 2006, he was granted an Honorary Doctor of Laws by the University of Auckland.

== Personal life ==
While he was a law clerk, Anand met a legal executive, Susan Sharpe, who was born in Sydney, Australia in 1947. They were married in 1970 and over the next 10 years, had three children: Tara, Anya and Rohan, who in turn have produced five grandchildren: Joshua, Lola, Leilani, Tomás and Diego. Their son Rohan was married in 2010, and their Anya had a civil union in 2012. In 2002, Anand and Susan were involved in a serious car accident in Dome Valley north of Warkworth, Northland, where an oncoming car crossed the centre-line and crashed head-on into their car. Both were injured, and Satyanand suffered serious spinal injury; he broke his C2 and C3 vertebrae, and had to wear a halo traction to keep his head straight.

English is Satyanand's first language, but he also has some understanding of Fijian, Māori, Telugu (his Indian-origin heritage language) and Fiji Hindi (the lingua franca of his Indo-Fijian ethnic community).

== Governor-General of New Zealand ==
In 2006, Satyanand was appointed Governor-General by Queen Elizabeth II on the advice of the New Zealand government under Prime Minister Helen Clark. He succeeded Dame Silvia Cartwright as governor-general on 23 August 2006. His appointment was welcomed by every parliamentary party leader. He was the first governor-general of Indian descent (as well as non-white and non-Maori cum Asian-origin) and the first Roman Catholic governor-general.

Prince Richard, Duke of Gloucester, Grand Prior of the Order of St John, received Satyanand as governor-general designate on 7 July 2006 and invested him as a Knight of Justice of the Most Venerable Order of the Hospital of St John of Jerusalem.

In May 2007 changes were made to the Queen's Service Order, which meant that the governor-general could be appointed a Companion of the Order in their own right, rather than as ex-officio Principal Companion but not a Member of the Order.

The first bill to which Satyanand granted Royal Assent was the Coroners Bill.

Starting on New Year's Day 2009, Satyanand issued a "New Year's Message" intended to highlight "issues New Zealanders might consider as they looked to the future".

Satyanand was the first governor-general not to hold a knighthood before entering office (Colonel Thomas Gore Browne, Governor of New Zealand 1855–1861, was knighted in office). However, following the changes to the New Zealand honours system announced by Prime Minister John Key on 8 March 2009, the Queen approved Satyanand's redesignation from a Principal Companion in the New Zealand Order of Merit (PCNZM) to a Knight Grand Companion of that Order (GNZM) on 27 March 2009.

On assuming the role of governor-general, Satyanand received the style The Honourable for life; in 2010, he was advanced to the style of The Right Honourable. This style was accorded for life to all future governors-general, prime ministers, chief justices, and Speakers of Parliament.

Satyanand completed his term of office as governor-general on 23 August 2011.

The New Zealand Government pays for the costs associated with the Queen's representative, the governor-general, in their exercising of the powers of the Crown on behalf of the Queen, including travel, security, residences, offices, and ceremonial occasions. In 2010, these costs were reported publicly for the first time. In the 2010 Budget, the total cost of supporting the governor-general was $3,591,000 for Support Services and Maintenance of the residences, $1,710,000 for Depreciation on Government Houses, $1,279,000 Remuneration and Travel and an estimated $1,680,000 for Policy Advice and Co-ordination; a total of $7,610,000 and $11 million on capital investment in Government House, Wellington, entailing significant renovation and conservation which had been overdue for many years, and totaled more than $18 million. During the 3 years of construction, the Satyanands did not live in the residence.

On 30 November 2006, Satyanand hosted a meeting between the Prime Minister of Fiji, Laisenia Qarase, and Fiji's military commander, Commodore Frank Bainimarama, at Government House in Wellington in the context of an escalating crisis in Fiji. The discussions between Qarase and Bainimarama were chaired by New Zealand's then Foreign Minister, Winston Peters. This was the last serious effort by the international community to avert a military coup, which followed on 5 December.

At the opening of a new train station in New Lynn, in Auckland in 2010, Satyanand stated that heavy investment in motorways and the decline of public transport after trams were taken off the roads in the 1950s had led to severe congestion to the detriment of both individuals and the economy.

On 5 October 2010, a host of TVNZ's Breakfast show, Paul Henry questioned whether Satyanand was "even a New Zealander". He then repeated the question, asking the Prime Minister about how he would select Satyanand's replacement, "Are you going to choose a New Zealander who looks and sounds like a New Zealander this time ... are we going to go for someone who is more like a New Zealander this time?" Henry attracted criticism from both sides of politics and New Zealand's race relations conciliator Joris de Bres. Henry later apologised, was suspended, and then resigned from TVNZ.

== Subsequent roles ==
In 2011, the President of India awarded Satyanand the Pravasi Bharatiya Samman, the Indian government’s highest award for Indians living overseas, for outstanding achievements in public life. In the same year, the King of Tonga made him a member of the Royal Order of the Crown of Tonga (Fakalangilangi 'o Kalauni 'o Tonga).

After concluding his term as governor general, Anand spent some time living in Sydney with Lady Susan, before returning to Wellington, where they still live. Satyanand was Chair of the Commonwealth Foundation for two 2-year terms, ending in December 2016. He then led the Royal Commission of Inquiry into Historical Abuse in State care and in the care of Faith-based Institutions, over an 18-month period, during its establishment, after which he handed over his role as Chair to Judge Coral Shaw. He served as Chancellor of the University of Waikato for 6 years from August 2019 until July 2025.

Satyanand has maintained active interests in several organisations, including as President and now Patron of the NZ Institute of International Affairs, as a member of Transparency International's Anti-Corruption Council and as Patron of New Zealand Rugby League, Wellington Jazz Club, Friends of Fiji Health, and of Commonwealth Youth New Zealand. He is a Distinguished Fellow at the University of Auckland Law School. Susan and Anand are both active members of the Rotary Club of Wellington; both have been made Paul Harris Fellows, and Satyanand received the Rotary International Award of Honour in 2011.

== Styles and honours ==
- His Honour Judge Anand Satyanand (1982 – 5 June 2005)
- His Honour Judge Anand Satyanand, DCNZM (6 June 2005 – 4 June 2006)
- His Honour Judge Anand Satyanand, PCNZM (5 June 2006 – 22 August 2006)
- His Excellency The Honourable Anand Satyanand, PCNZM, Governor-General of New Zealand (23 August 2006 – 20 May 2007)
- His Excellency The Honourable Anand Satyanand, PCNZM, QSO, Governor-General of New Zealand (21 May 2007 – 26 March 2009)
- His Excellency The Honourable Sir Anand Satyanand, GNZM, QSO, Governor-General of New Zealand (27 March 2009 – 2 August 2010)
- His Excellency The Right Honourable Sir Anand Satyanand, GNZM, QSO, Governor-General of New Zealand (3 August 2010 – 23 August 2011)
- The Right Honourable Sir Anand Satyanand, GNZM, QSO (24 August 2011 – Present)

=== Coat of arms ===
Coat of arms of Sir Anand Satyanand
Notes Anand Satyanand was granted armorial bearings with life supporters by the College of Arms on 6 January 2011, which consist of: Crest Upon a Helm with a Wreath Or and Gules a North Island Brown Kiwi (Apteryx australis mantelli) supporting a Mace representing that of the New Zealand House of Representatives palewise Or and between the Mace and Kiwi a Barrister’s Wig proper. Escutcheon Gules a White Fronted Tern or Tara (Sterna striata) volant proper between three Trumpet Shells (Charonia tritonis) palewise and in centre chief a Pair of Scales Or. Supporters On either side an Indian Elephant Sable about its neck a Wreath of Karaka (Corynocarpus laevigatus) Vert fructed with orange drupes proper. Motto Through truth comes joy

Government offices
Preceded by Dame Silvia Cartwright	Governor-General of New Zealand; 2006–2011	Succeeded by Sir Jerry Mateparae
