= Guy Powles =

New Zealand diplomat (1905–1994)

Sir Guy Powles ONZ KBE CMG ED

1st New Zealand Chief Ombudsman
- In office 1962–1977
- Succeeded by: George Laking

New Zealand High Commissioner to India
- In office 1960–1962
- Preceded by: Bill Challis
- Succeeded by: Fred de Malmanche

High Commissioner of Western Samoa
- In office 1949–1960
- Preceded by: Francis William Voelcker
- Succeeded by: Jack Wright

Personal details
- Born: Guy Richardson Powles; 5 April 1905 Ōtaki, New Zealand
- Died: 24 October 1994 (aged 89) Wellington, New Zealand
- Relatives: Charles Guy Powles (father); Michael Powles (son); Tim Powles (grandson)
- Education: LLB, LLD; Victoria University College
- Profession: Barrister

Sir Guy Richardson Powles ONZ KBE CMG ED (5 April 1905 – 24 October 1994) was a New Zealand diplomat, the last governor of Western Samoa and architect of Samoan independence, and New Zealand's first ombudsman.

== Early life ==
Powles was born in Ōtaki, north of Wellington, in 1905. Powles was the son of Colonel Charles Guy Powles, a decorated military soldier who served with distinction during World War I as brigade major of New Zealand Mounted Rifles Brigade 1914–1916 and AA & QMG ANZAC Mounted Division 1916–1918. In 1922 he wrote the third volume of the Official History of New Zealand's Effort in the Great War, The New Zealanders in Sinai and Palestine, and in 1928 edited The history of the Canterbury Mounted Rifles 1914–1919 by officers of the regiment, and later became Chief of General Staff of the New Zealand Army.

Powles earned his LLB from Victoria University of Wellington and practised as a barrister in Wellington from 1929 to 1940. During the war, Powles went on active military service, and achieved the rank of colonel, commanding the New Zealand artillery regiment in the South Pacific at Guadalcanal and New Caledonia.

Powles was a founding member of the New Zealand Institute of International Affairs in 1934, along with Alister McIntosh, John Cawte Beaglehole, and William Sutch.

== Diplomatic career ==
Powles joined the fledgling Department of External Affairs in 1945, working alongside such notable figures as Alister McIntosh, George Laking, and later Frank Corner and Merwyn Norrish. His first assignment was in Washington, where he served as counsellor working on the Far Eastern Commission, established to work through the issues relating to Japan's surrender during World War II.

In 1949, Powles became New Zealand High Commissioner to Samoa: in this role, he was set to become the last New Zealand governor of that territory. Over the next ten years, Powles worked through the issues relating to Samoa's independence from New Zealand. In 1953, Powles was awarded the Queen Elizabeth II Coronation Medal.

In 1960, Powles became New Zealand High Commissioner to India, which he served until 1962.

Powles was involved in a large number of international conferences, including the UN United Nations Trusteeship Council, the South Pacific Commission, the Conference on Japanese Peace Treaty, the International Whaling Conference, the Economic Commission Conference, and the Colombo Plan Conference.

== Ombudsman ==
Powles was appointed a Knight Commander of the Order of the British Empire in the 1961 New Year Honours, and was made New Zealand's first Ombudsman in 1962. He served in this role until 1977, by which time he had been joined by another Ombudsman, and acted as Chief Ombudsman. Powles also acted as New Zealand's first Race Relations Conciliator. On the international stage, Powles did a substantial amount of work in promoting the office of the ombudsman.

Powles died in Wellington on 24 October 1994, and his ashes were buried at Karori Cemetery.

== Other information ==
Powles' son is diplomat Michael Powles, a former New Zealand High Commissioner to Fiji, and former Ambassador to Indonesia, China, and the United Nations. His grandson is Timothy Powles, producer, engineer and drummer for Australian band The Church.

== Awards ==
- Efficiency Decoration
- Companion of the Order of St Michael and St George
- In the New Year Honours 1961 Powles was appointed as Knight Commander of The Most Excellent Order of the British Empire
- On 6 February 1990, Powles was the eighteenth appointee to The Order of New Zealand, New Zealand's highest civil honour.
- Honorary LL.D from Victoria University of Wellington
- Received the Order of Tiafau, the highest award by the Samoan Government

Government offices
New creation	New Zealand Chief Ombudsman; 1962–1977	Succeeded by Sir George Laking
