= George Laking =

New Zealand diplomat (1912–2008)

Sir George Laking KCMG
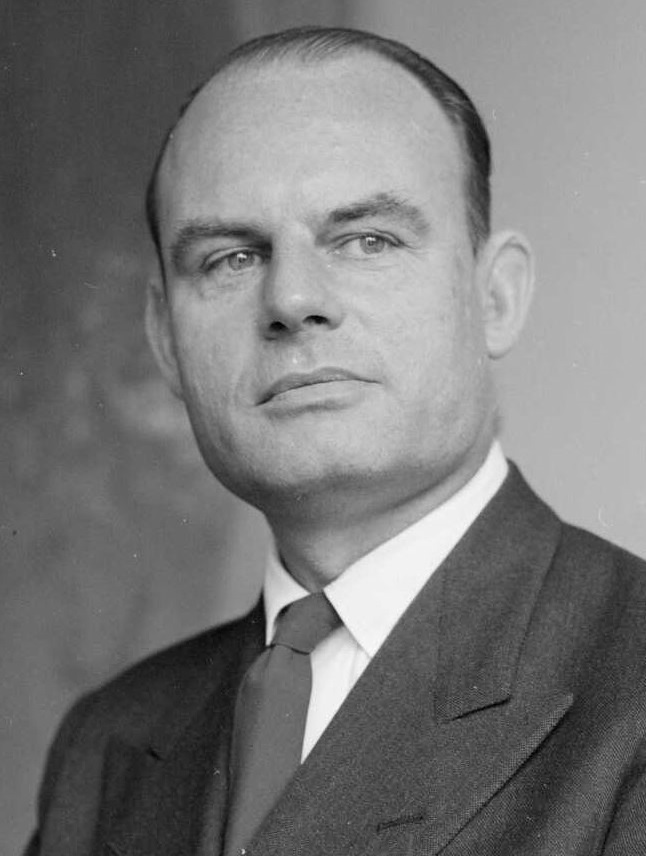
- Laking in 1958

2nd New Zealand Chief Ombudsman
- In office 1977–1984
- Preceded by: Guy Powles
- Succeeded by: Lester Castle

Personal details
- Born: George Robert Laking; 15 October 1912 Auckland, New Zealand
- Died: 10 January 2008 (aged 95)
- Education: Victoria University College (LLB)

Sir George Robert Laking KCMG (15 October 1912 – 10 January 2008) was a New Zealand diplomat who served as High Commissioner to the United Kingdom, Ambassador to the United States, Secretary of Foreign Affairs and Chief Ombudsman.

== Early life ==
Laking was born in Auckland, and educated at Auckland Grammar School, before completing his LLB at Victoria University College. He started working in the New Zealand Customs Department in 1929, before moving to the Prime Minister's Department in the fledgling Foreign Ministry. In 1940, Laking became head of the Organisation for National Security, managing the War Cabinet Secretariat, a post he held until 1948.

== Early postings ==
In 1949, Laking was appointed Minister to the New Zealand Embassy in Washington, serving as deputy to Ambassador Carl Berendsen, for seven years. During this time, Laking was frequently the main point of contact between New Zealand and the US administration, owing to Berendsen's substantial involvement in the establishment of the United Nations as Permanent Representative to that organisation. In 1953, Laking was awarded the Queen Elizabeth II Coronation Medal.

Laking returned to Wellington in 1956, following the death of deputy secretary Foss Shanahan, to act as Deputy Secretary of Foreign Affairs under Alister McIntosh. Laking was Acting High Commissioner to London from 1958 to 1961.

== Ambassador to Washington ==
Laking was based in Washington as Ambassador to the United States from 1961 to 1967. This was considered to be the most important of New Zealand's foreign postings, due to the prominence of the United States, and the shift of allegiance away from the United Kingdom towards the US. During this time, the key themes were the assassination of President John Fitzgerald Kennedy, and under President Lyndon B. Johnson, the tumultuous years of escalation of US involvement in Vietnam. Laking supported New Zealand involvement in Vietnam, and was under pressure from the US Government for New Zealand to send combat troops to the conflict. McIntosh was less supportive of the idea, but Defence Chiefs in Wellington, with the notable exception of Defence Secretary Jack Hunn, and politicians unwilling to offend US interests, supported the move.

== Secretary of Foreign Affairs ==
In 1967, Laking returned to Wellington where he succeeded McIntosh in the posts of Secretary of Foreign Affairs and as head of the Prime Minister's Department. He retired from the position of secretary of the Ministry of Foreign Affairs in October 1972 when he was replaced by Frank Corner. He was appointed a Companion of the Order of St Michael and St George in the 1969 New Year Honours.

== Chief Ombudsman ==
Laking was appointed an Ombudsman in 1975, working under Sir Guy Powles. In 1977, Laking succeeded Powles as Chief Ombudsman, holding that post until 1984. He was made a Knight Commander of the Order of St Michael and St George in the 1985 Queen's Birthday Honours.

Laking chaired the government commission which recommended changes in the alcohol licensing laws. These resulted in the 1989 Sale of Liquor Act.

== Notes ==
Diplomatic posts
Preceded by Lloyd White as Chargé d'Affaires in the United States	Ambassador to the United States; 1961–1967	Succeeded by Frank Corner
Government offices
Preceded by Sir Guy Powles	New Zealand Chief Ombudsman; 1977–1984	Succeeded by Lester Castle
