= Centre for Strategic Studies New Zealand =

New Zealand-based think tank

The Centre for Strategic Studies: New Zealand (CSS:NZ) is an international and military affairs research (strategic studies) centre located in Wellington, New Zealand. Jointly supported by the New Zealand Ministry of Defence, New Zealand Defence Force, New Zealand Ministry of Foreign Affairs and Trade, and Victoria University of Wellington, it is based in Victoria University's School of History, Philosophy, Political Science and International Relations.

== History ==
Established in 1993 following a perceived need to examine New Zealand's international relations and situation more closely, the centre has had four directors. Terence O'Brien, who was a former New Zealand diplomat with a career as New Zealand Ambassador to the United Nations in Geneva, the European Commission in Brussels, and the United Nations in New York, was appointed as Director when the centre was first established.

The Centre developed a reputation for independent advice and put out a number of publications and thought pieces related to New Zealand security and defence issues. David Dickens, the former deputy director of the CSS, took over when Mr O'Brien's term finished in 1999. Dickens was succeeded by Peter Cozens who retired in late 2009. Robert Ayson, formerly with the Strategic and Defence Studies Centre of the Australian National University, took over as Director and concurrent Professor of Strategic Studies in early 2010. The Current Director is Professor David Capie.

== Selected publications ==
- Mary Wareham, Clearing the fields: New Zealand and anti-personnel landmines ([Wellington, NZ]: CSS, 1995)
- Matake Kamiya, Will Japan go nuclear?: myth and reality ([Wellington, NZ]: CSS, 1995)
- Terence O'Brien, New Zealand and ASEAN : current and future outlook ([Wellington, NZ]: CSS, 1995)
- Peter Cozens (ed.), New Zealand's maritime environment & security (Wellington, NZ: CSS, 1996)
- Jayne Bishop, Peter Cozens and David Dickens (eds), New Zealand strategic studies guide, 1997/98 (Wellington, NZ: CSS, 1997)
- Tetsuya Endo, Japan and North Korea: an assessment and some policy approaches (Wellington, NZ: CSS, 1997)
- David C. Dickens, More than bombs and border tension: India and regional security (Wellington, NZ: CSS, 1997)
- David Dickens (ed), No better alternative: towards comprehensive and cooperative security in the Asia-Pacific (Wellington, NZ: CSS, 1997)
- Daizo Sakurada, For mutual benefit: the Japan-US Security Treaty: from a Japanese perspective (Wellington, NZ: Institute of Policy Studies, 1997)
- Terence O'Brien, Dimensions of Asia-Pacific security: a New Zealand perspective (Wellington, NZ: CSS, [1997])
- Terence O'Brien, International negotiations and small powers (address) ([Wellington, NZ]: CSS, [1997])
- Terence O'Brien, United Nations : legacy and reform (Wellington, NZ: CSS, 1997)
- Stuart Prior, Antarctica: view from a gateway (Wellington, NZ: CSS, 1997)
- David Dickens, Letting ordinary Kiwis in on defence (Wellington, NZ: CSS, 1999)
- Greg Talcott, Context and risk of organised illegal immigration to New Zealand: an exploration in policy relevant research (Wellington, NZ: CSS, c2000)
- C. Raja Mohan, Great powers and Asia's destiny: a view from Delhi (Wellington, NZ: CSS, 2011)
