= Malcolm Templeton =

New Zealand diplomat

Malcolm James Campbell Templeton QSO (12 May 1924 – 11 September 2017) was a New Zealand public servant and diplomat. He held a number of senior positions, including permanent representative to the United Nations, and deputy secretary of foreign affairs under secretary Merwyn Norrish.

Templeton was a supporter of the Halt All Racist Tours (HART) movement that opposed New Zealand's sporting contact with South Africa during the apartheid era, and was an opponent of French nuclear testing in the South Pacific.

The world needed another nuclear power like a hole in the head" – referring to the French nuclear testing at Moruroa atoll (recorded in interview as played in a BBC4 programme "Blowing Up Paradise: Liberty, Equality and Radioactivity

Templeton wrote a number of books and publications on New Zealand's foreign relations and defence.

In the 1997 Queen's Birthday Honours, Templeton was appointed a Companion of the Queen's Service Order for public services.

Templeton's brothers are veteran press gallery journalist Ian Templeton, and former diplomat and Minister Hugh Templeton.

== Publications ==
- Standing Upright Here: New Zealand in the Nuclear Age 1945–1990. (2006. Victoria University Press / New Zealand Institute of International Affairs, Wellington) ISBN 9780864735409
- Protecting Antarctica (2002)
- A Wise Adventure: New Zealand and the Antarctic 1923–1960 (2001)
- Human Rights and Sporting Contacts: New Zealand Attitudes to Race Relations in South Africa (1998, revised edition(?) 1999)
- Ties of Blood and Empire: New Zealand's Involvement in Middle East Defence and the Suez Crisis 1947–57 (1994)
- Defence and Security: What New Zealand Needs (1986)
- An eye, an ear and a voice: 50 years in New Zealand’s external relations edited by Malcolm Templeton (1993, Ministry of Foreign Affairs and Trade, Wellington NZ) ISBN 0-477-03725-9

Diplomatic posts
Preceded by John Scott	Permanent Representative to the United Nations in New York; 1973–1978	Succeeded by Tim Francis
