= Peter Cozens =

New Zealand finance director

Peter Cozens is the Director of Finance for the New Zealand Oceans Foundation.

== Biography ==
Peter Cozens grew up and attended school in the United Kingdom. From 1964 to 1972 he served in the British India Steam Navigation Company. He saw service in the company's cadetship, general cargo ships, passenger and cruise liners and consequently visited many ports of call in the Indian Ocean and in Asia. From 1972 to 1993 he served in the Royal New Zealand Navy and saw service in both the Pacific and Indian Oceans, retiring at the rank of Commander. He studied at the Royal Australian Naval Staff College and later at Victoria University of Wellington where he researched Asian culture and civilisation, graduating with a Master of Arts.

In 1995 he was appointed as Administrator (or in some references Operations Manager) at the Centre for Strategic Studies under original Director Terence O'Brien. Following the departure of David Dickens in 2002, Cozens was promoted to Director. He also served as Executive Director of the New Zealand Membership Committee of the Council for Security Cooperation in the Asia Pacific (CSCAP). He retired in 2009 and a book of essays was presented in his honour. In April 2019, he came out of retirement and joined Dr. Lance Beath and John Martin to form the New Zealand Oceans Foundation.

== Views on security issues ==
Cozens is an advocate for non-official or track two diplomacy. In a submission to the New Zealand government's 'Seriously Asia' conference in 2003, he expressed concerns about the country's commitment to understanding Asia. In particular, he lamented the lack of resources allocated to the work of think-tanks and track two organizations. Cozens has been quoted as saying the New Zealand Defence Force also needs to increase its expertise, in particular that there is a "need to lift the academic ability of our officer cadre: this is well overdue for real professional development." As a former Executive Director of the Centre for Strategic Studies, Cozens' duties include directing research, giving speeches, providing media commentary and contributing to the School of Government's Masters of Strategic Studies degree. He managed several full-time staff members, and also oversaw a number of the Centre's Senior Fellows, including former director Terence O'Brien, University of Auckland academic Stephen Hoadley, and Lance Beath.

Cozens has outlined his own views on strategic policy and security issues in numerous papers and books on terrorism, security and maritime cooperation in the Pacific-Asian region. In a 2005 newspaper interview, he called for a "softly softly, catchy monkey" approach to counter-terrorism, saying it would "reward authorities more than a 'reds under the bed', or 'terrorist under the bed' approach." In response to an Australian report that warned about future resource competition in the Antarctic, Cozens said the New Zealand Government "should think in terms of increasing New Zealand's military presence" near the south pole. The idea was not welcomed by the New Zealand Defence Force. In an article in the Australian journal 'Security Challenges' he argued that the New Zealand Defence Force should be renamed the "Armed Services of New Zealand" to reflect the fact that it increasingly performs a range of non-traditional functions. Cozens has also been a dogged advocate for New Zealand to adopt an oceans policy, noting that "whether it be swimming, or being at the beach, diving or watching seabirds, New Zealanders love the water."

Cozens' views have not found universal support. A letter to The Listener magazine in May 2006 described him as an "ex-navy wallah" who needs his "head read".

== Health issues and retirement ==
In early 2007 Peter Cozens was taken to hospital for stress related heart problems related to overwork. He recovered well. In 2009, he retired to Motueka, where he continues his research and writing about nautical and maritime subjects and where he is building a boat.
