= Nuclear-Test-Ban Act 1999 =

Ministry of Foreign Affairs and Trade (New Zealand)
- Long title: Nuclear-Test-Ban Act 1999
- Citation: https://www.legislation.govt.nz/act/public/1999/0010/latest/whole.html#DLM5533605
- Territorial extent: New Zealand
- Enacted by: New Zealand Parliament
- Enacted: c.1999
- Assented to: 9 March 1999
- Commenced: c.1999

Legislative history
- Bill title: Nuclear-Test-Ban-Act 1999
- Introduced by: Ministry of Foreign Affairs and Trade.
- First reading: 9 March 1999

Summary
- The act bans the testing of nuclear weapons in the country, making it illegal to do so. This act also binds to the Crown (monarchy) and applies outside the country if a citizen of the nation goes against this act.

Keywords
- Nuclear testings, nuclear weapons
- Status: In force

The Nuclear-Test-Ban Act 1999 (which was introduced by the Ministry of Foreign Affairs and Trade) prohibits the testing of nuclear weapons in New Zealand or by a citizen of New Zealand. It also makes it illegal for a citizen to not reveal information they may have on a person suspected of going against this act. This act has been changed through different versions. The provisions which will be listed in this article are from the most recent version (not the one in 2021, the 2021 version is technically considered a second separate legislation according to the New Zealand government).

== History ==
This act was passed in 1999 though many versions of it have come out. While there is little information on how the act was passed it is apparent that this act has indeed passed.

== Provisions ==
There are a total of 6 parts to this legislation excluding the contents:

- Preliminary provisions
- Prohibitions and offences
- Information and documents
- Clarification inspections
- On-site inspections
- Miscellaneous provisions

== See also ==
- New Zealand Government
- Comprehensive Nuclear-Test-Ban Treaty
