= John Wood (diplomat) =

New Zealand diplomat

John Wood CNZM QSO
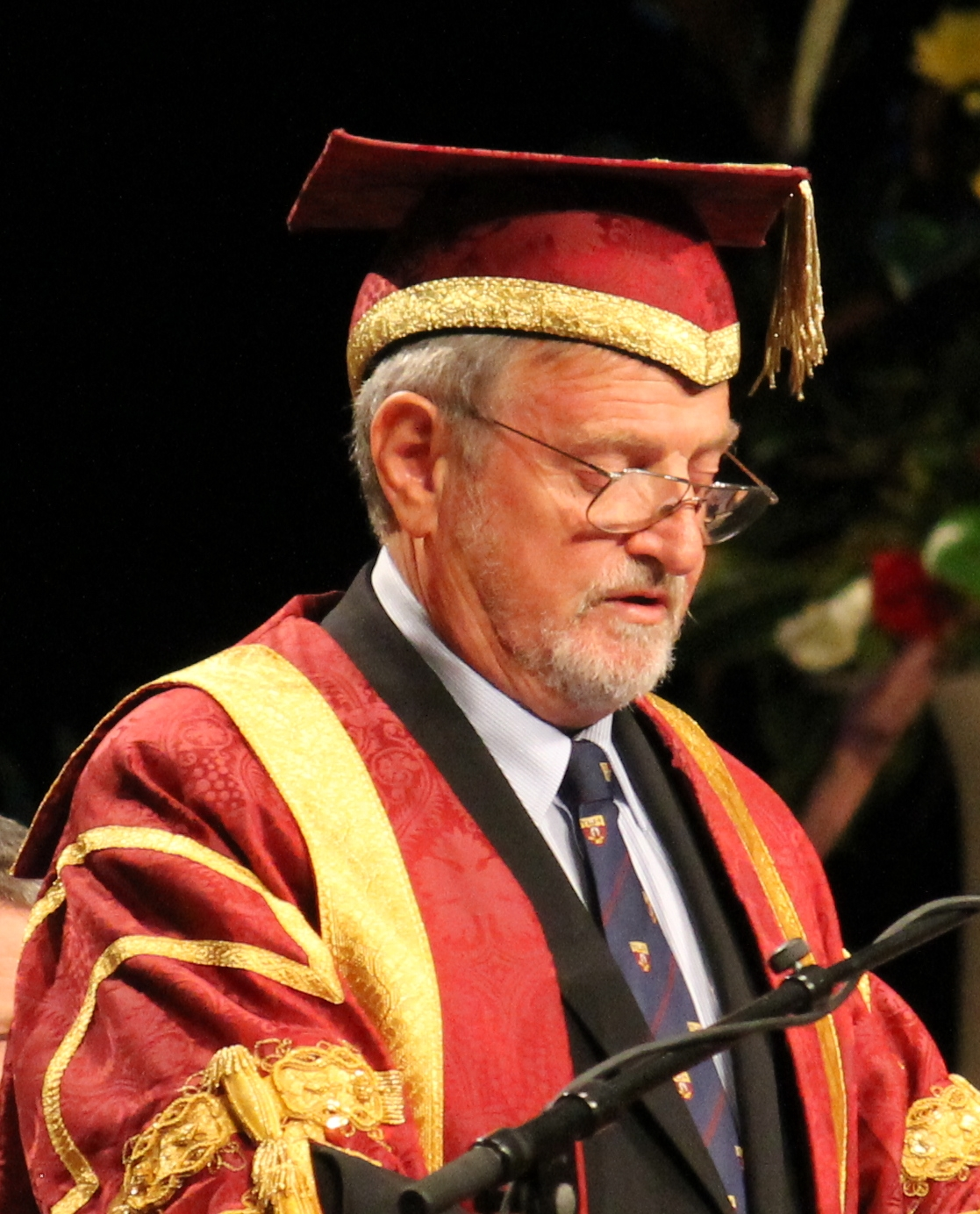
- Wood in 2014

14th Chancellor of the University of Canterbury
- In office 2 December 2011 – 1 May 2019
- Preceded by: Rex Williams
- Succeeded by: Susan McCormack

13th New Zealand Ambassador to the United States
- In office 25 January 2002 – 27 February 2006
- Prime Minister: Helen Clark
- Preceded by: Jim Bolger
- Succeeded by: Roy Ferguson
- In office 23 June 1994 – 10 September 1998
- Prime Minister: Jim Bolger; Jenny Shipley
- Preceded by: Denis McLean
- Succeeded by: Jim Bolger

Personal details
- Born: Lionel John Wood; 1944 (age 81–82) Kaikōura, New Zealand
- Education: University of Canterbury (MA, Hons); Balliol College, University of Oxford (BPhil)

Lionel John Wood CNZM QSO (born 1944) is a New Zealand former diplomat and a former chancellor of the University of Canterbury. He was Deputy Secretary of Foreign Affairs, and served two separate terms as New Zealand's Ambassador to the United States in Washington.

== Early life ==
Born in Kaikōura, Wood was educated at the University of Canterbury, graduating with an MA (first class honours) in 1964. He then studied at Balliol College, University of Oxford, earning a BPhil.

== Professional career ==
Wood joined the Ministry of Foreign Affairs in 1969, and served as First Secretary in Tokyo in 1974. He then worked as Prime Minister Robert Muldoon’s Foreign Policy adviser, and served as deputy chief of Mission at the New Zealand Embassy in Bonn.

Wood was Deputy Chief of Mission at New Zealand's Embassy in Washington from 1984 to 1987, and Chargé d'Affaires at the post from 1984 to 1985, at a key time in New Zealand's relationship with the United States, including New Zealand's withdrawal from the ANZUS treaty.

Wood was New Zealand's Ambassador to Iran in 1987, and the first ambassador to Turkey in 1989. He was also high commissioner to Pakistan. In 1991 he became Deputy Secretary of Foreign Affairs, responsible for trade and economic policy, and one of the key officials driving New Zealand's role in Asia-Pacific Economic Cooperation (APEC), and the World Trade Organization (WTO). Wood headed New Zealand delegations and negotiations to the WTO Ministerial meetings in Seattle in 1999, and Doha in 2001. He was inducted into the Consumers for World Trade Hall of Fame for his services in the promotion of free trade.

In 1994, Wood became New Zealand's Ambassador to the United States, in Washington. He held this post for four years, before returning to New Zealand again as Deputy Secretary for trade and economic policy. In this post, Wood was instrumental in securing Don McKinnon’s posting as Secretary-General of the Commonwealth, and Mike Moore’s posting as Director-General of the WTO.

In 2002, Wood was again posted as New Zealand's Ambassador to Washington, replacing former Prime Minister Jim Bolger.

Wood retired from the Foreign Service in 2006 to Christchurch, where he became an adjunct professor of Political Science. Wood also received an honorary doctorate from the University of Canterbury in 2004.

In the 2006 Queen's Birthday Honours, Wood was appointed a Companion of the Queen's Service Order for public services.

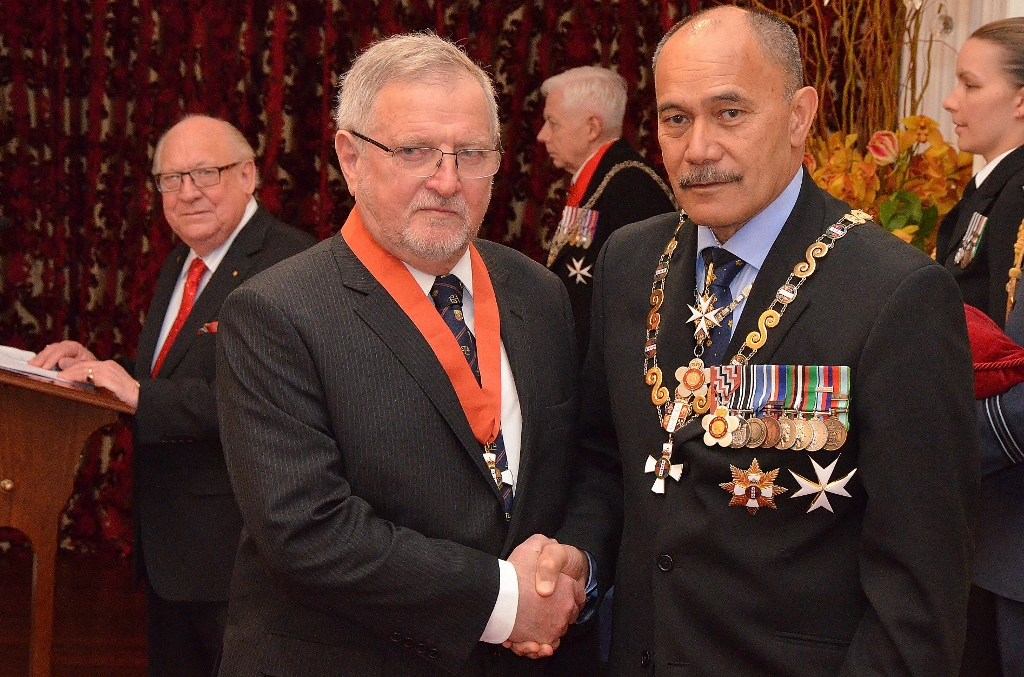
Wood (left) is congratulated by the governor-general, Sir Jerry Mateparae, after his investiture as a Companion of the New Zealand Order of Merit at Government House, Wellington, on 8 September 2015

In 2009, Treaty of Waitangi Negotiations Minister Chris Finlayson appointed him the Crown's lead negotiator in talks with Whanganui iwi. In the 2015 Queen's Birthday Honours, Wood was appointed a Companion of the New Zealand Order of Merit, for services to tertiary education and Māori.

In August 2017, Wood was appointed chairman of the Canterbury District Health Board by Health Minister Jonathan Coleman, replacing Murray Cleverley (resigned) and succeeding the acting chair Mark Solomon.

As of 2022, Wood is a member of the Board of Te Urewera, a protected area in the North Island.

Diplomatic posts
Preceded by Denis McLean	Ambassador to the United States; 1994–1998; 2002–2006	Succeeded by Jim Bolger
Preceded by Jim Bolger	Ambassador to the United States; 1994–1998; 2002–2006	Succeeded by Roy Ferguson
Academic offices
Preceded by Rex Williams	Chancellor of the University of Canterbury; 2012–2019	Succeeded by Susan McCormack
