= Graham Fortune =

New Zealand diplomat and public servant (1941–2016)

Graham Fortune CNZM

New Zealand Permanent Representative to the United Nations in Geneva
- In office 1987–1990
- Preceded by: Richard Nottage
- Succeeded by: Tim Hannah

New Zealand High Commissioner to Australia
- In office 1994–1999
- Preceded by: Ted Woodfield
- Succeeded by: Simon Murdoch

New Zealand Secretary of Defence
- In office 1999–2006
- Preceded by: Gerald Hensley
- Succeeded by: John McKinnon

Personal details
- Born: Graham Charles Fortune; 13 December 1941 Dunedin, New Zealand
- Died: 19 March 2016 (aged 74) Auckland, New Zealand
- Education: University of Otago

Graham Charles Fortune CNZM (13 December 1941 – 19 March 2016) was a New Zealand diplomat and public servant. He served as New Zealand's High Commissioner to Australia from 1994 to 1999, and Secretary of Defence from 1999 until 2006.

== Early life and family ==
Fortune was born on 13 December 1941, the son of Winifred Jessie Fortune (née Hutchison) and her husband, Charles Henry Fortune, a journalist who died when he was at school. Educated at King's High School, Dunedin from 1955 to 1959, he went on to study chemistry and geology at the University of Otago, graduating with a Bachelor of Science in 1962 and a Master of Science in 1963. His thesis, supervised by Geoff Malcolm, was entitled Measurement of thermal pressure coefficients of polyethylene and polypropylene.

== Career ==
After leaving university, Fortune worked as a journalist for four years on the Dunedin Evening Star. In April 1964 he joined the Department of External Affairs. Initially he was in the South Pacific and Antarctic Affairs Division, and involved with administration of New Zealand's science and exploration programme in the Ross Dependency and the development of Scott Base. He then had a number of overseas postings, including to the Cook Islands in 1965, five years in Ottawa, and three years in Papua New Guinea. After a secondment to the State Services Commission from 1977 to 1980, he was a senior administrator in the Ministry of Foreign Affairs for six years before being appointed the deputy secretary of Foreign Affairs. From 1987 to 1990 he served as New Zealand's permanent representative to the United Nations in Geneva, and he was High Commissioner to Australia from 1994 to 1999.

Fortune was as Secretary of Defence from 1999 until his retirement in 2006. He subsequently served as a board member of Antarctica New Zealand and undertook various consultancy roles for the New Zealand government in the areas of policy and management.

In the 2007 New Year Honours, Fortune was appointed a Companion of the New Zealand Order of Merit, for public services.

== Orienteering ==
Outside of his career as a public servant, Fortune was active in orienteering, and won several Australian and New Zealand championships. He served as vice president of the New Zealand Orienteering Federation from 2007 to 2008, and was a member of the steering committee for the 2013 Orienteering World Cup.

== Death ==
Fortune died suddenly in Auckland on 19 March 2016.
