= Lloyd White =

Lloyd White may refer to:

- Lloyd White (diplomat) (1918–1981), New Zealand diplomat and public servant
- Lloyd White (rugby league) (born 1988), Welsh rugby league footballer
