= List of permanent representatives of New Zealand to the United Nations in Geneva =

The permanent representative of New Zealand to the United Nations in Geneva is New Zealand's foremost diplomatic representative at the offices of the United Nations in Geneva, and in charge of New Zealand's diplomatic mission to the United Nations in Geneva.

The Permanent Delegation is located at New Zealand's consulate-general in Geneva. New Zealand has maintained a resident Permanent Representative to the UN in Geneva since 1961.

== Permanent representatives to the United Nations in Geneva ==
- Doug Zohrab (1961–65)
- Gray Thorp (1965–68)
- Helen Hampton (1968–71)
- Brian Lendrum (1971–73)
- Geoffrey Leonard Easterbrook-Smith (1973–77)
- Ted Farnon (1977–80)
- Terence O'Brien (1980–83)
- Roger Peren (1983–84)
- Richard Nottage (1984–87)
- Graham Fortune (1987–90)
- Tim Hannah (1990–91)
- Alastair Bisley (1991–94)
- Wade Armstrong (1994–98)
- Roger Farrell (1998–2002)
- Tim Caughley (2002–06 )
- Don MacKay (2006–10)
- Dell Higgie (2010–13)
- Amanda Ellis (2013–2016)
- Lucy Duncan (2020–present)

== See also ==
- List of permanent representatives of New Zealand to the United Nations in New York
- List of permanent representatives of New Zealand to the United Nations in Vienna
