= Tim Francis =

New Zealand diplomat (1928–2016)

Harold Huyton Francis (1 May 1928 – 2 January 2016), known as Tim Francis, was a New Zealand diplomat. He was the nation's permanent representative to the United Nations from 1978 to 1982, and Ambassador to the United States from 1988 to 1991. From 1984 to 1988, he was the Administrator of Tokelau,

Diplomatic posts
Preceded by Malcolm Templeton	Permanent Representative to the United Nations in New York; 1978–1982	Succeeded by Bryce Harland
Preceded by Bill Rowling	Ambassador to the United States; 1988–1991	Succeeded by Denis McLean
Government offices
Preceded by Frank Corner	Administrator of Tokelau; 1984–1988	Succeeded by Neil Walter
