= Terence O'Brien (New Zealand diplomat) =

New Zealand diplomat (1936–2022)

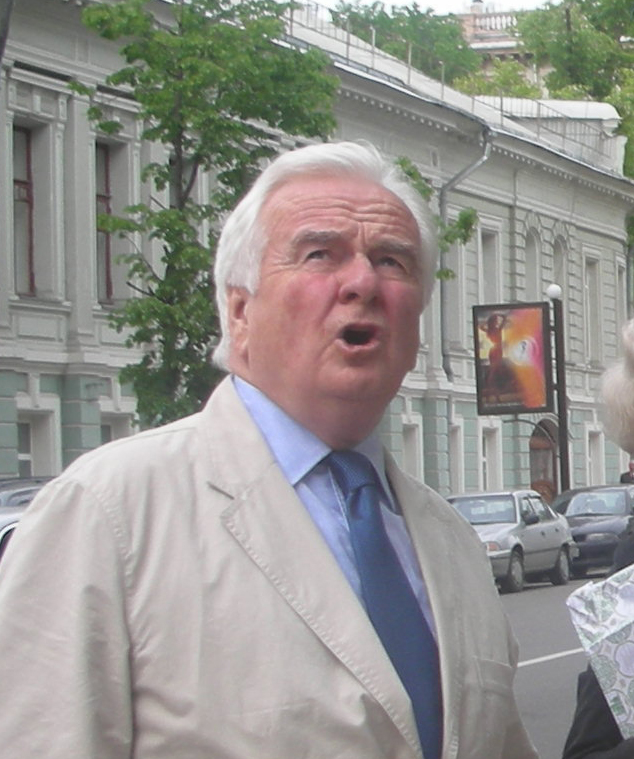
- O'Brien in Moscow

Permanent representative of New Zealand to the United Nations in New York
- In office 1990–1993
- Preceded by: Ann Hercus
- Succeeded by: Colin Keating

New Zealand ambassador to Belgium
- In office 1983–1986
- Preceded by: John G. McArthur
- Succeeded by: Gerry Thompson

Permanent representative of New Zealand to the United Nations in Geneva
- In office 1980–1983
- Preceded by: Ted Farnon
- Succeeded by: Roger Peren

High Commissioner of New Zealand to the Cook Islands
- In office 1975–1977
- Preceded by: George Brocklehurst
- Succeeded by: Brian Absolum

Personal details
- Born: Terence Christopher O'Brien; 6 January 1936 Aylesbury, Buckinghamshire, England
- Died: 30 December 2022 (aged 86) Wellington, New Zealand
- Spouse: Elizabeth O'Brien
- Children: 4 (John, Georgia, Daniel, Timothy)
- Profession: Diplomat

Terence Christopher O'Brien (6 January 1936 – 30 December 2022) was a New Zealand diplomat. He led New Zealand in 1993 to a seat on the United Nations Security Council and played a strong role in helping to reshape New Zealand's perceptions of itself as a small but fiercely independent nation in the South Pacific.

== Early life ==
O'Brien was born in Aylesbury, Buckinghamshire, England, on 6 January 1936. His father, Wing Commander Oliver James O'Brien, was a pilot in the Royal Air Force (RAF) who was sent to New Zealand during the Second World War including to train pilots who fought in the battle of Britain. In 1940, he moved with his mother and sister to New Zealand by boat, narrowly avoiding being torpedoed by German U-boats, to follow his father who had taken up a post as Chief Air Instructor to the Royal New Zealand Air Force (RNZAF) during the Second World War. Shortly after the end of the war, O'Brien returned from New Zealand, via ship, to the United Kingdom to be educated at Beaumont College, and later University College Oxford where he read history. Following graduation O'Brien returned to New Zealand with which he had developed a great affinity in his early years and joined the then Department of External Affairs (subsequently the Ministry of Foreign Affairs and Trade) in 1959.

O'Brien became a naturalised New Zealand citizen in 1962.

== Career ==
O'Brien served as a diplomat with the New Zealand Ministry of Foreign Affairs and Trade for over 40 years from 1959 – 2001. He held early postings in the 1960s in Bangkok, London, and Brussels. It was in Brussels that as a first secretary he helped New Zealand to negotiate a special deal with the European Community giving access for New Zealand dairy products to Europe when the United Kingdom joined the Community in 1972. O'Brien then served as High Commissioner to the Cook Islands (1975–77), and then as Ambassador to the United Nations in Geneva (1980–83), to the European Community in Brussels (1983–86) and finally to the United Nations in New York (1990–93) where he was instrumental in helping New Zealand to secure a seat on the UN Security Council. He was President of the United Nations Security Council during the war in Yugoslavia. While in New York, his leadership was a critical factor in New Zealand's securing a seat on the United Nations Security Council, despite competition from more favoured countries such as Spain and Sweden. Given the nickname "Chardonnay O'Brien" first by former prime minister David Lange and later by the New Zealand media for his love of a good glass of wine and a good cocktail party, O'Brien was known for his global view and his articulation of the role of New Zealand as an independent and free-thinking country with its own values and way of doing things. O'Brien had always believed that small countries like New Zealand need to use and support international institutions such as the United Nations to promote common and universal values and have influence in international affairs.

He is also thought to be the only New Zealander who over the course of his long and distinguished diplomatic career occupied all three posts of New Zealand Ambassador to the UN in Geneva, New Zealand Ambassador to the EU in Brussels, and later New Zealand Ambassador to the UN in New York.

== Later years ==
In 1993 O'Brien was appointed Founding Director of the New Zealand Centre for Strategic Studies He served as Director for almost 8 years until his retirement in 2001, earning the new institution a respected reputation and high public profile. Controversy surrounded his replacement in 2002 by David Dickens, a former Ministry of Defence official. The Parliamentary Select Committee on Foreign Affairs, Defence and Trade investigated the matter and issued a critical report.

In 2009, O'Brien published a book entitled 'Presence of Mind: New Zealand in the World'. The book is a selection of writings on the place of New Zealand in the world reflecting on the position of a small country such as New Zealand and its place on the international stage from the perspective of a small, internationally minded, modern and multicultural democracy. The book stresses the importance of New Zealand taking an independent view on international affairs, reflecting its heritage as a nation located in the south-west Pacific with both Maori and European roots. The book showed enormous foresight in future describing New Zealand's new place in the world and represents a departure from many of the tunnel vision views of the past as expressed by some New Zealand politicians and diplomats.

In 2016, on the occasion of his 80th birthday, he established the Terence O'Brien Scholarship in International Affairs at Victoria University of Wellington in New Zealand. The scholarship aims to recognise and encourage top Honours and Master's students in International Relations and Strategic Studies who are studying some aspect of international governance, multilateral diplomacy or cooperation in the political, economic, or security areas. Every year since 2016, one student has received the scholarship award. Each student receives a copy of Terence O'Brien's book 'Presence of Mind: New Zealand in the World'.

During 2012, Terence O'Brien wrote several articles arguing against proposed reforms in the New Zealand Ministry of Foreign Affairs and Trade. His argument was that becoming a diplomat requires a special type of skill and that treating the Ministry of Foreign Affairs with a purely or even a mainly business approach was short-sighted and not to the long-term benefit of New Zealand. He turned out to be right.

Right up until mid-2021 when he suffered a stroke which limited his mobility, O'Brien continued to contribute part-time as an Advisor to the Centre for Strategic Studies and he was also a regular contributor to the New Zealand media on foreign policy issues. He also spoke on multiple occasions at events organised by Diplosphere, a non-partisan and independent think tank set up and managed by his daughter-in-law, Maty Nikkhou O'Brien with support from one of his sons, Daniel O'Brien.

O'Brien died in Wellington on 30 December 2022, at the age of 86.

O'Brien had obituaries in Stuff and Victoria University of Wellington and Radio New Zealand.

On 22 March 2023, Diplosphere, founded by the Terence's daughter in law, and one of his sons, Daniel organized an event in Wellington on 'Forging an Independent Foreign Policy for New Zealand: Terence O'Brien's imprint. The event was attended by over 250 participants and was covered in the New Zealand Herald here. One of his son's, John, spoke at the event.

Terence O'Brien's memoirs entitled "Consolations of Insignificance" were published in May 2023. The foreword has been written by the late former New Zealand Prime Minister Jim Bolger. The launch was at Unity Bookshops in Wellington in 2023.

The organisation, Diplosphere continues to organize events which feature Terence O'Brien's views on New Zealand foreign policy.
