= Denis McLean =

New Zealand diplomat, academic (1930–2011)

Denis McLean CMG
- Born: Denis Bazeley Gordon McLean; 18 August 1930; Napier, New Zealand
- Died: 30 March 2011 (aged 80); Wellington, New Zealand
- Occupation: Public servant
- Spouse: Anne Davidson
- Children: 3

Denis Bazeley Gordon McLean CMG (18 August 1930 – 30 March 2011) was a New Zealand diplomat, academic, author and civil servant.

== Early life, family and education ==
McLean was born in Napier. He was the eldest son of Gordon McLean, a newspaper editor, and Ruahine Smith. His family later lived in Auckland and Wellington.

McLean attended Nelson College from 1944 to 1948, earned a Master of Science with first-class honours in geology at Victoria University College, and won a Senior Scholarship in 1953 and a Rhodes Scholarship to the University of Oxford in 1954. At University College, Oxford, he studied politics, philosophy and economics. He played rugby union at both Victoria and Oxford Universities, and was a member of the Victoria team that won the Jubilee Cup three times in the early 1950s.

In early 1958, McLean married Anne Davidson in Oxford, and the couple went on to have three children.

== Career ==
After graduating from Oxford, McLean joined the New Zealand Department of External Affairs in 1957. He was posted to Washington, D.C. (1960–63), Paris (1963–66), Kuala Lumpur (1966–68) and London (1972–77), where he studied at the Royal College of Defence Studies and was deputy high commissioner. He was Secretary of Defence from 1979 to 1988 and ambassador to the United States from 1991 to 1994.

In the 1989 Queen's Birthday Honours, McLean was appointed a Companion of the Order of St Michael and St George.

After he retired from government service in 1995, McLean was appointed the Joan and James Warburg Chair of International Relations at Simmons College in Boston. His distinguished career as a public servant, writer, historian and commentator on international relations also led him to be a visiting fellow at the Strategic and Defence Studies Centre at the Australian National University in Canberra, the Woodrow Wilson International Center for Scholars, the Carnegie Endowment for International Peace, and the U.S. Institute of Peace. He also served for several years on the New Zealand Press Council.

== Works ==
McLean wrote three books: The Long Pathway, Te Araroa (1986), about walking the east coast of the North Island with his family; The Prickly Pair (2003), on Australia-New Zealand relations; and Howard Kippenberger: Dauntless Spirit (2008), a biography of the military commander Sir Howard Kippenberger. The common theme underlying the apparent diversity of McLean's writing was a fascination with New Zealand's evolving national identity.

== Death ==
McLean died on 30 March 2011 at his home in Wellington.

Diplomatic posts
Preceded by Tim Francis	Ambassador to the United States; 1991–1994	Succeeded by John Wood
