= Alister McIntosh =

New Zealand diplomat

Sir Alister Donald Miles McIntosh KCMG (29 November 1906 – 30 November 1978) was a New Zealand diplomat. McIntosh was New Zealand's first secretary of foreign affairs serving as the principal foreign policy adviser to Prime Ministers Peter Fraser, Sidney Holland, Keith Holyoake, and Walter Nash. He is widely considered to be the father of New Zealand's independent foreign policy and architect of the former Department of External Affairs, now the Ministry of Foreign Affairs and Trade, in New Zealand.

== Early life ==
McIntosh was born in Picton, the eldest of four children of Caroline Margaret Cowles (née Miles) and Henry Hobson McIntosh, a telegraphist.

He was educated at Marlborough College from 1920 to 1924, where he undertook the first section of a BA degree. He then continued his education part-time while a civil servant at Victoria College, where after preparing a thesis on Marlborough's political history, he earned an MA in History in 1930.

== Early public service career ==
McIntosh joined the New Zealand the public service as a cadet in the Department of Labour's head office in March 1925, where he was employed in the library. In July 1926 he transferred to the Legislative Department after taking a position as an assistant librarian in the General Assembly Library.

After being awarded a Carnegie Fellowship and he was granted in 1932 a year's leave of absence to study library development and archive procedure in the United States and Canada. During his way home he spent several months in the United Kingdom visiting libraries and archives. Following his return to New Zealand in July 1933, he wrote a farsighted report on library requirements in New Zealand, in which he proposed establishing a national bibliographical centre, a rural library service, introducing inter-library lending. He also proposed amalgamating the Alexander Turnbull Library, the General Assembly Library, the national archives and the New Zealand Institute Library into a national library. While his proposals were not implemented at the time many were later to come into fruition.

Following his return he became actively involved in the Institute of Pacific Relations being its secretary from 1934 to 35. He was also one of the founders of the New Zealand Institute of International Affairs which was established at a meeting in Wellington on 7 July 1934. McIntosh was served as its first Secretary-Treasurer.

McIntosh worked and was close to such intellectuals as Dr William Sutch, Frank Corner, and eminent historian J.C. Beaglehole.

== Prime Minister's Department ==
In February 1935, Carl Berendsen, the new head of the Prime Minister's Department, arranged for McIntosh to be as seconded to his department as a research officer. McIntosh organised an information and statistical section. In February 1936 he formally transferred to the Prime Minister's Department and with time effectively became Berendsen's deputy.

== World War II ==
Following the outbreak of World War II, McIntosh was appointed to the war publicity committee and was also among an ad hoc committee of government officials which censored books and periodicals entering the country. During the war years, McIntosh chaired the economic stabilisation committee, and worked closely with Prime Minister Peter Fraser. In late 1942 he accompanied Fraser, on a visit to the United States and Canada. Following Berendsen's posting to Canberra in 1943, McIntosh succeeded him as secretary of the War Cabinet. In the same year, he was appointed head of the newly established Department of External Affairs, the precursor to the Ministry of Foreign Affairs. He accompanied Fraser to the Australia–New Zealand meeting in January 1944 and later that same year to the 1944 Commonwealth Prime Ministers' Conference in London. McIntosh was a senior member of the New Zealand delegation to the San Francisco Conference in 1945, which was to lead to the establishment of the United Nations. In October 1945 he became, in addition to his other duties, Permanent Head of the Prime Minister's Department. 1946 saw him spending several months in Paris attending the peace conference, while in 1947 he took part in Commonwealth talks in Canberra on the Japanese peace settlement. In 1948 he was a member of the New Zealand delegation to the United Nations General Assembly.

== Post war ==
Following the end of World War II, McIntosh, despite restrictions on government expenditure, commenced building up and staffing the Department of External Affairs. As head of the Department of External Affairs McIntosh took a key role in the establishment of the United Nations, along with Berendsen, who by that stage was New Zealand's Ambassador to Washington and to the United Nations in New York.

== Nomination to be Commonwealth Secretary General ==
In 1965 McIntosh was nominated to the position of Commonwealth Secretary-General and it was widely expected that he would be elected at the Commonwealth Prime Ministers' Conference later that year. At the eleventh hour Keith Holyoake, the Prime Minister of New Zealand, was approached by British security officials. They appear to have advised that McIntosh was a security risk as his homosexuality would make him susceptible to blackmail. As a result, the British government was not prepared to support his candidacy. McIntosh subsequently withdrew his candidacy claiming ill-health (he had issues with his inner ear, which affected his hearing and balance).

He retired as Secretary of Foreign Affairs in 1966 (he was succeeded by George Laking), but then established New Zealand's posting in Italy, serving as ambassador there until 1970.

== Retirement ==
In retirement, McIntosh served as Chairman of the Historic Places Trust, Chairman of the trustees of the National Library, and Chairman of the Broadcasting Commission during the transition to colour television.

Ngaio Marsh, in her 1974 mystery novel Black As He's Painted, thanks McIntosh (and P. J. Humphries) for advice on matters ambassadorial and linguistic related to an African embassy in London.

McIntosh's health deteriorated during 1977, with several strokes limiting the use of his right arm and hand. He died at Wellington on 30 November 1978 and was cremated at Karori.

== Personal life ==
A homosexual during a period in New Zealand when even the suspicion of homosexuality could destroy a career. McIntosh chose discretion. He married Doris Hutchinson Pow, a librarian, in Wellington on 20 September 1934. They had a son, James during their lifetime marriage.

== Honours and awards ==
In 1953, McIntosh was awarded the Queen Elizabeth II Coronation Medal. In the 1957 New Year Honours, he was appointed a Companion of the Order of St Michael and St George, in recognition of his services as permanent head of the Prime Minister's Department and secretary of external affairs. He was elevated to Knight Commander of the Order of St Michael and St George, for devoted public service, in the 1973 Queen's Birthday Honours.
