= Geoff Malcolm =

New Zealand physical chemist (1931–2019)

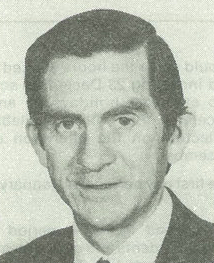
- Born: Geoffrey Norman Malcolm; 23 April 1931; Feilding, New Zealand
- Died: 11 August 2019 (aged 88); Palmerston North, New Zealand
- Education: Canterbury University College (MSc(Hons)); University of Manchester (PhD)
- Spouse: Sheila Mary Wilson (m. 1958)
- Children: 4
- Scientific career
- Fields: Physical chemistry
- Workplaces: Massey University
- Notable students: Graham Fortune

Geoffrey Norman Malcolm (23 April 1931 – 11 August 2019) was a New Zealand physical chemist. Appointed in 1969, he was the first chemistry professor at Massey University.

== Biography ==
Born in Feilding on 23 April 1931, Malcolm was educated at Feilding Agricultural High School. He then studied at Canterbury University College, graduating Master of Science with first-class honours in 1954. He was awarded an 1851 Exhibition Memorial Scholarship, and completed doctoral studies at the University of Manchester in 1956.

In 1958, Malcolm married Sheila Mary Wilson, and the couple went on to have four children.

After a short period as an assistant lecturer at the University of Manchester in 1956–57, Malcolm returned to New Zealand. He was appointed as a lecturer in chemistry at the University of Otago in 1958, rising to the rank of reader. In 1969, he was appointed as professor of physical chemistry at Massey University, and was the first professor of chemistry at that institution. He later served as dean of science from 1984 to 1994. Following his retirement in 1995, he was conferred the title of professor emeritus. Malcolm was elected a Fellow of the New Zealand Institute of Chemistry (NZIC) in 1966, and served as president of the NZIC in 1977.

Malcolm died in Palmerston North on 11 August 2019.
