= List of high commissioners of New Zealand to India =

Diplomats of New Zealand to India

Patrick Rata

High commissioner of New Zealand to India
- Incumbent
- Assumed office 2024
- Prime Minister: Christopher Luxon
- Preceded by: David Pine

The high commissioner of New Zealand to India is New Zealand's foremost diplomatic representative in India, and in charge of New Zealand's diplomatic mission in India. As fellow members of the Commonwealth of Nations, they exchange diplomatic relations in governmental level rather than through heads of state. Thus the countries exchange high commissioners, rather than ambassadors.

The high commission is located in New Delhi, India's capital city.

New Zealand has maintained a resident high commissioner in India since 1970, except for a period from 1982 until 1985. The high commissioner to India is concurrently accredited to Bangladesh as High Commissioner and Nepal as Ambassador.

== List of heads of mission ==
=== High commissioners to India ===
Resident HCs

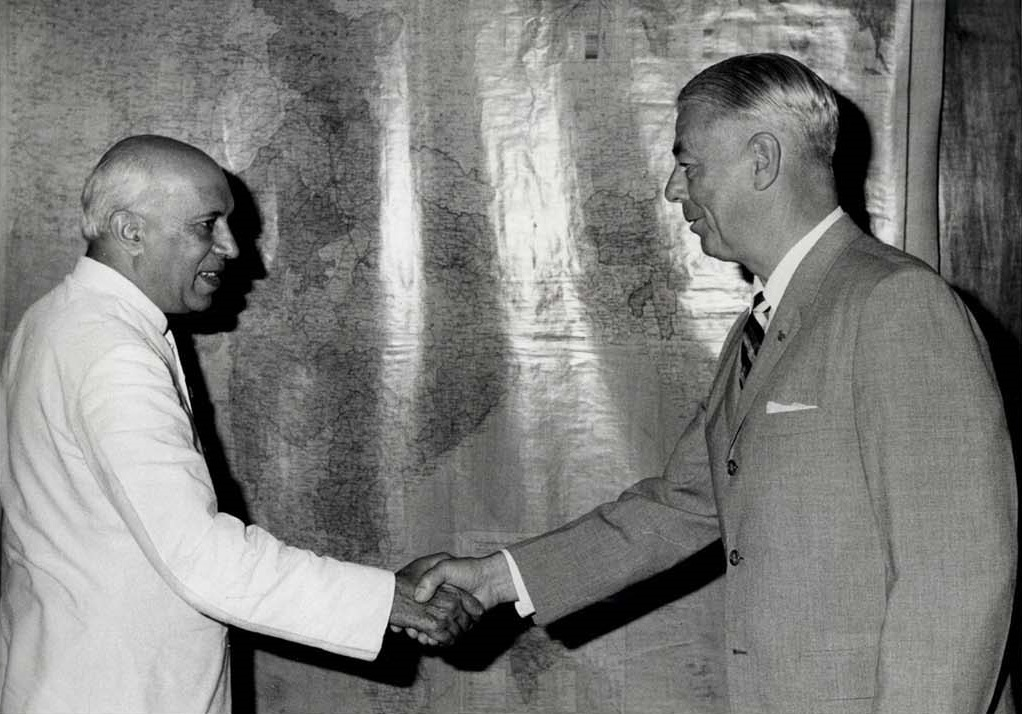
Fred de Malmanche (right) meeting Jawaharlal Nehru (left) in March 1963

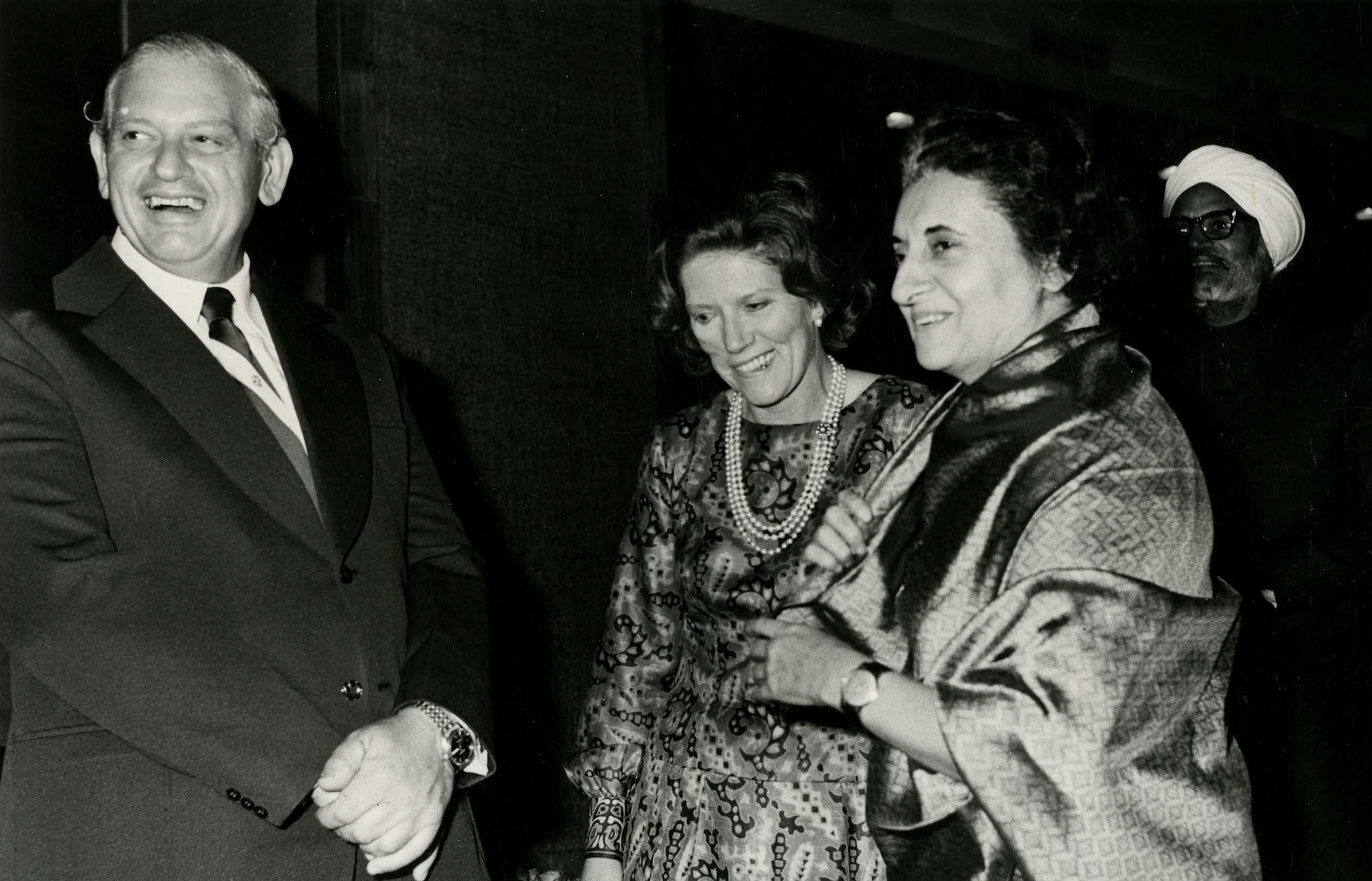
Norman Kirk at the High Commissioner's reception on 29 December 1973 with Mrs Cunninghame, the wife of the New Zealand High Commissioner, and Indira Gandhi

- Bill Challis (1958–1960)
- Sir Guy Powles (1960–1963)
- Fred de Malmanche (1963–1965)
- James Esmond Farrell (1965–1968)
- Brian Lendrum (1968–1971)

Post vacant (1971–1972)

- Rex Cunninghame (1972–1975)
- Colin Aikman (1975–1979)
- Don Harper (1979–1981)
- Barry Brooks (1981–1982)

Non-resident high commissioners, resident in Wellington

- Barry Brooks (1982–1983)
- David McDowell (1983–1985)

Resident HCs

- Sir Edmund Hillary (1985–1989)
- Priscilla Williams (1989–1993)
- Nick Bridge (1993–1997)
- Adrian Simcock (1997–2001)
- Caroline McDonald (2001–2004)
- Graeme Waters (2004–2007)
- Rupert Holborow (2007–2011)
- Jan Henderson (2011–2014)
- Grahame Morton (2014–2017)
- Joanna Kempkers (2017–2020)
- David Pine (2020-2024)
- Patrick Rata (2024–Present)
