= Foss Shanahan =

New Zealand diplomat and public servant (1910–1964)

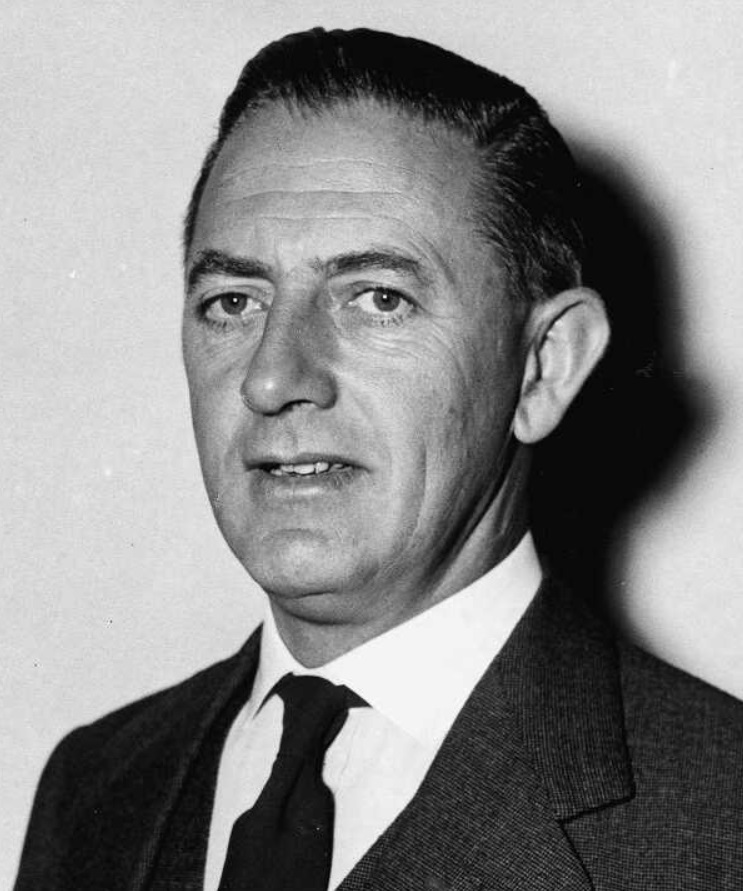
Shanahan in 1955

Foss Shanahan CMG (10 June 1910 – 13 September 1964) was a New Zealand diplomat and public servant.

== Biography ==
Shanahan was born on 10 June 1910 at Alexandra. He was educated at the Christian Brothers' Boys' School in Dunedin and Waitaki Boys' High School, passing the public service entrance examination in 1926. He joined the public service in 1928 and studied part-time at the University of Otago and Victoria University of Wellington, graduating from Victoria with a Master of Laws (LLM) in 1936.

He started in the Customs Department, then in 1939 joined the Prime Minister’s Department, in the section that became the New Zealand Ministry of Foreign Affairs and Trade. He was Assistant Secretary of the War Cabinet 1940-45, Deputy Secretary of the External Affairs Department 1943-55, Secretary of Cabinet 1946-55, and Head of Defence Secretariat 1949-55. He set up the Cabinet Secretariat, and was known as "Foss the Boss."

In 1953, Shanahan was awarded the Queen Elizabeth II Coronation Medal.

He served as Commissioner then High Commissioner to Singapore (also to Malaya and Ambassador to Thailand) 1955-58, then as High Commissioner to Canada 1958-61 and Permanent Representative to the United Nations in New York 1958-62. In the 1962 Queen's Birthday Honours, Shanahan was appointed a Companion of the Order of St Michael and St George.

He died (of a brain tumour) on 13 September 1964 in Wellington.

== Personal life ==
He married Joan Katherine McCormick (or Joan Mason) on 18 April 1938; they had four sons and one daughter.

Diplomatic posts
Preceded by Leslie Munro	Permanent Representative to the United Nations in New York; 1958–1962	Succeeded by Frank Corner
