= Bryce Harland =

New Zealand diplomat and academic (1931–2006)

William Bryce Harland QSO (11 December 1931 – 1 February 2006) was a New Zealand diplomat and academic, who served as New Zealand's first Ambassador to China, Permanent Representative to the United Nations in New York, and High Commissioner to London.

== Biography ==
Harland was born in Wellington in 1931, and attended Victoria University of Wellington, where he received an MA (First Class) in History under the guidance of New Zealand historian J.C. Beaglehole in 1955, and at the Fletcher School of Law and Diplomacy in Boston, where he received an AM.

Harland was a highly regarded strategic thinker, who rose quickly through the ranks in the Ministry of Foreign Affairs. In 1973, Harland was appointed New Zealand's first Ambassador to China, where he was responsible for opening up diplomatic relations with that country. Harland has written of the period that until then, New Zealand's best-known connection with China was Rewi Alley. Harland worked alongside other Western diplomats, including then-US representative in Peking, George H. W. Bush, who described Harland as very pushy to extract as much information as the United States had on China at that time, despite liking him personally.

In 1976, Harland returned to New Zealand as Assistant Secretary of Foreign Affairs, before taking up the post of Permanent Representative to the United Nations in New York in 1982. In 1985, Harland became New Zealand's first professional diplomat to take up the post of High Commissioner to London, which he held until his retirement from the diplomatic service in 1991.

Harland then served as Director of the New Zealand Institute of International Affairs, making a very substantial contribution to research on New Zealand's relationship with Asia. He was also a visiting fellow at Oxford and Cambridge Universities.

In 1990, Harland was awarded the New Zealand 1990 Commemoration Medal. In the 1992 New Year Honours, he was appointed a Companion of the Queen's Service Order for public services.

Harland was regarded as a difficult personality to work for, but a brilliant strategic thinker.

Harland was married twice, and had four sons, three of whom survived him.

Diplomatic posts
Preceded by Tim Francis	Permanent Representative to the United Nations in New York; 1982–1985	Succeeded by David McDowell
Preceded by Joe Walding	High Commissioner of New Zealand to the United Kingdom; 1985–1991	Succeeded by George Gair
