= Fred de Malmanche =

New Zealand politician (1900–1988)

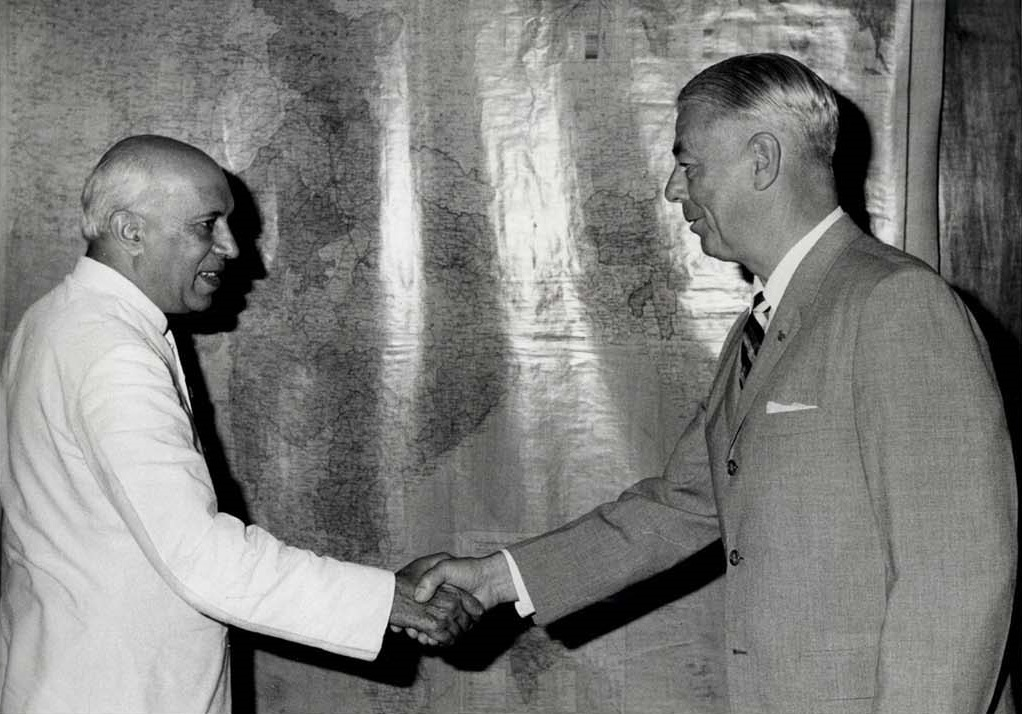
de Malmanche (right) meeting Jawaharlal Nehru (left) in March 1963

Frederick Henry Thomson de Malmanche (15 March 1900 – 1988) was a politician and diplomat.

== Biography ==
Descending from the first French settlers in Akaroa in 1840, de Malmanche was born in Christchurch and later lived in Dunedin and Wellington as an employee of Charles Haines Advertising Limited. In 1930, he moved to Auckland, where he became the company's managing director. He was married to Olive Lolo Gaudin. He had been president of the Association of Advertising Agencies of New Zealand and president of the Auckland Rotary Club.

In 1959, he stood on the Citizens & Ratepayers (C&R) ticket for the Auckland City Council and was elected a member. He was re-elected in 1962 and held a seat on the council for four years before he resigned in 1963. His resignation instigated a by-election to the council.

In 1962, de Malmanche was part of a group of C&R councillors (alongside Charlie Passmore and Reg Savory) who had persuaded the president of the Auckland Chamber of Commerce Edgar Faber to run for the Auckland mayoralty against Dove-Myer Robinson. They convinced him to do so by telling him exaggerated stories of Robinson's personal conduct and his behaviour during council business. Faber began to regret being involved in the mayoral contest as it began to affect his health and planned to withdraw from the race, but de Malmanche and the other C&R councillors insisted he continue. Shortly after the election Faber discovered he was dying of cancer and confided to Robinson that the C&R trio had used him against Robinson for "purely mercenary ends".

In 1963, de Malmanche was appointed by the Second National Government as New Zealand's Resident High Commissioner to India. He held the post until 1965.

He died in Auckland in 1988, aged 88.

== Notes ==
Diplomatic posts
Preceded by Guy Powles	Resident High Commissioner to India; 1963–1965	Succeeded by James Esmond Farrell
