= Lloyd White (diplomat) =

New Zealand diplomat and public servant

George David Lloyd White MVO (21 March 1918 – 19 February 1981) was a New Zealand diplomat and public servant, who served as New Zealand's ambassador to the United States from 1972 to 1978.

== Biography ==
Born in Nelson, New Zealand in 1918, White was educated at Timaru Boys' High School from 1930 to 1935. He then attended Canterbury University College, graduating Master of Arts with first-class honours in economics in 1941. His thesis was on New Zealand monetary policy. He served with the 2nd NZEF from 1941 to 1945, and was commissioned as a second lieutenant in 1943.

White joined the New Zealand public service in 1945, posted to the Economic Stabilisation Commission. He joined the Department of External Affairs in 1949, and had diplomatic postings to London—where he was economic counsellor at the New Zealand High Commission from 1954 to 1955 and deputy high commissioner from 1961 to 1964—and to Washington, where he was chargé d'affaires from 1958 to 1961 and ambassador from 1972 to 1978. Domestically he served as deputy secretary of foreign affairs between 1964 and 1972. Following his retirement in 1978, White was chief executive of the Queen Elizabeth II National Trust.

In 1957, White was appointed a Member of the Royal Victorian Order. He died in Lower Hutt in 1981 and was buried at Akatarawa Cemetery.

Diplomatic posts
Preceded by Leslie Munro as Minister in the United States	Chargé d'Affaires in the United States; 1958–1961	Succeeded by George Laking as Ambassador to the United States
Preceded by Frank Corner	Ambassador to the United States; 1972–1978	Succeeded by Merwyn Norrish
