= Roy Ferguson =

New Zealand diplomat

Roy Ferguson QSO
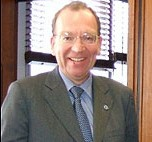
- Ferguson, c. 2007

New Zealand Ambassador to the United States
- In office 2006–2010
- Preceded by: John Wood
- Succeeded by: Mike Moore

New Zealand Ambassador to South Korea
- In office 1999–2002

New Zealand Ambassador to North Korea
- In office 1999–2002

Personal details
- Education: University of Canterbury; University of Pennsylvania

Roy Neil Ferguson, QSO, is the former New Zealand Ambassador to the United States. He was replaced by former New Zealand Prime Minister and Director-General of the World Trade Organization Mike Moore in 2010. Ferguson replaced John Wood in the role in 2006. He was Director of the Americas Division in the Ministry of Foreign Affairs and Trade from 2002 to 2005 and has served on the Boards of the New Zealand-United States Council, Fulbright New Zealand, the Ian Axford Fellowships, and the New Zealand Centre for Latin American Studies. Ferguson previously served in Washington as Deputy Chief of Mission between 1991 and 1995. From 1999 to 2002 he served as the New Zealand Ambassador to South Korea and concurrently served as Ambassador to North Korea from 2001. He has also served in Manila and Canberra.

Ferguson received an MA in History and Political Science from the University of Canterbury and was awarded both the Canterbury Fellowship and a Fulbright Travel Grant which enabled him to study at the University of Pennsylvania, from which he graduated with an MA in International Relations. He attended the six-week Advanced Management Program at Harvard Business School.

After his stint as Ambassador to the United States of America, Ferguson was Director, Intelligence Coordination Group, Department of the Prime Minister and Cabinet.

== Honours ==
In the 2014 Queen's Birthday Honours, Ferguson was appointed a Companion of the Queen's Service Order, for services to the State.

== See also ==
- Embassy of New Zealand in Washington
- List of ambassadors of New Zealand to the United States

Diplomatic posts
Preceded by John Wood	Ambassador of New Zealand to the United States; 2006–2010	Succeeded by Mike Moore
