= List of permanent representatives of New Zealand to the United Nations in Vienna =

The permanent representative of New Zealand to the United Nations in Vienna is New Zealand's foremost diplomatic representative at the offices of the United Nations in Vienna, and in charge of New Zealand's diplomatic mission to the United Nations in Vienna.

The Permanent Delegation is located at New Zealand's consulate-general in Vienna. New Zealand has maintained a resident Permanent Representative to the UN in Vienna since 1982. Until 1991, the Permanent Representative was concurrently accredited as the Ambassador to Austria. However, with the closing of the bilateral mission in that year, and its transfer to Bonn, in Germany, the position of Permanent Representative was separated.

== Permanent representatives to the United Nations in Vienna ==
- Hugo Judd (1982–85)
- Don Walker (1985–90)
- Barry Brooks (1990–93)
- Alan Cook (1993–97)
- Joan Mosley (1997–2003)
- Barbara Bridge (2003–06)
- Jennifer Macmillan (2006–11)
- Philip Griffiths (2011–13)
- Deborah Geels (2013–2017)
- Nicole Roberton (2017–2021)
- Brian Hewson (2021–2022)
- Dell Higgie (2022–present)

== See also ==
- List of permanent representatives of New Zealand to the United Nations in Geneva
- List of permanent representatives of New Zealand to the United Nations in New York
