= James Esmond Farrell =

New Zealand Diplomat (1909-1968)

James Esmond Farrell (14 October 1909 – 1 September 1968) was a New Zealand diplomat.

== Biography ==
Farrell was born in Ashburton on 14 October 1909. He was educated at St Thomas's Academy, Oamaru and Sacred Heart College in Auckland. In 1935, he married Mercia Taylor, with whom he had three sons and a daughter

He was a member of the Oamaru Trotting Club executive from 1931 to 1965 and was for 12 years president of the club and later vice-president of the New Zealand Trotting Conference. He also served for several years as a member of the Totalisator Agency Board. In World War II, Farrell served in the Royal New Zealand Air Force.

He attended the University of Canterbury, where he graduated with a Bachelor of Laws in 1945. At university, he was nominated for a Rhodes Scholarship. Farrell was a barrister and solicitor and the senior partner in the legal firm of Hjorring, Tait and Farrell. He was also a contributor to the Law Journal.

Farrell studied international affairs at several European and American-based organisations and lectured extensively on the subject. He was also a radio speaker on European and Commonwealth affairs. Farrell was the president of the Oamaru branch of the Royal Over-Seas League and an associate member of the British Atlantic Committee and the British Society for International Understanding.

Farrell was the Oamaru electorate president of the National Party. Farrell was also a member of the National Party's Dominion Council. He had sought the National nomination for Oamaru at the 1946 election but was unsuccessful.

In 1965, the Second National Government appointed Farrell as New Zealand's Resident High Commissioner to India. He held the post until 1968.

He died in Oamaru on 1 September 1968. His wife and four children survived him.

== Notes ==
Diplomatic posts
Preceded by Fred de Malmanche	Resident High Commissioner to India; 1965–1968	Succeeded by Brian Lendrum
