= Susan McCormack =

New Zealand lawyer and university administrator

Susan McCormack is a New Zealand lawyer and former chancellor of the University of Canterbury, Christchurch, New Zealand.

== Biography ==
In 1994, McCormack and Fiona Wakefield founded the first female law firm in Christchurch. In 2003 the firm merged with Simon Mortlock Partners to become Mortlock McCormack Law. McCormack specialised in commercial and corporate law and had a key role in the development of the central city project The Terrace following the 2010–2011 Canterbury earthquakes.

In 2013 she was appointed pro-chancellor of the University of Canterbury, and in 2019 she left Mortlock McCormack after taking up the position of chancellor.

McCormack has also held a number of directorships, including Lyttelton Port Company from 1998 to 2007, the New Zealand Symphony Orchestra from 2003 to 2008, KiwiRail and she is a board member of Public Trust. She is also a member of the New Zealand Law Society and the Institute of Directors in New Zealand.

Academic offices
Preceded by John Wood	Chancellor of the University of Canterbury; 2019–2022	Succeeded by Amy Adams
