= Ian Templeton =

New Zealand journalist

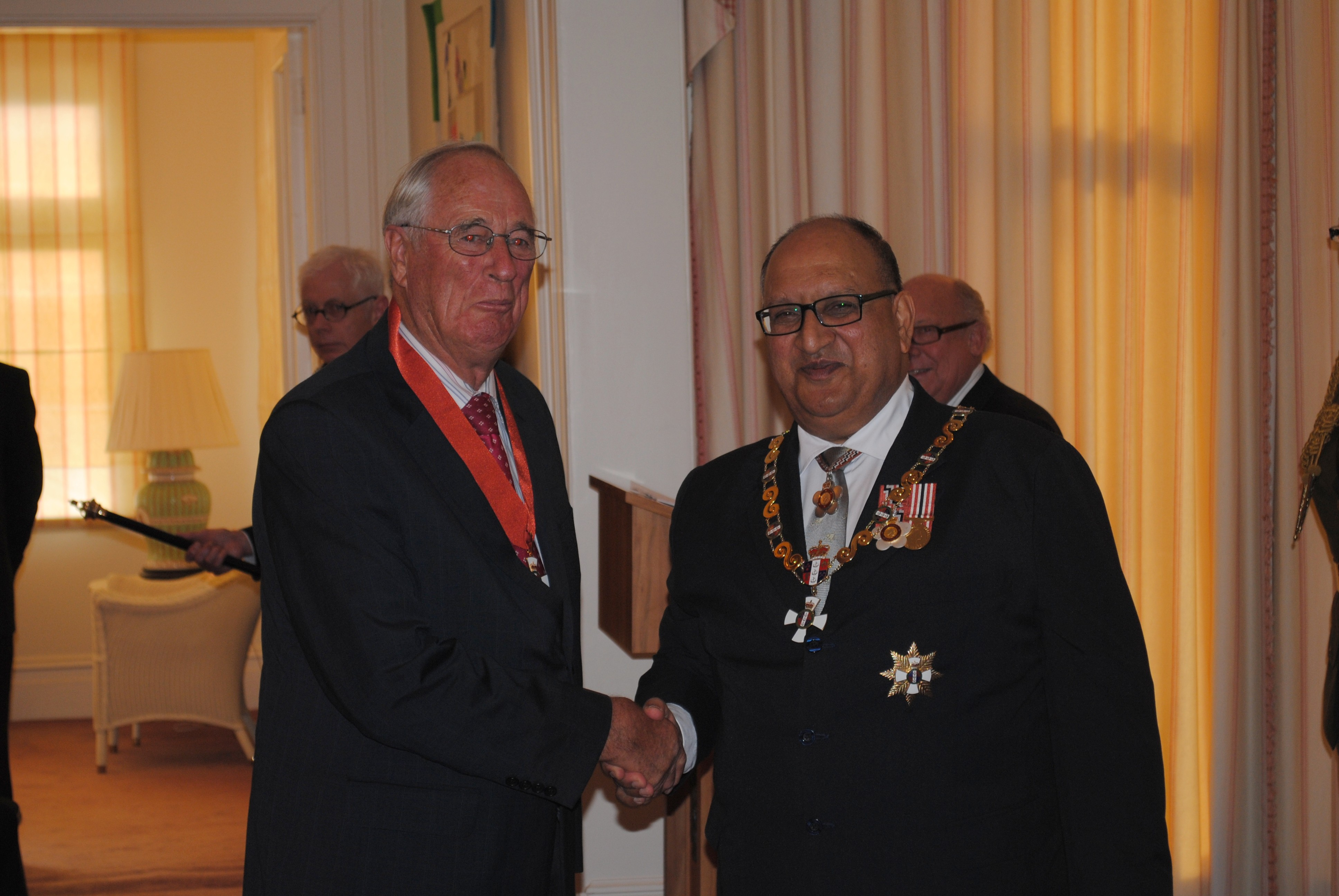
Templeton (left), after his investiture as a Companion of the New Zealand Order of Merit by the governor-general, Sir Anand Satyanand, in 2011

Ian Campbell Templeton CNZM OBE (born 24 March 1929) is a veteran New Zealand political reporter who celebrated 50 years of reporting the New Zealand Parliament from the press gallery in 2007. He has written several books on politics. He was the only print journalist to get a weekly one-on-one briefing with Prime Minister Helen Clark.

He was educated at King's High School, Dunedin, and completed an economics degree at the University of Otago. After university he was a general reporter for two years at the Otago Daily Times.

His twin brother Hugh was a former diplomat, public servant and politician, and their brother Malcolm was a diplomat, public servant and author.

Templeton was appointed an Officer of the Order of the British Empire in the 1994 New Year Honours, and a Companion of the New Zealand Order of Merit in the 2010 New Year Honours, both for services to journalism.

In May 2011 he was conferred an honorary doctorate by Massey University.
