= Charles Guy Powles =

New Zealand military officer

- Born: 15 December 1872; Wellington, New Zealand
- Died: 17 June 1951 (aged 78); Te Horo, New Zealand
- Relatives: Guy Powles (son)
- Military career
- Allegiance: New Zealand
- Branch: New Zealand Military Forces
- Rank: Colonel
- Conflicts: Second Boer War; First World War; Gallipoli campaign; Sinai and Palestine campaign; Western Front; Second World War; Home Front
- Awards: Companion of the Order of St Michael and St George; Distinguished Service Order; Mention in Despatches (4); Order of the Nile, 3rd Class (Egypt)
- Other work: Military historian

Charles Guy Powles, CMG DSO (15 December 1872 – 17 June 1951) was an officer in the New Zealand Military Forces who served in the Second Boer War and the First World War.

Born in Wellington, Powles volunteered for the Fourth Contingent to fight in the Second Boer War, serving in Africa from April 1900 to June 1901. Afterwards he farmed but joined the New Zealand Military Forces in 1910 and served in the Staff Corps. On the outbreak of the First World War, he was appointed brigade major of the New Zealand Mounted Rifles Brigade. He was involved in the campaign in Gallipoli, for which he was awarded the Distinguished Service Order. From 1916 to mid-1918 he served in the Middle East as assistant adjutant and quartermaster general of the Australian and New Zealand Mounted Division. During this time he was appointed a Companion of the Order of St Michael and St George.

In the postwar period he resumed his career with New Zealand Military Forces, serving in instructing and staff posts before retiring in 1927 as commander of the Central Military District. He was the principal of Flock House in civilian life but was recalled to military service during the Second World War to command Waiouru Military Camp. He died in Te Horo, aged 78.

== Early life ==
Born on 15 December 1872 in Wellington, New Zealand, Charles Guy Powles was the son of C. P. Powles, a long time member of the Wellington College board of governors. Once Powles completed his schooling, he took up farming. He had an interest in the military, having served for a number of years in the Wellington College Cadets.

== South Africa ==
Powles volunteered to join the Fourth Contingent raised for service in the Boer South African Republic. As a non-commissioned officer, he and the rest of the contingent, nicknamed the "Rough Riders", left New Zealand in March 1900 and landed in Portuguese East Africa the following month. The contingent were deployed as part of the Rhodesian Field Force around Mafeking. Aside from a brief action at Ottoshoop in August, the Rough Riders spent the majority of their war service in the Transvaal, carrying out reconnaissance patrols and pursuing Boer commandos. As part of the effort to deprive the Boers of resources, they also helped to destroy crops and round up civilians and cattle, during which they occasionally skirmished with armed commandos. In June 1901 the "Rough Riders" returned to New Zealand. By this time Powles was a lieutenant, having been commissioned the previous November.

== Military career ==
After his return from South Africa, Powles went back to farming. However he sought a career as a professional soldier and in 1910 joined the New Zealand Military Forces. After training at Trentham Military Camp, he was posted as a lieutenant to the newly formed Staff Corps. He served as the adjutant of the 6th (Manawatu) Mounted Rifles, of the Territorial Force, from July 1911. Two years later he became the commander of No. 5 (Wellington) Group and was still serving in this capacity at the time of the outbreak of the First World War in August 1914.

== First World War ==
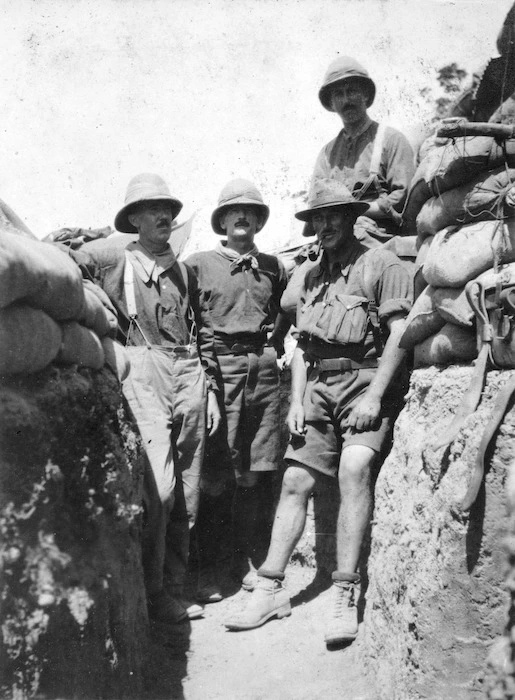
A group of New Zealand officers at Gallipoli in 1915; Powles stands in the centre

Powles was seconded to the New Zealand Expeditionary Force (NZEF), raised for service in the war, and, holding the rank of captain, was appointed as the brigade major of the New Zealand Mounted Rifles Brigade. This brigade departed New Zealand with the main body of the NZEF in mid-October 1914, destined for the Middle East. Once they had arrived at Alexandria, in Egypt, in December 1914, the troops of the NZEF expected to continue onto Europe after a period of training.

However, in early April 1915, military planners in London decided that the NZEF would be part of the Allied forces that would open up a new front in the Middle East, by landing on the Gallipoli Peninsula. It was not until May that Powles's brigade was landed, sans horses, at Gallipoli. Powles would serve throughout the campaign at Gallipoli and in its final stages was commander of the Canterbury Mounted Rifles Regiment. For his services at Gallipoli he was awarded the Distinguished Service Order as well as being twice mentioned in despatches.

In early 1916, as part of the reorganisation of the NZEF that followed the Allied evacuation from Gallipoli, the Australian and New Zealand Mounted Division was formed with Powles, promoted to acting lieutenant colonel, appointed assistant adjutant and quartermaster general. He would serve with the division for the next two years as it campaigned in the Sinai Desert and into Palestine. He was made a Companion of the Order of St Michael and St George in April 1918, the citation noting it was in recognition of his services during the operations to capture Jerusalem. He had already been mentioned twice in despatches earlier in the Sinai and Palestinian campaign and was later awarded the Egyptian Order of the Nile, 3rd Class.

In June Powles was sent to Europe, where he was seconded to the British 61st Division, serving with it until the end of the war. He returned to New Zealand in March 1919. He was followed by his horse Bess, which had been his mount throughout the campaign in the Middle East; she was one of only four horses to return to New Zealand out of the ten thousand that departed the country during the war.

== Postwar period ==
Resuming his career with the New Zealand Staff Corps, Powles was based at Trentham Military Camp initially as second-in-command of the instructing facilities there and then as commandant of the camp itself. Over the next few years, he worked on an official history of the Sinai and Palestine campaign. This was based on a draft originally prepared by Major A. H. Wilkie, another veteran of the fighting in the Middle East, and was published in 1922 as The New Zealanders in Sinai and Palestine. This work, which was favourably reviewed, became the primary reference for New Zealand's contribution to the campaign in the Middle East for the next several decades.

In April 1922 Powles went to Wellington to serve as a staff officer on the headquarters of the New Zealand Military Forces. The following year he was appointed chief of staff to Major General Edward Chaytor, holding the rank of colonel. His final post before his retirement in December 1927 was as commander of the Central Military District.

== Later life ==
Returning to civilian life, Powles became the principal of the agricultural college at Flock House in Bulls. He took his horse Bess with him and when she died in 1934, Powles erected a memorial for her nearby Flock House and this subsequently came to informally be seen as a tribute to all of New Zealand's war horses. During the Second World War he was recalled to duty and served as the commandant of Waiouru Military Camp from 1941 until the cessation of hostilities. He then returned to civilian life. Powles died at Te Horo near Wellington on 17 March 1951. His son, Guy Powles, was a diplomat and in 1962 became New Zealand's first ombudsman.

== Publications ==
- The New Zealanders in Sinai and Palestine – Lieut.-Colonel. C. Guy Powles (1922)
