= Flock House =

Coordinates: 40.2650°S 175.2879°E

Flock House was an agricultural and farm training school in Bulls, Rangitikei District, New Zealand from 1924 until 1987.

From 1924 to 1937 children of British seamen that had been killed or wounded during World War I were brought over, trained at Flock House, and placed on farms in New Zealand, to start a new life. From 1937 to 1987 New Zealand nationals were trained at the school.

The complex was used by private owners since 1987 as a conference facility.

== The building ==
Flock House is located at 1427 Parewanui Road, Parewanui, 14 km out of Bulls. The homestead was built by Russell & Bignell Ltd. in 1908, as a three-storey residence for Lyn McKelvie, and is now under Heritage New Zealand. The building has an L-shaped plan, and early elements of the Arts and Crafts style that became popular in New Zealand in the 1930s. McKelvie was the owner of an estate of over 3,000 acres (12 km^{2}). The property, including the Homestead, was sold in 1923 to the Fund, that would use it as an agricultural training farm from then on.

Nearby is a memorial to Bess, a war horse that had been sent overseas at the start of the First World War. One of the four horses that eventually returned New Zealand out of the 10,000 that were sent overseas, she was the mount of a former principal of the training school, Colonel Charles Guy Powles. When she died in 1934, Powles erected a memorial for her near by Flock House and this subsequently came to informally be seen as a tribute to all of New Zealand's war horses. The memorial is registered with Heritage New Zealand as a Category 1 Historic Place.

== History of the school ==
Following the First World War, Edward Newman, Member of Parliament for Rangitikei, proposed that sheep farmers in New Zealand should acknowledge a "debt" to the British Royal and Mercantile Navy. These seamen had kept the shipping lanes open enabling New Zealand's wool-clip to be sent to England. The New Zealand Farmers Union established the "New Zealand Sheep Owners Acknowledgement of Debt to British Seamen Fund", from farmers' wool-clip earnings and from 1921 funds were distributed to dependents in England.

By 1924, the Fund purchased Flock House Farm in Bulls, Rangitikei, with the intention of bringing dependents to New Zealand, teaching them the basics of farming at Flock House, then placing them on farms around New Zealand. Between 1924 and 1937 a total of over 600 dependents were brought over, trained and placed on farms.

In 1937 the Government negotiated the purchase of the farm and re-focused training towards New Zealand nationals.

From 1969 to 1983, the principal of Flock House was JJ Stewart, also noted as a rugby union coach.

In 1988 the facility was closed. By that time, more than 3,000 students had been successfully trained.

In early 2010 the site was used to host Camp A Low Hum, an alternative music festival over Wellington Anniversary Weekend.
