= Helen Hampton =

New Zealand diplomat (1921–1971)

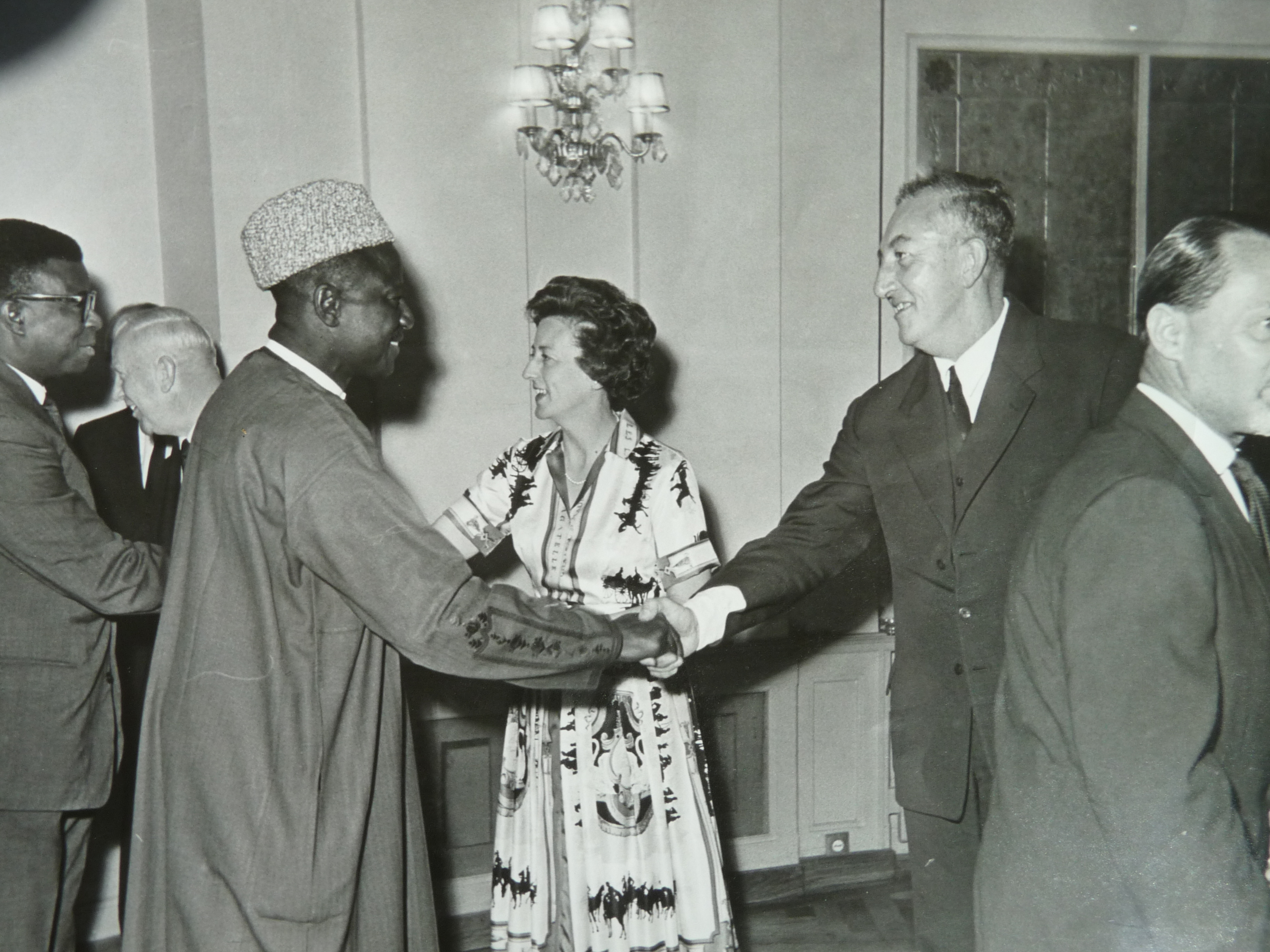
Hampton introducing other WHO delegates to the New Zealand Director General of Health Dr Doug Kennedy (c 1970).

Helen Noelene Hampton (1921 – February 1971) was a New Zealand diplomat who was only the second female in history to have served as a Permanent Representative to the UN in Geneva. The first was Swedish ambassador Inga Thorsson who had taken up her post in 1966. Through her appointment as Permanent Representative Hampton became also the first female New Zealand diplomat to hold the rank of Ambassador.

== Biography ==
Hampton was born in 1921 as the only child of James Henry Hampton and Doris Hampton. She attended Victoria University College (now Victoria University of Wellington) and graduated in 1946 with a BA in economics.

She joined the newly formed External Affairs Department in 1945 and upon graduation was posted to New York as a member of the New Zealand delegation to the United Nations. Subsequent postings took her to Canberra, London and Ottawa before her appointment as Permanent Representative to the European Office of the UN in Geneva in 1968.

== See also ==
- List of ambassadors of New Zealand
