= Leslie Munro =

New Zealand politician (1901–1974)

Sir Leslie Munro KCMG KCVO
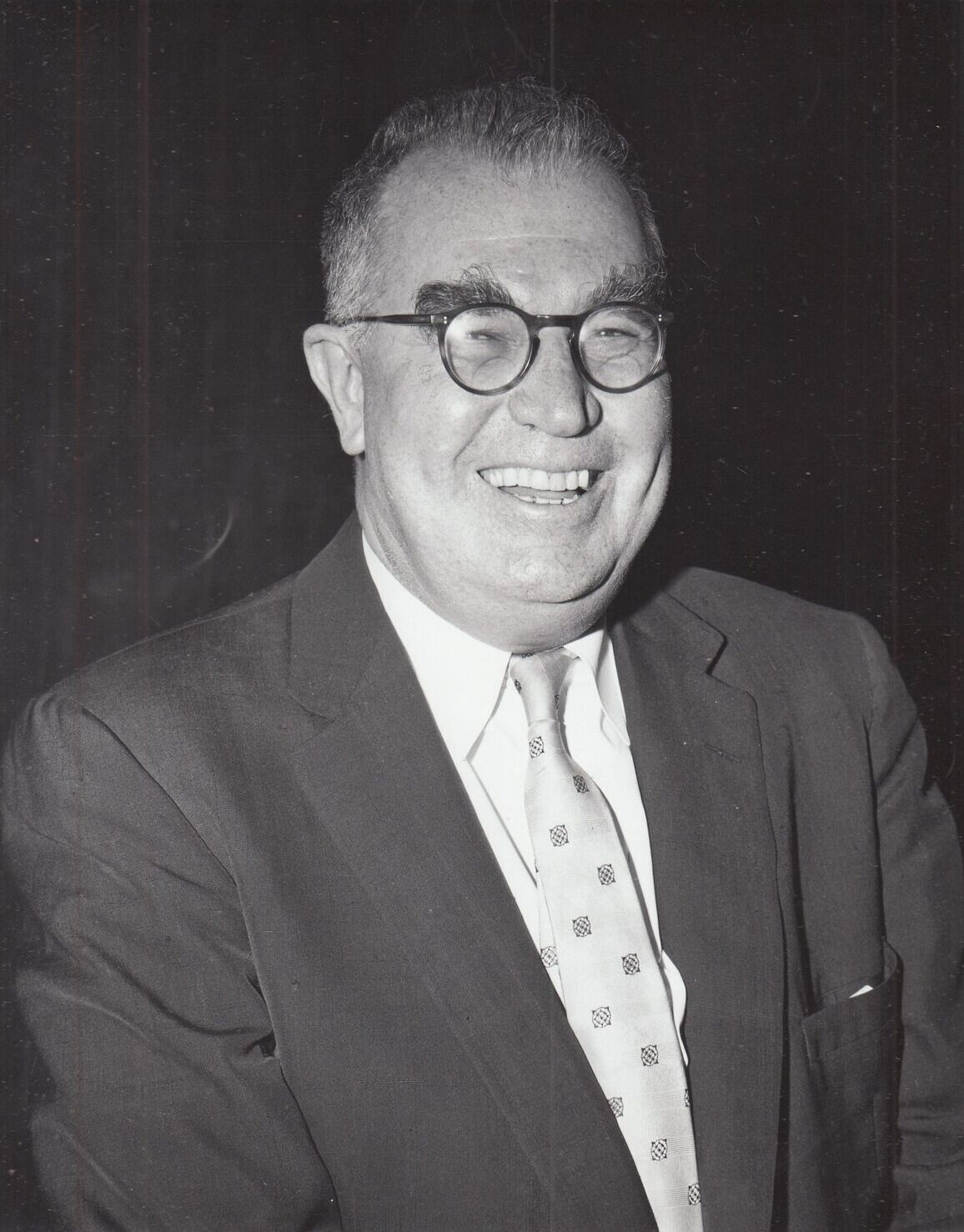
- Munro, c. 1957

Member of the New Zealand Parliament for Hamilton West
- In office 1969–1972
- Succeeded by: Dorothy Jelicich

Member of the New Zealand Parliament for Waipa
- In office 1963–1969
- Preceded by: Hallyburton Johnstone

14th President of the United Nations General Assembly
- In office 17 September 1957 – 16 September 1958
- Preceded by: Wan Waithayakon
- Succeeded by: Charles Habib Malik

3rd Minister from New Zealand in the United States
- In office 1952–1958
- Preceded by: Sir Carl Berendsen
- Succeeded by: Lloyd White (as Chargé d'Affaires)

Personal details
- Born: Leslie Knox Munro; 26 February 1901 Auckland, New Zealand
- Died: 13 February 1974 (aged 72) Hamilton, New Zealand
- Party: National
- Spouse(s): Christine Priestley (m. 1927); Muriel Sturt (m. 1931)

Sir Leslie Knox Munro KCMG KCVO (26 February 1901 – 13 February 1974) was a New Zealand lawyer, journalist, diplomat and politician.

== Law and media ==
Munro studied at Auckland Grammar School and the University of Auckland, where he graduated with a Master of Laws in 1923. He became dean of the law faculty at the University of Auckland in 1938, and taught and administrated at the university in a variety of roles until 1951. Munro was also president of the Auckland District Law Society from 1936 to 1938. Munro gave radio talks on world events for the New Zealand National Broadcasting Service (NBS), and wrote for The New Zealand Herald, where he was editor from 1942 to 1951.

== Diplomatic career ==
Munro interviewed on CBS-TV's Longines Chronoscope (1954)

Munro was a founding member of the New Zealand National Party, and held significant executive positions in the party, helping it to victory in the 1949 general election. In 1952 the new prime minister, Sidney Holland, appointed Munro the New Zealand ambassador to the United States, and the permanent representative of New Zealand to the United Nations. In that capacity, he lobbied for the New Zealand government to support efforts by the United States to increase its involvement in Indochina in response to the success of the Viet Minh during the First Indochina War. While he came to recognise the Viet Cong as an indigenous movement, he still contended that it was supported by North Vietnam and the People's Republic of China as part of a campaign of Communist subversion against South Vietnam. As New Zealand's permanent representative to the UN, he served as president of the Trusteeship Council from 1953 to 1954 and President of the United Nations General Assembly for its twelfth session (1957–1958). He was also three times President of the Security Council, and was serving in that position at the outbreak of Suez Crisis in 1956. At the UN he was an outspoken critic of the Soviet response to the 1956 Hungarian Revolution, and was appointed the special representative for the 'Hungarian question'.

In 1953, Munro was awarded the Queen Elizabeth II Coronation Medal. He was knighted in 1955 with a KCMG, followed by a KCVO in 1957. Although he was removed from his position as permanent representative in 1958 by the second Labour government he remained a special representative until 1962, and was also secretary-general of the International Commission of Jurists from 1961. He wrote the widely read United Nations:Hope for a divided world in 1960. For the academic year 1960–1961, he was a Fellow on the faculty in the Center for Advanced Study at Wesleyan University, Middletown, Connecticut.

== National politics ==
New Zealand Parliament
Years	Term	Electorate	Party
1963–1966	34th	Waipa	National
1966–1969	35th	Waipa	National
1969–1972	36th	Hamilton West	National

At the end of Munro's appointment to Washington he had been replaced by a career diplomat. After the 1960 New Zealand election Munro expected the new National government to either reappoint him to Washington or to give him the post of High Commissioner to London. His personal traits had however made him unpopular amongst the senior officials of the Prime Minister's Department and External Affairs. A recommendation was made to the new prime minister Keith Holyoake that Munro not be reappointed to an overseas diplomatic position.

By this time Munro was seeking to become a National Party Member of Parliament. He had previously proposed to stand for Tamaki in 1960 but only if he was unopposed for the party selection. Robert Muldoon, a future prime minister who had stood for National in safe Labour seats in the previous two elections, also went for selection despite the request of the National Party president Alex McKenzie to stand aside for Munro. Muldoon won the selection, and won the seat from Labour's Bob Tizard.

Munro returned to New Zealand from Washington and was selected to run in Waipa, where he was elected in 1963 and 1966. After boundary changes, he stood successfully for Hamilton West in 1969. The National Party was in Government for all of those years. However, personal and professional antagonisms with successive prime ministers Keith Holyoake and John Marshall prevented him from attaining high rank in those administrations. Holyoake usually kept him from speaking in caucus until the end of the debate, when the conclusion had been decided. Munro retired in 1972, and as of 2020 is the only former Hamilton West MP who left that office without being defeated.

== Private life ==
Munro was married twice, and had a daughter from each marriage. His first marriage, to Christine Priestley, lasted for two years, as it was cut short by her death in 1929 three days after the birth of their daughter. Munro's second marriage, to Muriel Sturt in 1931, was to last until his death in Hamilton in 1974.

== Notes ==
Diplomatic posts
Preceded by Wan Waithayakon	President of the United Nations General Assembly; 1957–1958	Succeeded by Charles Habib Malik
Preceded by Sir Carl Berendsen	Permanent Representative to the United Nations in New York; 1952–1958	Succeeded by Foss Shanahan
Preceded by Sir Carl Berendsen	Minister from New Zealand in the United States; 1952–1958	Succeeded by Lloyd White as Chargé d'Affaires
New Zealand Parliament
Preceded by Hallyburton Johnstone	Member of Parliament for Waipa; 1963–1969	Vacant Constituency abolished, recreated in 1978 Title next held by Marilyn Waring
New constituency	Member of Parliament for Hamilton West; 1969–1972	Succeeded by Dorothy Jelicich
