= List of ambassadors of New Zealand to the United States =

Ambassador of New Zealand to the United States
- Coat of Arms of New Zealand

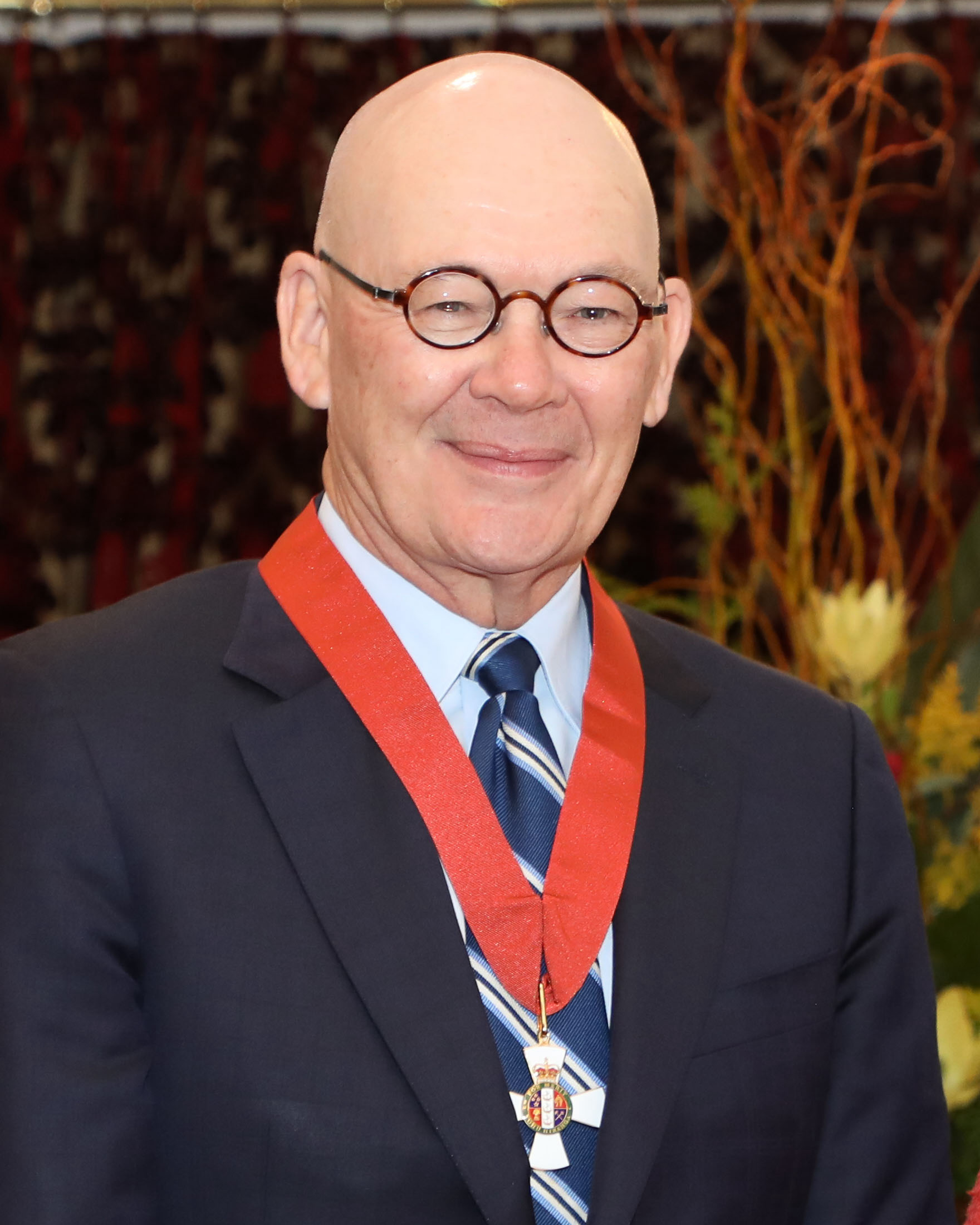
- Incumbent; Chris Seed since 18 February 2026
- Style: His Excellency
- Residence: Chancery
- Appointer: Governor-General of New Zealand
- Term length: At His Majesty's Pleasure
- Inaugural holder: Walter Nash
- Formation: 16 February 1942

The Ambassador from New Zealand to the United States is New Zealand's foremost diplomatic representative in the United States of America, and in charge of New Zealand's diplomatic mission in the United States.

The embassy is located in Washington, D.C., the United States' capital city. New Zealand has maintained a resident ambassador in the United States since 1961, and a resident Head of Mission since 1941.

== List of heads of mission ==
The following individuals have held the office:

No.	Name	Portrait	Term of office	
1	Walter Nash		18 November 1941	16 March 1944
2	Carl Berendsen		16 March 1944	31 January 1952
3	Leslie Munro		31 January 1952	16 September 1958
4	Lloyd White		16 September 1958	28 April 1961
5	George Laking		28 April 1961	14 June 1967
6	Frank Corner		14 June 1967	2 October 1972
(4)	Lloyd White		2 October 1972	7 April 1978
7	Merv Norrish		7 April 1978	29 August 1980
8	Frank Gill		29 August 1980	1 March 1982†
9	Lance Adams-Schneider		18 May 1982	5 March 1985
10	Bill Rowling		5 March 1985	20 February 1988
11	Tim Francis		20 February 1988	11 April 1991
12	Denis McLean		11 April 1991	23 June 1994
13	John Wood		23 June 1994	10 September 1998
14	Jim Bolger		10 September 1998	January 2002
(13)	John Wood		January 2002	2006
15	Roy Ferguson		2006	2010
16	Mike Moore		2010	16 December 2015
17	Tim Groser		2016	February 2018
18	Rosemary Banks		February 2018	August 2022
19	Bede Corry		September 2022	June 2024
(18)	Rosemary Banks		17 June 2024	18 February 2026
20	Chris Seed		18 February 2026	Incumbent
