= Merv Norrish =

New Zealand diplomat (1926–2021)

Merv Norrish CNZM
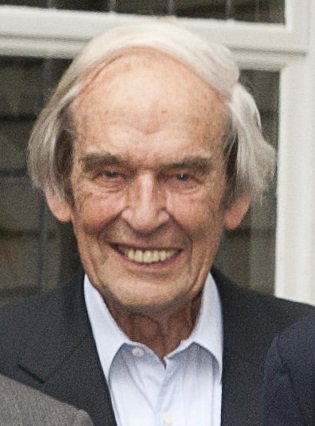
- Norrish in 2011

4th Secretary of Foreign Affairs
- In office May 1980 – 1 December 1988
- Preceded by: Frank Corner
- Succeeded by: Graham Ansell

7th New Zealand Ambassador to the United States
- In office 7 April 1978 – 29 August 1980
- Preceded by: Lloyd White
- Succeeded by: Frank Gill

High Commissioner from New Zealand to the United Kingdom Acting
- In office August 1972 – 15 March 1973
- Monarch: Elizabeth II
- Preceded by: Denis Blundell
- Succeeded by: Terry McCombs

Personal details
- Born: 28 October 1926 Ashburton, New Zealand
- Died: 21 May 2021 (aged 94) Wellington, New Zealand
- Spouse: Francoise Honoré
- Education: Canterbury University College
- Profession: Diplomat

Merwyn Norrish CNZM (28 October 1926 – 21 May 2021) was a New Zealand diplomat who served as New Zealand's ambassador to the European Community, acting high commissioner to London, ambassador to the United States, and secretary of Foreign Affairs.

== Early life ==
Born in Ashburton, Norrish was educated at Ashburton High School and Christchurch Boys' High School, before graduating from Canterbury University College with a Bachelor of Arts in 1948 and a Master of Arts with first-class honours in history in 1949.

== Professional career ==
Norrish joined the Department of External Affairs as a recruit in 1949, as one of the fledgling intake in Alister McIntosh's new department. Norrish spent his early diplomatic career in Wellington and Paris, with a posting to Paris from 1955 to 1958.

In 1961, Norrish was posted to New York City as New Zealand's deputy permanent representative to the United Nations.

Norrish was appointed New Zealand's ambassador to the European Community, in Brussels, in 1967. In 1972, he became acting high commissioner to London, before returning to Wellington as deputy secretary of Foreign Affairs in 1973. During his time as deputy secretary, he was considered to be more closely aligned to the United States' foreign policy position than his secretary, Frank Corner.

In 1978, Norrish became New Zealand's ambassador to the United States in Washington, D.C., and Mexico.

In 1980, Norrish was appointed New Zealand secretary of Foreign Affairs, a post he held until his retirement in 1989. During that period, Norrish was the key foreign policy official during New Zealand's withdrawal from ANZUS and the nuclear ship controversy. Norrish is understood to have warned Prime Minister David Lange not to antagonise British Prime Minister Margaret Thatcher by participating in the Oxford Union debate, and was responsible for implementing New Zealand's nuclear-free policy against his personal instincts. During his tenure, French secret agents bombed the Greenpeace ship Rainbow Warrior in 1985.

== Later life and death ==
In retirement, Norrish served as chairman of New Zealand On Air, and the France-New Zealand Friendship Fund. He died on 21 May 2021.

== Honours and awards ==
In 1997, Norrish received the Queen Elizabeth II Silver Jubilee Medal, and in 1990 was awarded the New Zealand 1990 Commemoration Medal.

In the 2002 Queen's Birthday and Golden Jubilee Honours, Norrish was appointed a Companion of the New Zealand Order of Merit, for public services.

== Personal life ==
In 1949 he married Francoise Honoré, a Frenchwoman whom he had met at university. For leisure, he enjoyed playing croquet and Scrabble.

== Notes ==
Diplomatic posts
Preceded by Lloyd White	Ambassador to the United States; 1978–1980	Succeeded by Frank Gill
Preceded by Denis Blundell	High Commissioner from New Zealand to the United Kingdom; 1972–1973	Succeeded by Terry McCombs
