= Carl Berendsen =

New Zealand civil servant

Sir Carl Berendsen KCMG
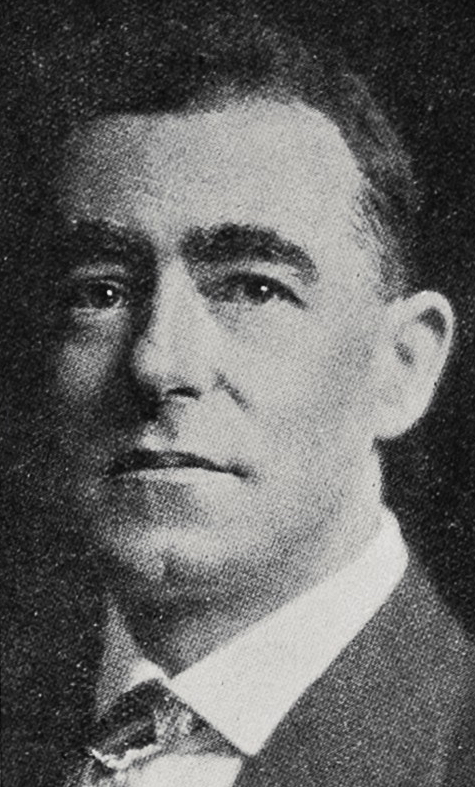
- Berendsen, c. 1928

Personal information
- Full name: Carl August Berendsen
- Born: 16 August 1890; Sydney, New South Wales, Australia
- Died: 12 September 1973 (aged 83); Dunedin, New Zealand
- Role: Wicket-keeper

Domestic team information
- Years: Team
- 1911/12: Wellington

Career statistics
Competition	First-class
Matches	4
Runs scored	19
Batting average	3.16
100s/50s	0/0
Top score	8*
Catches/stumpings	7/–
- Source: Cricinfo, 26 November 2008

Sir Carl August Berendsen KCMG (16 August 1890 – 12 September 1973) was a New Zealand civil servant and diplomat. After being in the Education and Labour Departments he joined the Prime Minister's Department in 1926, becoming its head in 1935. He was the creator of the Department of External Affairs, and collaborated with Michael Joseph Savage and Peter Fraser. He was Secretary for External Affairs 1928–32, Head of the Prime Minister's Department 1932–43, and Secretary of the War Cabinet 1939–43. He attended all Imperial Conferences 1926–43, and assemblies of the League of Nations and later the United Nations.

Berendsen served as the country's first High Commissioner to Australia, from 1943 until 1944; this was to improve relations with Australia (John Curtin) and for health reasons because of Fraser's notoriously disorganised work habits. He was then transferred to Washington, D.C., where he served as Minister to the United States between 1944 and 1952 (and, in this role, signed the ANZUS Treaty on behalf of New Zealand). In late 1967 he was appointed as member of the team headed by UN envoy Gunnar Jarring to establish peace in the Middle East following the Six-Day War.

He was born in Sydney, Australia, and educated (LLM) at Victoria University College. Berendsen served with New Zealand forces in Samoa in World War I, and from 1917 to 1919 after being called up in Trentham Camp and Sling Camp, England; then in the High Commission in London for the 1919 election and licensing polls.

In 1935, Berendsen was awarded the King George V Silver Jubilee Medal. He was appointed a Companion of the Order of St Michael and St George in the 1936 King's Birthday Honours, and was promoted to Knight Commander of the same order in the 1946 New Year Honours. In 1953, he was awarded the Queen Elizabeth II Coronation Medal.

Berendsen married Nellie Ellis Brown at St John's Church, Wellington on 15 December 1917. They had two sons.

He was a cricketer who played four first-class matches for Wellington, and also played rugby.

Diplomatic posts
Preceded by New position	High Commissioner to Australia; 1943–1944	Succeeded by Jim Barclay
Preceded by Walter Nash	Minister from New Zealand in the United States; 1944–1952	Succeeded by Leslie Munro
New title	Permanent Representative to the United Nations in New York; 1949–1952	Succeeded by Leslie Munro
