= David Dickens =

New Zealand defence strategist

David Dickens is a former New Zealand defence strategist. He was deputy director (1996-1999) and then director (1999-2002) of the Centre for Strategic Studies: New Zealand.

== Overview ==
Dickens (Born in Eketahuna, 1963), educated St Joseph's College and Chanel College Masterton, is a former soldier with the 7th Wellington and Hawkes Bay Regiment, and 2nd/1st Battalion of the Royal New Zealand Infantry Regiment, and was a Ministry of Defence official (1990-1996). He is a graduate of the Royal New Zealand Air Force Senior Command and Staff College Course (1993), and has BA with First Class Honours (1989) and PhD (1996) degrees from the Victoria University of Wellington. His thesis was New Zealand and the Vietnam War: Official Policy Advice to the Government 1960-1972. He visited the United States under the auspices of the United States State Department Visitor Programme in 1997 and India as a guest of the Indian Foreign Ministry in 2001.
