= List of permanent representatives of New Zealand to the United Nations in New York =

The permanent representative of New Zealand to the United Nations in New York is New Zealand's foremost diplomatic representative at the headquarters of the United Nations, and in charge of New Zealand's diplomatic mission to the United Nations in New York.

The Permanent Delegation is located at the United Nations headquarters in New York City. New Zealand has maintained a resident Permanent Representative to the UN in New York since 1949.

== Permanent representatives to the United Nations in New York ==
- Carl Berendsen (1949–52)
- Leslie Munro (1952–58)
- Foss Shanahan (1958–62)
- Frank Corner (1962–67)
- Charles Craw (1967–68)
- Norm Farrell (1968–69)
- John Scott (1969–73)
- Malcolm Templeton (1973–78)
- Tim Francis (1978–82)
- Bryce Harland (1982–85)
- David McDowell (1985–88)
- Hon. Dame Ann Hercus (1988–90)
- Terence O'Brien (1990–93)
- Colin Keating (1993–96)
- Michael Powles (1996–2001)
- Don MacKay (2001–05)
- Rosemary Banks (2005–09)
- Hon. Jim McLay (2009–15)
- Gerard van Bohemen (2015–17)
- Craig Hawke (2017–22)
- Carolyn Schwalger (2022–2026)
- Victoria Hallum (2026-present)

== See also ==
- List of permanent representatives of New Zealand to the United Nations in Geneva
- List of permanent representatives of New Zealand to the United Nations in Vienna
