= Frank Corner =

New Zealand diplomat (1920–2014)

Frank Corner CMG
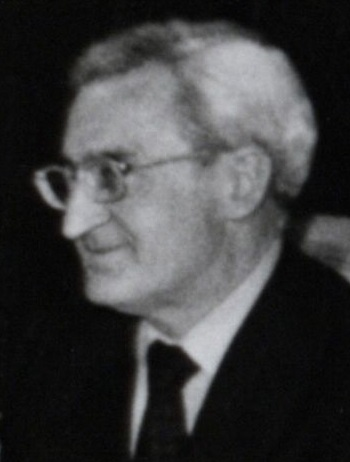
- Corner in 1976

3rd Secretary of Foreign Affairs
- In office 1 January 1973 – May 1980
- Preceded by: George Laking
- Succeeded by: Merv Norrish

6th New Zealand Ambassador to the United States
- In office 14 June 1967 – 2 October 1972
- Preceded by: George Laking
- Succeeded by: Lloyd White

Personal details
- Born: 17 May 1920 Napier, New Zealand
- Died: 27 August 2014 (aged 94) Wellington, New Zealand
- Education: Victoria University of Wellington
- Profession: Diplomat

Frank Henry Corner CMG (17 May 1920 – 27 August 2014) was a New Zealand diplomat. Corner served as New Zealand's Ambassador to the United Nations and the United States, before becoming New Zealand's third Permanent Secretary of Foreign Affairs (1973–1980).

== Early life ==
Born in Napier, Corner was educated at Napier Boys' High School and Victoria University of Wellington, where he graduated in 1942 with a Master of Arts (First Class) in history, under the guidance of Professor J.C. Beaglehole.

Corner joined the Ministry of Foreign Affairs in 1943, being recruited as one of its earliest foreign policy officers by then Secretary Alister McIntosh, who was in the process of building a professional foreign service. In his first years of service, he was seconded to the staff of H. V. Evatt, Australia's outspoken Foreign Minister. He was closely involved in drafting Evatt's speeches which defined an era known as "small power rampant". On his return he worked closely with Prime Minister Peter Fraser as he developed a more distinctly New Zealand position within the framework of the Commonwealth. He was New Zealand's political officer (policy adviser) at the Paris Peace Talks.

Corner was posted first to Washington in 1948, as First Secretary, where he was involved in the negotiation and signature of the ANZUS Treaty and the Japanese Peace Settlement. In 1952 he was appointed Deputy High Commissioner in London, and was in London during the Suez crisis when New Zealand found itself torn in its loyalties between its new friend and protector (the US) and its "mother country", Britain. In 1958, Corner returned to New Zealand as Deputy Secretary of Foreign Affairs.

== Diplomatic career ==
In 1961, Corner became New Zealand's Ambassador to the United Nations, where he chaired the Trusteeship Council for two years, and served on the United Nations Security Council. Corner was the leading proponent of decolonisation of Pacific territories under New Zealand control. Corner provided the leading intellectual arguments in favour of decolonisation of Tokelau, the Cook Islands, Niue, and Western Samoa.

In 1967, Corner moved to Washington, as New Zealand's Ambassador to the United States, succeeding George Laking, who had become Secretary of Foreign Affairs; he held this post until 1972 when he returned to Wellington to succeed Laking again as Secretary of Foreign Affairs and the Prime Ministers Department (the two roles were separated on his retirement in 1980). The principal themes during his time in Washington was the US' involvement in Vietnam, and New Zealand's expanding trade relations with the US leading up to Britain's entry into the European Economic Community. During his time as Ambassador, Corner oversaw a state visit to New Zealand by President Lyndon Johnson in 1967, and a state visit by Prime Minister Keith Holyoake to Washington. Corner later described this as "the high point of United States-New Zealand relations".

Corner was considered to be very close to Prime Minister Norman Kirk in arguing and advocating for an independent New Zealand foreign policy. Throughout this period, Corner promoted closer political relations with China, an expansion of New Zealand interests in North and Southeast Asia, and a greater role for New Zealand in the South Pacific. The Third Labour Government elected at the end of 1972 was expected to recognise the PRC. Then, surprisingly the new Prime Minister, Norman Kirk, hesitated: After barely two weeks in office he suggested that it might be better to delay recognition until his second term. However he was talked out of this by the Foreign Ministry (now under Frank Corner) and the recognition formalities were completed just before Christmas.

== Later life and death ==
Corner retired from the post of Secretary of Foreign Affairs 1980. In retirement, he was active in arts administration, and spent six years on the Council of Victoria University. In 1985 he chaired the Defence Committee of Enquiry to examine public attitudes towards defence in the wake of the Fourth Labour Government's ban on visits by nuclear capable warships. He was an avid collector of modern art (especially New Zealand art) and was a Fellow of the Royal Society of Arts.

Corner died in the Wellington suburb of Karori in 2014.

== Honours and awards ==
In 1953, Corner was awarded the Queen Elizabeth II Coronation Medal, and in 1977 he received the Queen Elizabeth II Silver Jubilee Medal. In the 1980 Queen's Birthday Honours, he was appointed a Companion of the Order of St Michael and St George. Corner was conferred an honorary Doctorate of Laws by Victoria University of Wellington in 2005.

Diplomatic posts
Preceded by Foss Shanahan	Permanent Representative to the United Nations in New York; 1962–1967	Succeeded by Charles Craw
Preceded by George Laking	Ambassador to the United States; 1967–1972	Succeeded by Lloyd White
