= Ministry of Foreign Affairs and Trade (New Zealand) =

Government ministry of New Zealand

- Manatū Aorere (Māori)

Agency overview
- Jurisdiction: New Zealand
- Headquarters: 195 Lambton Quay, Wellington; Wellington Region 6011; 41.283882°S 174.775604°E
- Employees: 1794
- Annual budget: Total budgets for 2024/25; Vote Foreign Affairs ▲$1,869,792,000 Total budget 2024-27; Vote Official Development Assistance ▲$2,910,020,000
- Ministers responsible: Rt Hon Winston Peters, Minister of Foreign Affairs; Hon Todd McClay, Minister for Trade
- Agency executive: Bede Corry, Chief Executive and Secretary of Foreign Affairs and Trade
- Website: mfat.govt.nz

The Ministry of Foreign Affairs and Trade (MFAT; Māori: Manatū Aorere) is the executive department of the Government of New Zealand charged with conducting the nation’s external relations, trade negotiations and international development programme. From its headquarters in Wellington, the ministry advises ministers on foreign and trade policy, negotiates free-trade and security agreements, manages New Zealand’s participation in multilateral institutions, and delivers consular and crisis-response services to citizens overseas. MFAT also administers the principal New Zealand aid agency, directing official development assistance and humanitarian response, principally in the Pacific region. Working closely with agencies such as New Zealand Trade and Enterprise and the New Zealand Defence Force, MFAT represents the country in fora ranging from the United Nations and World Trade Organization to APEC and the Pacific Islands Forum.

The department traces its origins to the Department of External Affairs, established on 11 June 1943 when New Zealand assumed responsibility for its own diplomatic network independent of the United Kingdom. It was renamed to the Ministry of Foreign Affairs in 1969 and took its present title in 1988.

As of 2025, MFAT employs more than 1,700 staff and maintains 60 permanent diplomatic posts, embassies, high commission and consulates, in 53 countries, alongside a satellite office in Auckland. The ministry is headed by the Secretary of Foreign Affairs and Trade, currently Bede Corry. The ministry's lead minister is the Minister of Foreign Affairs, currently Winston Peters.

MFAT’s mission is to safeguard New Zealand’s sovereignty, advance a stable, rules-based international order, deepen regional partnerships, particularly in the Pacific, and expand opportunities for New Zealand businesses abroad, while promoting human rights, sustainable development and effective global governance worldwide.

== History ==
New Zealand’s engagement with the world expanded rapidly during the Second World War. To improve Allied coordination, Wellington opened independent missions in Washington (1941), Ottawa (1942), Canberra (1943) and Moscow (1944), ending reliance on Britain’s diplomatic network. Parliament responded by passing the External Affairs Act on 11 June 1943, which created the Department of External Affairs (NZDEA) as a stand-alone ministry responsible for foreign relations, trade promotion and the recruitment of a professional diplomatic service.

Sir Alister McIntosh, appointed founding secretary, built that service and helped draft the United Nations Charter in 1945. Between 1945 and 1975 the secretary of External (later Foreign) Affairs simultaneously headed the Prime Minister’s Department, a dual role that kept external policy closely tied to executive decision-making.

The department became the Ministry of Foreign Affairs (MFA) in 1970 as New Zealand looked beyond the Commonwealth, particularly due to Britain’s planned entry to the European Economic Community, which drove a burst of embassy openings across Asia and Europe. At the same time New Zealand strengthened ties with ANZUS, a trilateral security alliance between Australia, the United States, and New Zealand, and began contributing more broadly to regional security operations. In 1975 the MFA absorbed the dissolved Department of Island Territories, bringing responsibility for Niue, the Cook Islands, Tokelau and Samoa under one roof.

Market-driven reform in the late 1980s reshaped the institution again. On 1 December 1988 the Trade Policy Division of the Department of Trade and Industry merged with the MFA to create the Ministry of External Relations and Trade (MERT). The State Sector Act 1988 also severed the ministry’s remaining administrative links with the Department of the Prime Minister and Cabinet. A further re-branding in 1993 produced today’s Ministry of Foreign Affairs and Trade (MFAT).

=== NZAID ===
The New Zealand Agency for International Development (NZAID) was created in 2002 to give the country’s aid programme an explicit poverty reduction mandate, separate from MFAT’s diplomatic work. Operating as a semi-autonomous unit within MFAT, it managed Official Development Assistance until April 2009, when a change of government folded the agency back into the ministry as the International Development Group (IDG) and re-centred its strategy on sustainable economic development.

Today the New Zealand Aid Programme, run by MFAT’s Pacific & Development Group, oversees a three-year NZ $2.91 billion appropriation for 2024-27. Funding is allocated across six envelopes, with 60 percent directed to Pacific partners, the balance split between global, multilateral, humanitarian and strategic initiatives. Despite steady nominal increases, New Zealand’s ODA amounted to just 0.23 percent of gross national income in 2022, well below the OECD-DAC average of 0.33 percent and the UN target of 0.7 percent. Addressing climate change is a growing priority: Wellington has committed US $740 million in climate finance for 2022-25, embedding gender equality objectives and Pacific resilience throughout its programming.

== Functions ==
=== Security Functions ===
One of MFAT's core functions is to ensure New Zealanders' safety and security, whether that is regional, international or online. The aim is to prevent and deal with conflicts and protect people and their way of life. There are many possible threats or conflicts that could create unsafe environments for New Zealanders. MFAT works on the improving and developing of cybersecurity networks, monitoring of terrorism groups and attacks, the destruction of lethal weapons, patrolling people smuggling and trafficking and investing in space security. MFAT plays a critical role in advocating for global peace, partnering with other countries, governments and organisations to promote more stable and widespread security initiatives. MFATs International Security and Disarmament Division (ISED) has the responsibility for international security and disarmament/non-proliferation policy.

=== Economic Functions ===
MFAT plays a critical role in the improving and representing of New Zealanders economic interests in international settings. MFAT partners with organisations like the World Trade Organisation and the Asia-Pacific Economic Cooperation to establish global and regional trade agreements and frameworks. By doing this, improving economic transactions between the New Zealand and overseas markets. International trade and investment are essential for New Zealanders to prosper and succeed. MFAT advocates for free trade and the reducing of tariff barriers to increase exporting and investments on goods and services for New Zealanders, protecting New Zealanders money and interests.

Other economic related MFAT functions include introducing and connecting New Zealand businesses to international markets, providing New Zealanders businesses with international economic and trade policy advice and monitoring overseas economic developments that could have a potential impact on New Zealand's investments and trade.

=== Environmental Functions ===
The well-being of New Zealanders depends on the international community working together to address shared challenges, and to defend and promote international rules that conserve and manage shared natural resources sustainably. MFAT works collaboratively with other government agencies and Pacific partners to promote New Zealanders position on international sustainability issues, as well as support the Pacific in their climate resilience.

MFAT as the representative of New Zealanders voices, advocates and supports developing countries impacted by climate change, particularly within the Pacific and South and Southeast Asia. This includes delivery of climate finance across a range of sectors such as fisheries, energy, infrastructure, disaster risk reduction, information for decision making, tackling invasive species, and water and food security. The International Development Cooperation (IDC) Programme provides funding and direct lines of communication and support for these developing countries and New Zealand's resources.

=== Government Functions ===
As a regional government agency, MFAT is the primary advisor of the government on international events that could have a possible impact on New Zealand and their interests as well as, advises the government on foreign trade, development cooperation policies and global legal issues. MFAT also represents New Zealand in treaty negotiations and agreements and international legal disputes.

=== Humanitarian and Consular Functions ===
Through the International Development Cooperation (IDC), MFAT has an extensive list of humanitarian functions that provide crisis relief to other countries, particularly South and Southeast Asia and particularly the Pacific, who are geographically the closest, integral international partners and share similar cultural and political values5. Some examples of the assistance that New Zealand provides which MFAT facilitates includes: deploying of medical specialist personnel, Urban Search and Rescue or Disaster Assistance Response Teams, Emergency Management personnel and provides medical resources, information and strategies on technical issues, financial support and partners with non-government organisations that have a strong international crisis response focus.

MFATs consular functions include providing support and aid to overseas New Zealanders who may need medical assistance, emergency funds, or are stuck in foreign countries for different reasons e.g. caught in warfare, arrested or have lost their travel documentation and/or passport due to theft. Consular functions also include providing travel information and advice to New Zealanders e.g. telling New Zealanders which countries not to travel to due to highly dangerous situations.

== Organisational structure ==
The Ministry has 1,794 staff, with 947 based in New Zealand and 847 based overseas at 58 posts in 50 countries.

The Ministry is led by the Chief Executive and Secretary of Foreign Affairs and Trade (currently Bede Corry), appointed by the Public Service Commissioner. The Secretary of Foreign Affairs and Trade is responsible for the Ministry, managing its staff, and delivering government foreign policy, international trade, and climate change objectives. A team of deputy chief executives and deputy secretaries are responsible for divisions organised into seven groups.

=== Groups ===
==== People and Operations Group ====
- Finance Division
- Information Management Division
- People Division
- Asset Management Division
- Commercial Division
- Enterprise Connections Division
- Security & Organisational Resilience Division

==== Policy ====
- Audit and Risk Division
- Communications Division
- Executive Services Division
- Māori Policy
- International Security and Disarmament Division
- Strategy & Performance Division

==== Americas and Asia Group ====
- Americas Division
- Asia Regional Division
- North Asia Division
- South and Southeast Asia Division

==== Europe, Middle East and Africa, and Australia Group ====
- Australia Division
- Europe Division
- Middle East and Africa Division

==== Multilateral and Legal Affairs Group ====
- Corporate Legal Unit
- Climate, Antarctica and Environment
- Consular Division
- Legal Division
- Protocol Division
- United Nations and Commonwealth Division

==== Pacific and Development Group ====
- Capability & Insights Division
- Development People and Planet Division
- Global Development and Scholarships Division
- Pacific Bilateral Division - Melanesia & Micronesia
- Pacific Bilateral Division - Polynesia & French Pacific
- Pacific Regional Division
- Partnerships, Humanitarian & Multilateral Division
- Development Economy & Prosperity Division

==== Trade and Economic Group ====
- APEC Policy Division
- Economic Division
- Trade Policy and Negotiation Division
- Trade Policy Engagement & Implementation Division

=== Foreign Representation ===
The Ministry is responsible for 58 posts across 50 countries worldwide. These consist of Embassies, High Commissions, and Consulate-Generals. Posts are managed by the head of mission, such as the High Commissioner or the Ambassador, who reports through the relevant geographical division, which in turn report to the responsible deputy secretary. Staff who support the functioning of the embassy include policy officers, administrative staff, and local staff who provide local knowledge of language, area, and government.

Foreign posts provide a range of support to New Zealanders overseas as well as diplomatic functions. Consular support they provide includes passports, help with contacting people in New Zealand, local advice, and notarial services such as affidavits and other New Zealand legal documents. Foreign posts also account for New Zealanders affected by major overseas crises, such as natural disasters.

=== Ministers ===
The ministry serves ministers in four portfolios, currently comprising four ministers. These ministers are supported in their roles by relevant groups and divisions within the ministry.

| Officeholder | Portfolios | Other responsibilities |
|---|---|---|
| Rt Hon Winston Peters | Lead Minister (Ministry of Foreign Affairs and Trade) Minister of Foreign Affairs | |
| Hon Todd McClay | Minister for Trade and Investment | Associate Minister of Foreign Affairs |
| Hon Nicola Grigg | Minister of State for Trade and Investment | |
| Hon Simon Watts | Minister of Climate Change | |

=== Secretaries of Foreign Affairs and Trade ===
| Order | Secretary | Term in office |
|---|---|---|
| 1 | Sir Alister McIntosh | 1943 – 1966 |
| 2 | Sir George Laking | 1967 – 1971 |
| 3 | Frank Corner | 1972 – 1980 |
| 4 | Merwyn Norrish | 1980 –1988 |
| 5 | Graham Ansell | 1989 – 1991 |
| 6 | Richard Nottage | 1991 – 1999 |
| 7 | Neil Walter | 1999 – 2002 |
| 8 | Simon Murdoch | 2002 – 2009 |
| 9 | John Allen | 2009 – 2015 |
| 10 | Brook Barrington | 2015 – 2019 |
| 11 | Chris Seed | 2019 – 2024 |
| 12 | Bede Corry | 2024–present |

== Māori Engagement ==
Te Hurumanu is the Māori Partnership Group established within Manatū Aorere to ensure that Māori perspectives, values, and interests are embedded into the Ministry’s strategic direction, policy development, and organisational priorities. The group operates as a Te Tiriti o Waitangi partnership, working closely with the Ministry’s Chief Executive and Senior Leadership Team to bring a Tirohanga Māori (Māori worldview) to foreign policy and governance issues.

=== Name and Origins ===
The name Te Hurumanu draws from Māori oral traditions. In one narrative, Hurumanu is one of the children of Ranginui and Papatūānuku, known as the ancestor of many seabirds that traverse vast ocean distances. This symbolism aligns with the international role of Manatū Aorere and Māori aspirations in global spaces. The group’s name also references the whakataukī (proverb) “Mā te huruhuru ka rere te manu”, or “by its feathers the bird flies.” In this context, huruhuru (feathers) symbolise elements that give Māori presence strength, including te reo Māori, tikanga, mātauranga Māori, and the principles of Te Tiriti o Waitangi. These feathers enable collective aspirations to take flight. The name was gifted by Ngahiwi Tomoana, the co-chair of Te Hurumanu.

=== Formation and Purpose ===
Te Hurumanu was established following recommendations in the 2021 Mātauranga Māori at MFAT report, which identified gaps in how Māori knowledge and perspectives were incorporated into the Ministry of Foreign Affairs and Trade’s policy and decision-making processes. The report recommended structural changes to ensure Māori were not only consulted but included as equal partners, in line with the principles of tino rangatiratanga and partnership under Te Tiriti o Waitangi. It also called for the Ministry to adopt a “true partnership” model with Māori, emphasising the importance of upholding Treaty commitments in both domestic and international policy.

The formation of Te Hurumanu was a formal response to the 2021 Mātauranga Māori at MFAT report, which recommended structural changes to ensure that Māori perspectives were embedded in the Ministry’s policy processes. Te Hurumanu was established to provide a dedicated mechanism for incorporating Māori expertise into senior leadership discussions and strategic decision-making. The group contributes to the Ministry's responsiveness to Māori by advising on strategic priorities, representing iwi and Māori interests in foreign policy, and supporting the integration of mātauranga Māori (Māori knowledge) into organisational practices. Members of Te Hurumanu are selected for their expertise in iwi governance, foreign affairs, and mātauranga Māori. The group includes representatives from across Aotearoa New Zealand, providing a range of iwi perspectives. Their role includes convening wānanga (forums) on policy issues and contributing to internal development that aligns with tikanga Māori. Te Hurumanu meets quarterly or as required.

=== Treaty of Waitangi in Trade Policy ===
Since 2001, all of New Zealand’s free trade agreements have included a Treaty of Waitangi exception clause. This clause ensures the New Zealand Government retains the right to implement policies necessary to fulfil its obligations to Māori under Te Tiriti o Waitangi. It is considered non-negotiable in trade negotiations and forms part of a broader set of reservations that allow for regulation in the public interest.

=== Māori Engagement in Trade ===
Manatū Aorere engages directly with Māori stakeholders to ensure trade policies reflect Māori interests. This engagement includes partnerships with Te Taumata, Ngā Toki Whakarururanga, and the National Iwi Chairs Forum’s Pou Tahua. These groups provide strategic advice, advocate for Māori rights, and participate in trade negotiation processes. A Memorandum of Understanding with Te Taumata formalises this relationship and supports Māori involvement in the negotiation and implementation of FTAs.

In 2018, MFAT commissioned BERL (Business and Economic Research Ltd) to assess Māori export capability. The report found that Māori businesses exported approximately $5.2 billion in 2023, representing 5.6% of New Zealand’s total exports. Key sectors include dairy, meat, food processing, wood and paper manufacturing, and emerging professional services.

Through Te Hurumanu and wider Māori engagement mechanisms, MFAT continues to strengthen its commitment to Māori partnership and ensure that Aotearoa’s foreign policy is reflective of its Te Tiriti-based responsibilities.

== See also ==
- Foreign relations of New Zealand
- List of diplomatic missions of New Zealand
- List of ambassadors and high commissioners to and from New Zealand as of 24 July 2006
- List of high commissioners of New Zealand to the United Kingdom
