= Patrick Mahony =

New Zealand judge

Sir Patrick Mahony KNZM

2nd Principal Family Court judge
- In office 1985–2004
- Preceded by: Peter Trapski
- Succeeded by: Peter Boshier

Personal details
- Born: Patrick Desmond Mahony
- Education: St Patrick's College, Silverstream
- Alma mater: Victoria University of Wellington
- Profession: Lawyer; judge

Sir Patrick Desmond Mahony KNZM is a former New Zealand judge. He served as principal judge of the Family Court from 1985 to 2004.

== Biography ==
From 1950 to 1953, Mahony was educated at St Patrick's College, Silverstream, where he was proxime accessit to the dux in his final year. He studied law at Victoria University of Wellington, graduating with a Bachelor of Laws degree in 1968. He worked for a Wellington law firm, primarily working in the area of corporate law.

In 1978, Mahony was appointed to the bench as a stipendary magistrate (now called District Court judge) based in Auckland. He was one of the original appointments to the Family Court of New Zealand when it was established in 1981, and in 1985 he became the principal judge of that court. He was intimately involved in work that led to the Domestic Violence Act 1995, and in 1996 he established the Family Violence Taskforce. Mahony retired as principal Family Court judge in 2004, and was succeeded in that role by Peter Boshier. Mahony continued as a part-time acting District Court judge until 2010.

Following his retirement from the Family Court, Mahony served as a member of the New Zealand Parole Board, and succeeded Anand Satyanand as chair of the confidential forum for former psychiatric patients.

Mahony's wife, Shirley, Lady Mahony, died on 11 August 2023.

== Honours and awards ==
In 1990, Mahony received the New Zealand 1990 Commemoration Medal. In the 2004 New Year Honours, he was appointed a Distinguished Companion of the New Zealand Order of Merit, for services to the Family Court. Following the reintroduction of titular honours by the New Zealand government in 2009, Mahony accepted redesignation as a Knight Companion of the New Zealand Order of Merit. In 2016, Mahony was named old boy of the year by his old high school, St Patrick's College.
