= 1994 Birthday Honours (New Zealand) =

Awards list for New Zealand

The 1994 Queen's Birthday Honours in New Zealand, celebrating the official birthday of Elizabeth II, were appointments made by the Queen in her right as Queen of New Zealand, on the advice of the New Zealand government, to various orders and honours to reward and highlight good works by New Zealanders. They were announced on 11 June 1994.

The recipients of honours are displayed here as they were styled before their new honour.

== Knight Bachelor ==
- Dr Stephen Gerard (Tipene) O'Regan – of Wellington. For services to the Māori people and the community.
- Dryden Thomas Spring – of Te Aroha. For services to the dairy industry.
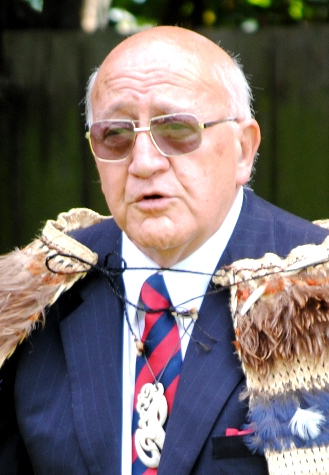
Sir Tipene O'Regan

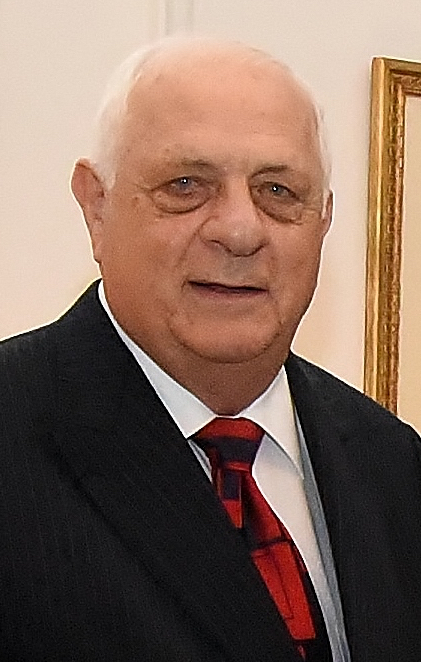
Sir Dryden Spring

== Order of Saint Michael and Saint George ==
=== Knight Commander (KCMG) ===
- John Fraser Robertson CBE – of Wellington; Chief Ombudsman.

=== Companion (CMG) ===
- Selwyn John Cushing – of Hastings. For services to business management.
- The Honourable George Frederick Gair QSO – of Auckland; lately New Zealand High Commissioner to the United Kingdom.
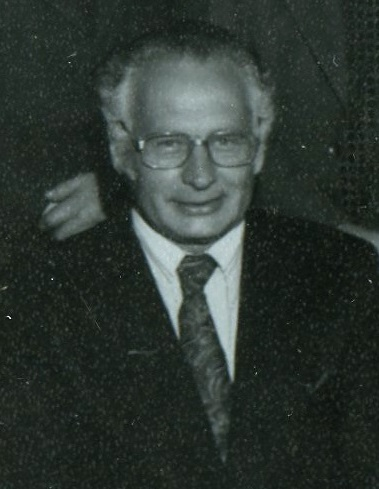
George Gair

== Order of the British Empire ==
=== Dame Commander (DBE) ===
Civil division

- Georgina Kamiria Kirby QSO JP – of Auckland. For services to the Māori people.
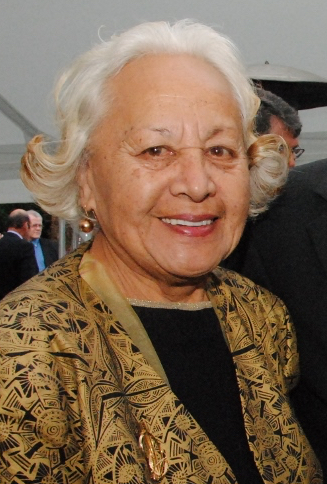
Dame Georgina Kirby

=== Knight Commander (KBE) ===
Military division

- Vice Admiral Somerford Francis Teagle – Royal New Zealand Navy, Chief of Defence Force.

=== Commander (CBE) ===
Civil division

- Dr Robin Helen Briant – of Auckland. For services to the medical profession.
- Brian Douglas Chamberlin – of Drury. For services to agriculture.
- David John Graham ED – of Auckland. For services to education.
- Areta Koopu – of Wellington. For services to the community.
- Professor Wilfred Gordon Malcolm – of Hamilton. For services to tertiary education.
- The Right Reverend Peter Woodley Mann – of Dunedin. For services to the Anglican Church.
- Samuel Darragh McGredy – of Auckland. For services to horticulture.
- Raywyn Alice Adam Ramage – of Christchurch. For services to education.

Military division

- Commodore Karl Robert Moen ADC – Royal New Zealand Navy.
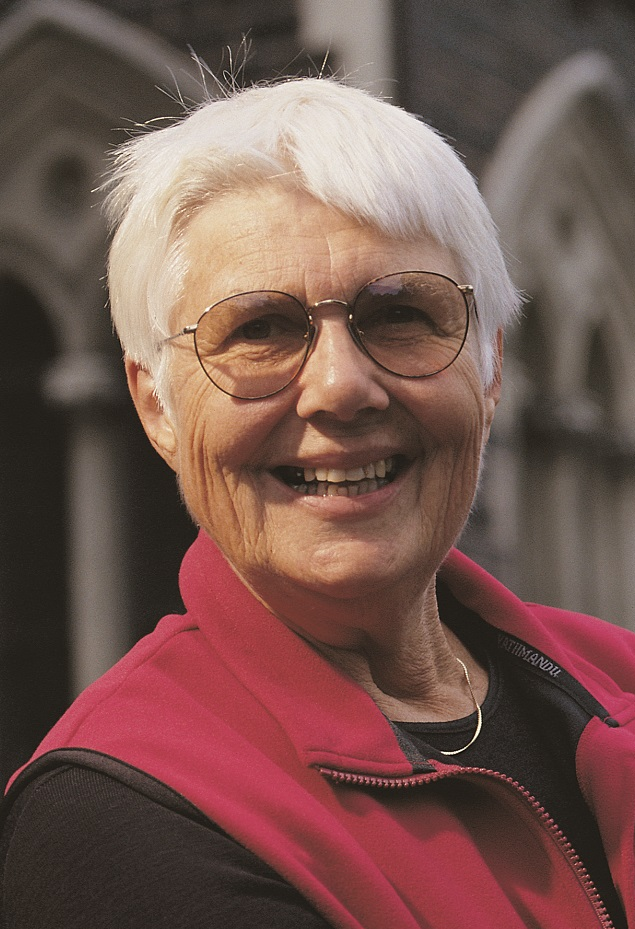
Robin Briant

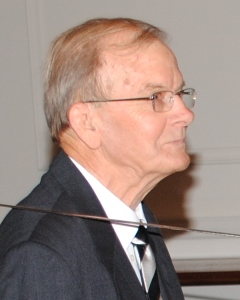
John Graham

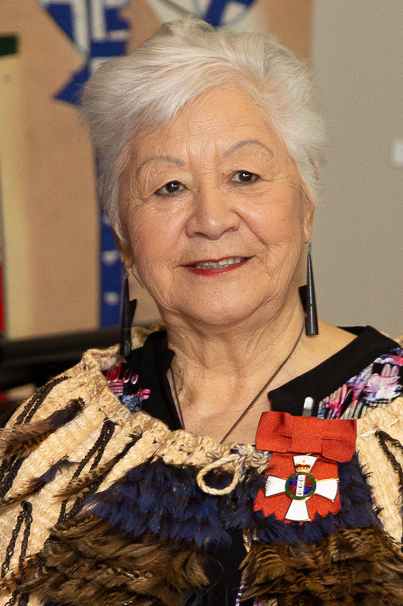
Areta Koopu

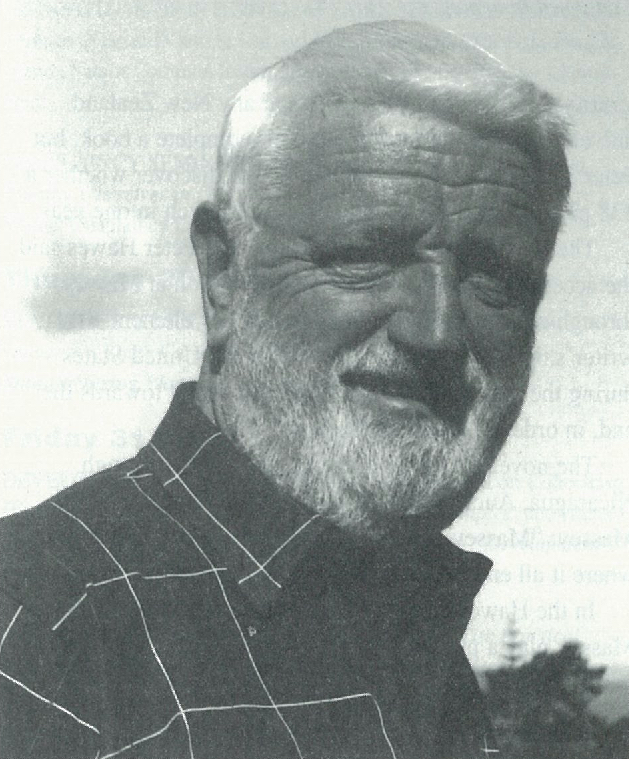
Sam McGredy

=== Officer (OBE) ===
Civil division

- Mervyn Russell Barnett – of Dunsandel. For services to rugby and the meat industry.
- Brion Philip Duncan QPM – assistant commissioner, New Zealand Police.
- Richard William Vincent Izard – of Wellsford. For services to manufacturing and the community.
- Harry Lancelot Hugh Julian JP – of Auckland. For services to the shipping industry and the community.
- Geoffrey James Harwood Moon – of Auckland. For services to the veterinary profession and photography.
- Maurice Leigh Newman DSC – of Christchurch. For services to the fishing industry and the community.
- Dorothy Lois Robertson JP – of Wellington. For services to the National Council of Women.
- Emily Rangitiaria Schuster QSM – of Rotorua. For services to Māori arts and crafts.
- Maurice Colin Sexton JP – of Palmerston North. For services to the community.
- Dr Philip Anthony Silva – of Dunedin. For services to health education.
- Bruce Henderson Smith – of Wellington. For services to the banking and finance industries.
- Julian Stanley Smith – of Dunedin. For services to business management and the community.
- Dr Sheila Margaret Tillott – of Warkworth. For services to women's health.
- Professor Helen Margaret Tippett – of Wellington. For services to architecture.
- Walter John Wagtendonk – of Katikati. For services to aviation.
- Dr Charlotte Rachel Anwyl Wallace – of Whitianga. For services to conservation and the environment.
- James Dunning Wallace – of Cambridge. For services to farming.

Military division

- Chaplain Peter Douglas Bean – Royal New Zealand Navy.
- Colonel John Patrick O'Brien ED – Colonels' List, New Zealand Army (Territorial Force).
- Group Captain Bruce Reid Ferguson AFC – Royal New Zealand Air Force.
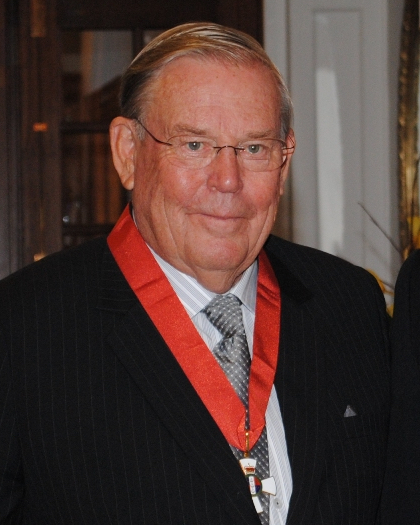
Richard Izard

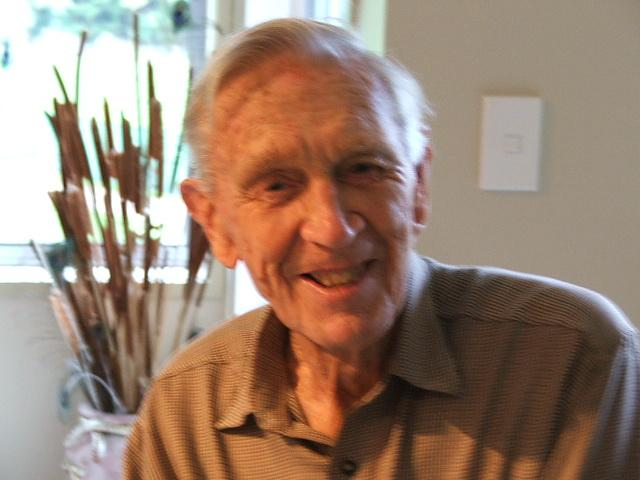
Geoff Moon

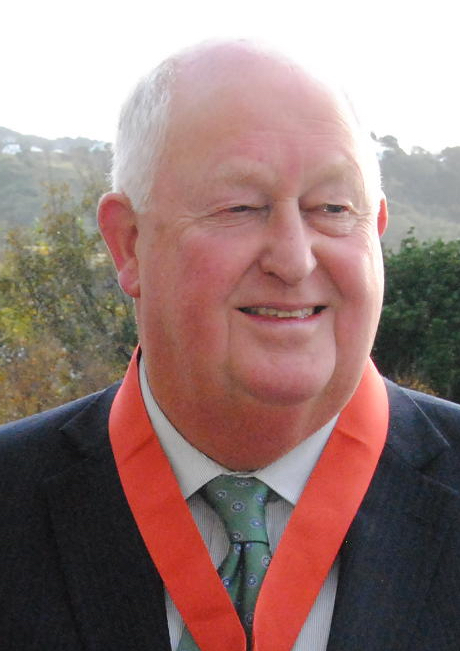
Julian Smith

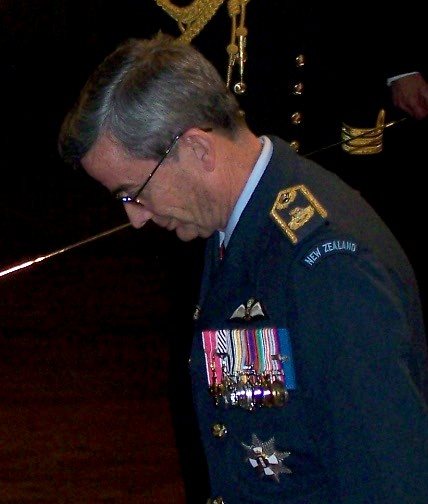
Bruce Ferguson

=== Member (MBE) ===
Civil division

- Hugh Robertson Anderson – of Hamilton. For services to motor sport.
- Howard Neill Austin – of Kaikohe. For public services.
- Sandra May Barwick – of Auckland. For services to athletics.
- Peter Allan Brown JP – of Dargaville. For services to local government.
- Hekenukumai Hector Busby – of Whangārei. For services to the Māori people.
- Patricia Eileen Dallinger – of Hamilton. For services to the community.
- William Freeman – of Palmerston North. For services to the racing industry.
- William Hector Gibson – of Wānaka. For services to agriculture.
- Edith Irene Gorringe – of Auckland. For services to the community.
- Judith Amy Haddon – of Auckland. For services to the community.
- Robert Edwin Hall – of Christchurch. For services to mountaineering.
- Daphne Ella Jarvis – of Whanganui East. For services to the community.
- Dr Alan Henry Kirton – of Hamilton. For services to agricultural science.
- Dr Roy Law Ting Shang – of Wellington. For services to the Chinese community.
- Stanley Arthur Lawson JP – of Auckland. For services to the community.
- Peter John Watt Lowry – of Upper Hutt. For services to the travel and tourism industries.
- Guy Lilian Lyth – of Nelson. For services to the community.
- Bruce Anthony Malcolm JP – of Dunedin. For services to trade-union affairs and the community.
- Doreen Esther Nitschke – of Whiritoa Beach. For services to weaving.
- Noeline Chell Nuttall JP – of Hamilton. For services to the community.
- Edward Guy Samuel Powell – of Christchurch. For services to engineering and the community.
- Patricia Maureen Raisin – of Palmerston North. For services to the community.
- Alan Robert Reith – of Ashburton. For services to local government.
- Moana Frances Koea Sharland – of New Plymouth. For services to the community.
- Lenore May Stewart – of Whanganui. For services to the community.

Military division

- Major Denis Sidney John Dwane – Royal Regiment of New Zealand Artillery.
- Captain Michael Anthony Mendonca – Royal New Zealand Army Ordnance Corps.
- Flight Lieutenant David William Green – Royal New Zealand Air Force.
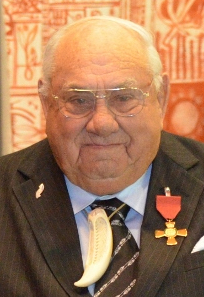
Hec Busby

== British Empire Medal (BEM) ==
Military division

- Chief Petty Officer Assistant Hydrographic Surveyor Charles William Morrison – Royal New Zealand Navy.
- Chief Petty Officer Electronic Warfare Instructor Nicholas Thomas Pritchard – Royal New Zealand Navy.
- Warrant Officer Class 2 Tony John Harding – Royal New Zealand Army Ordnance Corps.
- Corporal Richard Stuart Tyler – Royal New Zealand Army Ordnance Corps.

== Companion of the Queen's Service Order (QSO) ==
=== For community service ===
- Dorothy Mary Ballantyne (Dorothy Neal White) – of Dunedin.
- Stephen Barry Fisher – of Auckland.
- Mary Margaret Paget (Sister Mary Veronica) – of Hokitika.
- Shirley Payes – of Lower Hutt.
- Marilyn Joy Petersen JP – of Auckland.
- Mary Eliza Queale (Sister Maisie Queale) – of Oamaru.
- Marie Roberta Taylor – of Auckland.
- Gerard Donald Wills – of Auckland.

=== For public services ===
- The Honourable Phillip Albert Amos – of Auckland.
- Alison Joyce Gernhoefer – of Auckland.
- Thompson (Tom) Parore – of Whangārei.
- The Honourable William John Scott – of Auckland.
- Wilfred Simenauer – of Wellington.
- Dr Graeme Roy Stevens – of Lower Hutt.
- Brian William Stokes – of Christchurch.
- Jillian Ann Ussher – of Rangiora.
- Philip Reece Warren JP – of Auckland.
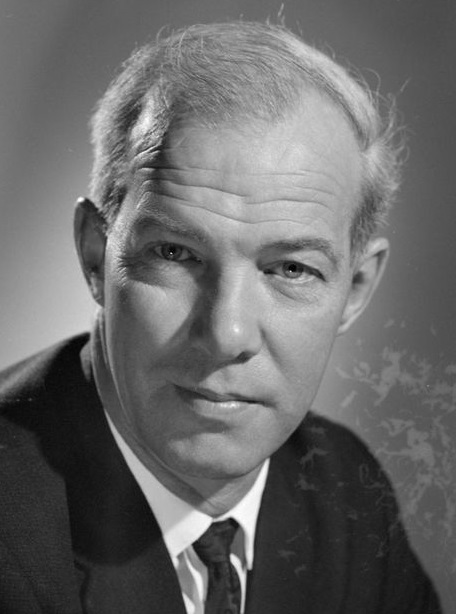
Phil Amos

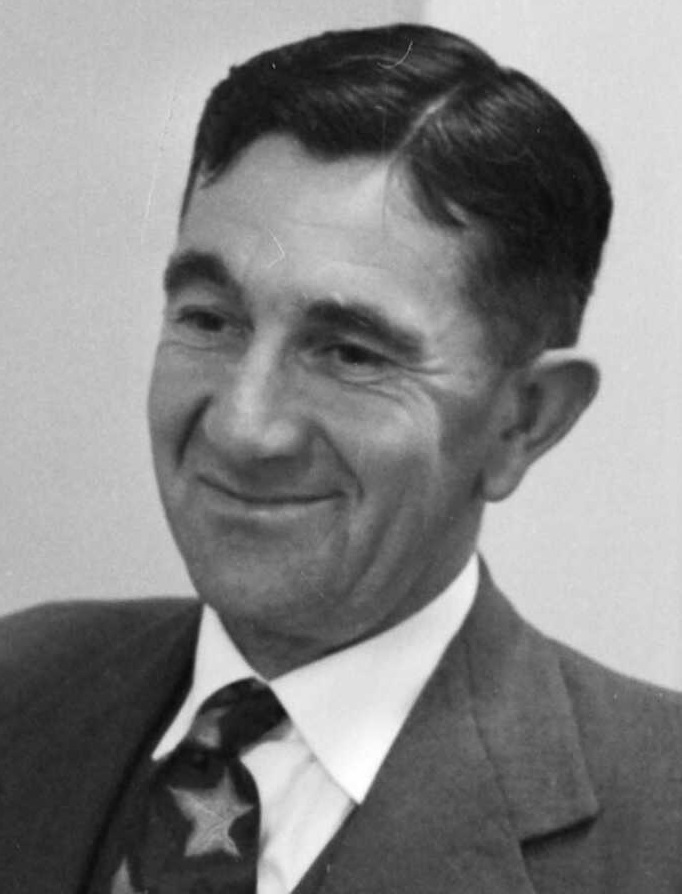
Jack Scott

== Queen's Service Medal (QSM) ==
=== For community service ===
- Joyce Allchurch – of Christchurch.
- Edith Anne Baker – of Auckland.
- Clarence Godfrey Kirk Beale – of Rotorua.
- Vaerie Bruce – of Gisborne.
- Joyce Carlton – of Hamilton.
- Neil William Columbus – of Christchurch.
- Clemons Landseer Green – of Wellington.
- Mona Malcolm Gunther – of Invercargill.
- Walter Edward Hugh Gutberlet – of Greymouth.
- Dawn Hamilton-Irvine – of Masterton.
- Robert Daniel Harvey – of Auckland.
- Julie Marguerite Hocken – of Christchurch.
- Kanui Maria Hunia – of Te Teko.
- Graham Cordue Jones – of Wellington.
- Jean Mary Jones – of Wellington.
- Elizabeth Mary Joplin – of Auckland.
- Edward John Kawiti – of Panguru.
- Yvonne Claire Keightley – of Te Puke.
- Rosemary Clare Kelly – of Roxburgh.
- Dallas Margery Knuckey – of Mount Maunganui.
- Reydon John Litten – of Auckland.
- Jean Maxwell – of Nelson.
- Nona Margaret Morris – of Pukekohe.
- Sidney Ernest Keith Morris – of Orewa.
- Olive Eunice Pond Plowman – of Napier.
- Margaret Ethelwyn Reeves – of Te Puke.
- Kathleen Ivy Smith – of Auckland.
- Annie Elizabeth Spencer – of Taumarunui.
- Elaine Jill Sullivan – of Christchurch.
- Eve Here Niurangi Taimana – of Auckland.
- Owen John Lumsden Taylor JP – of Oamaru.
- Helen Irene Twisleton – of Gisborne.
- Doris Dorothy Te Parekohe Vercoe – of Rotorua.
- Gordon Ashton Wardell – of Tokoroa.
- Betty Winsome Annie Woodham – of Blenheim.

=== For public services ===
- William Tireni Bennett JP – of Whakatu.
- Edith Muriel Bowden JP – of Hamilton.
- William Henry Caldwell – of Cromwell.
- Isobel Gilchrist Clarke – of Mataura.
- Sidney Quinn Cole JP – of Pukekohe.
- Arthur Neill Cooper – of Wellington.
- Esmae Muriel Cooper – of Wairoa.
- William John Curragh – of Matamata.
- Wilfrid Blake Day – of Waitangi.
- Christina Williams Dick JP – of Dunedin.
- Jessie Elizabeth Dow – of Auckland.
- James Gladstone Edwards JP – of Wellington.
- Bracy Matilda Catherine Gardiner – of Invercargill.
- Ernest Frederick Gates JP – of Waikanae.
- Danna Mary Glendining – of Martinborough.
- Michael Anthony Gough – of Wellington. (Note: Deceased 5 June 1994. Her Majesty's approval of this award was signified prior to the date of death.)
- Alan Evan Douglas Hepburn – of Methven.
- Ioane Pio Iosua – of Auckland.
- Dolly Jack – of Timaru.
- Margaret Matilda Kennedy – of Hikutaia.
- Brian Charles Russell Mallabar – senior constable, New Zealand Police.
- David McEwen – detective sergeant, New Zealand Police.
- John Francis McNally JP – of Auckland.
- Alwyn Price Ireland Owen – of Lower Hutt.
- Ramubhai Ranchhod Patel – of Auckland.
- Irene Christine Peak – of Auckland.
- James Trevor Pringle – of Oamaru.
- John Murray Rose – of Lawrence.
- Leo Charles Schultz JP – of Thames.
- Simon Shera – of Hāwera.
- Henry Jack Spackman – of Feilding.
- Terence William Thomas – of Blenheim.
- Robin Alan Wright – of Huntly.

== Queen's Fire Service Medal (QFSM) ==
- Rex Clive Allen – chief fire officer, Featherston Volunteer Fire Brigade, New Zealand Fire Service.
- Bruce George Burleigh – chief fire officer, Milton Volunteer Fire Brigade, New Zealand Fire Service.
- Don Brian Hassall – chief fire officer, Rangiora Volunteer Fire Brigade, New Zealand Fire Service.

== Queen's Police Medal (QPM) ==
- Ian Francis Hastings – superintendent, New Zealand Police.

== Air Force Medal (AFM) ==
- Flight Sergeant Stephen Wayne Skudder – Royal New Zealand Air Force.
