= Peter Boshier =

New Zealand Chief Ombudsman

Sir Peter Boshier KNZM
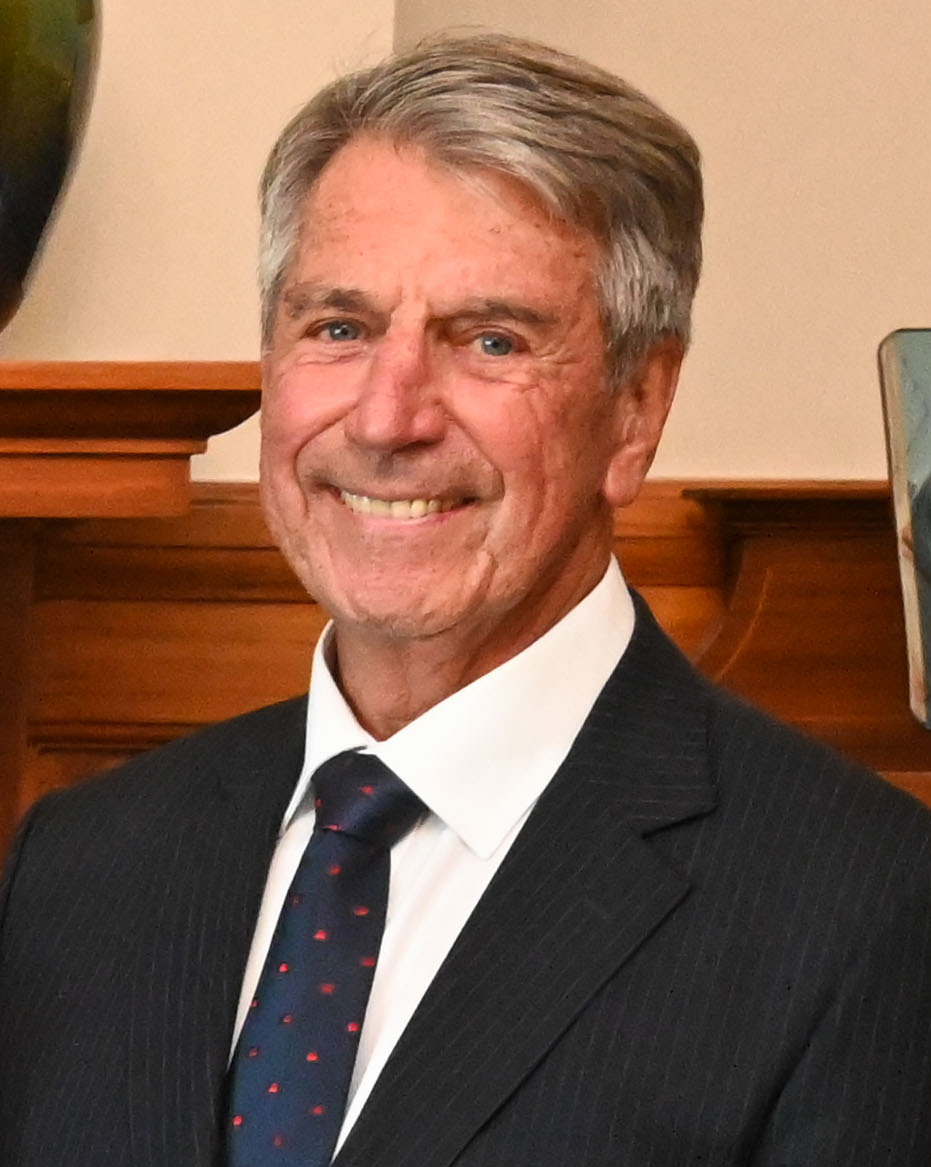
- Boshier in 2026

8th Chief Ombudsman
- In office 10 December 2015 – 28 March 2025
- Preceded by: Beverley Wakem
- Succeeded by: John Allen

3rd Principal Family Court Judge
- In office 3 May 2004 – 10 December 2012
- Preceded by: Patrick Mahony
- Succeeded by: Laurence Ryan

Personal details
- Born: Peter Francis Boshier; 16 March 1952 (age 74) Gisborne, New Zealand
- Education: Victoria University of Wellington
- Profession: Lawyer; judge

Sir Peter Francis Boshier KNZM (born 16 March 1952) is a New Zealand lawyer and judge. He served as the principal judge of the Family Court from 2004 to 2012. He was Chief Ombudsman from 10 December 2015 until 28 March 2025.

== Biography ==
Boshier was born in Gisborne on 16 March 1952. He was educated at Gisborne Boys' High School, and went on to study at Victoria University of Wellington, where he earned a Bachelor of Laws (Honours) degree in 1975.

Boshier practised law in Wellington, and his judicial career began in 1988 when he was appointed a District Court judge, specialising in family court matters. He was appointed principal Family Court judge on 3 May 2004, and remained in that role until 10 December 2012, when he became an acting Family Court judge for a two-year term.

In July 2012, Boshier was appointed to the Law Commission for a five-year term. He left that role early, in December 2015, having been appointed to a five-year term as Chief Ombudsman. He was reappointed for a second five-year term in 2020. He resigned on 16 March 2024 at the statutory retirement age of 72, but was asked to stay on until a replacement was found. He was succeeded by John Allen in March 2025.

Boshier was president of the Association of Family and Conciliation Courts in the United States from July 2015 to July 2016, the first New Zealander in this role. He was also active in the International Ombudsman Institute (IOI), serving as the Australasia and Pacific regional president in 2019, and as second vice-president of the IOI in 2022.

== Honours and awards ==
In 2009, Boshier received a Distinguished Alumni Award from Victoria University of Wellington.

Boshier (right), after his investiture as a Knight Companion of the New Zealand Order of Merit by the governor-general, Dame Cindy Kiro, at Government House, Auckland, on 1 October 2026

In the 2026 King’s Birthday Honours, Boshier was appointed a Knight Companion of the New Zealand Order of Merit, for services to the State and the judiciary.

Government offices
Preceded by Beverley Wakem	New Zealand Chief Ombudsman; 2015–2024	Succeeded by John Allen
Legal offices
Preceded by Patrick Mahony	Principal Family Court Judge; 2004–2012	Succeeded by Laurence Ryan
