= John Allen (diplomat) =

New Zealand public servant

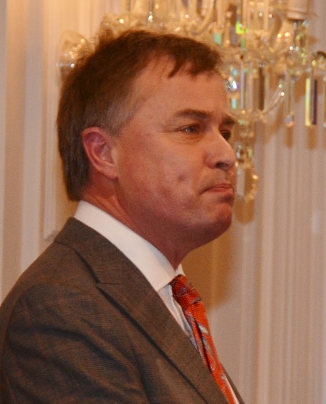
- Allen in 2014

9th Chief Ombudsman
- Incumbent
- Assumed office 31 March 2025
- Preceded by: Peter Boshier

Chancellor of Victoria University of Wellington
- In office 1 January 2022 – 11 February 2025
- Preceded by: Neil Paviour-Smith
- Succeeded by: Alan Judge

Personal details
- Born: John Richard Allen Hamilton, New Zealand
- Education: Victoria University of Wellington

John Richard Allen is a New Zealand public servant. From 2009 to 2014 he served as chief executive of the New Zealand Ministry of Foreign Affairs and Trade. He was the acting Administrator of Tokelau from 2009 until 2011. In 2025 he was appointed Chief Ombudsman.

Allen was born in Hamilton, New Zealand. He studied law in Wellington before becoming a partner at Rudd, Watts & Stone. He then worked for NZ Post, initially as executive of its letters business, before being appointed chief executive in 2003.

In April 2009 he was appointed chief executive of the New Zealand Ministry of Foreign Affairs and Trade, becoming the first non-diplomat to lead MFAT. His tenure was controversial, with restructuring plans resulting in widespread opposition from staff, and in leaks of MFAT cables to the opposition. In 2014 he was forced to apologise to rape victim Tania Billingsley over his handling of the 2014 Malaysian diplomat indecent assault case. He resigned from the role in November 2014 to take up a role with the New Zealand Racing Board. He was replaced as chief executive by Brook Barrington.

In September 2019 he resigned from the racing board. In 2020 he was appointed chief executive of WellingtonNZ. In October 2021 he was elected chancellor of Victoria University of Wellington.

In January 2025, the Officers of Parliament Committee recommended that Allen be appointed as the next Chief Ombudsman. The appointment was confirmed by Parliament on 30 January, and Allen took office on 31 March 2025.

As Ombudsman Allen advocated against a secrecy clause removing fishing boat monitoring camera footage from the coverage of the Official Information Act, and investigated both the Prime Minister's office and the Ministry of Education over allegations they were deliberately hiding information.

Government offices
Preceded by Peter Boshier	New Zealand Chief Ombudsman; 2025–present	Incumbent
