= New Zealand Probation Service =

The New Zealand Probation Service is a branch or service of the New Zealand Corrections Department. Established in 1886, its role is to manage offenders sentenced to community based sentences such as home detention, community detention and intensive supervision. The Service also manages prisoners in the community who have been released on parole and offenders on release conditions at the end of their prison sentence (for up to six months). According to Corrections website, in 2014 the Service was looking after approximately 30,000 offenders in the community. The Probation Officer's role is described as "work(ing) with people on probation to motivate them to make changes in their lives. This may include attending programmes to address violence, alcohol and drug abuse or driving offences."

In the 19th and early 20th century, probation officers were required to "befriend" offenders. As the number of offenders being managed in the community has grown, probation officers have had to become more focused on compliance with the sentence than on assisting offenders with rehabilitation. Corrections says the Probation Service is now more focused on keeping the public safe.

== Historical overview ==
According to Chief Justice Dame Sian Elias, the New Zealand Probation Service was formed in 1886. New Zealand pioneered the service long before any other country in the British empire including Great Britain. The legislation establishing probation in New Zealand was introduced by the Hon Joseph Augustus Tole who was Minister of Justice from 1884 to 1887. Tole said at the time: "It is cheaper and safer to reduce crime or to reform criminals than to build gaols". In 1906 The Evening Post (now defunct) described the act setting up probation as "one of the best ever placed on a statute book" and said "those who in 1886 had opposed it as dangerous legislation must now admit that such opinions were erroneous".

In recent years, the role of probation officers has changed considerably. In her "Blameless Babes" speech at Victoria University in 2009, Dame Sian said that "when legislation was enacted in England in 1907, one of the functions of the probation officer was 'to advise, assist and befriend' the offender." She said this principle was endorsed in New Zealand by the 1954 Criminal Justice Act which required probation officers "to assist the social rehabilitation of offenders." However Dame Sian points out that in the 21st century, "the statutory functions of the probation officer contain no explicit reference to advice or assistance, much less to 'befriending'," and she suggests that something has been lost in the process.

== Staff ==
The Probation Service includes probation officers, psychologists, programme facilitators, community work supervisors, managers and administrators – supported by the department's head office in Wellington. Between 2003 and 2010, frontline staff numbers increased by 145%, such that in June 2010 there were 2,311 staff in 120 offices nationwide. By 2016, this number had dropped to 1,200.

== Previous community based sentences ==
Probation officers are responsible for monitoring offenders on a variety of community based sentences.

=== Periodic detention ===
Periodic detention was first introduced in 1962. It enabled judges to send young offenders between the age of 15 to 20 to a residential facility. It was called periodic detention because it usually required the offender to reside at a work centre from Friday evening to Sunday morning and attend for two to four hours one evening during the week under the supervision of resident wardens. Detainees were required to participate in classes or "undergo such instruction as the warden considered conducive to that person's reformation and training". Ralph Hanan the Minister of Justice at the time described it as new sentence which would "provide a useful method of dealing with young louts, vandals and the like who may be headed towards a criminal career if not diverted at an early age".

=== Community service ===
Community service was established in 1980 as an amendment to the Criminal Justice Act 1954. It allowed an offender (convicted of an imprisonable offence) to undertake community service for a period of between 20 and 200 hours and the hours must be completed within 12 months. The service or work is usually for a charity or public agency and offenders cannot be paid for the work they do.

With the introduction of the Sentencing Act in 2002, periodic detention and community service were abolished and replaced by community work and community detention.

== Current community based sentences ==
=== Supervision ===
Supervision can be imposed for a period between 6 months and 1 year and requires the offender to report to a probation officer as and when directed. Reporting usually begins with once a week, but may be relaxed if the offender is compliant, to once a fortnight then once a month. The offender is required to notify the probation officer where they live and work and must obey any directives which prohibit "association with specified persons" such as co-offenders.

=== Intensive supervision ===
Unlike 'supervision', which is mainly a monitoring process, intensive supervision is a sentence focused on rehabilitation. It may be imposed for up to two years and includes participation in counselling, residential treatment if required and other appropriate training programmes. It may also include regular reports to the court on the offender's progress.

=== Community detention ===
Community detention was introduced by the Sentencing Act of 2002. This allows an offender to continue working in the community but under a curfew requiring them to remain at an approved residence at certain times, usually in the evenings. The sentence can be imposed for anywhere between 14 days and six months and the offender wears a bracelet and is monitored electronically to ensure compliance.

=== Home detention ===
In 2007 the Parole Amendment Act removed responsibility for the imposition of home detention from the Parole Board and made it a stand-alone sentence that could be imposed by district court judges. It can only be imposed as an alternative to prison if the potential prison sentence faced by the offender is two years or less.

Offenders on home detention are required to wear an ankle bracelet and stay at an approved address where they are electronically monitored 24 hours a day for up to 12 months. Detainees may be able to work but also have to undertake rehabilitation programmes to address the causes of their offending. Any leave of absence to attend work, rehabilitation programmes, or important appointments such as the doctor requires pre-approval of the offender's probation officer.

In 2014, approximately 1,800 offenders were serving sentences of home detention. Offenders are likely to be sent to prison if they leave the address without permission or breach the home detention rules. However, 'breaches' sometimes occur because the signal 'drops out' giving the impression that the offender has absconded from the detention address when they have not. The most significant breaches occur when offenders cut off the bracelet. According to the Corrections Department, only 1% of those on home detention cut their bracelets off and the majority are caught soon afterwards and sentenced to prison.

== Recent developments ==
One of the factors affecting the role of the Probation Service has been a dramatic increase in its workload. In 2003 the service managed a total of 55,869 sentences or court orders. By the end of 2009, that figure was up to 105,430. The department acknowledges that the quality of its service has been negatively affected by the increased workload and that probation officers have struggled to keep up.

There have been some serious incidents with offenders being managed by Probation. In 1997, William Bell killed three people and seriously injured another (Susan Couch) at the Panmure RSA after Probation failed to monitor him adequately once he was released from prison. Convicted murderer Graeme Burton was released on parole in 2006 and, within six months, committed another murder by shooting Karl Kuchenbecker in the hills of Wainuiomata. During this time police were well aware Burton was assaulting known drug dealers to obtain methamphetamine and other drugs but no attempt was made to have him recalled to prison.

In response to these failures, in 2009 Corrections initiated a "Change Programme" which redefined the purpose of the Probation Service and the way it worked. Katrina Casey, Probation General Manager at the time, said the new focus was on "holding offenders to account and managing them to comply with their sentences and orders, reduce their likelihood of re-offending and minimise their risk of harm to others." The Service said it would achieve this by replacing a "vast operations manual" with an online practice centre.

Shortly afterwards, the Auditor General, Kevin Brady examined Probations' management of 100 separate cases and issued a highly critical report. The report was released soon after Corrections claimed it had improved its management of prisoners on parole following its disastrous mishandling of Graeme Burton's case. It said the growing numbers of offenders on community-based sentences was exacerbating an existing staffing crisis. In response to the auditor general's criticisms, the Probation Service has taken on more staff and tightened up its procedures such that staff have now become even more focused on supervision and compliance. In October 2010, Probation Services claimed that 96% of parolees were now being managed correctly.

== Advice to courts and parole board ==
=== Court reports ===
In addition to managing offenders given community based sentences and offenders on parole, probation officers also provide information and reports to judges prior to sentencing - generally known as pre-sentence reports (or Provision of Information). POI contain information about the offender's background, his history of compliance with previous sentences and recommendations for a particular sentence - although it is up to the judge to decide what sentence to impose. Probation provides the courts with about 260 such pre-sentence reports every month. Judges rarely comment on the quality of reports but in 2013, the Auckland Probation service was criticised by Judge Nevin Dawson for failing to follow his orders regarding a pre-sentence report. The judge said the report was "extremely unhelpful" because it recommended community service and ignored his order to consider home detention in the case of two young men who flashed a laser light at a police helicopter.

Judges are also able to call for alcohol and drug assessments on offenders so they can ascertain the extent to which substance use has been a contributing factor in their offending. These assessments enable judges to decide whether the offender should be mandated to attend alcohol and drug counselling or a residential treatment programme as part of the sentence. Although 80% of offenders commit their crimes under the influence of alcohol and/or drugs, historically judges have ordered an assessment or treatment in only 5% of cases. In 2010, this figure went up to 10%.

=== Parole Board reports ===
Probation also assists sentence planners in prison in the preparation of reports on all prisoners appearing before the New Zealand Parole Board. These are known as parole assessment reports (PARs) and describe the parolees progress in prison - including which rehabilitation programmes the prisoner has completed, what misconduct or other incidents he has been involved in while in prison and an assessment of the proposed address to which the prisoner hopes to be released. The Probation Service also employs about 100 psychologists who write psychological risk assessments on prisoners to assist the Board determine their risk of re-offending on release.

In March 2015, probation officer Stanley Gilmour sued the Corrections Department after key paragraphs about a particular prisoner, whom he described as having a high risk of violent reoffending, were removed without his knowledge from his report delivered to the Parole Board. The prisoner was subsequently released by the Board but then disappeared from the address where his parole board required him to live. Mr Gilmour's barrister Warren Templeton said: "The claim highlights actions which fundamentally undermine the integrity of the system" and the report was forwarded to the Parole Board on a "misleading and incorrect basis".

=== Risk assessment ===
A significant feature of parole assessments is the RoC*RoI (Risk of re-Conviction times Risk of re-Imprisonment, pronounced "rock roy"). This is a statistical tool based on numerous factors in the offenders personal history which assesses their future risk of reimprisonment. Relevant factors include the offender's age when first convicted, his number of previous offences, number of prison sentences and their escape history. Other variables include the offender's level of education, employment history, criminal attitudes, criminal associates, and history of alcohol and drug use. The offender's Risk of Re-conviction (RoC) is multiplied by the offender's Risk of Imprisonment (RoI) giving a percentage score which indicates the likelihood of the offender ending up back in prison. According to Corrections, "statistical or actuarial scales (such as the RoC*RoI) consistently outperform the judgements of experts" when assessing risk of re-offending. However, RoC*RoI relies on data available to Corrections and may not take into account youth offending or offending outside of New Zealand, and it can produce anomalous results for some offences such as drink driving and child sex offending. A parole assessment report, with the prisoner's RoC*RoI score, is provided to the Parole Board on every prisoner appearing before it.

=== Concerns about quality ===
Despite the department's reliance on statistical analysis, the auditor general is concerned about the quality of reports given to courts and to the Parole Board. In a review provided to Parliament in 2012, he recommended that Corrections should have their reports audited by independent assessors from outside the department.

The Parole Board also has concerns about the information it receives - particularly the lack of alcohol and drug assessments on offenders. The National Study of Psychiatric Morbidity in NZ Prisons, conducted in 1999, said 89.4% of prisoners had a current alcohol or drug problem. Despite this high percentage, in 2010, former board chairman, Judge David Carruthers, declared that the Parole Board is "flying blind" on this issue. Section 43(1(a)) of the Parole Act 2002 states:

When an offender is due to be released at his or her statutory release date, or to be considered by the Board for parole, the Department of Corrections must provide the Board with copies of all relevant information relating to the offender's current and previous convictions, including (for example) sentencing notes and pre-sentence reports.

After the 2011 election, a commitment to conduct alcohol and drug assessments on all parolees prior to their release was included as part of the confidence and supply agreement between Peter Dunne of United Future and the National Party. By 2013, this commitment had not been honoured.

== See also ==
- Crime in New Zealand
- Department of Corrections
- New Zealand Parole Board
- Howard League for Penal Reform Canterbury
