= Coalition for Open Government =

New Zealand political pressure group

The Coalition for Open Government (COG) was a pressure group formed in the late 1970s to promote open government in New Zealand. It was not affiliated to a particular political party. The Coalition disbanded in the-mid 1980s but re-formed in April 2007, in response to Government plans to rewrite the election finance laws.

== History ==
The group was formed in September 1979 in opposition to the National Development Bill which was part of then Prime Minister Robert Muldoon's Think Big programme. It had several concerns about the proposed legislation: the speed of its introduction, the secrecy and lack of public consultation which would occur as a result of the legislation, the removal of the right of local authorities to make decisions about their regions and lack of environmental protection in the utilisation of natural resources. It believed that decisions about issues that affect people's lives should be made by the people and those made in the national interest should be scrutinised by the nation not just the authorities. The government on the other hand sought to allow development projects to proceed without objections from local government, the public and interest groups and to give the Minister for National Development the power to push through development projects with few checks on that power. The group did not see itself as a lobby group but aimed to disseminate information to enable others to ask questions of the government.

COG was not affiliated to any political party. Its founders were environmental researcher Keith Johnson, environmentalist and journalist Patricia Sarr, public servant Alistair Graham and the director of the Inner City Ministry in Wellington Mike Smith. Economist Geoff Bertram later joined the group. Sir Guy Powles, the former Chief Ombudsman of New Zealand was COG's patron. Other well-known members of COG were Professor John Morton and Dr Ian Prior. The group also relied on the work of volunteers and was funded by donations from supporters.

In 1983 COG was awarded the New Zealand Communicator Award by the Press Gallery in Parliament. It was the first time the award had been given by the Gallery.

=== Campaigns ===
When the National Development Bill was introduced COG sent 1000 letters to local authorities, organisations and community groups about the dangers in the legislation. The result was that COG's material was used by the media and recognised for its credibility and a wide range of organisations and groups presented submissions on the bill.

COG's work challenged the government to justify other Think Big development projects: the proposal to build a second aluminium smelter at Aramoana, the Motunui synthetic fuel plant, the 1982 Energy Plan, the need for the Clyde Dam on the Clutha River, Waikato coal mining.

COG's campaign to allow greater access to government-held information was important in the adoption of the Official Information Act 1982. The group organised seminars to explain the Act.

=== Disbanding and reformation ===
When COG was founded it was agreed that it would disband in five years. It did disband in 1984 and deposited its records covering the period 1978 to 1984 in the Turnbull Library.

In 2007 COG reformed to campaign for effective election finance law. The group had major concerns about the Bill particularly its failure to ban secret donations to political parties. It campaigned for political donations to be revealed before elections not after, limits on donations, a cap on the amount third parties can spend influencing elections and public funding for election campaigns. COG's patrons were Lloyd Geering, Patricia Grace, Anton Oliver and Paul Harris.

== Selected publications ==
- "Open government report". Periodical 1979–1984. ISSN 0111-0500.
- Powles, G.; Longworth, E. (1980). Freedom of information and the state : a discussion paper for the 1980 Conference on Freedom of Information and the State, December 6 & 7, Victoria University, Wellington. Coalition for Open Government. OCLC 56083501.
- Coalition for Open Government (1983). How to use the Official Information Act effectively : a user’s guide. OCLC 152448913.
