= John Belgrave =

New Zealand public servant

John Belgrave DCNZM

6th New Zealand Chief Ombudsman
- In office 1 July 2003 – 3 December 2007
- Preceded by: Sir Brian Elwood
- Succeeded by: Beverley Wakem

Chair of the Commerce Commission
- In office 1999–2003
- Deputy: Mark Berry
- Preceded by: Alan Bollard
- Succeeded by: Paula Rebstock

Personal details
- Born: Maurice John Belgrave; 31 August 1940 Rotorua, New Zealand
- Died: 3 December 2007 (aged 67)
- Education: Victoria University of Wellington (BCom)

Maurice John Belgrave DCNZM (31 August 1940 – 3 December 2007) was a senior public servant and Chief Ombudsman of New Zealand.

== Education ==
Belgrave was born in Rotorua, and educated at Sacred Heart College, Auckland, and at Victoria University of Wellington, where he received a Bachelor of Commerce degree in economics.

== Early career ==
Belgrave joined the public service in 1964, joining the Department of Trade and Industry. Belgrave was posted to London, where he served as second secretary (commercial) at the High Commission for four years. Belgrave was promoted rapidly, and became Consul-General and Trade Commissioner in Melbourne in 1968.

In 1973, Belgrave became Director of the Price and Stabilisation department in the Department of Trade and Industry, a key role responsible for monitoring commercial price controls in the then highly regulated New Zealand economy.

In 1976, Belgrave was posted to Tokyo as Minister and Senior Trade Commissioner, where he served for four years.

In 1980, he was assistant secretary of Trade and Industry, moving to Assistant Director-General in the Ministry of Agriculture and Fisheries in 1982.

== Senior public servant ==
In 1985, Belgrave accepted his first of four postings as chief executive of a government department, as Comptroller of Customs. Belgrave left the public service in 1988 to become Chief Executive of the Bankers' Association, before being wooed back in 1989 by State Services Commissioner Don Hunn as Secretary of Commerce, the successor department of the Department of Trade and Industry.

During this time, the departmental responsibilities included competition policy, energy, consumer affairs, company regulation, tourism, information technology policy, minerals, and economic development.

In 1994, Belgrave was appointed by Hunn again as Secretary of Justice. Belgrave's mandate included the division of the Department of Justice into a separate policy unit, the Ministry of Justice, and the separate departments of Courts and Corrections. He retained responsibility for the Ministry of Justice, while the Departments for Courts and Corrections were established into separate structures. As Secretary of Justice, Belgrave was a member of the Electoral Commission.

In 1997, he left the public sector again, to the post of executive director of the Electricity Supply Association, where he was responsible for the implementation and reorganisation of the energy sector, during Max Bradford's reforms of the electricity industry.

In 1999, Belgrave became Chairman of the Commerce Commission, holding that post for two terms, before being appointed as Chief Ombudsman in 2003.

Belgrave was chairman of the board of Victoria University's Institute of Policy Studies, and was a fellow of the Institute of Management, and the Institute of Directors.

== Chief Ombudsman ==
Belgrave was involved in several high-profile inquiries in his role as Chief Ombudsman. In 2005, Belgrave ordered that the Minister of Finance Michael Cullen must release the costings of the interest-free student loan policy prior to the election, after Cullen had refused to do so.

In 2005, Belgrave, a former Justice Secretary, reviewed prisoner conditions at several prisons in New Zealand, following complaints about the prisoner treatment regime in prisons. In 2007, Belgrave conducted an inquiry into the Department of Corrections' policy for transporting prisoners, following the murder of 17-year-old Liam Ashley while being transported to Court in the back of a Corrections-contracted van. Belgrave described the Corrections' policy of transporting prisoners as "inhumane", and ordered a review of the prisoner transport system.

Belgrave died in office in December 2007.

== Personal life ==
In 1963, Belgrave married Judith Anne Jenner, and the couple had five children. In 1990, Belgrave was awarded the New Zealand 1990 Commemoration Medal, and in the 2007 New Year Honours, he was appointed a Distinguished Companion of the New Zealand Order of Merit for public services, including as Chief Ombudsman.

Government offices
Preceded by Sir Brian Elwood	New Zealand Chief Ombudsman; 2003–2007	Succeeded by Beverley Wakem
Preceded by Alan Bollard	Chair of the Commerce Commission of New Zealand; 1999–2003	Succeeded by Paula Rebstock
