= Lester Castle =

New Zealand public servant (1921–1986)

Lester Castle CMG

3rd New Zealand Chief Ombudsman
- In office 1984–1986
- Preceded by: Sir George Laking
- Succeeded by: John Robertson

Personal details
- Born: Lester John Castle; 13 July 1921 Wellington, New Zealand
- Died: 26 November 1986 (aged 65) Wellington, New Zealand

Lester John Castle CMG (13 July 1921 – 26 November 1986) was the Chief Ombudsman of New Zealand from 1984 to 1986. In this role, he was responsible for investigating complaints against central and local government agencies, including Ministers of the Crown.

== Biography ==
Castle was born in Wellington in 1921. He was the son of Sydney Castle, also a lawyer, and attended Christ's College, Christchurch and Victoria University College, graduating LLB in 1947.

He became a Wellington solicitor, Council member and President of both Wellington Law Society and the New Zealand Law Society. He was appointed an ombudsman in 1977, and Chief Ombudsman in 1984, holding this position until his death in Wellington on 26 November 1986.

== Honours ==
Castle was appointed a Companion of the Order of St Michael and St George in the 1977 Queen's Silver Jubilee and Birthday Honours, and was awarded the Queen Elizabeth II Silver Jubilee Medal the same year.

Government offices
Preceded by Sir George Laking	New Zealand Chief Ombudsman; 1984–1986	Succeeded by John Robertson
