= David Carruthers (judge) =

New Zealand judge (born 1940 or 1941)

Sir David Carruthers KNZM

6th Chair of the Independent Police Conduct Authority
- In office 2012–2017
- Preceded by: Lowell Goddard
- Succeeded by: Colin Doherty

2nd Chair of the New Zealand Parole Board
- In office 2005–2012
- Preceded by: Tony Ellis
- Succeeded by: Warwick Gendall

5th Chief District Court judge
- In office June 2001 – June 2005
- Preceded by: Ron Young
- Succeeded by: Russell Johnson

Personal details
- Born: David James Carruthers; 1940 or 1941 (age 85–86) Pahiatua, New Zealand
- Education: Victoria University of Wellington

Sir David James Carruthers KNZM (born 1940 or 1941) is a long-serving member of the New Zealand legal community. He worked as a lawyer in Wellington, Pahiatua and Palmerston North, before being appointed as a Family Court Judge in 1985. In 2001, Carruthers was appointed as Chief District Court Judge, a position he held until 2005, when he was appointed as the chairman of the New Zealand Parole Board. In 2012, Carruthers joined the Independent Police Conduct Authority as its chairman. Since 2021 Carruthers has been the Independent Implementation Monitor to oversee the implementation of the recommendations of the Victorian Royal Commission into the Management of Police Informants.

== Early life and family ==
Carruthers was born in 1940 or 1941, and raised in Pahiatua, New Zealand. He went on to study law, graduating LLB from Victoria University of Wellington in 1962. He completed his LLM with honours two years later.

Carruthers is married and has five children.

== Career ==
=== Legal practice ===
Carruthers practised law in Wellington and Pahiatua for 20 years before moving to Palmerston North.

=== Judiciary ===
In 1985, Carruthers was appointed as a judge in the Family Court in Wellington. Five years later he became a judge in the Youth Court, eventually being appointed as Principal Youth Court Judge. In 2000, Carruthers was asked to lead a Ministerial Taskforce on Youth Offending to come up with initiatives designed to reduce youth crime after Ministry of Justice figures showed that "over the 1990s, offending by 10- to 16-year-olds increased by 55%". In 2001, Carruthers was appointed as Chief District Court Judge, a position he held until 2005.

Carruthers also served as a judge on the High Court of Vanuatu.

=== New Zealand Parole Board ===
Carruthers was appointed Chairman of the New Zealand Parole Board in 2005, a position he held until 2012. He was head of the Board when it made the decision to release Graeme Burton from prison in July 2006. Six months later, Burton shot and killed Karl Kuchenbecker in the hills of Wainuiomata and injured a number of others.

=== Independent Police Conduct Authority ===
In April 2012, Parliament appointed Carruthers as chairman of the Independent Police Conduct Authority (IPCA).

=== Independent Implementation Monitor ===
On 1 March 2021 it was announced that Carruthers would be appointed to the role of Independent Implementation Monitor to oversee the implementation of the recommendations of the Victorian Royal Commission into the Management of Police Informants. Carruthers provided his first report to the Attorney-General in September 2021. This report provided information to the Attorney-General for their first report to Parliament on the progress of implementation of the Royal Commission’s recommendations which was tabled in the Victorian parliament on 30 November 2021.

=== Public speeches ===
Carruthers has given speeches at numerous conferences and seminars both in New Zealand and overseas. For many years he has pushed for a more humane approach to dealing with criminal offenders advocating, in particular, for increased use of restorative and therapeutic justice approaches. He has held a number of public and charitable offices and recommended greater focus on education, and interventions for youth and families rather than locking up more and more offenders. Speaking at a criminology conference in November 2012, Carruthers commented on the reduction in New Zealand's crime rate. He believes the drop may be due to efforts to reduce the number of teenagers being suspended or expelled from school.

== Honours and awards ==
In 1990, Carruthers was awarded the New Zealand 1990 Commemoration Medal. In the 2005 Queen’s Birthday Honours, he was appointed as a Distinguished Companion of the New Zealand Order of Merit, for services to the District Court. In 2009, following the reinstatement of titular honours by the New Zealand government, Carruthers accepted re-designation as a Knight Companion of the New Zealand Order of Merit.
