= Family Courts Act 1980 =

Act of Parliament in New Zealand

New Zealand Parliament
- Long title: An Act to establish Family Courts as divisions of District Courts, and to provide for the constitution, jurisdiction, powers, and procedures of Family Courts
- Commenced: 1 October 1981
- Administered by: Minister of Justice

Amends
- Family Courts Amendment Act 1991, 2007, 2000, 2008 Department of Justice (Restructuring) Act 1995, District Courts Amendment Act 1996
- Status: Current legislation

The Family Courts Act 1980 is a New Zealand law covering family courts, which have jurisdiction over marriage, civil unions, divorce, custody of children, child support and wills. Family courts are a division of the District Court and also operate under the District Courts Act 1947. Family courts were among the first in New Zealand to focus on informality; neither judges nor lawyers may wear wigs and gowns are banned for lawyers and optional for judges.

The Act is notable for Section 11B, which amounts to a default blanket ban on reporting of most of the business of the court when children are involved. Stories that are reported often have details such as the gender of children omitted. A rare instance of detailed on-going coverage was the kidnapping of Jayden Headley, when publishing of the details was encouraged to locate the victim.

Most of the acts the family courts have jurisdiction over have been updated to include same-sex partners. Exceptions are the Marriage Act 1955, which is matched by the Civil Union Act 2004 and the Adoption Act 1955 which currently prevents same-sex couples from adopting. There is currently political pressure to change this.
