= Local Government Official Information and Meetings Act 1987 =

Act of Parliament in New Zealand

New Zealand Parliament
- Long title: An Act to make official information held by local authorities more freely available, to provide for proper access by each person to official information relating to that person which is held by local authorities, to provide for the admission of the public to meetings of local authorities, to protect official information held by local authorities and the deliberations of local authorities to the extent consistent with the public interest and the preservation of personal privacy, and to establish procedures for the achievement of those purposes.
- Royal assent: 17 July 1987
- Commenced: 1 March 1988
- Administered by: Minister of Internal Affairs
- Introduced by: Michael Bassett

Amended by
- None

Related legislation
- Official Information Act 1982
- Status: Current legislation

The Local Government Official Information and Meetings Act 1987 (sometimes known by its acronym LGOIMA) is a statute of the New Zealand Parliament which creates a public right of access to information held by local authorities and council-controlled organisations and sets standards of openness for local authority meetings. It is one of New Zealand's freedom of information laws.

== Summary of the Act ==
The Act is an implementation of freedom of information legislation. It creates a regime by which any person can request and receive information held by local authorities and council-controlled organisations. The request regime mirrors that of the Official Information Act 1982 (OIA), with similar (though more limited) withholding grounds. A significant difference is that requests under LGOIMA can be made by "any person", rather than New Zealand citizens or residents. As with the OIA, decisions made under the Act can be appealed to the Ombudsman, and there is immunity from civil and criminal proceedings for good faith decisions to release information under the Act.

The Act also sets standards for local government transparency, requiring that meetings of local authorities be publicly notified and open to the public and that their agendas, reports, and minutes be available to the public. Local authorities can exclude the public from part of a meeting only after a resolution and for specified reasons. Additional provisions provide privilege against defamation for local authority minutes and agendas, and protect oral statements made at local authority meetings.

In 2012 the Act was reviewed by the New Zealand Law Commission as part of its review of the OIA. The Law Commission recommended that it be incorporated into a rewritten, general freedom of information law covering both central and local government.

In November 2022 the government introduced legislation to add "national security" withholding grounds to the Act.

== See also ==
- Local government in New Zealand
- Office of the Ombudsman
- Official Information Act 1982
