= Official Information Act 1982 =

Act governing freedom of information in New Zealand

New Zealand Parliament
- Long title: An Act to make official information more freely available, to provide for proper access by each person to official information relating to that person, to protect official information to the extent consistent with the public interest and the preservation of personal privacy, to establish procedures for the achievement of those purposes, and to repeal the Official Secrets Act 1951
- Citation: 1982 No. 156
- Territorial extent: New Zealand
- Royal assent: 17 December 1982
- Commenced: 1 July 1983
- Administered by: Minister of Justice
- Introduced by: Jim McLay

Repeals
- Official Secrets Act 1951

Amended by
- 1987, 2003, 2015

Related legislation
- Local Government Official Information and Meetings Act 1987
- Status: Current legislation

The Official Information Act 1982 (OIA) is a statute of the New Zealand Parliament that creates a public right to access information held by government bodies. It is New Zealand's primary freedom of information law and an important part of New Zealand's constitutional framework.

The guiding principle of the act is that official information should be made available unless there is good reason for withholding it. Requests to government departments or state agencies for information must be answered "as soon as reasonably practicable", and within 20 working days. If an agency declines to provide the information, it must provide a reason and advise the requester that they have the right to ask the Ombudsman to investigate whether or not that decision is justified under the provisions of the act. Approximately 45,000 requests are made under the act each year, with over 90% of them answered within statutory timeframes.

There have been repeated proposals for reform and further improvements to transparency over the act's lifetime, including major reviews by the New Zealand Law Commission in 1992 and 2012, but it has not been significantly reformed since 1987.

== Background ==
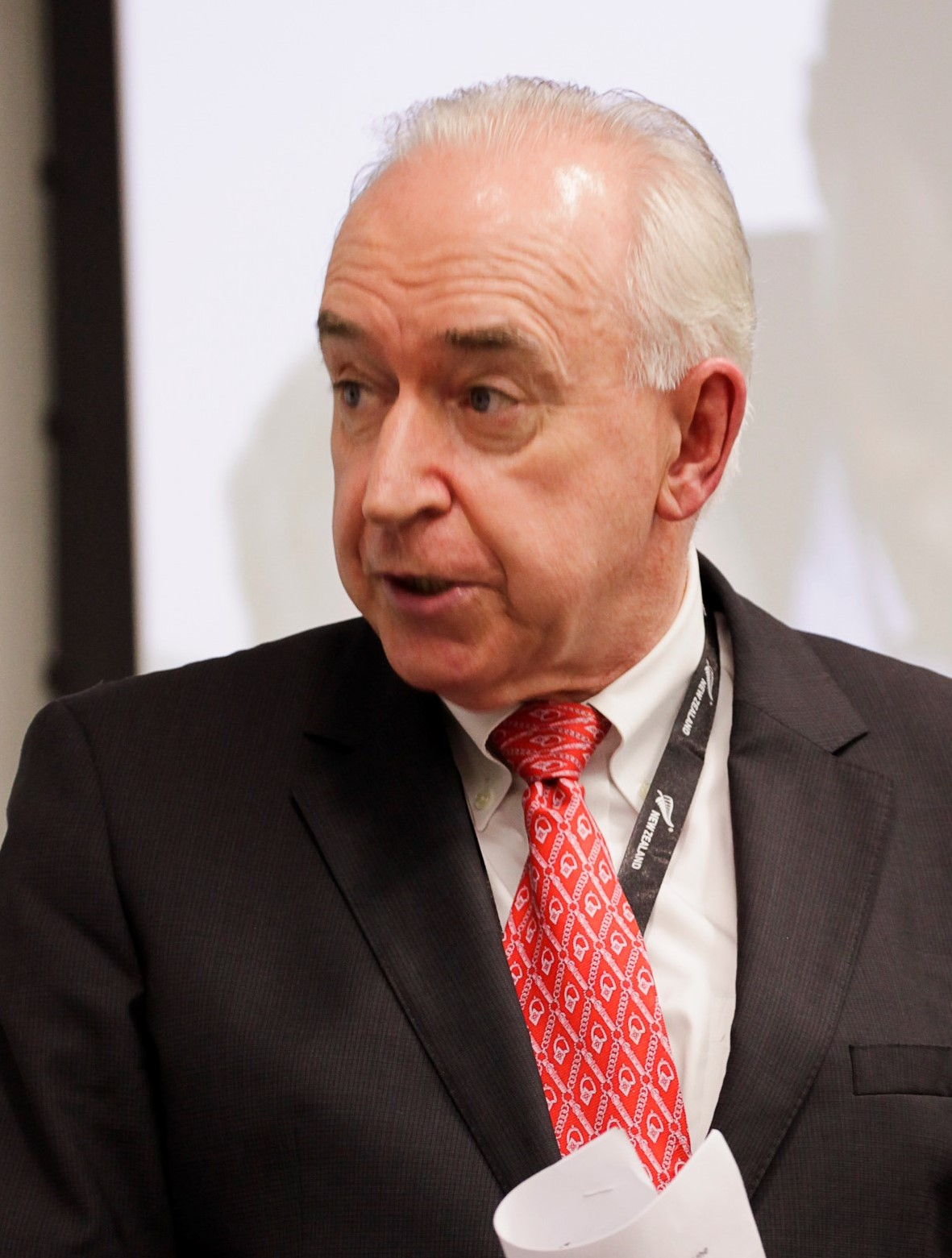
Jim McLay, then Minister of Justice, introduced the act to Parliament

Prior to 1982, official information was assumed to be the property of the government, not the people. Under the Official Secrets Act 1951, disclosure of information by public servants without specific reason and authorisation was a criminal offence. The law "positively discouraged information release". However, from the 1960s onwards, there was increasing pressure for openness. In 1962, a Royal Commission of Inquiry into state services declared that "Government administration is the public’s business, and that the people are entitled to know more than they do of what is being done, and why." The creation of the Office of the Ombudsman and changes of administrative law created a presumption that people were entitled to know the reasons for decisions made about them. Environmental campaigns such as the Save Manapouri campaign and the passage of freedom of information legislation overseas created further pressure. A freedom of information bill was introduced to parliament by opposition Labour MP Richard Prebble in 1977 but this failed to progress beyond a second reading. In 1979, the Coalition for Open Government explicitly campaigned for greater access to official information as part of its opposition to Robert Muldoon's Think Big programme.

In 1978 the government established the "Committee on Official Information" (also known as the "Danks Committee" after its chair) for the purpose of "considering the extent to which official information can be made readily available to the public". As part of this, the committee was to review the application of the Official Secrets Act 1951 and "advance appropriate recommendations on changes in policies and procedures which would contribute to the aim of freedom of information". In 1980 it reported back, recommending the replacement of the Official Secrets Act with a new Official Information Act, based on a principle of openness. In 1981 the committee released a supplementary report with recommendations about the oversight and administration of the act and the treatment of classified information. In 1982 these ideas were passed into law as the Official Information Act by the National Government. Former Prime Minister and Law Commissioner Geoffrey Palmer credits then-Minister of Justice Jim McLay for the act, saying that he managed to pass it in the face of opposition from both Prime Minister Robert Muldoon and the Treasury.

As originally enacted, the act included a clause protecting information regarding "competitive commercial activities" by the government, and included no deadline for responding to requests. Agencies merely had to respond "as soon as reasonably practicable", which led to frequent delays. Ministers could also over-rule a decision by the Ombudsman to release information simply by recording that decision in writing. The act underwent major reform in 1987 to provide further transparency. A public interest test was imposed for commercially sensitive information, the 20 working day time limit was imposed, and over-ruling the Ombudsman now required a formal Order-in-Council. Since then the act has received only minor, technical amendments, and its major features have remained unchanged.

== The act ==
=== Scope ===
The scope of the act is extremely broad compared to other international freedom of information laws, and includes all information held by any Minister in their official capacity, or by any government department or organisation (as listed in the schedules to the act or the Ombudsmen Act 1975). This includes almost all government agencies, including ministries, intelligence agencies, hospitals, universities, schools, crown entities, and state-owned enterprises. Some non-government agencies are also included, such as certain officers of parliament. The act does not apply to the courts, the Parliamentary Service, quasi-judicial agencies such as the Independent Police Conduct Authority and Inspector-General of Intelligence and Security, or to local government (which is covered by the Local Government Official Information and Meetings Act 1987).

The act applies to "information", regardless of form, not just documents, and includes "not only recorded data but also knowledge of a particular fact or state of affairs held by officers in a named organisation or Department in their official capacity". This technology-neutral definition has allowed the act to cope with the significant changes in information technology since the 1980s. Information held in an official capacity by employees, and information held by subcontractors, subsidiary companies, and unincorporated advisory bodies is all captured by the act.

=== Request process ===
The act creates a regime by which people can request and receive information held by government officials and bodies. Any person in New Zealand, or any New Zealand citizen or permanent resident, can lodge a request. Requests must specify the information they are seeking with "due particularity" and can be made in any form and communicated by any means. They can be made online, and there is no requirement for requesters to provide reasons for their request, or even their real name.

Agencies subject to the act have a statutory duty to provide reasonable assistance to requesters, and must transfer requests for information held by other bodies to the appropriate agency so that the request can be answered. Agencies must make a decision on whether to release requested information as soon as reasonably practicable, with an upper limit of 20 working days (Note: The Act defines a working day as any day other than a Saturday, a Sunday, Waitangi Day, Good Friday, Easter Monday, Anzac Day, King’s Birthday, Matariki and Labour Day; the following Monday if Waitangi Day or Anzac Day fall on a Saturday or Sunday; and all days between 25 December and 15 January.) after receiving the request, though this time-limit can be extended for large or complex requests. Organisations may charge for responding to large requests, but this is rare. Any charge set must be reasonable.

=== Withholding grounds ===
The guiding principle of the New Zealand act is the principle of availability which states: "That information shall be made available unless there is good reason for withholding it". "Good reason" is defined in the act, and is split into two categories: "conclusive reasons", which are not subject to a public interest test, and "other reasons", which must be balanced against the public interest in release. Conclusive reasons for agencies to withhold information include:

- releasing the information would compromise the national security or international relations of New Zealand. An additional clause protects the security and international relations of dependent territories such as Tokelau and states in free association such as the Cook Islands and Niue.
- the information requested was supplied by another government in confidence
- releasing the information would compromise the maintenance of the law, (including but not limited to the prevention, investigation, and detection of offences, and the right to a fair trial.)
- releasing the information would endanger a person's safety
- releasing the information would cause severe economic damage.

Other reasons to withhold information include:

Subsection	Reason
9(2)(a)	To protect the privacy of natural persons, including that of deceased natural persons.
9(2)(b)(i)	To protect information where the making available of the information would disclose a trade secret.
9(2)(b)(ii)	To protect information where the making available of the information would be likely unreasonably to prejudice the commercial position of the person who supplied or who is the subject of the information.
9(2)(ba)(i)	To protect information which is subject to an obligation of confidence or which any person has been or could be compelled to provide under the authority of any enactment, where the making available of the information would be likely to prejudice the supply of similar information, or information from the same source, and it is in the public interest that such information should continue to be supplied.
9(2)(ba)(ii)	To protect information which is subject to an obligation of confidence or which any person has been or could be compelled to provide under the authority of any enactment, where the making available of the information would be likely otherwise to damage the public interest.
9(2)(c)	To avoid prejudice to measures protecting the health or safety of members of the public.
9(2)(d)	To avoid prejudice to the substantial economic interests of New Zealand
9(2)(e)	To avoid prejudice to measures that prevent or mitigate material loss to members of the public.
9(2)(f)(i)	To maintain the constitutional conventions for the time being which protect the confidentiality of communications by or with the Sovereign or her representative.
9(2)(f)(ii)	To maintain the constitutional conventions for the time being which protect collective and individual ministerial responsibility.
9(2)(f)(iii)	To maintain the constitutional conventions for the time being which protect the political neutrality of officials.
9(2)(f)(iv)	To maintain the constitutional conventions for the time being which protect the confidentiality of advice tendered by Ministers of the Crown and officials.
9(2)(g)(i)	To maintain the effective conduct of public affairs through the free and frank expression of opinions by or between or to Ministers of the Crown or members of an organisation or officers and employees of any department or organisation in the course of their duty; or
9(2)(g)(ii)	To maintain the effective conduct of public affairs through the protection of such Ministers, members of organisations, officers, and employees from improper pressure or harassment
9(2)(h)	To maintain legal professional privilege.
9(2)(i)	To enable a Minister of the Crown or any department or organisation holding the information to carry out, without prejudice or disadvantage, commercial activities.
9(2)(j)	To enable a Minister of the Crown or any department or organisation holding the information to carry on, without prejudice or disadvantage, negotiations (including commercial and industrial negotiations).
9(2)(k)	To prevent the disclosure or use of official information for improper gain or improper advantage.

These reasons must always be balanced against the public interest in release. The Ombudsman has extensive guidance available on public interest factors which may apply to any particular request, including transparency, participation, accountability, and the administration of justice. Only limited withholding grounds apply to requests for internal rules affecting decisions, or to requests by individuals for the reasons for decisions about them.

Finally, official information requests can also be refused for administrative reasons. These include:

- releasing the information would contravene another act of Parliament
- releasing the information would constitute contempt of court or Parliament
- the requested information relates to criminal disclosure and can be sought under the Criminal Disclosures Act 2008
- the requested information does not exist or cannot be found.
- releasing the information would require substantial collation or research
- the requested information is already publicly available or will soon be made publicly available.
- the requested information is not held by the requested agency, and it does not believe any agency subject to the act holds such information
- the request is frivolous or vexatious, or the information requested is trivial. (e.g. a request to verify that MP David Seymour is not a hologram.)

Requests may be refused only in part, and information made available as redacted documents. Where any part of a request is refused, agencies are required to provide reasons, and advise the requester that they have the right to ask the Ombudsman to investigate whether or not that decision is justified under the provisions of the act.

=== Oversight ===
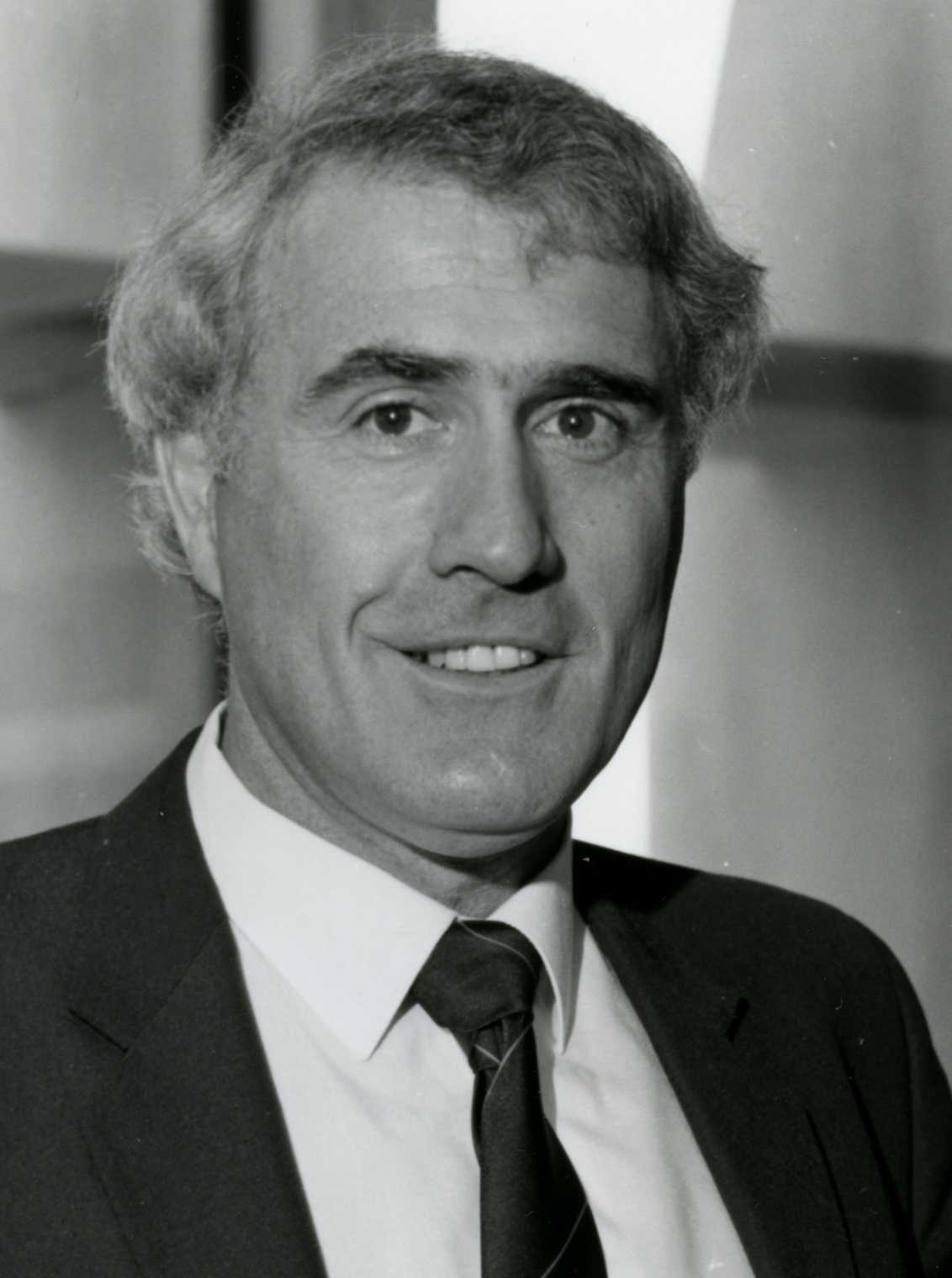
Geoffrey Palmer strengthened the act, and restricted the Ministerial veto provision

Most decisions made under the act can be appealed to the Ombudsman, including decisions to withhold or charge for information, or extend a request deadline. Failure to respond to a request (known as "delay deemed refusal") can also be appealed. Decisions to transfer requests are not specifically mentioned, and so can only be investigated where they are made by agencies, using the Ombudsman's general jurisdiction under the Ombudsmen Act 1975. Transfer decisions by Ministers can not be appealed or investigated.

If they find a complaint is justified, the Ombudsman can make formal recommendations, including to release information. These recommendations are legally binding upon agencies, imposing a public duty to implement them. Initially such a recommendation could be overturned by a Minister giving a directive in writing, but in 1987 the act was amended so that vetoing an Ombudsman's decision required an order in council. No Ombudsman's decision has been vetoed since the amendment was passed.

In addition to the complaints procedure under the act, the general procedures of government agencies (but not Ministers) in handling OIA requests are subject to the Ombudsman's jurisdiction under the Ombudsmen Act 1975. This has led to a series of "practice investigations", aimed at improving general OIA practice across government.

=== Other provisions ===
The act originally contained provisions for individuals to access and correct personal information about themselves. These provisions were replaced by the Privacy Act 1993, but a legacy provision still covers corporate entities.

The act requires the Ministry of Justice to produce a directory of official information, setting out the functions, structure, contact details, and information held by each agency subject to the act.

The act provides immunity from civil and criminal proceedings for good faith decisions to release information under the act. This includes immunity from defamation, breach of copyright, and breach of confidence, and covers the crown, public servants, and the original authors of any information released.

The act initially included the creation and functions of an Information Authority, charged with managing the implementation of the act. The initial members were Alan Danks (who had chaired the Danks Committee), Ian Lithgow and Shirley Maddock. These provisions expired in 1988, and the authority was dissolved.

== Impact ==
Initially dismissed as a "nine-day wonder" by Prime Minister Robert Muldoon, the act has since been recognised as a part of New Zealand's unwritten constitution. The Court of Appeal has said that "the permeating importance of the act is such that it is entitled to be ranked as a constitutional measure". The Law Commission has said that it is "central to New Zealand’s constitutional arrangements". It has significantly changed the culture of government, leading to a culture of openness under which a great deal of information is made public as a matter of routine. It is seen as having enabled other transparency reforms, such as the Privacy Act, Public Finance Act, and Fiscal Responsibility Act. The expectation of eventual public scrutiny is also believed to have significantly improved the quality of advice to government.

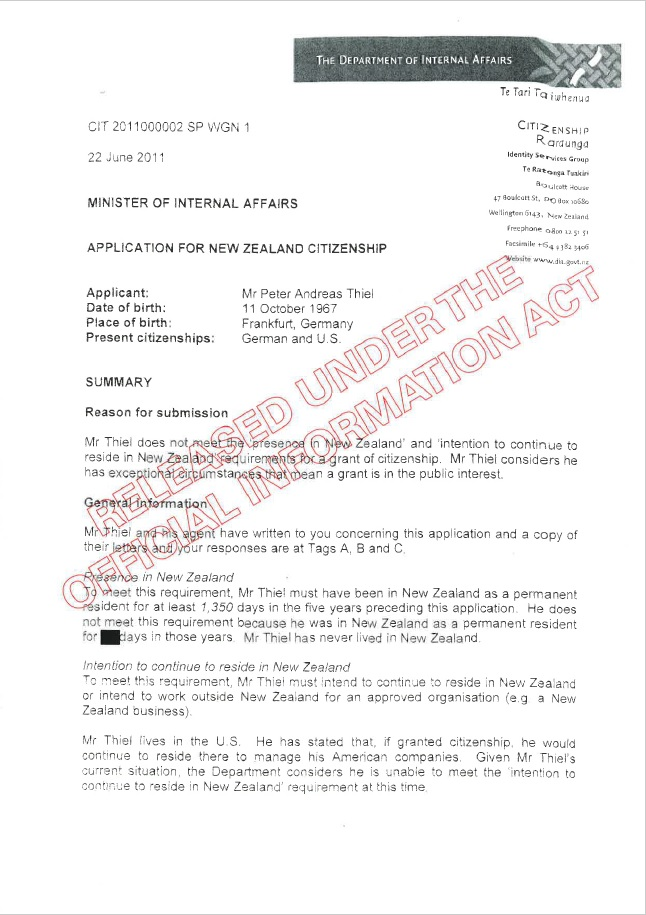
OIA requests have released information such as this briefing to the Minister of Internal Affairs on billionaire Peter Thiel's application for New Zealand citizenship.

Approximately 45,000 requests are made under the act each year, with over 90% of them answered within statutory timeframes. The act is routinely used by political parties, journalists, lobbyists and individuals to gain a wide range of information, from government policy and statistics to information about decision-making, and "useful – and even embarrassing – information is regularly released". However, there has been constant friction between requesters complaining that information is disclosed reluctantly and state agencies concerned about the time and cost of meeting requests. There is evidence that there are significant differences in treatment between uncontroversial and politically sensitive requests, and frequent claims in the media that the law is being violated. Then-Prime Minister John Key admitted explicitly delaying the release of information to suit the interests of the government, while in another case the New Zealand Security Intelligence Service was found to have provided a speedy release to a blogger in order to embarrass the leader of the opposition.

Notable information released under the act includes:

- In the leadup to the 2005 New Zealand general election the government was forced to reveal the costings of its interest-free student-loan policy, with the Ombudsman completing the investigation in less than a week in order to ensure the information was released in time for the election.
- In 2010, details of Ministerial credit card spending from 2003 to 2008 was released under the act. The information embarrassed several former Ministers, including Shane Jones, who was revealed as having used his Ministerial credit card to purchase hotel pornography. Such information is now proactively released every quarter by the government.
- In 2016 the Ombudsman ruled that legal advice to the Ministry of Health on the interpretation of the Human Assisted Reproductive Technology Act 2004 should be made public, as the protection of legal professional privilege was outweighed by the public interest in knowing how the law would be interpreted and applied by officials.
- In 2017 documents released under the act revealed that billionaire Peter Thiel had been granted New Zealand citizenship in 2011 under an "exceptional circumstances" clause despite having spent only 12 days in New Zealand, and stating that he had no intention of living there. The "exceptional circumstances" cited by the Minister was that Thiel was very rich, leading to allegations that he had effectively bought his citizenship.
- In 2018 the New Zealand Defence Force was forced to confirm that the location of an Afghanistan village in the book Hit & Run was the same place where an SAS raid, Operation Burnham took place. The SAS raid was subsequently the subject of a government inquiry.

== Proposals for reform ==
The act has been reviewed repeatedly over its lifetime, and there have been several suggestions for reform.

In 1992 the New Zealand Law Commission conducted a limited review of the operation of the act, and specifically its time limits, the processes around large and broadly defined requests, charging provisions, and the ability of the executive to veto release. The review did not report back until 1997 due to the transition to MMP and recommended reducing the time limit for requests to 15 working days as well as a number of technical and administrative reforms. A few of the latter were implemented via a Statutes Amendment Bill in 2003, but core recommendations were not.

The Law Commission reviewed the act again in 2012, and recommended expanding the scope of the act to cover the parliamentary service and remove inconsistencies, replacing the Ombudsman with a specialist Information Commissioner, and expanding the act to cover proactive release, as well as a number of administrative and technical changes. This was to be implemented through a rewritten act, which would cover both central and local government. The government adopted a number of minor technical reforms, but rejected any significant change.

A review by Chief Ombudsman Beverley Wakem in 2015 focused on the implementation of the act by government agencies. It found no evidence of political interference in the handling of requests but noted that nearly 80% of senior managers had never received any training in responding to OIA requests and that most government agencies did not have proactive policies for the timely release of information. It made numerous recommendations for improving agency OIA practices, but did not recommend any changes to the legislation itself.

In 2018 the New Zealand Council for Civil Liberties made a number of recommendations for reform of the act, including expanding coverage to Parliament, companies in which the government has majority control, and quasi-judicial agencies such as the Independent Police Complaints Authority; greater proactive release; limiting commercial and legal withholding grounds; and various measures to reduce political interference with the operation of the act. They recommended oversight by a specialist Open Government Commission, and criminal penalties for officials who subvert the law by destroying, falsifying or hiding official information.

In 2018 the government included a commitment to investigate whether to conduct a formal review of the act in its Open Government Partnership action plan. Originally this was planned as a "targeted engagement" consulting handpicked stakeholders, but after a public outcry a public consultation was held in March 2019. The decision on whether to review the act was then pushed back. In July 2020 Justice Minister Andrew Little announced that the act would be rewritten. In January 2021 his replacement, Kris Faafoi, said that a review would be delayed until "later in this parliamentary term".

== See also ==
- Local Government Official Information and Meetings Act 1987
- Right to privacy in New Zealand
- New Zealand Chief Ombudsman
- Coalition for Open Government
