= Official Secrets Act 1951 =

Act of Parliament in New Zealand

The Official Secrets Act 1951 (long title: "An Act to make better provision in respect of official secrets") was a statute of the New Zealand Parliament. It was based on the UK Official Secrets Act 1911, and provided for criminal penalties for espionage and unauthorised releases of government information.

The only prosecution under the espionage provisions of the Act was that of Bill Sutch, who was unsuccessfully prosecuted in 1974-5 following a series of clandestine meetings with KGB agent Dimitri Rasgovorov, an official of the Soviet Union's embassy in Wellington. At the trial the Security Intelligence Service was unable to provide details of what information had supposedly been passed, and Sutch was subsequently acquitted by the jury.

The Act was repealed in 1983 by the Official Information Act 1982.
