= Dorothy Neal White =

New Zealand librarian, writer and collector

Dorothy Mary Neal White QSO (née Neal, later Ballantyne, 22 December 1915 – 12 February 1995) was a notable New Zealand librarian and writer.

== Biography ==
Dorothy Mary Neal was born in Christchurch, New Zealand, in 1915. Her parents were Henry Neal and Florence, née Rhodes. She was educated at Avonside Girls' High School followed by Canterbury College. In 1933, she became a library assistant at the Canterbury Public Library, and in 1936 she became children's librarian at the Dunedin Public Libraries. She later worked there again from 1957 as head of children's services until her retirement in 1974.

When in 1939 Neal married a noted Dunedin second-hand-book seller, Richard (Dick) Desmond White, she continued to work under her maiden name as the City Council required women to resign on marriage. After the death of her first husband in 1967, she married Dunedin doctor Robert Edmund Ballantyne in 1968.

In the 1994 Queen's Birthday Honours, she was appointed a Companion of the Queen's Service Order for community service.

== Legacy ==
The Dorothy Neal White Collection, held by the National Library of New Zealand contains over 8,000 titles of pre-1940s children's literature.
