= Peter Trapski =

New Zealand jurist (1935–2025)

Sir Peter Trapski KNZM CBE
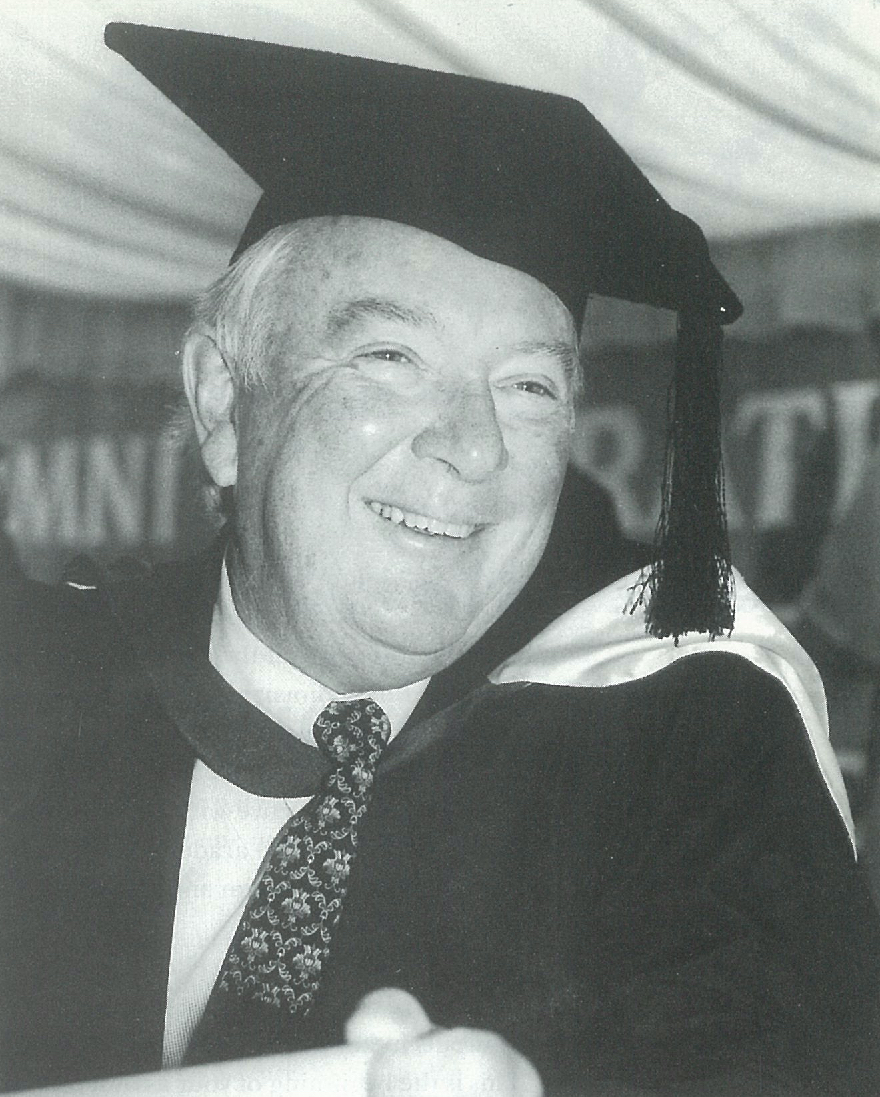
- Trapski in 1998

2nd Chief District Court judge
- In office 1985–1989
- Preceded by: Desmond Sullivan
- Succeeded by: Silvia Cartwright

Personal details
- Born: Peter John Trapski; 12 October 1935 Ōtorohanga, New Zealand
- Died: 20 February 2025 (aged 89)
- Spouse: Helen Mary Christie (m. 1960)
- Children: 5
- Education: St Patrick's College, Silverstream
- Alma mater: Victoria University College
- Profession: Barrister and solicitor

Sir Peter John Trapski KNZM CBE (12 October 1935 – 20 February 2025) was a New Zealand jurist. He served as chief District Court judge between 1985 and 1989, and was a member of the Waitangi Tribunal from 1989 until 1993.

== Background ==
Trapski was born in Ōtorohanga on 12 October 1935, the son of John and Madoline Trapski, and was educated at St Patrick's College, Silverstream. He went on to study law at Victoria University College, graduating LLB in 1959.

In 1960, Trapski married Helen Mary Christie, and the couple had five children. He died on 20 February 2025, at the age of 89.

== Legal career ==
Trapski practised as a barrister and solicitor from 1960 until 1972 when he was appointed a stipendary magistrate. In 1980, when district courts replaced magistrates' courts, he became a district court judge. In 1981, he was appointed principal Family Court judge, and in 1985 chief District Court judge, serving in that role until 1989. From 1989 to 1993, he was a member of the Waitangi Tribunal. He chaired the War Pensions Appeal Board from 1989, the Dairy Herd Improvement Tribunal from 1992, and the Judicial Control Authority for Racing from 1994 to 1995.

Commissioned in the New Zealand Army in 1956, Trapski was appointed colonel-commandant of the New Zealand Legal Service in 1989, deputy judge advocate-general in 1990, and judge advocate-general in 1995.

Trapski was a council member of the Commonwealth Magistrates' and Judges' Association from 1985 to 1989, including a term as vice president between 1988 and 1989.

After retiring from the bench in 1989, Trapski completed a Master of Business Studies degree in dispute resolution at Massey University, graduating in 1998. The topic of his research was disputes in the sharemilking industry.

== Honours and awards ==
In 1977, Trapski was awarded the Queen Elizabeth II Silver Jubilee Medal. In the 1989 Queen's Birthday Honours, he was appointed a Commander of the Order of the British Empire. He was made a Distinguished Companion of the New Zealand Order of Merit, for services to the law and the community, in the 2003 New Year Honours, and following the restoration of titular honours by the New Zealand government in 2009, he accepted redesignation as a Knight Companion of the New Zealand Order of Merit.

In 1997, Trapski was made a Knight of the Order of St Sylvester by Pope John Paul II. He was elected a Fellow of the Arbitrators' and Mediators' Institute of New Zealand in 1990, and a Fellow of the Chartered Institute of Arbitrators (London) in 1992.
