= New Zealand Parole Board =

The New Zealand Parole Board is an independent statutory body established in 2002 that considers offenders for early release or parole from prison. The Board's task "is to undertake an assessment of the risk that long-term sentenced offenders might pose to the safety of the community if they were to be released before the end of their sentence".

The Board reviews all prisoners serving sentences of more than two years (defined in the Corrections Act as 'long term') – after the prisoner has served one third of their sentence. However in certain cases, the sentencing judge may designate a longer minimum non-parole period. Short-term prisoners (on sentences of less than two years) are not required to appear before the Parole Board; they are automatically released after serving half their sentence. In other words, an offender sentenced to 18 months in prison will be released after nine months.

For long term prisoners released by the Board, the Board also sets release conditions, such as a requirement to live at a specific address, or not to consume alcohol or drugs. Once the conditions have been set, it becomes the responsibility of Community Corrections to manage the offender for the period of time the conditions apply. If an offender breaches any of his or her conditions when released before the end of their sentence, Corrections may apply to the Board for them to be recalled to prison to complete their full sentence.

== History ==
As a British colony, New Zealand adopted the penal system common in Britain and the country’s first jails were established in the 1840s. At that time, prisoners were crammed together regardless of their age, gender, mental health problems or crimes. Conditions were harsh and based on the concepts of retribution and deterrence rather than rehabilitation. When the country was divided into provinces in 1853, the administration of prisons was controlled by provincial governments. In 1876 the provinces were abolished and the colonial government established a standardised national prison system. At this time in New Zealand's history, there was no concept of parole or early release.

In 1881 an authoritarian army officer, Colonel Arthur Hume, was appointed as the first Inspector-General of prisons (and later Commissioner of Police). He started a major prison-building programme and advocated for the introduction of the Habitual Criminals Act passed in 1906 "for the indeterminate detention of incorrigible offenders". He also introduced an early version of parole whereby prisoners were given credit for good behaviour and hard work that could lead to earlier release. Managing released prisoners required a form of probation service. An early version of the New Zealand Probation Service was introduced in 1886.

Hume retired in 1909, allowing Minister of Justice Sir John Findlay to introduce a more rehabilitative approach to the treatment of prisoners. The next year, the Crimes Amendment Act established Prison Boards which determined the length of prison sentences. If the local board considered a prisoner to be "reformed" they could be released on probation, although the board could also keep "habitual criminals" in jail indefinitely. But meaningful change was slow. In 1928, H.G. Mason, who eventually became the Minister of Justice, said in parliament that it was the function of the prisons "to imprison, to flog, to hang, not to care for a man in any other way".

Public awareness of the need for prison reform grew stronger in the 1940s, but little changed until John Robson and Sam Barnett headed up the Department of Justice in the 1950s and 1960s. They engaged psychologists in the treatment of prisoners for the first time, introduced release on work parole for inmates near the end of their sentences, and in the process, "rejuvenated the Prison Parole Board". Today the Corrections Department continues to use psychologists to write reports on prisoners appearing for parole and to assess their risk of re-offending.

During this time prisons and parole were still administered by 17 District Prison Boards and the National Parole Board.

In the 1990s a number of high-profile violent crimes led, once again, to calls for longer prison sentences and a more punitive approach. In 2002 the Parole Act was passed, setting up today's Parole Board. In the same year, the Sentencing Act 2002 introduced longer prison sentences for many crimes as well as stricter conditions for those facing parole. In 2009, chief justice Dame Sian Elias noted that during her tenure there had been a substantial shift in the focus of criminal justice, placing emphasis on the victims of crime.

== Notable members ==
Retired High Court Judge Jan-Marie Doogue is the current Chairperson of the New Zealand Parole Board, beginning from 15 July 2025. She has more than four decades of experience in the legal profession, including a distinguished judicial career in both the District and High Courts.

Chairpersons
	Name	Portrait	Term of office	
1	Justice Tony Ellis CNZM	2002	2005	
2	Judge Sir David Carruthers KNZM		2005	2012
3	Justice Warwick Gendall CNZM		2012	2018
4	Justice Sir Ron Young KNZM		2018	2025
5	Justice Jan-Marie Doogue KNZM		2025	Incumbent

Other members have included Dame June Jackson, in 1991–2019, and Marion Frater, deputy chair since 2007.

== Function ==
The Board's role in the criminal justice system is to undertake an assessment of the risk that long-term sentenced offenders might pose to the safety of the community if they were to be released before the end of their sentence. "Long term" means prisoners given a sentence of two years or more. Prisoners on sentences of less than two years are automatically released after serving half their sentence and are not required to appear before the Parole Board at all.

When considering whether or not to release a prisoner before the end of their sentence, the Board is bound by Section 7 of the Parole Act, which states, "When making decisions about, or in any way relating to, the release of an offender, the paramount consideration for the Board in every case is the safety of the community." More specifically the Board is required to assess whether an offender poses an "undue risk", which includes consideration of "the likelihood of further offending" as well as "the nature and seriousness of any likely subsequent offending".

=== Eligibility ===
Under the Sentencing Act 2002, long-term prisoners become eligible to attend their first parole hearing after serving one third of their sentence – unless they were given a longer minimum non-parole period by the sentencing judge.

However, the board has become increasingly cautious since the convicted murderer Graeme Burton was released on parole in 2006 and went on to commit a second murder. The board conducted a review of its decision to release Burton, leading to a much more structured approach to its decision-making for prisoners from then on.

As a result, the Board now seldom considers the release of any prisoner until they have successfully completed a rehabilitation programme that addresses the lifestyle factors that contributed to their offending. The limited availability of rehabilitation programmes in prison (despite an increase in the last few years) means there are long waiting lists and very few prisoners even start a programme until they have completed at least one third of their sentence. Even if a programme is available, the Corrections Department is reluctant to let prisoners start one until they have completed two thirds of their sentence.

This has a significant impact on the number of prisoners released on parole. In 2013, the Board held 6093 parole hearings and released only 1462 prisoners – 24% of the total, the lowest percentage since 2006.

=== Eligibility when sentenced to life ===
Until 2008, for those sentenced to life in prison in New Zealand, the "standard" minimum non-parole period was 10 years. In 2002, the Sentencing Act allowed judges to set increasingly lengthy non-parole periods and required a minimum non-parole period of at least 17 years if aggravating factors were involved. This is evident in the 30-year non-parole period given to William Bell, who murdered three people at the Mt Wellington-Panmure RSA. This is currently the second longest non-parole period handed down, the longest being Brenton Tarrant, who was handed a life sentence without parole after murdering 51 people in a terrorism attack in March 2019.

Those sentenced to life in prison may still be released on parole eventually. But the sentence is still 'life' and there is no guarantee they will ever get out. Former Board chairman Sir David Carruthers says that murderers and those given indefinite sentences will remain behind bars until they are no longer considered a risk to the community. If they are released, they remain subject to release conditions for the rest of their life and can be recalled if they break their conditions in any way.

=== Parole conditions ===
Having served the minimum non-parole period of their sentence, if the Board feels that an offender no longer poses an undue risk, it may agree to their release but sets conditions which are then monitored by Community Corrections. The offender remains on parole until the end of their sentence and may be recalled to prison for breaching any of the conditions.

The Board also sets release conditions for offenders who have served their entire sentence; they are not on parole once they are released. These conditions last for six months beyond the sentence end date. If an offender breaches those conditions after completing his sentence, they cannot be recalled by the Board, but can be charged for the breach by the police or Community Corrections. It is then up to the district court to impose a new sentence – which, depending on the seriousness of the breach, may or may not be a prison term.

In 2013, 322 prisoners were recalled.

=== Home detention ===
Prior to 2007, home detention began with a prison sentence. In addition to releasing prisoners on parole, the Board also used to hear applications from those prisoners who were entitled to apply for home detention. However, after the Parole Amendment Act of 2007 came into effect, home detention could be imposed directly by the sentencing judge as a community-based sentence. At the same time, the Board was given the power to impose "residential restrictions" on parolees – a new condition of release whereby the offender is subject to an electronic monitoring regime and must stay at the approved residence at all times, or at times specified by the Board. In many respects this is very similar to home detention, but is imposed as a release condition towards the end of a prison sentence rather than being a community based sentence in itself.

== How cases are considered ==
The Board is made up of approximately 40 members, both judges and non-judicial members. Board members have a wide variety of life experience. In 2009, four members of the Parole Board had family members who had been murdered.

Hearings are conducted with panels of three members, usually with a judge convening each panel. The other two members of the panel are usually non-judicial members. 'Lifers' and other serious cases are often considered by a larger group of board members known as the "Extended Board", which meets most months, through a split of face-to-face hearings in prisons around the country, and hearings by audio-visual link.

Offenders may be represented by counsel at hearings, but board members tend to direct most of their questions to the prisoner.

=== All available information ===
When considering an offender for parole, the board's primary concern is whether the offender presents an undue risk to the safety of the community. To assess this, board members consider all the available information on the offender including their current and previous convictions, the summary of facts about their current offending, the judge's sentencing notes and pre-sentence reports from the Department of Corrections. The board will also consider prison reports explaining what rehabilitative programmes or other activities the prisoner has been engaged in during their sentence. For some offenders, the board will also request a psychological report.

=== Risk assessment ===
Corrections psychologists use a mathematical formula known as the RoC*RoI to assess every prisoner's risk of re-offending. RoC*RoI stands for Risk of re-Conviction multiplied by the Risk of re-Imprisonment. The formula is based on dozens of data inputs such as the prisoner's gender, current age, age when first convicted, total number of convictions, offence type, number of times in prison, and total time spent in prison. These are known as "static predictors" as there is nothing the offender can do to change them. The information leads to a score (between zero and 99%) that the prisoner will re-offend and return to prison which assists the Parole Board in its deliberations.

=== Victims ===
Victims also have certain rights to give information to, and receive information from, the board regarding the person who offended against them. If victims wish to attend, the board will hold separate meetings with them – so that victim and offender never have to meet (unless they both want to).

Some victims feel compelled to make submissions before the Parole Board to oppose the offender's release. The mother of pizza delivery man Michael Choy, murdered by a group of six youths in 2001, has made submissions every year. In 2005 she was quoted as saying: "The heinous circumstances of this crime are always in my thoughts as my life continues to revolve around writing submissions and attending parole hearings." By 2010, she had attended 28 victim meetings.

In 2012, former Justice Minister Judith Collins introduced a Bill to Parliament to cut the frequency of hearings so that victims of crime would not have to "relive their ordeal year after year". While victims do not attend parole hearings, the process of parole can still be extremely distressing. Victim meetings at not held in prisons and the offenders are never present. In over 90% of cases, the victims of serious crimes where the offender has been sent to prison choose not to attend.

Victims registered to receive victim notifications will automatically be told when the relevant offenders are having a parole hearing or hearing to impose special conditions on an Extended Supervision Order. A registered victim has the right to make a written and/or oral submission also to the board. The Parole Board must consider these submissions before making a decision. The Parole Board may show the submission to the offender, after removing any contact details.

Registered victims have the right to ask for certain information from Corrections to assist in making submissions.

If the offender has been convicted of a serious sexual or violent crime the Department of Corrections may apply for an Extended Supervision Order to monitor them after they have been released from prison. Registered victims can make a submission to the court on an Extended Supervision Order application.

== Impact of sentencing policy on numbers released ==
The prison population increased substantially in the latter half of the twentieth century. On 30 June 2002, there were 6,048 New Zealanders in prison. Ten years later there were 8,618 – an increase of 42% – which has led to a significant increase in the Board's workload. In 2011, the Board saw 4,938 offenders. A total of 1542 offenders were granted parole which is 31% of all offenders seen by the Board. The number of parolees being managed in the community has doubled from about 800 in 1999 to 1600 in 2010.

In the last ten years there has been a 50% increase in the number of long-term sentences imposed each year. Despite the increase, only about 7% of prisoners appearing before the board are on an indeterminate sentence of life or preventive detention. In 2009, 440 murderers were serving life sentences in New Zealand prisons and another 241 prisoners were on indefinite sentences – meaning they are held until the Board feels they are safe to release (preventive detention). The majority of those sentenced to preventive detention are child sex offenders.

The increase in the imposition of long term sentences (combined with Corrections' reluctance to allow prisoners onto rehabilitation programmes until completing two thirds of their sentence) means the percentage of prisoners getting released on parole has dropped markedly. Between 2007 and 2011, the percentage of prisoners released on parole varied only marginally between 28% and 31%. In 2012 and 2013, this figure was down to 24%.

== Effectiveness of parole ==
Overseas studies have shown that managed release on parole with a right of recall is three to four times more successful in preventing re-offending than automatic release at end of sentence. Judge David Carruthers, a former Chairman of the Parole Board says "Ultimately the success of a person on parole comes down to the support they have. Those with very good family and community support are most likely to succeed."

=== New Zealand's recidivism rate ===
The reality is that many, if not most of those in prison, do not come from supportive families. They tend to come from backgrounds where there has been parental conflict, harsh discipline, neglect, various forms of psychological, physical or sexual abuse and alcohol and drug addiction – combined with "poverty, poor housing, instability, association with delinquent peers and unemployment". Offenders from this kind of background often re-offend and return to prison quite quickly – as reflected in New Zealand's high rates of recidivism. Approximately 43 percent of prisoners – and 65 percent of prisoners under 20 – reoffend within a year of their release. Although reoffending doesn't always lead to imprisonment, about a quarter of inmates return to prison within 12 months. After five years, more than half are back inside.

=== Shortage of halfway houses ===
For prisoners alienated from their families, halfway houses may provide alternative community support. Canada has hundreds of halfway houses funded by the Correctional Service of Canada allowing 60% of prisoners to receive support with reintegration. New Zealand has two half way houses partially funded by Corrections – Moana House in Dunedin which has 17 beds and Salisbury St Foundation in Christchurch with 13 beds. This allows less than 1% of the 9,000 prisoners released in New Zealand each year to access supported accommodation undermining the Parole Board's ability to reintegrate prisoners successfully.

=== 2009 Auditor General's report ===
The Board's effectiveness is also dependent on how well the Probation Service manages parolees. In 2009 the Auditor General, Kevin Brady, examined the management of 100 cases of offenders on parole and released a critical report of the way Probation had handled these cases. The Auditor General deliberately included 52 offenders who were considered to pose a high risk to the public. In his report Mr Brady wrote: "In most of those 100 case files the Department had not followed one or more of its own sentence management requirements...we concluded that the Department was not managing these cases adequately." The report was released soon after Corrections claimed it had improved its parole management following its disastrous mishandling of Graeme Burton's case. Since the report was released, the Probation Service has taken on more staff and tightened up its procedures. In October 2010, the general manager of Probation Services, Katrina Casey, claimed that 96% of parolees were now being managed correctly.
