= Paula Rebstock =

New Zealand civil servant

Dame Paula Rebstock DNZM
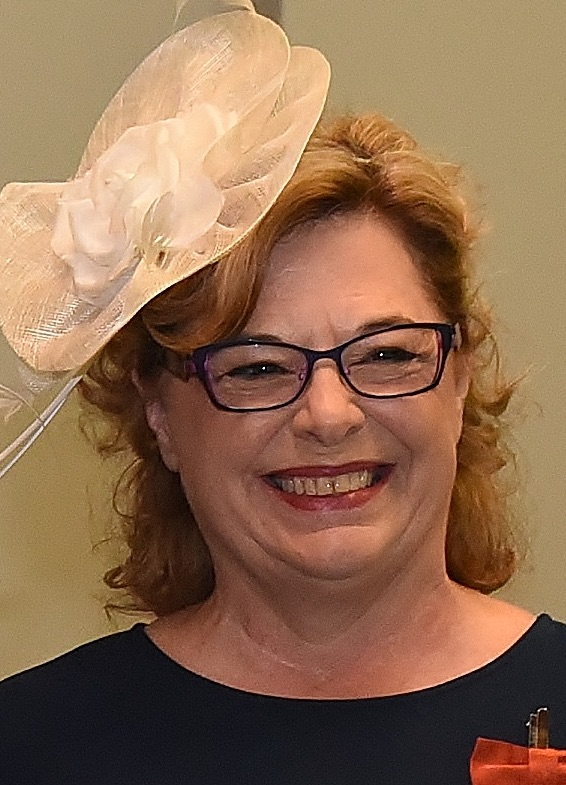
- Rebstock in 2016

Chair of the New Zealand Commerce Commission
- In office 2003–2009
- Preceded by: John Belgrave
- Succeeded by: Mark Berry

Personal details
- Born: 1 September 1960 (age 66) Montana, United States
- Spouse: Ulf Schoefisch
- Education: University of Oregon (B.A/B.S.); London School of Economics (MSc)

Dame Paula Rae Rebstock DNZM (born 1 September 1960) is an Auckland-based consultant and company director who served as the Chair of the New Zealand Commerce Commission until March 2009. Originally from Montana in the United States, Rebstock has lived in New Zealand since 1987.

== Education ==
Rebstock has a double degree in international relations and economics from the University of Oregon, and a master's degree in Economics from the London School of Economics.

== Career ==
After graduation she initially worked in New York before moving to New Zealand in 1987, when she was employed by the Treasury as an economist. She served in the Department of the Prime Minister and Cabinet as an economics advisor and subsequently as General Manager Policy with the Department of Labour.

In August 1998 she was appointed as an Associate Commissioner of the Commerce Commission, becoming Chair in 2003. She was re-appointed as Chair in 2006 until 2009.

== Honours ==
In the 2009 Queen's Birthday Honours, Rebstock was appointed a Companion of the New Zealand Order of Merit, for public services, particularly as chair of the Commerce Commission. She was promoted to Dame Companion of the same order, for services to the State, in the 2016 New Year Honours.

== Personal life ==
Rebstock is married to Ulf Schoefisch; the couple has two daughters.

Government offices
Preceded by John Belgrave	Chair of the Commerce Commission; 2003–2009	Succeeded by Mark Berry
