= John Robertson (ombudsman) =

Chief Ombudsman of New Zealand (1925-2001)

Sir John Robertson KCMG CBE

President of the International Ombudsman Institute
- In office 1992–1994

4th New Zealand Chief Ombudsman
- In office 21 December 1986 – 14 December 1994
- Preceded by: Lester Castle
- Succeeded by: Brian Elwood

Personal details
- Born: 3 August 1925
- Died: 1 September 2001 (aged 76)

Sir John Fraser Robertson KCMG CBE (3 August 1925 – 1 September 2001) was the Chief Ombudsman of New Zealand from 1986 to 1994. In this role, he was responsible for investigating complaints against central and local government agencies, including Ministers of the Crown.

== Career ==
Robertson began his career as a draughting cadet in the Lands and Survey Department in 1942. He served with the Royal New Zealand Air Force in the Pacific during the Second World War. After returning to the public service he qualified as a chartered accountant. He was a State Services Commissioner, Secretary of Defence and Secretary for Justice before being made an Ombudsman. He was appointed an Ombudsman in 1984, and in 1986 became Chief Ombudsman, holding office until 1994. He was a Director of the International Ombudsman Institute (IOI) from 1988 and President of the IOI from 1992 until 1994.

Robertson was appointed a Commander of the Order of the British Empire in the 1982 Queen's Birthday Honours. In the 1994 Queen's Birthday Honours, he was made a Knight Commander of the Order of St Michael and St George.

Government offices
Preceded by Lester Castle	New Zealand Chief Ombudsman; 1986–1994	Succeeded by Brian Elwood
