= Dryden Spring =

New Zealand businessman and author (born 1939)

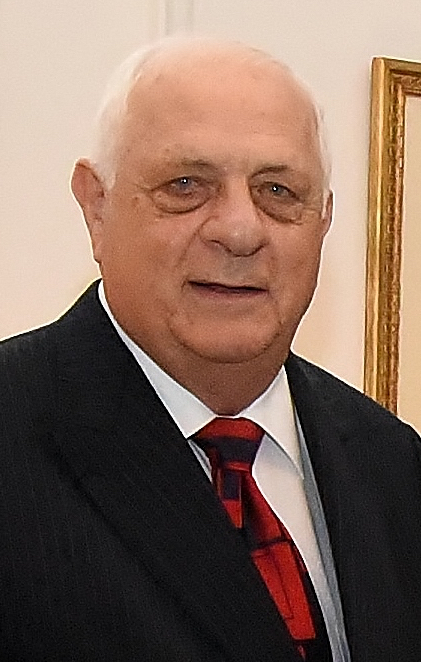
Spring in 2017

Sir Dryden Thomas Spring (born 6 October 1939) is a New Zealand businessman and author who was chairman of the New Zealand Dairy Board from 1989 to 1998, chairman of New Zealand Dairy Group from 1982 to 1987, and chairman of ANZ New Zealand from 2007 to 2012. He is the Author of "From Walton to the World"

== Early life and family ==
Spring was born in Waitara on 6 October 1939 into a farming family, and was educated at Matamata College. After leaving school, he worked various jobs and saved until he was able to buy a farm at Walton in Waikato. He is married to Margaret, Lady Spring.

== Career ==
Spring became president of the New Zealand Sharemilkers' Association in 1967, president of Waikato Federated Farmers in 1972, and a director of New Zealand Dairy Group in 1973. Spring was chairman of ANZ National Bank from April 2007 to June 2012, having formerly served as a director of the National Bank of New Zealand Limited.

Spring formerly held a number of directorships including: Nufarm Ltd; Maersk NZ Ltd; Affco Ltd; Fletcher Building Ltd; Sky City Entertainment Group Ltd; Port of Tauranga Ltd; and Northport Ltd. He was deputy chairman of Goodman Fielder Ltd; chairman of Ericcson NZ Ltd; chairman of Tenon Ltd; deputy chairman of Ports Of Auckland Ltd; and deputy chairman of the Rural Banking and Finance Corporation of New Zealand. He was also a member of the APEC Eminent Persons Group, which in 1993 drafted the APEC Vision of Free and Open Trade in the Asia Pacific; a member of the APEC Business Advisory Council; chairman of the Asia New Zealand Foundation; and a founding trustee of the New Zealand Business and Parliamentary Trust.

== Honours and awards ==
In 1973, Spring was chosen as New Zealand's outstanding young man of the year by New Zealand Jaycees. In 2003, he was awarded the Holden Lifetime Achievement Award for service to the dairy industry. He is a Distinguished Fellow of the Institute of Directors in New Zealand, a Life Member of Waikato Federated Farmers, and a Distinguished Fellow of Massey University Academy of Agriculture. He was appointed a Paul Harris Fellow by Rotary International in 2011, and was inducted into the New Zealand Business Hall of Fame in 2013. In 2022 he was inducted into the Waikato Business Hall of Fame.

Spring was awarded the New Zealand 1990 Commemoration Medal in 1990. In the 1994 Queen's Birthday Honours, he was appointed a Knight Bachelor, for services to the dairy industry.

Spring has been conferred two honorary doctorates: by Massey University in 2000 (DSc); and by the University of Waikato in 2014.

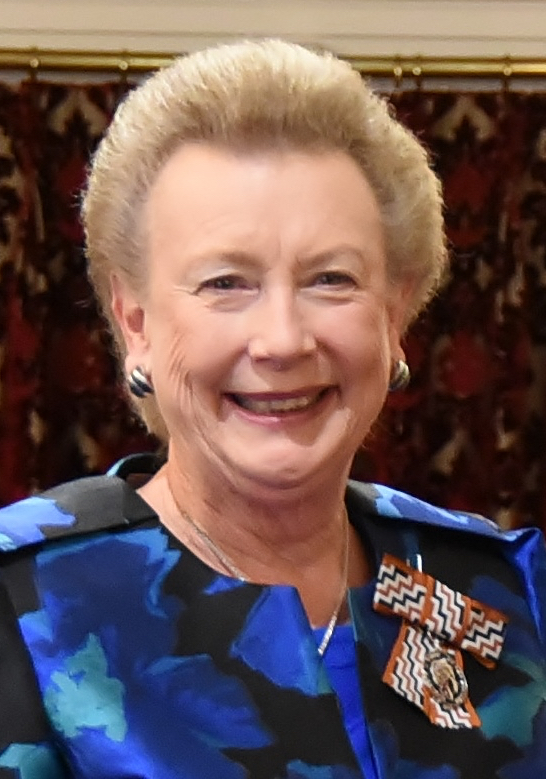
Margaret, Lady Spring, in 2017

Margaret, Lady Spring, was awarded the Queen's Service Medal in the 2017 New Year Honours, for services to governance and health, having been active in health and community charities in Matamata for many years.
