= Marion Frater =

New Zealand jurist

Marion Frater CNZM
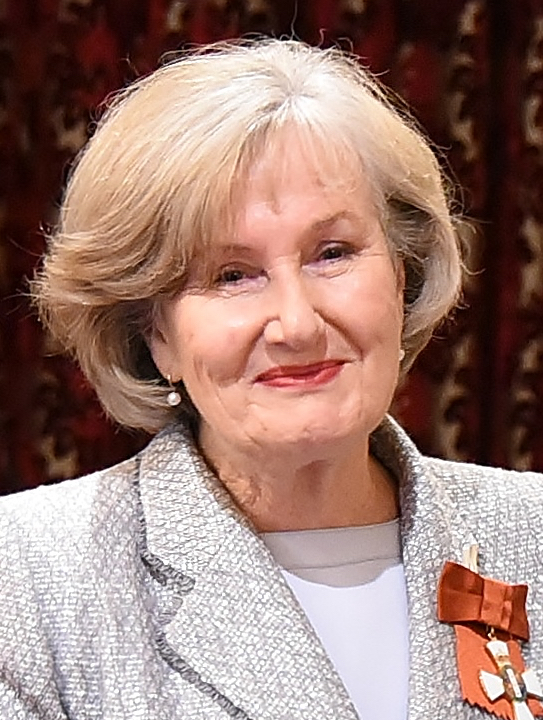
- Awards: Companion of the New Zealand Order of Merit

Marion Anne Frater CNZM is a New Zealand judge. Currently Chair of the Public Protection Order Review Panel where she has served in capacity of Deputy Chair since 2016. In 2017, Frater was appointed a Companion of the New Zealand Order of Merit, for services to the judiciary. Justice Frater was previously Deputy Chairperson of the New Zealand Parole Board, a position she has held from 2007 until 2018. She was a Judge of the High Court from 2003 to 2007. Previously, she was a Judge of the District Court from 1990, where she sat in both the Family Court and the criminal jury trial jurisdictions and held the leadership role of Family Court Administrative Judge.

== Academic career ==
Frater completed a Bachelor of Laws with Honours at Victoria University of Wellington in 1972. Interviewed in 2017, she estimated that there had been twelve women in the class of 120 enrolled law students, but only three women graduated. She practised in Wellington with Buddle Anderson Kent and Co. Frater said that she was not expected to become partner because "They just didn’t make women partners. It was an unspoken thing, and I didn’t push for it". She described the difficulty of taking maternity leave, and feeling pressured to come back afterwards, saying "It wasn’t the expectation that if you had children, you would be able to work". After taking two periods of unpaid maternity leave, and finding herself unable to discuss terms with the partners, she left and began working with a barrister, and was paid for her third period of maternity leave.

Frater was made a district court judge in 1990, and was a Family Court Administrative Judge. From 1994 to 2002 Frater represented the District Court on the New Zealand Law Society Continuing Legal Education Committee. Frater has advised on gender equity and family violence issues, and was a member of the organising committee for the 1993 International Conference of Women Judges. Frater has served on the committee of the New Zealand Association of Women Judges.

Frater was chair of the Arohata Prison Board from 1999 to 2002. She was appointed as a Judge of the High Court in 2003, and sat in Auckland. In 2007 Frater was appointed as Deputy Chair of the New Zealand Parole Board, and returned to Wellington. Frater was appointed Deputy Chairperson of the Public Protection Order Review Panel in 2016.

Frater was a member of the Council of the Wellington District Law Society from 1988 to 1990.

== Honours and awards ==
In the 2017 New Year Honours, Frater was appointed a Companion of the New Zealand Order of Merit, for services to the judiciary. Frater is a Life Member of the Wellington Women Lawyer’s Association.
