= Selwyn Cushing =

New Zealand businessman (1936–2026)

Sir Selwyn Cushing KNZM CMG
- Born: Selwyn John Cushing; 1 September 1936; Hastings, New Zealand
- Died: 10 February 2026 (aged 89); Hastings, New Zealand
- Education: Hastings Boys' High School
- Occupation: Businessman
- Spouse: Kaye Dorothy Anderson (m. 1964; died 1986)
- Children: 2

Sir Selwyn John Cushing KNZM CMG (1 September 1936 – 10 February 2026) was a New Zealand accountant and businessman.

== Background ==
Cushing was born in Hastings on 1 September 1936, the only child of a manager at the Whakatu freezing works. He was educated at Hastings Boys' High School. In 1964, he married Kaye Dorothy Anderson, and the couple went on to have two children. His wife died in 1986.

He represented Hawke's Bay in cricket, and was also an accomplished violinist.

Cushing died at his home in Hastings, on 10 February 2026, at the age of 89.

== Career ==
Cushing qualified as a chartered accountant, and became involved in corporate governance as a director and chair of some of New Zealand's largest and most well-known public companies and state-owned enterprises. Such companies included Brierley Investments, Air New Zealand, Carter Holt Harvey, Mount Cook Group, Electricity Corporation of New Zealand, the New Zealand Symphony Orchestra, and Skellerup. He stepped down from the board of the latter company in 2017.

In 2018, the Cushing family was estimated to be worth $235 million.

== Honours and awards ==
In the 1994 Queen's Birthday Honours, Cushing was appointed a Companion of the Order of St Michael and St George, for services to business management, and in the 1999 New Year Honours he was made a Knight Companion of the New Zealand Order of Merit, for services to business, sport and the arts.
