= Beverley Wakem =

New Zealand public servant

Dame Beverley Wakem DNZM CBE
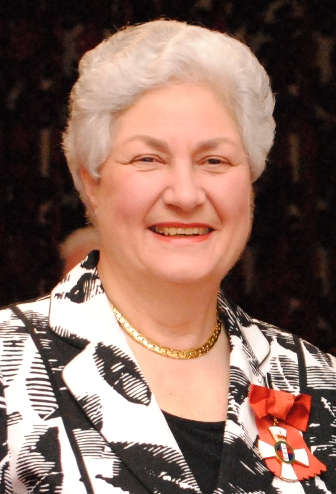
- Wakem in 2012

7th New Zealand Chief Ombudsman
- In office 23 April 2008 – 9 December 2015
- Preceded by: John Belgrave
- Succeeded by: Peter Boshier

Personal details
- Born: 27 January 1944 (age 82) Wellington, New Zealand
- Education: BA (1968); Victoria University of Wellington, MA (1973); University of Kentucky

Dame Beverley Anne Wakem DNZM CBE (born 27 January 1944) is a former Chief Ombudsman of New Zealand.

== Biography ==
Wakem's background is in broadcasting, public relations, and consulting for both the public and private sectors. She was chief executive of Radio New Zealand from 1984 until 1991. In 1991, she was appointed commercial director for Wrightson Limited, soon becoming the company's general manager of human resources and corporate affairs. In 1992 she considered running as a candidate for Mayor of Wellington at that years local-body election. From 1996 to 1997, Wakem was executive chairman of Hill & Knowlton New Zealand, and in September 1997 was appointed to the Higher Salaries Commission.

Wakem was appointed Ombudsman on 1 March 2005 and reappointed for another five-year term on 1 March 2010. She was president of the International Ombudsman Institute from November 2010 to October 2014, being the first woman and the third New Zealand ombudsman to hold the position.

After her second term as Chief Ombudsman, Wakem was elected to Porirua City Council in the 2016 local elections.

== Honours and awards ==
In the 1990 Queen's Birthday Honours, Wakem was appointed a Commander of the Order of the British Empire, for services to broadcasting and to the community. The same year, she was awarded the New Zealand 1990 Commemoration Medal. In the 2012 Queen's Birthday and Diamond Jubilee Honours, she was made a Dame Companion of the New Zealand Order of Merit, for services to the State.

Government offices
Preceded by John Belgrave	New Zealand Chief Ombudsman; 2008–2015	Succeeded by Peter Boshier
