= Ron Young (jurist) =

New Zealand jurist

The Honourable Sir Ron Young KNZM
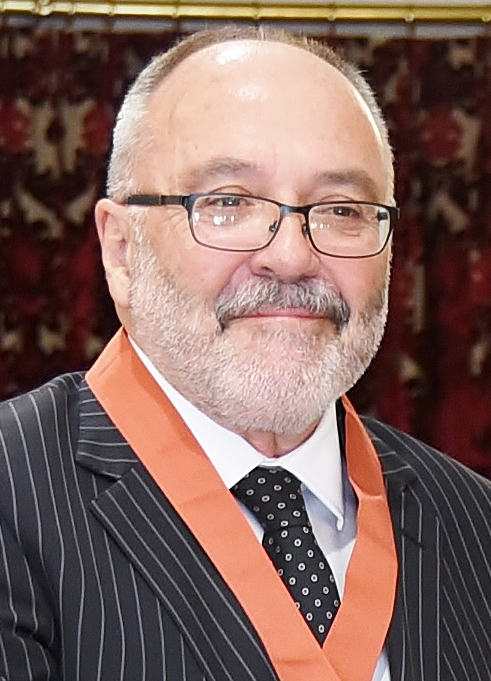
- Young in 2016

Justice of the High Court
- In office 2001–2015

4th Chief District Court judge
- In office 1993–2001
- Preceded by: Silvia Cartwright
- Succeeded by: David Carruthers

Personal details
- Born: Ronald Leslie Young; 1951 or 1952 (age 73–74)
- Occupation: Lawyer

Sir Ronald Leslie Young KNZM (born 1951 or 1952) is a New Zealand jurist. He served as chief District Court judge from 1993 to 2001, and was a High Court judge from 2001 until 2015, when he retired. In the 2016 Queen's Birthday Honours, he was appointed a Knight Companion of the New Zealand Order of Merit, for services to the judiciary.
