= Mark Berry (lawyer) =

New Zealand lawyer

Chair of the Commerce Commission
- In office 2009–2019
- Deputy: Susan Begg
- Preceded by: Paula Rebstock
- Succeeded by: Anna Rawlings

Personal details
- Education: Columbia Law School
- Profession: Lawyer
- Website: https://mblaw.co.nz

Mark Berry is a New Zealand lawyer who was the chair of the Commerce Commission of New Zealand between April 2009 and May 2019.

Berry was a partner in law firm Bell Gully (then called Bell Gully Buddle Weir) from 1988 until he resigned to do post-graduate studies at the Columbia Law School where he gained a JSD. He taught Contract Law, Competition Law and Securities Regulation at University of Otago Faculty of Law.

He was Deputy Chair of the Commerce Commission from 1999 to 2001. He was a consultant with Chapman Tripp until 2003. From 2003, Berry practised as a barrister sole at Barristers.Comm chambers.

Government offices
Preceded by Paula Rebstock	Chair of the Commerce Commission of New Zealand; 2009–2019	Succeeded by Anna Rawlings
