= Graeme Stevens =

New Zealand geoologist, paleontologist and environmentalist (1932–2026)

Dr Graeme Roy Stevens
- Born: 17 July 1932; Lower Hutt, New Zealand
- Died: 9 April 2026 (aged 93); Lower Hutt, New Zealand
- Education: Victoria University of Wellington
- Occupations: paleontologist, geologist
- Spouse: Diane Olliver
- Children: 3, Peter, Robert and Trina
- Scientific career
- Fields: Palentolology

Graeme Roy Stevens (July 17 1932- April 9 2026) was a New Zealand scientist and world-renowned palaeontologist. He was born in the Hutt Valley, was a foundation pupil at Waterloo School and then went on to Hutt Valley High School.

At Victoria University he studied zoology and geology, and won a scholarship to Cambridge University, where he studied New Zealand belemites. His supervisor Dr Arkell died shortly after he arrived. He got a Cambridge Blue for running; he was a keen cross-country and middle-distance runner.

He worked at the New Zealand Geological Survey, part of the DSIR, where he became Chief Paleontologist after the death of his mentor Dr Charles Alexander Fleming. He helped compile the two-volume Geology of New Zealand, and specialised in the fossil fauna of the Mesozoic Era, especially belemnites and ammonimites. He retired in 1992. French colleagues named Stevensites a group of ammonites from the Himilayas after him.

He lectured to many non-scientists, eg university extension and WEA groups, and also took field trips etc for them.

== Personal ==
He married Diane Olliver in 1962, they had met at Scottish Country Dancing. They had three children Peter, Robert and Trina.

== Books ==
- New Zealand Geological Survey tour guide: Quaternary geology, tectonics and geomorphology of Wellington Peninsula (1973)
- A Tramper’s Guide to the Geology of the Tararuas (1973,1974)
- Wellington’s Restless Coast: changes in land and sea at Turakirae Head (1974,1975)
- Rugged Landscape – The Geology of Central New Zealand including Wellington, Wairarapa Manawatu and the Marlborough Sounds (1975)
- The geology of New Zealand (1978, co-author)
- 1840: the land and the people (1978, co-author)
- New Zealand Adrift: the theory of continental drift in a New Zealand setting (1980) on plate tectonics
- Lands in Collision: discovering New Zealand’s past geography (1985)
- The Reed New Zealand Atlas (1987, co-author)
- On shaky ground: a geological guide to the Wellington metropolitian region (1991)
- Prehistoric New Zealand (1988, 1995 (revised))
- Hettangian-Sinemurian (early Jurassic) ammonimites of New Zealand (2004)
