= Office of the Ombudsman (New Zealand) =

Officer of the New Zealand Parliament

- Kaitiaki Mana Tangata (Māori)

Agency overview
- Formed: 1962
- Jurisdiction: New Zealand
- Headquarters: 70 The Terrace Wellington 6011
- Minister responsible: Gerry Brownlee, Speaker of the House of Representatives
- Agency executive: John Allen, Chief Ombudsman
- Website: www.ombudsman.parliament.nz

The Ombudsman is an officer of the New Zealand Parliament who independently looks into complaints. The core jurisdiction of the office covers cases of maladministration. Over the years, it has been progressively expanded to include complaints under the Official Information Act 1982 and Local Government Official Information and Meetings Act 1987, as well as whistleblower complaints under the Protected Disclosures Act 2000. Additionally, the Ombudsman serves as one of New Zealand's national preventive mechanisms under the Optional Protocol to the Convention against Torture.

Ombudsmen are appointed by the Governor-General of New Zealand on recommendation of the New Zealand House of Representatives for a term of five years.

Since 31 March 2025, the Chief Ombudsman is John Allen.

== History ==
The idea of establishing an ombudsman in New Zealand dates back to early 1961 when the Second National Government circulated a paper proposing its creation, based on the Scandinavian model. The public service initially viewed the idea with skepticism. In 1962, Parliament passed the Parliamentary Commissioner (Ombudsman) Act 1962, creating an ombudsmen system based on that of Denmark, with powers to investigate administrative decisions. Initially the Ombudsman served for a term of three years and had jurisdiction only over central government agencies. In 1968 its jurisdiction was extended to include education boards and hospital boards. In 1975 the Act was replaced by the Ombudsmen Act 1975, which allowed for multiple Ombudsmen, each serving a term of five years. In 1982 the jurisdiction of the Ombudsmen was expanded again to cover complaints under the Official Information Act 1982.

== List of Chief Ombudsmen ==
The following is a list of New Zealand's Chief Ombudsmen:

No.	Name	Portrait	Term start	Term end
1	Guy Powles		13 October 1975	5 April 1977
2	George Laking		6 April 1977	15 October 1984
3	Lester Castle		16 October 1984	26 November 1986
4	John Robertson		21 December 1986	14 December 1994
5	Brian Elwood		14 December 1994	30 June 2003
6	John Belgrave		1 July 2003	3 December 2007
7	Beverley Wakem		23 April 2008	9 December 2015
8	Peter Boshier		9 December 2015	28 March 2025
9	John Allen		31 March 2025	present
