= District Court of New Zealand =

Court of first instance of New Zealand

- Te Kōti ā Rohe (Māori)
- Established: 1980 (Magistrates' courts in 1893)
- Jurisdiction: New Zealand
- Composition method: Appointed by the Governor-General on the advice of the Attorney-General
- Authorised by: District Court Act 2016
- Appeals to: High Court of New Zealand, Court of Appeal of New Zealand
- Judge term length: until age 70 (District Court Act 2016, s 28)
- Number of positions: 133
- Website: districtcourts.govt.nz

Chief District Court Judge
- Currently: Heemi Taumaunu
- Since: 25 September 2019

The District Court of New Zealand (Māori: Te Kōti ā Rohe) (formerly the district courts before 2016) is the primary court of first instance of New Zealand. There are 59 District Court locations throughout New Zealand (as of 2017). The court hears civil claims of up to $350,000 and most criminal cases. It is governed by the District Court Act 2016, which replaced the earlier District Courts Act 1947 (formerly titled the Magistrates' Courts Act 1947) as well as the District Court Rules which are periodically revised by the Rules Committee.

The court was established in 1980 to replace magistrates' courts, which had dealt with minor criminal matters and civil claims since 1893. The establishment of the court was the result of the recommendations made in the 1978 report of the Royal Commission on the Courts. It was given an expanded jurisdiction and the Family Court was created as a division of the District Court in 1981. The Youth Court is another specialist division of the District Court, dealing with people under the age of 17 who have been charged with criminal offending.

In 2011, the New Zealand Attorney-General stated that the District Court was "the largest court in Australasia". The larger District Court locations operate on a daily basis, while others may only operate on a weekly or monthly basis, usually being serviced by judges from larger centres.

== Jurisdiction ==
The jurisdiction of the District Court derives from the District Court Act 2016, which provides that the District Court can hear both criminal and civil proceedings.

The District Court's criminal jurisdiction is busier and arguably broader than any other court. Over 95% of all criminal trials, including jury trials on all but the most serious matters are heard in the District Court. Within its jurisdiction are offences ranging from very serious offending such as rape, aggravated robbery, and sexual violation down to minor offences such as disorderly behaviour. The only charges that cannot be heard by the District Court are category 4 offences, such as murder, manslaughter and crimes against the state (e.g. treason). The District Court cannot sentence a person to life imprisonment or to preventive detention; such cases require a transfer to the High Court for sentencing.

The District Court's civil jurisdiction allows the court to hear any matter where the amount in dispute is $350,000 or less. Civil claims where the amount is $30,000 or less are usually heard by the Disputes Tribunal rather than the District Court. Civil claims involve arguments over money and property and can include complex commercial transactions.

The District Court can hear appeals from some tribunals and authorities, including the Disputes Tribunal, Tenancy Tribunal and Accident Compensation Corporation (ACC) external review hearings.

Te Kooti Matariki, the Matariki Court, is a sentencing court for Māori adult offenders within the mainstream court system, under the District Court and operating under the Sentencing Act 2002. It is based in Kaikohe, Northland Region.

== Judges ==
There are 133 District Court judges, including the Chief District Court Judge. Judges are permanently based in the main centres, but travel to other courts on circuit. While each District Court judge can preside over minor criminal matters, they each specialise in particular aspects of the District Court's jurisdiction, either jury trials, family or youth.

=== Chief District Court judges ===
The following is a list of chief District Court judges since 1980.

	Name	Portrait	Term of office	
1	Desmond Sullivan		1980	1985
2	Peter Trapski		1985	1989
3	Silvia Cartwright		1989	1993
4	Ron Young		1993	2001
5	David Carruthers		2001	2005
6	Russell Johnson		2005	2011
7	Jan-Marie Doogue		2011	2019
8	Heemi Taumaunu		2019	Incumbent

== Locations ==
District Court centres conducting jury trials

- Kaikohe
- Whangārei
- Auckland
- Manukau
- Hamilton
- Tauranga
- Rotorua
- Gisborne
- Napier
- New Plymouth
- Whanganui
- Palmerston North
- Wellington
- Nelson
- Blenheim
- Greymouth
- Christchurch
- Timaru
- Dunedin
- Invercargill

District Court centres conducting judge-alone trials only

- Alexandra
- Ashburton
- Chatham Islands
- Dannevirke
- Gore
- Hastings
- Hāwera
- Huntly
- Hutt Valley
- Kaitaia
- Levin
- Masterton
- Morrinsville
- North Shore
- Papakura
- Porirua
- Pukekohe
- Queenstown
- Taihape
- Taumarunui
- Taupō
- Thames
- Tokoroa
- Wairoa
- Waitākere District Court, located at Henderson
- Westport
- Whakatāne

Hearings-only locations

These locations are only open for hearings and trials. Their registry locations are noted in brackets.

- Dargaville (Whangārei)
- Kaikōura (Blenheim)
- Marton (Whanganui)
- Oamaru (Timaru)
- Ōpōtiki (Whakatane)
- Ruatoria (Gisborne)
- Te Awamutu (Hamilton)
- Te Kūiti (Hamilton)
- Waihi (Tauranga)
- Waipukurau (Hastings)
