= Family Court of New Zealand =

Legal structures in New Zealand

- Te Kōti ā-Whānau Aotearoa (Māori)
- Established: 1 October 1981
- Location: Level 3, Justice Centre, 19 Aitken Street, Wellington, New Zealand
- Composition method: Appointed by the Governor-General on behalf of King Charles III on the advice of the Prime Minister (Chief Justice) and Attorney-General (Justices)
- Authorised by: Family Courts Act 1980
- Appeals to: High Court of New Zealand
- Judge term length: Life tenure (Constitution Act 1986, s 23)
- Number of positions: 43
- Website: www.justice.govt.nz/family

Principal Family Court Judge
- Currently: Judge Jacquelyn Moran
- Since: 2018

The Family Court of New Zealand (Māori: Te Kōti ā-Whānau Aotearoa) is a court that exists specifically to assist New Zealanders with family issues. There are 58 Family Courts throughout New Zealand.

Although the Family Court is a division of the District Courts, it retains its own identity.

== Role ==
The Family Court most commonly deals with the welfare of children and relationship property division. It also deals with issues relating to births, deaths, marriage, and mental health.

== Legislation ==
The Family Court deals with applications under the following legislation:

- Adoption Act 1955
- Adoption (Intercountry) Act 1997
- Alcoholism and Drug Addiction Act 1966
- Care of Children Act 2004
- Child Support Act 1991
- Civil Union Act 2004
- Family Violence Act 2018
- Family Proceedings Act 1980
- Family Protection Act 1955
- Intellectual Disability (Compulsory Care and Rehabilitation) Act 2003
- Law Reform (Testamentary Promises) Act 1949
- Marriage Act 1955
- Mental Health (Compulsory) Assessment and Treatment Act 1992
- Oranga Tamariki Act 1989
- Property (Relationships) Act 1976
- Protection of Personal and Property Rights Act 1988
- Wills Act 2007

== See also ==
- District Court of New Zealand
