= Embassy of the United States, Wellington =

Diplomatic mission of the United States of America in New Zealand

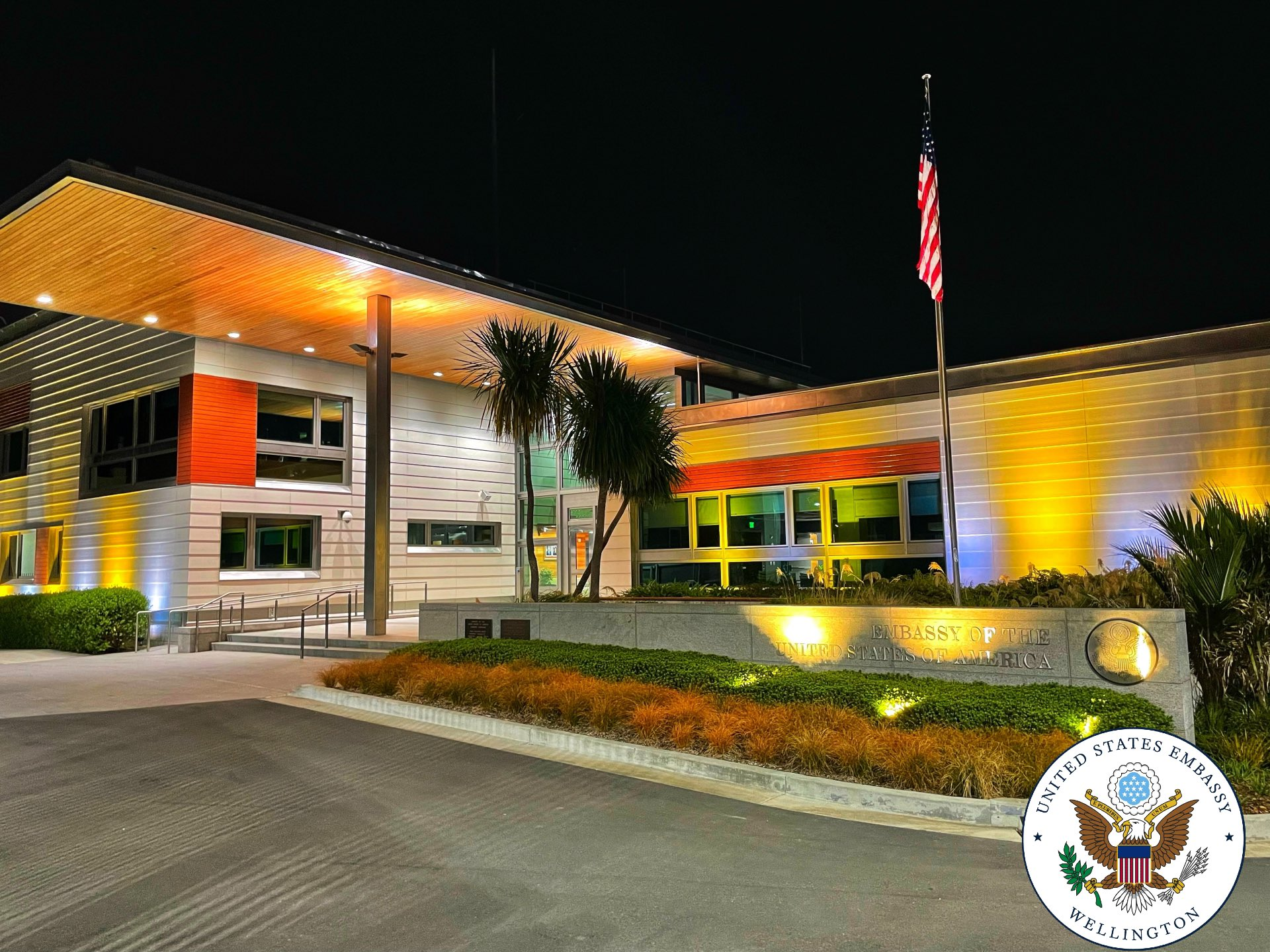
- The embassy in 2022
- Location: Wellington, New Zealand
- Address: 29 Fitzherbert Terrace, Thorndon, Wellington 6011, New Zealand
- Coordinates: 41°16′23″S 174°46′44″E
- Website: https://nz.usembassy.gov

The Embassy of the United States in Wellington is the diplomatic mission of the United States of America in New Zealand. The United States had consular representation in Wellington from 1868 and since 1922, the consul-general relocated from Auckland to the country's capital, Wellington. The United States recognized New Zealand's independent status in 1942 and in the same year, a legation was established in Wellington. In 1948, the transition from legation to embassy occurred. After leasing various offices for decades, the United States had a purpose-built embassy established in Thorndon in 1977; this remains the current embassy building.

== History ==
The first consular office was established in Wellington in 1868, some three years after the country's capital had shifted from Auckland to Wellington. But it was only in 1922 that the American consul-general moved from Auckland to Wellington.

The United States formally recognized New Zealand's independent state status on February 16, 1942. The first diplomatic mission, a legation, was established in Wellington on April 1, 1942, with Patrick J. Hurley presenting his credentials as Envoy Extraordinary and Minister Plenipotentiary to New Zealand on April 24 of the same year. The legation office was in the DIC Building on Lambton Quay.

The transition from legation to embassy occurred after World War II. On December 1, 1948, Sir Carl Berendsen became the first New Zealand Ambassador Extraordinary and Plenipotentiary to the United States, and shortly thereafter, on December 22, 1948, Robert M. Scotten reciprocally presented his credentials as the first U.S. Ambassador Extraordinary and Plenipotentiary to New Zealand.

Some time in 1952 or 1953, the embassy moved from the DIC Building to the Government Life Building in Customhouse Quay. In early April 1971, the embassy moved to the IBM Centre—today known as Radio New Zealand House—on The Terrace. By 1977, the embassy was occupying three floors of the IBM Centre, but had a further office in Wakefield House, just 350 m (1,150 ft) further along on the same street.

The current embassy building is located at 29 Fitzherbert Terrace in the central Wellington suburb of Thorndon. That building was dedicated on July 3, 1977, and it became fully operational two weeks later on July 18. The building was purpose-built by and for the Americans. Work on the new building began in October 1974 and it cost $2 million to complete the project. Apart from the consular offices, there is provision for commercial and agricultural arms, defense, and the United States Information Service (USIS).

In 1998, following the bombing of two embassies in Africa, security at the building was upgraded. The embassy also contacted the New Zealand government and Wellington police had been contacted about security concerns. An embassy official declined to say what the specific measures were, but were being extra-cautious and stressing that they did not view New Zealand as having high a security threat level. In 1999 bollards were erected outside the perimeter fence of the embassy. This followed the Wellington City Council banning public vehicle parking in front of the embassy a year earlier. Neighbours were not consulted prior to the bollard erection leading to complaints from residents, but the embassy had approached the council before it installed the bollards and had been given approval. In September 2002 the embassy was the scene of an anthrax scare on the anniversary of the September 11 attacks in New York City. After the discovery of a suspicious package leaking a white powder, fire crews wearing protective biohazard suits were called and remained for nearly two hours until the scene was cleared.

In 2013, following a seismic-risk assessment, the complex had a major upgrade which included a NZ$60 million spend to install blast walls, replacing existing concrete and steel fences. In November 2014 a package was sent to the embassy containing a suspicious vial of liquid. It was not opened after being picked up in mail screening and also contained documents, one referring to Ebola. An embassy worker was decontaminated and its mail sorting room was isolated. The fire service hazardous material and command truck and police bomb disposal unit was at the scene, with fire-fighters seen wearing chemical suits outside the embassy. The vial was sent extracted and sent for testing.

Chancery buildings

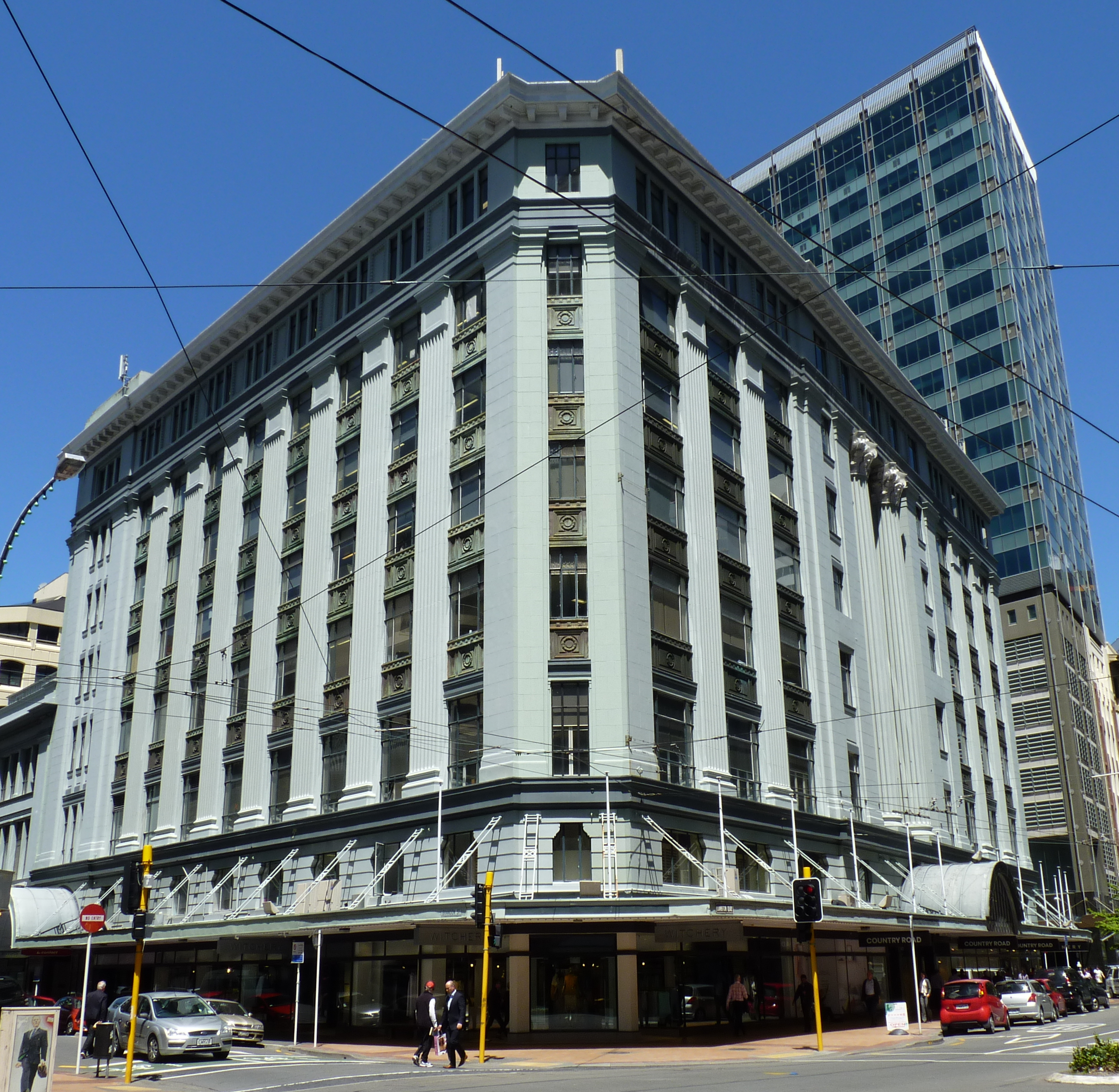
The first legation in Wellington opened in the DIC Building in 1942

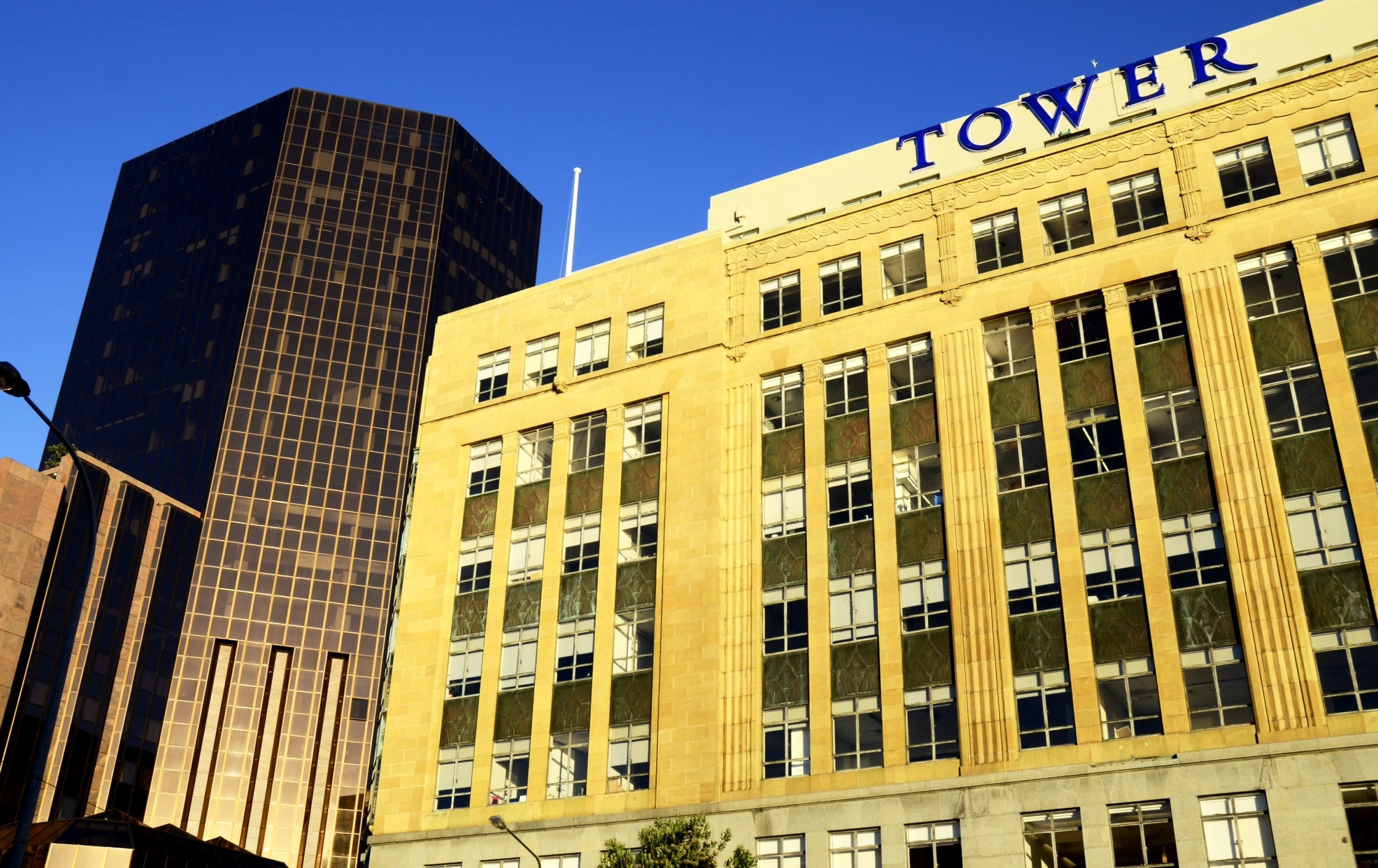
The embassy occupied the Government Life Building (right) from 1952 or 1953 to 1971

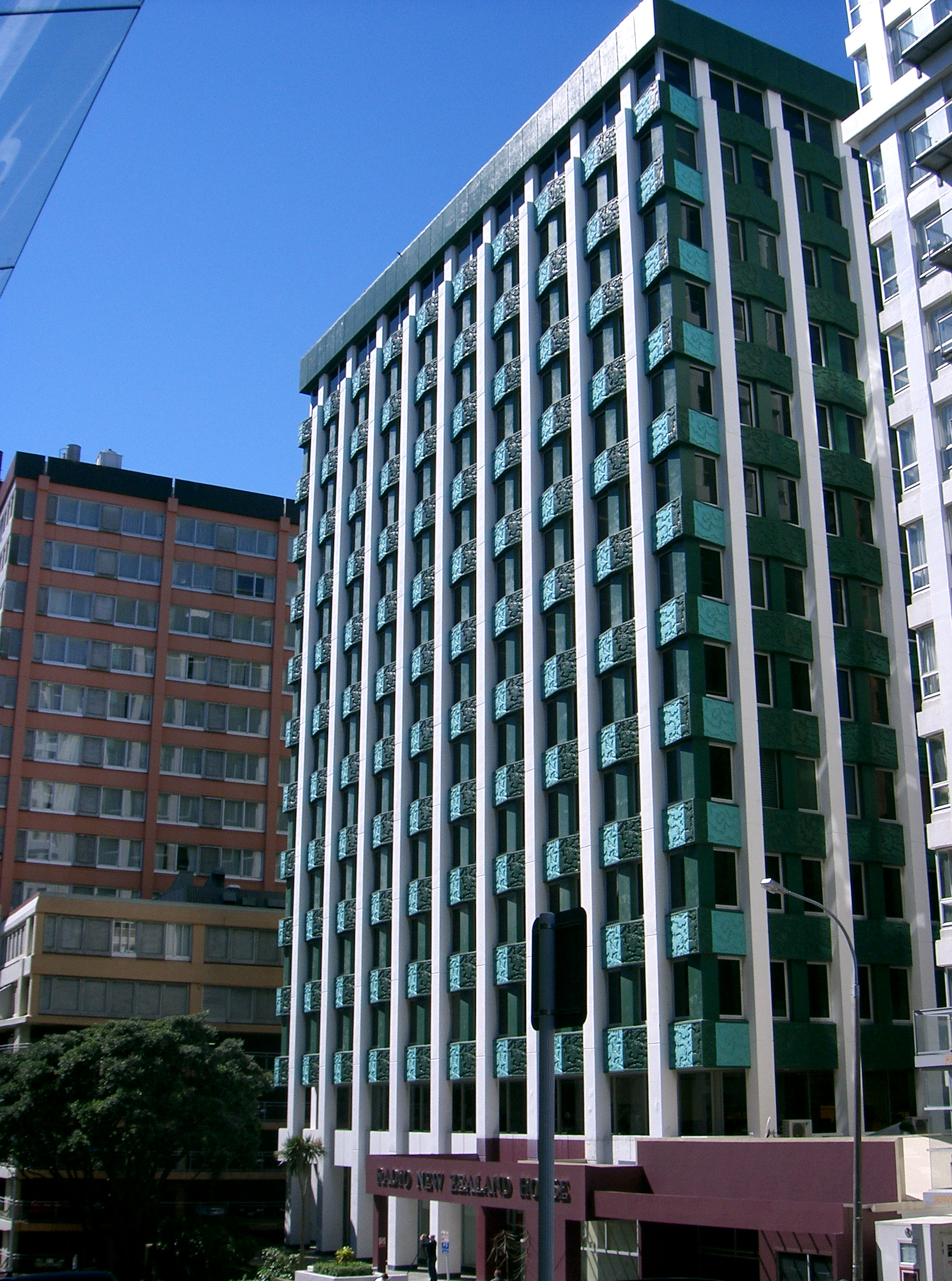
The embassy occupied the IBM Centre (now Radio New Zealand House) from 1971 to 1977

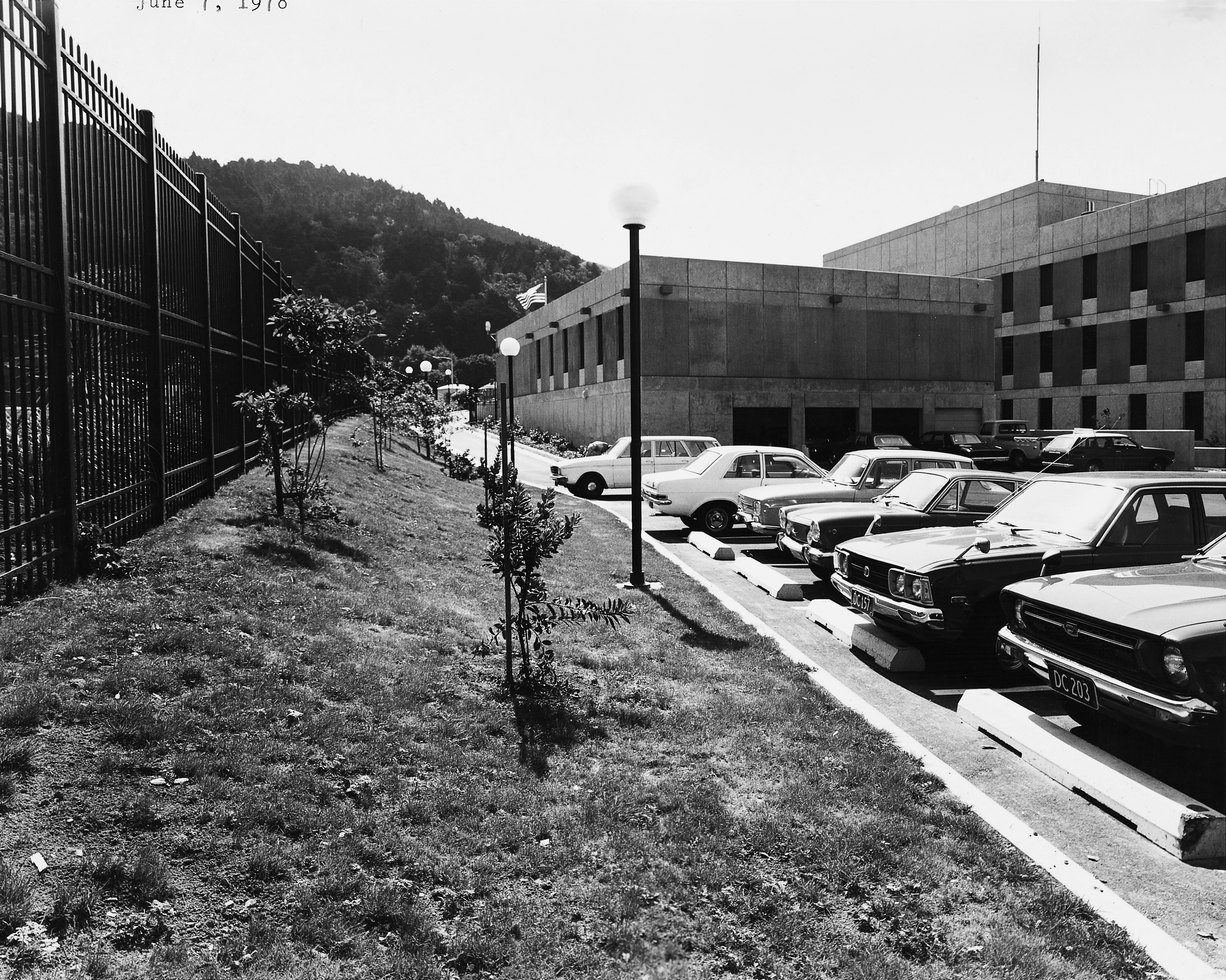
The embassy has been located in this Thorndon building since 1977

== See also ==
- Embassy of New Zealand, Washington, D.C.
- List of ambassadors of the United States to New Zealand
- New Zealand–United States relations
