= Fashion for Fighters Foundation =

Fashion Fighters
- Founded: 2015
- Purpose: "Dedicated to expanding fashion to support wounded, ill, and injured service members through fashion shows and events."
- Location: United States, Kenya
- Region served: United States, Kenya
- Method: Fundraising
- Website: fashionforfighters.org

The Fashion for Fighters Foundation supports and raises funds for those wounded, ill, and injured while serving in the US Navy and Coast Guard. Through fashion shows and events, Fashion for Fighters provides funds to Navy Safe Harbor Foundation (NSHF) for resources that are not provided by the government.

== History ==
The Fashion for Fighters Foundation was founded May 2015 by President Chris Decker. This foundation has three major goals: support injured and retired military personnel, provide resources not funded by the government or through community avenues, and increase awareness for the needs of military members through fashion venues.

The Fashion for Fighters Foundation hosts an annual Gala every spring. The first Gala was held in May 2015 in Washington, D.C., the second in April 2016 also in Washington, D.C., and the third in June 2017 at the Embassy of New Zealand, Washington, D.C. The fourth Gala was held in May 2018 at Springfield Golf & Country Club. Gala proceeds go to disabled Veterans in need and to fundraise for the Navy Safe Harbor Foundation.

In 2019, Decker founded Fashion for Fighters Kenya, holding fashion shows and promoting veterans' businesses, such as selling paintings and accessories.

The fifth Gala was held in April 2019 at St. Francis Hall in Washington, D.C. After postponements due to the COVID-19 pandemic, the sixth Gala was held in May 2023 at the Army and Navy Club in Washington, D.C.
