= Embassy of New Zealand, Washington, D.C. =

Chief diplomatic mission of New Zealand in the United States

Embassy of New Zealand in Washington, D.C. Te Kāinga o te Māngai o Aotearoa i Washington D.C.
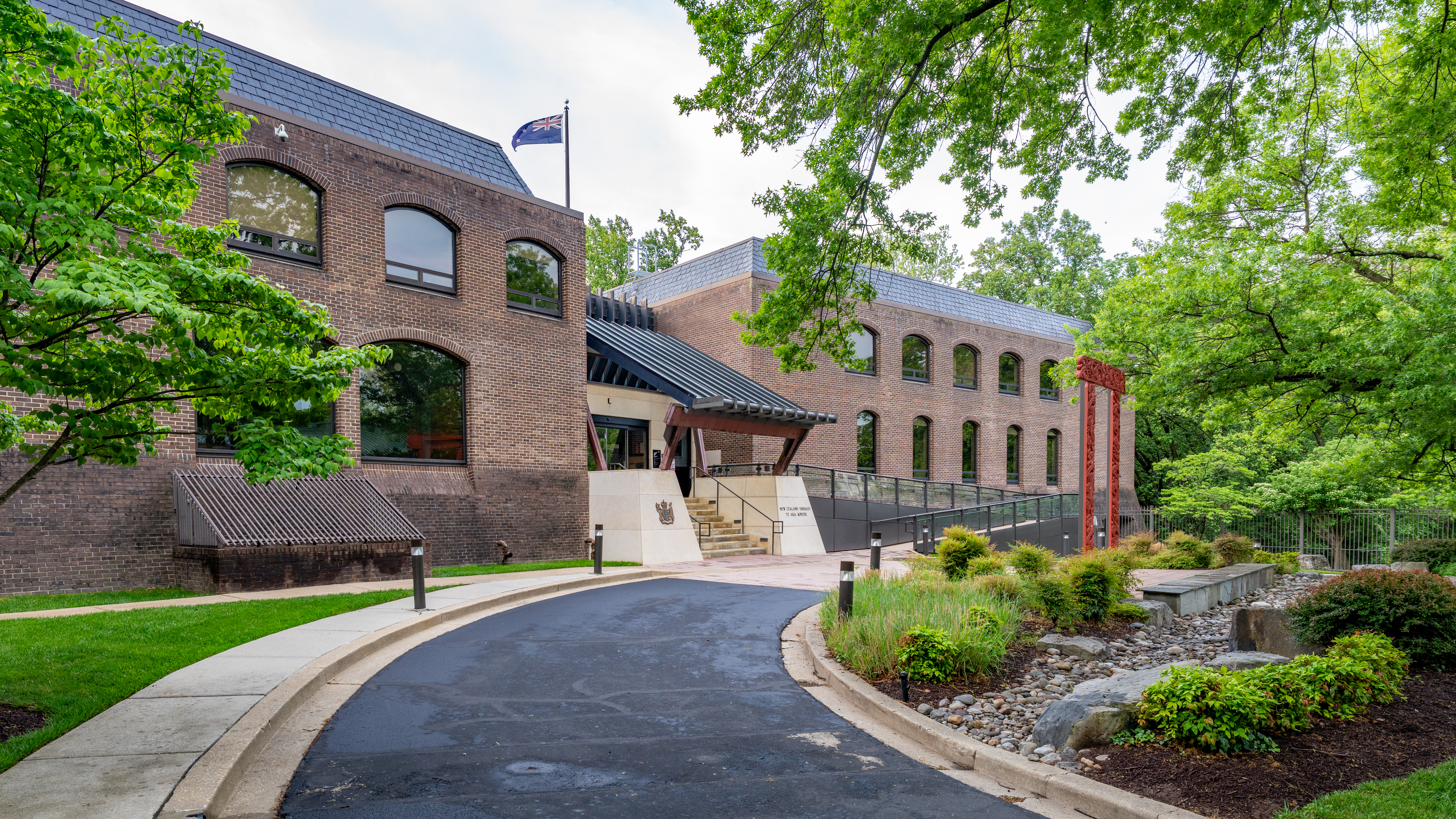
- Location: Washington, D.C.
- Address: 37 Observatory Circle, N.W.
- Coordinates: 38°55′8.4″N 77°3′50.76″W
- Ambassador: Bede Corry

The Embassy of New Zealand in Washington, D.C., United States (in Māori: Te Kāinga o te Māngai o Aotearoa i Washington D.C.) is located at 37 Observatory Circle, Northwest, Washington, D.C. in the Embassy Row neighborhood.

The embassy also operates consulates general in Los Angeles, New York City, and Honolulu and honorary consulates in Atlanta, Boston, Chicago, Houston, Sacramento, Salt Lake City, San Diego, San Francisco, Seattle, and Tamuning, which provide assistance to New Zealand citizens and issue travel visas to foreign nationals who intend to visit New Zealand.

New Zealand opened a legation in Washington, D.C., in October 1941 which was upgraded to an embassy in 1948.

Bede Corry was appointed New Zealand Ambassador to the United States on 6 July 2022.

== Embassy staff ==
The embassy is staffed by officers from the New Zealand Ministry of Foreign Affairs and Trade (MFAT), New Zealand Trade and Enterprise (NZTE), New Zealand Defence Force, New Zealand Police, New Zealand Customs Service, Ministry of Science, Research and Technology, and the Ministry of Education.

== Chancery ==
The chancery was designed by the New Zealand architect Sir Miles Warren. In 1954, the present embassy site was purchased to accommodate all staff in one building, but the chancery was not constructed until 1975. The building won for its designer the 1981 New Zealand Institute of Architects National Award. The brickwork of the chancery won the Annual Brick Award for the Eastern States of the U.S.

== See also ==
- New Zealand–United States relations
- Embassy of the United States in Wellington
- List of Ambassadors from New Zealand to the United States
- List of diplomatic missions of New Zealand
- United States – New Zealand Council
