= United States – New Zealand Council =

The United States – New Zealand Council (US–NZ Council) is an independent non-profit, non-partisan organisation dedicated to promoting a strong bilateral relationship between the United States and New Zealand. It is the premier private organisation in the United States engaged in encouraging the expansion of trade, investment and commercial ties between the two countries and in the Asia-Pacific region and is a well-recognised source of information and support for American companies seeking business opportunities there.

== History ==
The US-NZ Council was founded by Anne Martindell, a former United States Ambassador to New Zealand in 1986. The Council was designed to promote a better understanding of New Zealand in the United States, and to foster communication, friendship and co-operation between the two countries.

This came at a time when the US–NZ relationship was most strained following the New Zealand government's decision to bar all nuclear powered and/or armed vessels from its waters. Since this time the Council has continued to work on improving relations between the United States and New Zealand, and has achieved much success. The relationship is currently the best it has been for several decades.

The United States – New Zealand Council is a private, not government, organisation and is located in the historic DACOR Bacon House.

== Partnership Forum ==
The Partnership Forum is an event organised by the US-NZ Council. It brings government officials and business leaders together to discuss the relationship in an informal environment. These Partnership Forums are highly praised, and offer a vital opportunity to focus on the bilateral relationship between the United States and New Zealand.

The 2009 forum, held in Washington, D.C., was co-chaired for the United States by former Congressman Cal Dooley and Ambassador Susan Schwab and for New Zealand by Jim Bolger and Mike Moore. The breadth, rank, and prominence of the delegations, unprecedented in the history of US-NZ relations, included top current and past administration officials, Members of Congress, NZ Ministers, MPs, former Prime Ministers, and chairs and chief executives of New Zealand's major companies.

== Other events ==
The US-NZ Council also hosts smaller events designed to provide networking opportunities for their members. Most recently they co-hosted with the New Zealand Embassy a dinner in honour of Prime Minister John Key, while he was in Washington DC for the Nuclear Security Summit.

The US-NZ Council was addressed by Prime Minister John Key in Washington in April 2010.
