= List of high commissioners of New Zealand to Kiribati =

The high commissioner of New Zealand to Kiribati is New Zealand's foremost diplomatic representative in the Republic of Kiribati, and in charge of New Zealand's diplomatic mission in Kiribati.

The high commission is located in South Tarawa, Kiribati's capital city. New Zealand has maintained a resident high commissioner in Kiribati since 1989. The high commissioner to Kiribati is concurrently accredited to the Marshall Islands, the Federated States of Micronesia, and Palau.

As fellow members of the Commonwealth of Nations, diplomatic relations between New Zealand and Kiribati are at governmental level, rather than between heads of state. Thus, the countries exchange high commissioners, rather than ambassadors.

== List of heads of mission ==
=== High commissioners to Kiribati ===
==== Non-resident high commissioners to Kiribati, resident in Fiji ====
- Michael Powles (1980–1982)
- Lindsay Watt (1982–1985)
- Rod Gates (1985–1988)
- Brian Absolum (1988–1989)

==== Resident high commissioners to Kiribati ====
- Brett Lineham (1989–1991)
- Mel Taylor (1991–1993)
- Brian Marshall (1993–1996)
- John Mills (1996–1999)
- Neil Robertson (1996–2002)
- John Goodman (2002–2006)
- Craig Rickit (2006–2008)
- Robert Kaiwai (2008–2011)
- Mike Walsh (2011–2013)
- Don Higgins (2014–2016)
- Michael Upton (2016–2019)
- Paul Wallis (2020–2022)
- Andre van der Walt (2022–2025)
- Pati Gagau (2025–present)
