= Peter Adams =

Pete or Peter Adams may refer to:

== Artists and performers ==
- Peter Adams (1917–1987), American actor, occasional regular on 1957's Zorro
- Peter Adams (actor) (1938–1999), New Zealand-born actor on Australian television
- Peter Seitz Adams (born 1950), American artist
- Peter Adams, Australian guitarist in 1978 Xero (band)
- Peter Bradley Adams, American folk-pop singer-songwriter since 2001

== Historians ==
- Peter Chardon Brooks Adams, 1848–1927), American historian and political scientist, a/k/a Brooks Adams
- Peter Caddick Adams (born 1960), British military historian, a/k/a Peter Caddick-Adams

== Public officials ==
- Peter Adams, Chief Magistrate of Anguilla from July 1967 to February 1968 (List of colonial governors and administrators of Anguilla)
- Peter Adams (politician) (1936–2018), Canadian House of Commons Liberal member
- Peter Adams (diplomat) (born 1944), New Zealand ambassador to China from 1998 to 2001

== Sportsmen ==
- Pete Adams (1951–2019), American football guard
- Peter Adams (Australian footballer) (born 1964), player with Collingwood in Victorian Football League

== See also ==
- Peter McAdams (1834–1926), Irish-American Union soldier in Civil War
- Peter Adam (disambiguation)
