= Giovanni Cataldo =

Giovanni Cataldo QSM (18 November 1927 – 8 January 1989), commonly known as John Cataldo, was a New Zealand fisherman, and search and rescue organiser. He was born in Wellington, New Zealand, on 18 November 1927.

In the 1986 New Year Honours, Cataldo was awarded the Queen's Service Medal for public services.
