= 2026 in Tokelau =

Events in the year 2026 in Tokelau.

== Incumbents ==
- Administrator: Don Higgins (until June); Andre van der Walt (since June)
- Head of Government: Esera Fofō Tuisano (until 9 March); Alapati Tavite (since 9 March)

== Events ==
- 23 January – The New Zealand Government confirms that it has cancelled plans to build an airport in Tokelau, citing high costs and the adverse environmental impact.
- 5 February – The 2026 Tokelauan general election is held. Results are released on 7 February.
- 11 February – Governor-General of New Zealand Cindy Kiro and HMNZS Canterbury visit Tokelau to meet with local leaders.
- Circa February - Tokelau is excluded from the Vessel Day Scheme of the Parties to the Nauru Agreement, resulting in the loss of two thirds of the island territory's revenue.
- 9 March – Alapati Tavite is sworn in as Ulu o Tokelau for the 2026–2027 term, his second time in the role.
- June – Andre van der Walt is appointed as Administrator of Tokelau by New Zealand Foreign Minister Winston Peters. His appointment was announced in July.
- 28 August – A historic meeting of the leaders of the four constituent members of the Realm of New Zealand to discuss constitutional arrangements is held in Auckland. This meeting is attended by Ulu-o-Tokelau Alapati Tavite, New Zealand Prime Minister Christopher Luxon, Niue Prime Minister Dalton Tagelagi, and Cook Islands Prime Minister Mark Brown.

== Deaths ==
- 29 August – Neil Walter, 83, administrator of Tokelau (1988–1990, 2003–2006)

== See also ==
- History of Tokelau
