= List of high commissioners of New Zealand to Vanuatu =

The high commissioner of New Zealand to Vanuatu is New Zealand's foremost diplomatic representative in the Republic of Vanuatu, and in charge of New Zealand's diplomatic mission in Vanuatu.

The high commission is located in Port Vila, Vanuatu's capital city. New Zealand has maintained a resident high commissioner in Vanuatu since 1987.

As fellow members of the Commonwealth of Nations, diplomatic relations between New Zealand and Vanuatu are at governmental level, rather than between heads of state. Thus, the countries exchange high commissioners, rather than ambassadors.

== List of heads of mission ==
=== High commissioners to Vanuatu ===
==== Non-resident high commissioners, resident in the Solomon Islands ====
- Mary Chamberlin (1980–1983)
- Rodney Denham (1983–1986)
- Alison Pearce (1986–1987)

==== Resident high commissioners ====
- Tony Browne (1987–1990)
- Caroline Forsyth (1990–1993)
- Brian Smythe (1993–1996)
- Caroline McDonald (1996–1999)
- Rob Taylor (1999–2001)
- Brian Smythe (2001–2005)
- Paul Willis (2005–2007)
- Jeff Langley (2007–2010)
- Bill Dobbie (2011–2014)
- Georgina Roberts (2014–2018)
- Jonathan Schwass (2018–2021)
- Nicola (Nicci) Simmonds (2022–2025)
- Peter Kemp (2026–)
