= Michael Green (diplomat) =

New Zealand diplomat

Michael Green was a New Zealand diplomat, who in 2007 was expelled as New Zealand High Commissioner to Fiji by the country's interim government as part of the 2006 Fijian coup d'état.

Green joined the Ministry of Foreign Affairs in 1970, after graduating from the University of Canterbury. He was first posted to Bangkok as second secretary in 1972, before returning to Wellington three years later. In 1978, Green was posted as first secretary to New Zealand's mission to the United Nations in New York. In 1980, Green was posted to New Zealand's Embassy in Beijing.

In 1988, Green was appointed director of the External Assessments Bureau, a section of the Department of Prime Minister and Cabinet, where he spent six years. In 1997, Green succeeded Tim Groser as New Zealand's Ambassador to Indonesia.

Following his return from Jakarta, Green was appointed Deputy Secretary at the New Zealand Ministry of Foreign Affairs and Trade, responsible for New Zealand's security policy and responsibilities for the Americas, North Asia, and South and South-East Asia.

Green was appointed as New Zealand's High Commissioner to Fiji in December 2004.

In June 2007, Green was expelled from Fiji by the country's post-coup interim government, with Prime Minister Frank Bainimarama accusing him of interfering in the country's domestic affairs. In addition, New Zealand police officers were refused Fijian visas to escort Green back to New Zealand, and a Fairfax Media journalist, Michael Field, was detained then deported by Fijian immigration authorities when he arrived to cover the story.

Green died of cancer in 2012.

Diplomatic posts
Preceded by Tim Groser	New Zealand Ambassador to Indonesia; 1997–2001	Succeeded by Chris Elder
Preceded by Adrian Simcock	New Zealand High Commissioner to Fiji; 2004–2007	Succeeded by Caroline McDonald
