= Rangitaamo Takarangi =

Rangitaamo Tiahuia Takarangi QSM (née Taiuru; 24 July 1901 – 5 June 1992) was a notable New Zealand Māori welfare officer and community leader. Of Māori descent, she identified with the Ngāti Hauiti and Ngāti Hine (Waikato) iwi. She was born in Waimoho, near Rangiriri, New Zealand, in 1901.

In the 1986 New Year Honours, Takarangi was awarded the Queen's Service Medal for community service.
