= Bernice Shackleton =

New Zealand journalist

Bernice Shackleton QSM
- Born: 14 November 1901; Waimate, New Zealand
- Died: 3 December 1998 (aged 97); Waimate, New Zealand
- Occupations: Journalist and writer

Bernice Elizabeth Shackleton QSM (14 November 1901 – 3 December 1998) was a New Zealand journalist and writer.

== Biography ==
Shackleton was born in Waimate, New Zealand, in 1901. She was educated at Waimate District High School, Columba College in Dunedin, and Canterbury University College in Christchurch. She graduated with a Diploma of Journalism in 1928 and her first job was as a reporter on the daily newspaper the Christchurch Star. Shackleton reported on court news, however she resigned her position after a judge ordered her to leave the courtroom due to the "unsavoury" nature of the case under discussion. Instead, she travelled overseas and wrote travel articles until returning to the Christchurch Star in 1930 as assistant to the editor. She held this position for five years, and was responsible for the leader page, editorials, a column and a feature titled "A Woman's Point of View". At the time, this was the highest position a woman had reached on a major New Zealand daily paper.

In the 1930s, Shackleton was the founding president of the Christchurch Business and Professional Women's Round Table Club.

In 1936, Shackleton became a freelance parliamentary reporter, and reported on parliament from the segregated public gallery. Her column was syndicated in the four main centres of the country (Auckland, Wellington, Christchurch and Dunedin).

In 1939, Shackleton returned to Waimate to care for her elderly parents, and during World War II she was secretary of the Waimate Women's War Service Auxiliary, the Lady Galway Guild and the local commander of the Women's Transport Corps. She was also a founding member of the Waimate Rewi Alley Aid Committee, which was formed to fundraise and provide support for Alley's work in China. After the war she became interested in international aid and began to work for the non-profit organisation Corso. In 1949 she became publicity officer for their national office.

In 1965, plans to close the local hospital in Waimate were raised, and Shackleton stood for, and was elected to, the South Canterbury Hospital Board. The Waimate Hospital Committee asked her to write a history of the hospital for its centennial, thus in 1984, at the age of 83, she published a book on the history of Waimate Hospital from 1874 to 1975, The Fifth Schedule. It is considered a significant work on the place of small hospitals in the New Zealand health system.

Shackleton died in Waimate on 3 December 1998.

== Awards ==
In the 1986 New Year Honours, Shackleton was awarded the Queens Service Medal for public services.

== Publications ==
Shackleton wrote a series of five articles on New Zealand's railway stations and journeys by rail around the country which were published in the New Zealand Railways Magazine between November 1937 and September 1938. In addition, she produced the following non-fiction works:

- The ever open door : the story of Knox Presbyterian Church, Waimate prepared for the 75th anniversary 1874-1949. Knox Presbyterian Church, 1949
- The ever open door : the story of Knox Presbyterian Church, Waimate : a century of worship 1874-1974. Waimate Publishing Company, 1974
- The Fifth Schedule 1874 - 1975 : The Story of Waimate's Open Community Hospital. Waimate Museum, 1984.
