= Wellington Presbyterian Children's Home =

The Wellington Presbyterian Children's Home (for boys and girls) was founded in 1909 by James Gibb, minister of St John's Presbyterian Church, Willis Street, Wellington. The first house was located in Brooklyn and the Matron was Mrs T. P. Mills.

The Home was administered by the Wellington Presbyterian Orphanage and Social Service Association. In 1910 the Orphanage accommodated 20 children. In 1911 the Orphanage relocated to Waterloo Avenue, Newtown, housing 28 children. In 1913 a new orphanage was built in "The Glen" Berhampore, housing 36 children. The girls from the Orphanage transferred to a purchased property in Island Bay in 1919: the Island Bay Girls' Home. The Berhampore property consisted of two buildings at this time: Junior and Senior Boys' Homes.

In 1956 both the Girls' Home and Boys' Homes were located in Morton Street, Berhampore. In 1962 the Girl's Home re-opened as "Arisaig," a hostel for working girls. Later "Arisaig" became the Children's Home and the hostel was used by the Department of Māori Affairs to place Māori girls.

== 'The beasts of Berhampore' ==
On 12 July 2023, Emily Simpson of the Spinoff published her investigation of historical allegations of abuse at the home, as part of a series called 'The Quarter Million', exploring the testimony given by survivors through the Royal Commission of Inquiry into Abuse in Care. Peter, Rose and Keith Morgan arrived at the home in 1959, and each was subjected to violence and humiliation: 'baths taken in cold, shared, dirty water; lumpy, repulsive food; trainee dental nurses who practised on the children. And then there was what would now be called a culture of bullying — at its most extreme.' Rose was subject to sexual abuse by both staff and fellow girls.

Other survivors of the Berhampore home to come forward to the Inquiry include Andrew Brown.

=== Wallace “Wally” Robert Armstead Lake, O. B. E. ===
Wallace Robert Armstead Lake, known as 'Wally' was born in 1920, served in WW2 in the Pacific and became director of the home in 1959. He received an Order of the British Empire on the 1986 New Year Honours (New Zealand) 'for services to social welfare and the community'. He died in 2004, leaving behind an oral history recording in which he listed 'his involvement with a vast range of causes, from benefits for deserted and battered wives to hostels for Māori girls moving to the city, opportunity shops, Marriage Guidance, the Old People's Welfare Council and the Crippled Children's Society.' He also stated that he was very much against corporal punishment of children.

However, just before his death, the police were about to charge him with several offences against children at the Berhampore home. In 2006, a Television New Zealand documentary called 'The Monster of Berhampore' was broadcast. This led to the social care organisation Presbyterian Support commissioning Dr. George Barton QC to investigate 16 former residents’ complaints. These allegations involved Lake abusing both boys and girls, aged 5 to 17, sometimes violently, mostly sexually, and five of the allegations included rape'.

Dr Barton concluded that the abuse, which included beatings with a dog collar, “probably did happen but was not consequential in context with the standards of discipline acceptable at the time.” 'Presbyterian Support eventually settled with that group of survivors for an undisclosed amount in 2007, more than 20 years after they (along with the police) had brushed aside the first official complaint against Lake' in 1985. Despite this, Lake still received an O.B.E. in 1986 and in 2004, could not be charged posthumously with the later allegations.

=== 'Mr. Brown' ===
A man called 'Mr. Brown' was also cited by the Morgan siblings as a perpetrator of abuse at the Berhampore home, where they remembered he lived with his wife and daughter. However, Presbyterian Support confirm his name is not on record as a staff member.
