= List of high commissioners of New Zealand to Fiji =

The high commissioner of New Zealand to Fiji is New Zealand's foremost diplomatic representative in the Republic of the Fiji Islands, and in charge of New Zealand's diplomatic mission in Fiji.

The high commission is located in Suva, Fiji's capital city. New Zealand first maintained a resident Head of Mission in Fiji since 1970.

As fellow members of the Commonwealth of Nations, the countries exchange high commissioners, rather than ambassadors. This was not the case between 1987 and 1997; after the Coups of 1987, Fiji was expelled from the Commonwealth, but rejoined after the promulgation of a new constitution in 1997. Hence, from 1987 until 1997, New Zealand was represented in Fiji by an ambassador.

== List of heads of mission ==
=== High commissioners to Fiji ===
- Sir John Grace (1970–1973)
- Graham Ansell (1973–1977)
- David McDowell (1977–1980)
- Michael Powles (1980–1982)
- Lindsay Johnstone Watt (1982–1985)
- Rod Gates (1985–1987)

=== Ambassadors to Fiji ===
- Rod Gates (1987–1988)
- Brian Absolum (1988–1991)
- Don MacKay (1991–1995)
- Suzanne Blumhardt (1995–1997)

=== High commissioners to Fiji ===
- Suzanne Blumhardt (1997–1998)
- Tia Barrett (1998–2001)
- Adrian Simcock (2001–2004)
- Michael Green (2004–2007) [Expelled]
- Caroline McDonald (2007–2008) [Expelled]
- Phillip Taula (current)
