= Jelal Kalyanji Natali =

Indian-New Zealand activist

Jelal Kalyanji Natali QSM (17 August 1899 – 28 March 1993) was an Indian-New Zealand shopkeeper, Indian community leader and anti-racism activist.

Born in Surat, Gujarat, Natali arrived in Auckland in 1920 via Natal, South Africa, and established himself as shopkeeper, first in Waimiha in the King Country and then in Taumarunui in the central North Island. After investing in Taumarunui properties and businesses he moved to Browns Bay in Auckland, where his descendants still live.

As early as 1937 Natali was actively engaged in campaigning against racist laws. In the 1986 New Year Honours, he was awarded the Queen's Service Medal for community service.
