= Chris Elder =

Chris or Christopher Elder may refer to:

- Chris Elder (rugby union), English rugby player
- Christopher Elder, diplomat from New Zealand

== See also ==
- Christopher Alder, British paratrooper
- Christian Elder, NASCAR driver
