= Carl Worker =

New Zealand diplomat

Ambassador of New Zealand to Argentina
- In office 13 December 2001 – 2005
- Preceded by: Caroline Forsyth
- Succeeded by: Lucy Duncan

Ambassador of New Zealand to China
- In office 12 June 2009 – 2015
- Preceded by: Tony Browne (diplomat)
- Succeeded by: John McKinnon (diplomat)

Charge d'Affaires of New Zealand to United States
- In office June 2015 – December 2015
- Preceded by: Mike Moore (New Zealand politician)
- Succeeded by: Tim Groser

Personal details
- Born: Carl Robinson Worker; 1955 Palmerston North, New Zealand
- Parents: Neil Adrian Worker. (father); Kathleen Florence McKegg. (mother)
- Education: Master of Arts (Hons) in History and Economics from Oxford University, 1977. Certificate of Proficiency in Economics from Auckland University, 1978.

Carl Robinson Worker (born 1955) is a retired New Zealand career diplomat.

Worker served as New Zealand Ambassador to Argentina and Uruguay from 2019–21, New Zealand Consul-General in Hong Kong and Macao from 2017–19, New Zealand Ambassador for Counter Terrorism from 2016–17, New Zealand Chargé d'Affaires in Washington DC from Jun–Dec 2015, New Zealand Ambassador to China and Mongolia from 2009–15, New Zealand Ambassador to Argentina, Uruguay and Paraguay from 2001–06 and New Zealand Consul-General in Hong Kong and Macao from 1994–98. Earlier overseas assignments included the roles of Deputy Head of Mission in Beijing and Suva, Fiji.

Worker was Director of the Americas Division of the New Zealand Ministry of Foreign Affairs and Trade from 2006–08 and Director of Personnel from 1998–2001.

Worker holds an MA (Hons) degree from Oxford University (Balliol College, 1974–77) and a Certificate of Proficiency in Economics from Auckland University (1978). He undertook his secondary education at Winchester College, UK.

Worker speaks Mandarin and Spanish in addition to his native English.

Worker served on the Council of Massey University from 2016–19.

Worker in 2016 was appointed as an honorary Ambassador for New Zealand Asian Leaders.

Married, with four children, Worker is a sixth generation New Zealander. His ancestors include "Albertlander" settlers of the Kaipara, Rev William Worker and Charles Cray; Norman Nash, settler of Foxton, who arrived at Wellington on "The Bolton" in 1840; and early Otago settlers Amos McKegg, proprietor of "The White House" at Henley, and Robert Robinson, farmer of Berwick.
