= Ross Ardern =

New Zealand police officer and diplomat (born 1954)

Administrator of Tokelau
- In office May 2018 – June 2022
- Ulu-o-Tokelau: Afega Gaualofa; Kerisiano Kalolo
- Preceded by: Jonathan Kings
- Succeeded by: Don Higgins

High Commissioner of New Zealand to Niue
- In office February 2014 – 2018
- Prime Minister: John Key; Bill English; Jacinda Ardern
- Preceded by: Mark Blumsky
- Succeeded by: Kirk Yates

Personal details
- Born: David Ross Ardern; 28 February 1954 (age 72) Te Aroha, New Zealand
- Spouse: Laurell Ardern
- Children: 2, including Jacinda Ardern
- Relatives: Clarke Gayford (son-in-law)
- Education: Royal New Zealand Police College

David Ross Ardern (born 28 February 1954) is a New Zealand diplomat and former police officer. He was the Administrator of Tokelau from 2018 to 2022, having previously served as the High Commissioner of New Zealand to Niue from 2014 to 2018, and as Niue's police commissioner from 2005 to 2009.

== Biography ==
Ardern joined the New Zealand Police in 1974, initially training at the Royal New Zealand Police College at Trentham, and was one of the police officers who carried out the Dawn Raids on Pacific Island families in the 1970s. In his 40-year police career he spent about 20 years in the Criminal Investigation Branch and five years as Matamata–Piako area sub-commander.

In 2002 Ardern received a Commissioner's Commendation for his work in the line of duty while investigating a robbery, kidnapping and sexual assault case in 1999. He successfully negotiated for three hours with a man armed with a machete.

Ardern was appointed Commissioner of Police for the Pacific island of Niue in 2005 for a two-year term, which was extended to four years. During this time he was chair of the Pacific Islands Chiefs of Police for one year. He also served as Niue's director of prisons and director of immigration.

Ardern served as New Zealand Police liaison officer for the South Pacific, based in Samoa, from 2009 to 2013.

In October 2013, Ardern was named by Minister of Foreign Affairs Murray McCully as the next High Commissioner of New Zealand to Niue. He took up the post in February 2014.

On 15 December 2017, the Minister of Foreign Affairs, Winston Peters, announced that Ardern would be the next Administrator of Tokelau, from early 2018.

Ardern is the father of the former New Zealand Prime Minister, Jacinda Ardern. He is a practising member of the Church of Jesus Christ of Latter-day Saints (LDS Church). His twin brother, Ian, is a general authority of the LDS Church.
