= Michael Powles =

New Zealand diplomat

High Commissioner of New Zealand to Fiji
- In office 1980–1982
- Preceded by: David Keith McDowell
- Succeeded by: Lindsay Watt

Ambassador of New Zealand to Indonesia
- In office 1982–1986
- Preceded by: Richard Nottage
- Succeeded by: Gordon Parkinson

Ambassador of New Zealand to China
- In office 1990–1993
- Preceded by: Lindsay Watt
- Succeeded by: Christopher Elder

Permanent Representative of New Zealand to the United Nations in New York
- In office 1996–2001
- Preceded by: Colin Keating
- Succeeded by: Don MacKay

Personal details
- Born: Michael John Powles; 24 July 1939 (age 86) Wellington, New Zealand
- Spouse: Dale Croucher (m. 1964, separated)
- Children: 3
- Relatives: Guy Powles (father)
- Education: Wanganui Collegiate School
- Alma mater: Victoria University of Wellington

Michael John Powles (born 24 July 1939) is a retired New Zealand diplomat. He served as Permanent Representative to the United Nations from 1996 to 2001 and as President of UNICEF in 1998.

== Career ==
- From 1962 to 1967 he exercised Private legal practice
- In 1967 he joined Ministry of Foreign Affairs and Trade (New Zealand), Wellington.
- From 1972 to 1975 he was clerk in the mission in Washington, D.C.
- From 1975 to 1977 he was deputy director of the External Aid department in the Ministry of Foreign Affairs and Trade (New Zealand).
- From 1977 to 1979 he was head of Australia and Americas department in the Ministry of Foreign Affairs and Trade (New Zealand).
- From 1980 to 1982 he was High Commissioner in Suva with commission in Tuvalu, Kiribati and Nauru.
- From 1982 to 1986 he was ambassador in Jakarta (Indonesia).
- From 1986 to 1989 he was Assistant Secretary of the Ministry of Foreign Affairs and Trade (New Zealand).
- From 1988 to 1989 he was Co-ord, Political, Security Affairs, department in the Ministry of Foreign Affairs and Trade (New Zealand).
- From 1990 to 1993 he was ambassador in Beijing.
- From 1996 to 2001 he was Permanent Representative in at the Headquarters of the United Nations in New York City.
