= Sinclair Wetlands =

Coordinates: 45.9749°S 170.1057°E

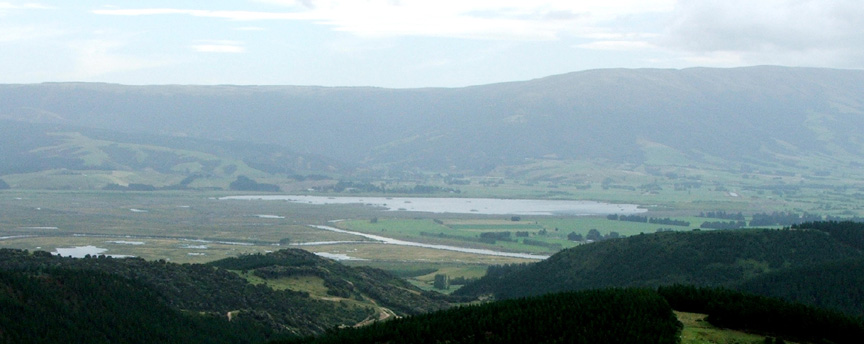
Lake Waipori and its surrounding wetlands, seen from the hills to the southeast. The Sinclair Wetlands are to the left of the picture

The Sinclair Wetlands (Te Nohoaka o Tukiauau) are an internationally renowned wetlands located to the south west of Dunedin, New Zealand, at the southern edge of the Taieri Plains. They are on the western side of Lake Waipori and approximately equidistant between Mosgiel and Milton. The protected area covers a little over 315 hectares (780 acres). Some of the area of the wetlands includes part of the bed of the former Lake Tatawai, drained for farmland in the 19th century.

The wetlands are home to many species of birds including scaup, swans and many more wetland waterfowl including the fernbird and rare bittern. A number of birds such as white herons and spoonbills occasionally frequent the area also.

The wetlands are named for Horace "Horrie" Sinclair, a local farmer who donated land to the wetlands scheme in 1984. An education centre opened in the late 1980s is located at the wetlands. The wetlands contain a small island (Whakaraupuka / Ram Island), which was in ancient times the location of a Māori settlement, Tukiauau Pā. The land containing the wetlands was returned to Ngāi Tahu as part of the 1998 Ngāi Tahu Claim Settlement Act.

In the 1986 New Year Honours, Horace Sinclair was appointed a Member of the Order of the British Empire, for services to conservation.

== Gallery ==
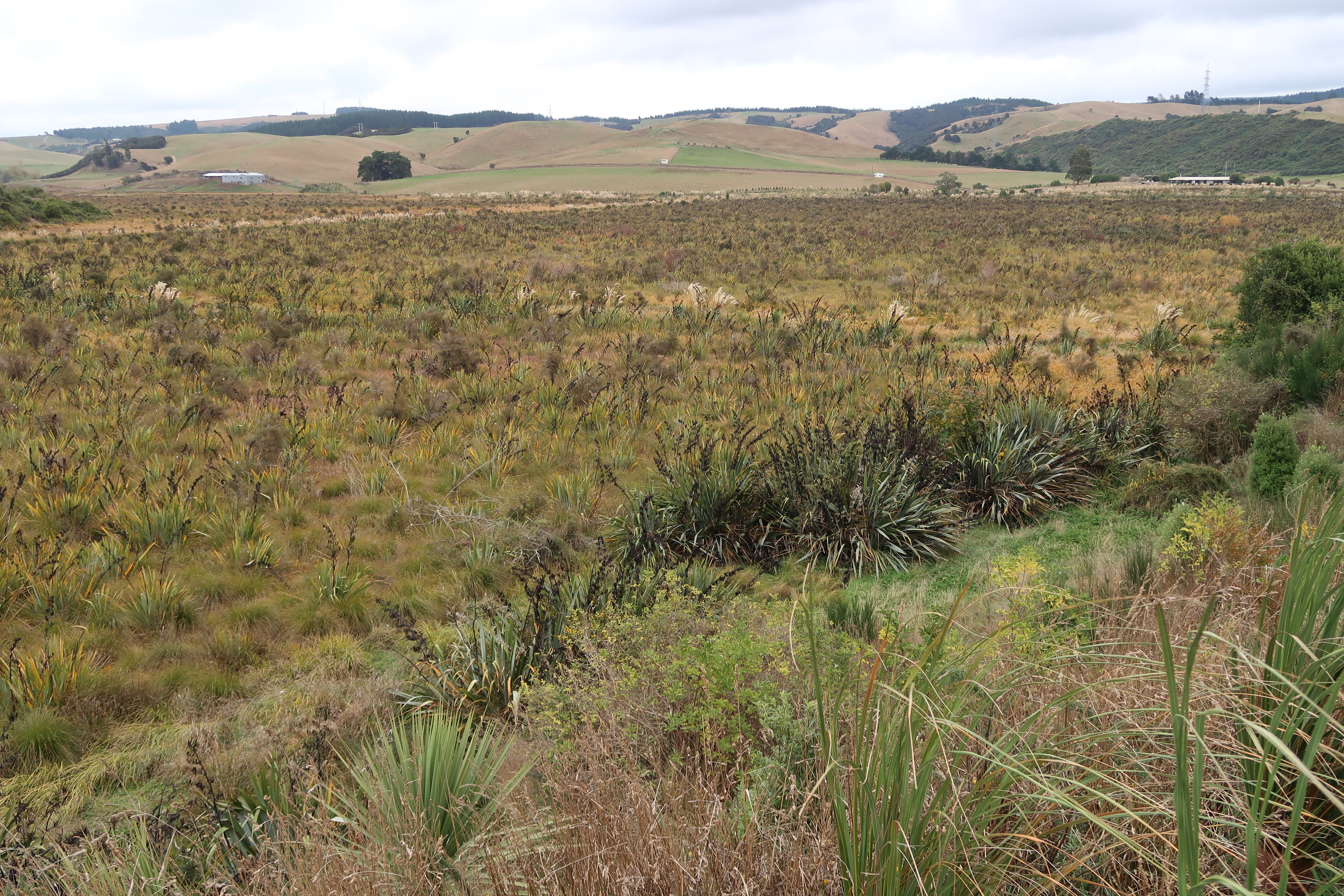

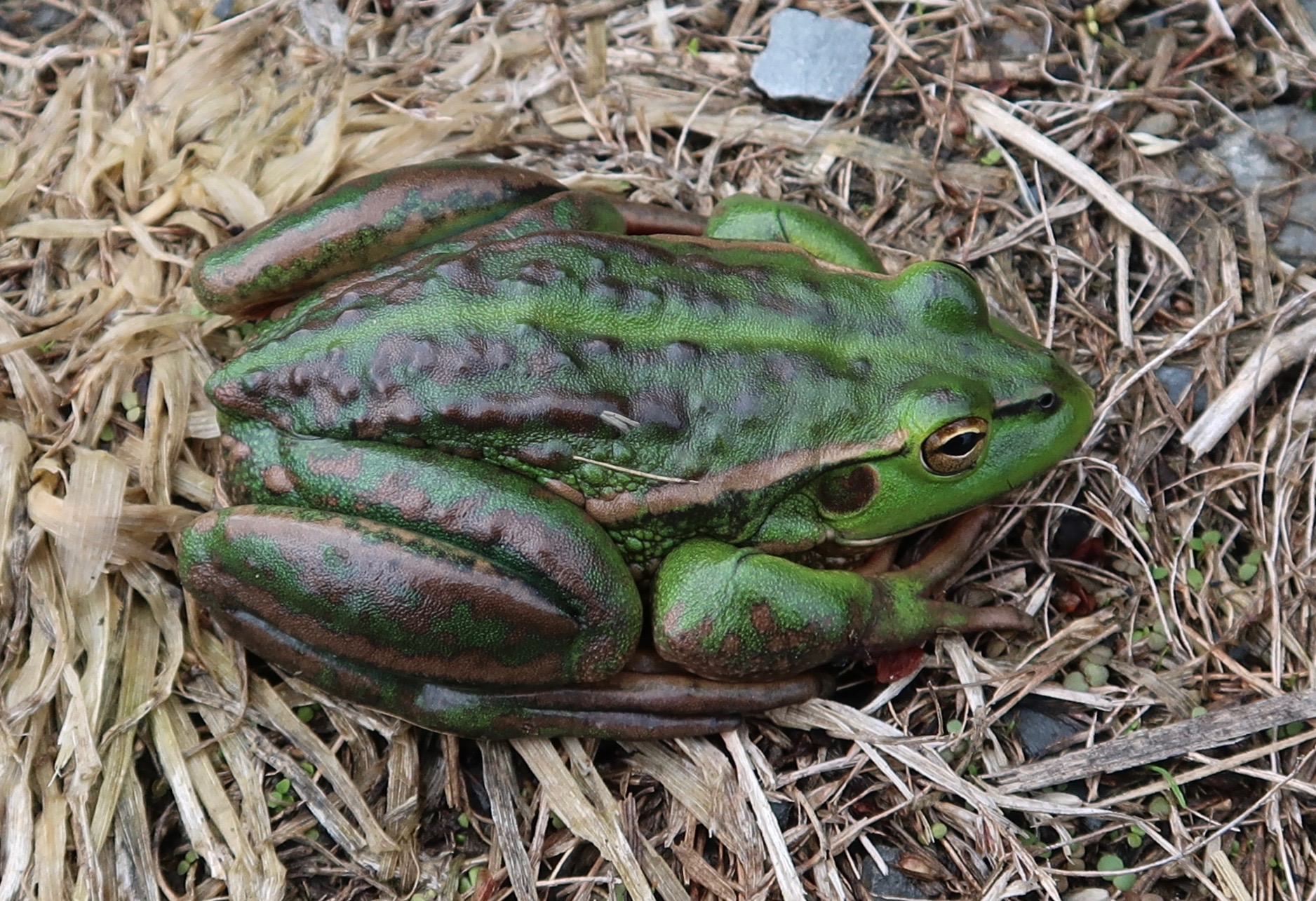
Southern bell frog (Ranoidea raniformis)

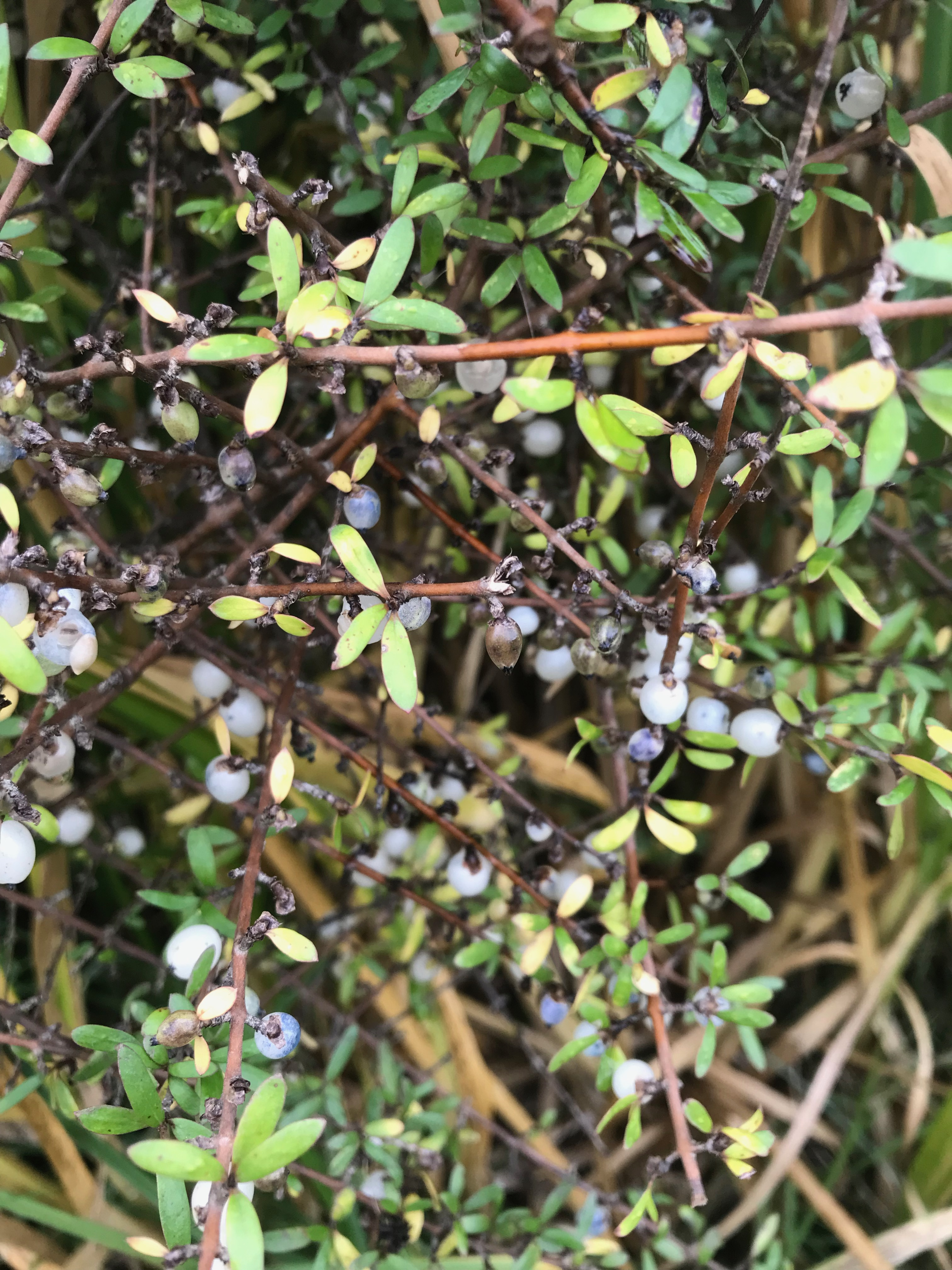
Miki (Coprosma propinqua)

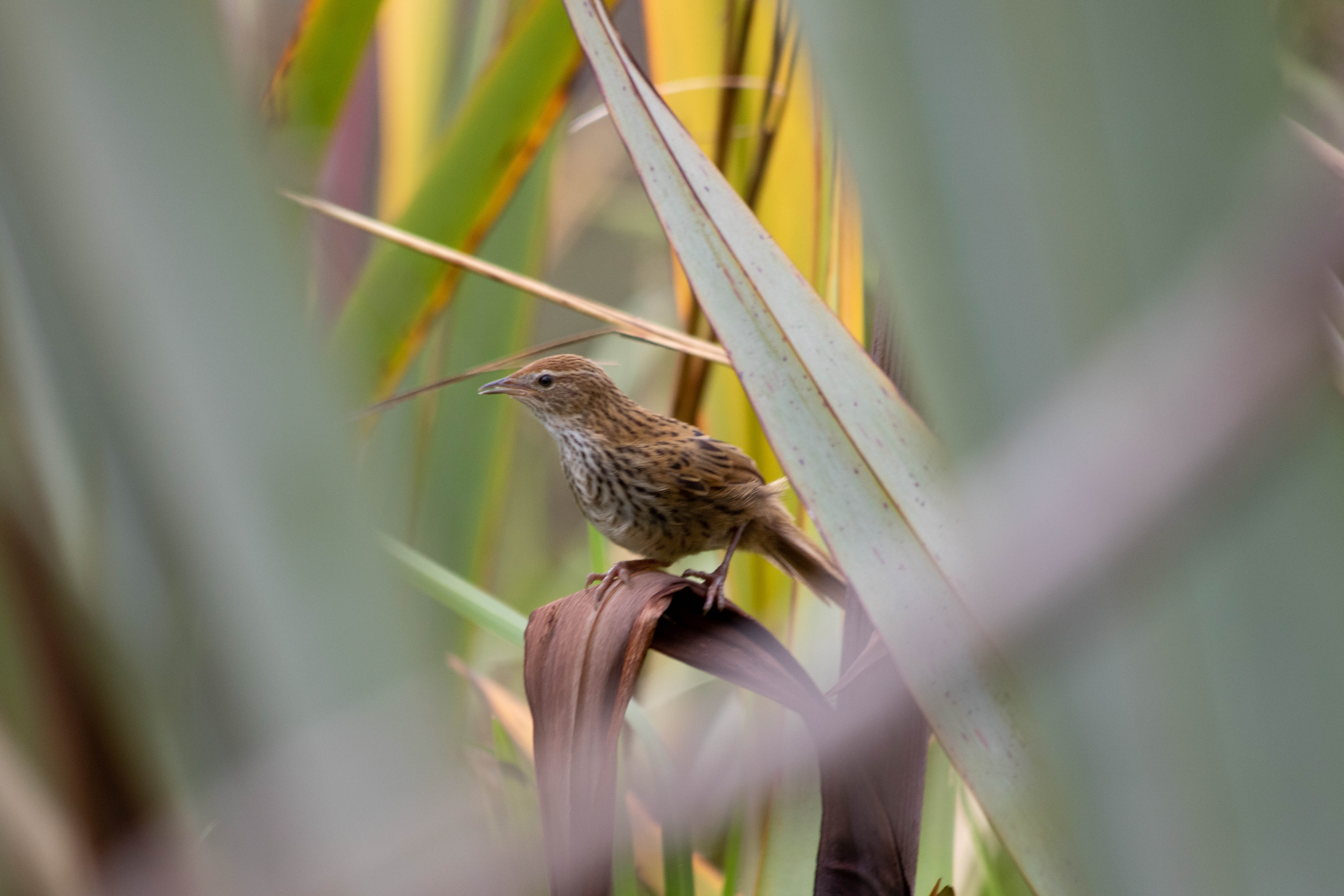
Fernbird/Mātātā (Bowdleria punctata)

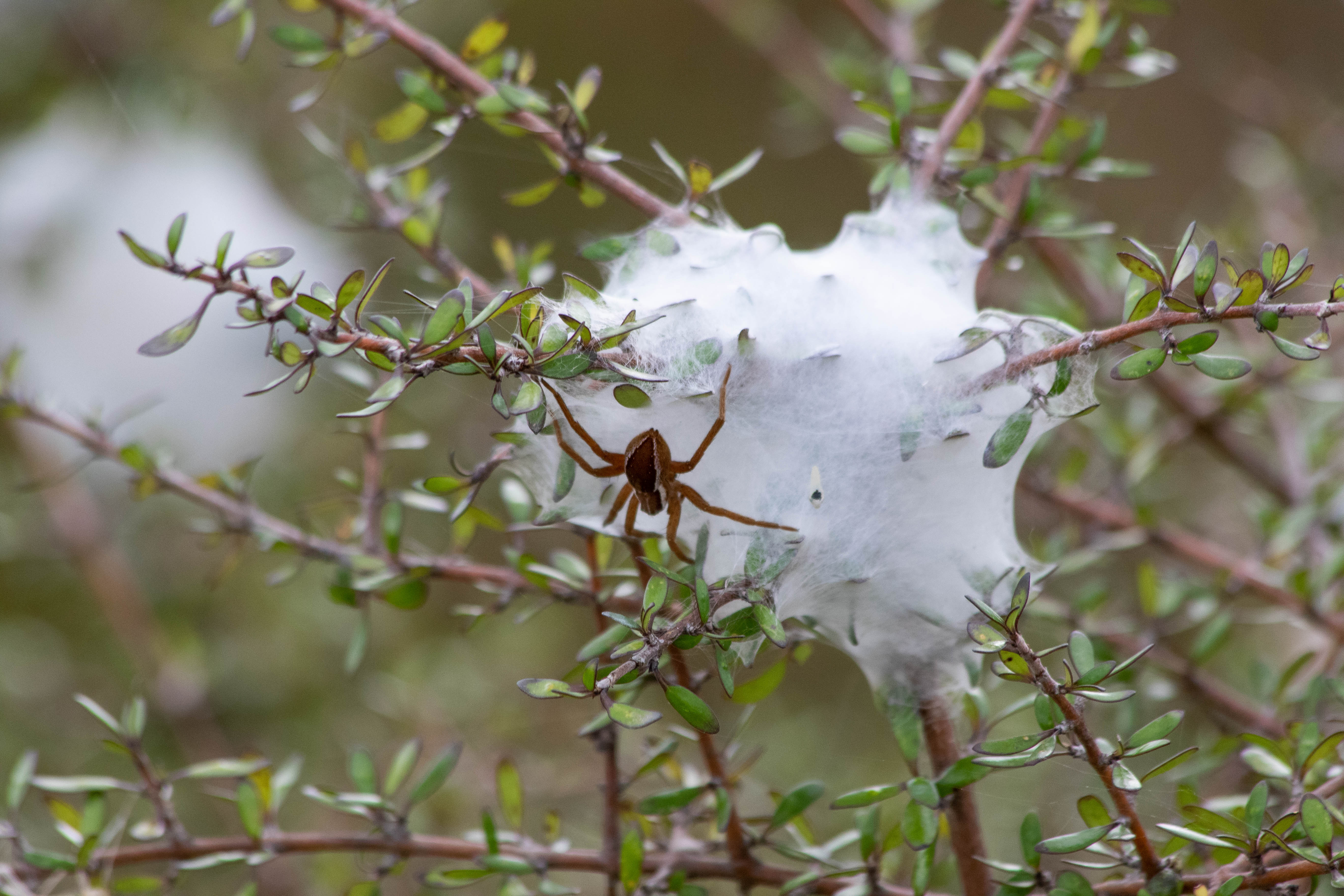
Nurseryweb spider (Dolomedes)
