= Argentina–New Zealand relations =

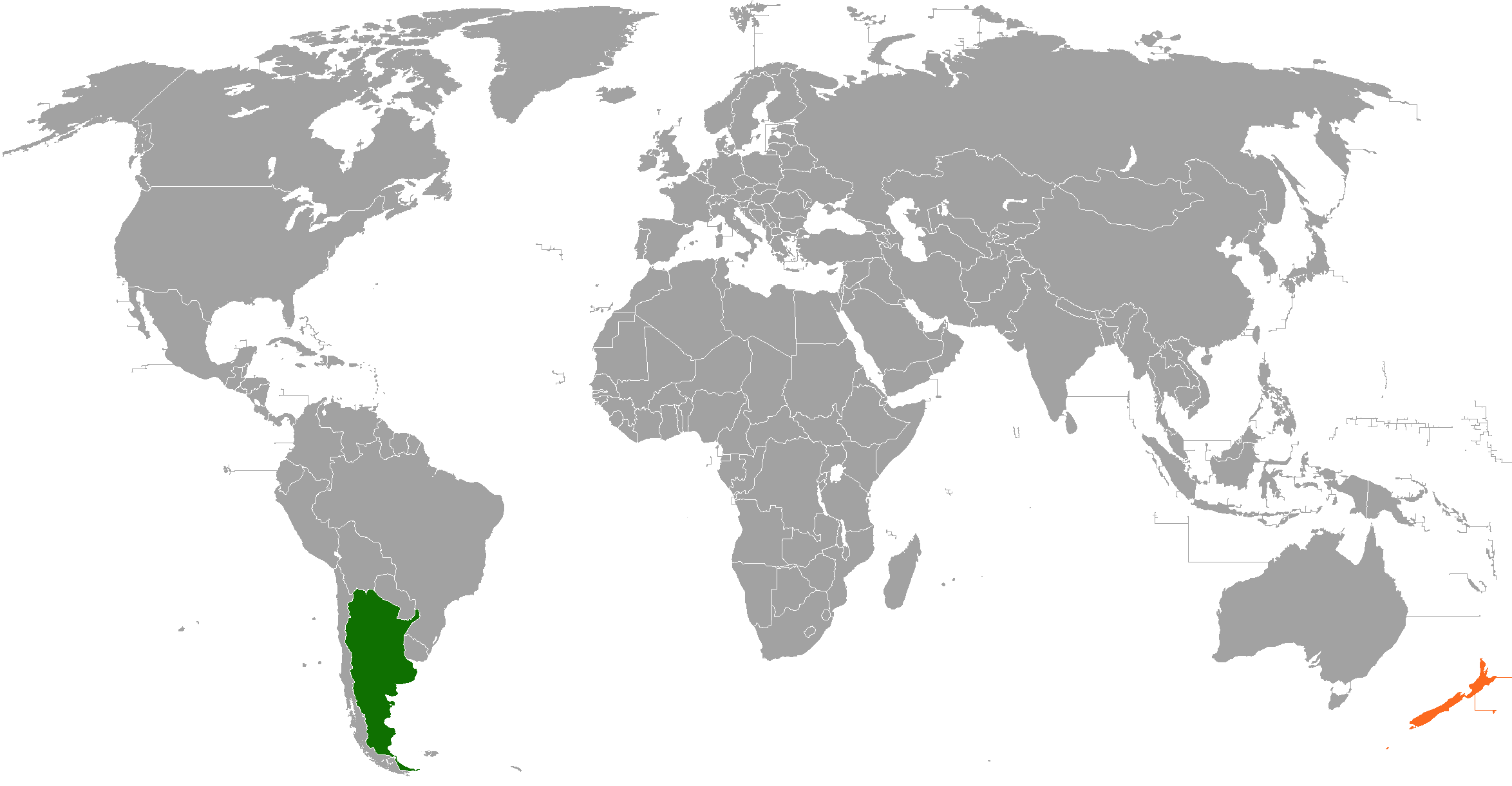

- Argentina: New Zealand

Diplomatic relations between Argentina and New Zealand, have existed for decades. Both nations are mutual members of the Cairns Group and the United Nations.

== History ==
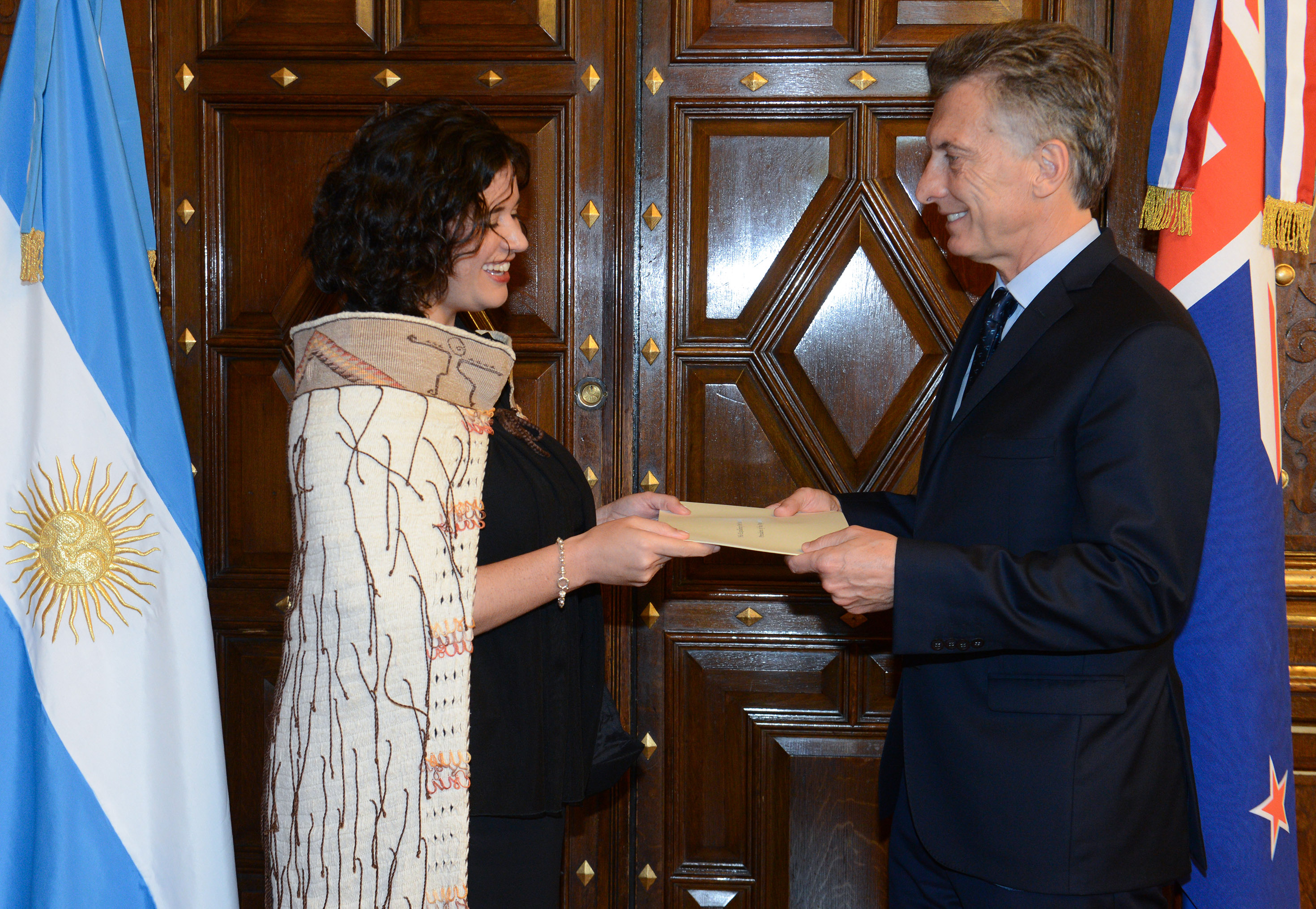
Argentine President Mauricio Macri receiving the letters of credence from New Zealand Ambassador Raylene Liufalani, 2016

Argentina and New Zealand are two industrialized southern hemisphere nations. Diplomatic relations between both nations were established in 1964. Relations, however, between the two nations were very limited, in part because of the distance between them. It wasn't until 1977 that Argentina opened an embassy in Wellington.

In 1976, Argentina came under a military dictatorship which became increasingly dictatorial and nationalistic, in particular towards Chile. In April 1982, it invaded the Falklands Islands, triggering the Falklands War with Britain, which Argentina lost. Immediately after the invasion. New Zealand severed diplomatic relations with the Argentine government and imposed economic sanctions. After the war, New Zealand re-established diplomatic relations. In 1987, Argentina opened a consulate in Auckland and re-opened its embassy in Wellington in 1997. In April 1998, Argentina's President, Carlos Menem, paid a visit to New Zealand and met with New Zealand Prime Minister Jenny Shipley. That same year, New Zealand re-opened its embassy in Buenos Aires.

Since the re-establishment of relations, both counties have worked together to improve global agricultural trade, preserve Antarctica and the Southern Ocean, and lobby the international community for awareness of climate change, whale conservation, international human rights, peace-keeping and non-proliferation of weapons. In November 2001, New Zealand's Prime Minister, Helen Clark, paid a visit to Argentina. Both countries have established a working holiday visa scheme. In December 2015, Air New Zealand began direct flights between Auckland and Buenos Aires. In 2017, Argentina's Secretary of Agriculture, Ricardo Negri, visited New Zealand.

In January 2026, Deputy Prime Minister David Seymour and his partner Alexandra Martelli visited the Argentinian President Javier Milei and Argentinian Foreign Minister Pablo Quirno. This was followed by a second visit by a parliamentary and business delegation led by New Zealand Foreign Minister Winston Peters on 4 March 2026. While the New Zealand parliamentary delegation visited the Argentine National Congress, Peters met with Milei and Quirno.

== High-level visits ==
=== High-level visits from Argentina to New Zealand ===
- President Jorge Rafael Videla (1980)
- President Raúl Alfonsín (1986)
- President Carlos Menem (1998)
- Secretary of Agriculture Ricardo Negri (2017)

=== High-level visits from New Zealand to Argentina ===
- Prime Minister Helen Clark (2001)
- Foreign Minister Winston Peters (2007)
- Foreign Minister Murray McCully (2010)
- Deputy Prime Minister David Seymour (January 2026)
- Foreign Minister Winston Peters (2026)

== Trade ==
In 2016, total trade between Argentina and New Zealand totaled US$199 million. Argentina's main exports to New Zealand include: soya bean oil cake, sugar, prepared and preserved fruits and nuts, and vehicles. New Zealand's main exports to Argentina include: paper products, aircraft, machinery, albuminoids, starches and glues, and electrical machinery.

== Resident diplomatic missions ==
- Argentina has an embassy in Wellington.
- New Zealand has an embassy in Buenos Aires.

== See also ==
- List of ambassadors of New Zealand to Argentina
