= Dorothea Horsman =

New Zealand women's rights advocate

Dame Dorothea Horsman DBE JP
- Born: Dorothea Jean Morrell; 17 April 1918; Wellington, New Zealand
- Died: 7 January 1994 (aged 75); Dunedin, New Zealand
- Occupations: Teacher; community worker
- Known for: Women's rights advocacy
- Spouse: Alan Horsman (m. 1943)
- Children: 3

Dame Dorothea Jean Horsman DBE JP (née Morrell; 17 April 1918 – 7 January 1994) was a New Zealand women's rights advocate.

== Biography ==
Horsman was born Dorothea Jean Morrell in Wellington on 17 April 1918, the daughter of Jean Morrell (née Morris) and Samuel Tankard Morrell. She was educated at Auckland Girls' Grammar School, and went on to study at Auckland Teachers' College and Auckland University College, graduating Master of Arts with second-class honours in 1941.

She married Ernest Alan Horsman on 16 December 1943.

Horsman worked as a schoolteacher from 1941 until 1945. After World War II, she travelled to the United Kingdom with her husband, where he first undertook postgraduate studies at St Catherine's College, Oxford, and then lectured at Durham University between 1947 and 1956.

When Alan Horsman was appointed professor of English at the University of Otago in Dunedin in 1957, Dorothea and Alan Horsman and their three children returned to New Zealand. Dorothea Horsman became active in various university and community groups in Dunedin, including the Fortune Theatre, the YWCA and Marriage Guidance. She joined the Federation of University Women (FUW), and became the FUW's representative on the National Council of Women. She also undertook postgraduate study, completing a second Master of Arts degree, on Russian literature, in 1969. The title of her thesis was Some secondary characters in Dostoevsky: studied in relation to the main characters.

Horsman served as president of the Federation of University Women from 1973 to 1976, and president of the National Council of Women from 1982 to 1986. She led the New Zealand delegation at the International Council of Women conferences in 1979 and 1986, and council in 1983. She also was leader of the New Zealand delegation to the International FUW conference in 1974. In 1979, she was appointed a justice of the peace. From 1980 to 1983, Horsman was president of the Arthritis Foundation of New Zealand. She was a member of the Churchill Memorial Trust Board from 1983 to 1989, and served on the Working Party on Liquor, established by the government, from 1985 to 1986.

Horsman wrote two reports that focused on the role of women in contemporary society in the 1970s: What Price Equality? in 1974, which was commissioned by the National Council of Women, and investigated equal pay for women; and Women at Home, in 1976 for the Federation of University Women.

Horsman died in Dunedin on 7 January 1994, and her ashes were buried in Andersons Bay Cemetery. Her husband, Alan Horsman, died in 2019.

== Honours and awards ==
In 1977, Horsman was awarded the Queen Elizabeth II Silver Jubilee Medal. In the 1986 New Year Honours, she was appointed a Dame Commander of the Order of the British Empire, for services to the community.
