= Richard Atkins (diplomat) =

New Zealand public servant and diplomat (1931–1998)

Richard Atkins MBE

2nd Ambassador of New Zealand to China
- In office 1975–1979
- Preceded by: Bryce Harland
- Succeeded by: Harle Freeman-Greene

Personal details
- Born: Richard Brian Atkins; 12 August 1931 Christchurch, New Zealand
- Died: 10 February 1998 (aged 66) Wellington, New Zealand
- Spouse: Avril Jill Cassels (m. 1954)
- Children: 2
- Education: St Andrews College
- Alma mater: Canterbury University College

Richard Brian Atkins MBE (12 August 1931 – 10 February 1998) was a New Zealand public servant and diplomat.

== Early life and family ==
Born in Christchurch on 12 August 1931, Atkins was the son of John A. Atkins. He was educated at St Andrew's College, Christchurch, and went on to study at Canterbury University College, graduating Master of Arts with first-class honours in 1954.

On 31 December 1954, Atkins married Avril Jill Cassels, and the couple went on to have two children.

== Career ==
Atkins joined the Department of External Affairs in 1954. From 1956 to 1960 he was third secretary and then second secretary at the New Zealand Mission to the United Nations in New York. Returning to New Zealand, he then served as acting head of the United Nations and Asian Division in the Department of External Affairs from 1960 to 1963. Between 1963 and 1966, he was first secretary and then counsellor at the New Zealand High Commission in London, and then served as head of the South Pacific and Antarctic affairs division of the Department of External Affairs (known as the Ministry of Foreign Affairs from 1969) from 1966 until 1970.

From 1970, he had a series of overseas postings: as counselor at the New Zealand embassy in Rome from 1970 to 1973; minister in Washington, D. C. from 1973 to 1975; and then New Zealand ambassador to China in Beijing from 1975 to 1979.

Atkins later served as director of the External Intelligence Bureau, in the Department of the Prime Minister and Cabinet in Wellington.

== Honours ==
In the 1986 New Year Honours, Atkins was appointed a Member of the Order of the British Empire.

== Death ==
Atkins died in Wellington on 10 February 1998.
