= Lake Tatawai =

New Zealand tidal freshwater lake

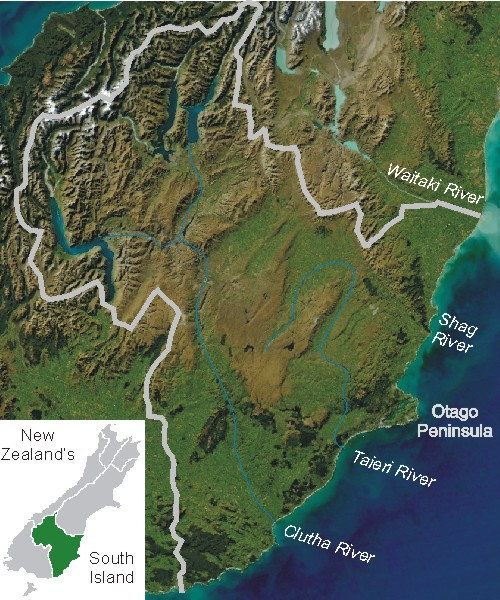
- Location within Otago peninsula
- Location: Taieri Plains, Otago Region, South Island
- Coordinates: 45.962017°S 170.134983°E
- Primary outflows: Lake Waipori
- Basin countries: New Zealand

Lake Tatawai was a tidal freshwater lake located immediately north of Lake Waipori in Otago, in New Zealand's South Island.

It is one of the historical lakes that was drained soon after European Settlement of the Taieri Plains. Lake Tatawai drained into Lake Waipori by a small channel, and ultimately into the Taieri. It was a very shallow lake and would have originally been surrounded by wetlands.

== See also ==
- Sinclair Wetlands
