= Peter Adam =

Peter Adam may refer to:

- Peter Adam (filmmaker) (1929–2019), British filmmaker and author
- Peter Adam (minister) (born 1946), Australian Christian minister
- Peter R. Adam (1957–2023), German film editor

== See also ==
- Peter Adams (disambiguation)
