= Clare Fearnley =

New Zealand diplomat

Clare Fearnley is a diplomat from New Zealand who was the Ambassador to China and Mongolia. At the time of her appointment, Fearnley was Ambassador to South Korea (cross-accredited to Pyongyang) and had been Acting Director-General Legal at the Ministry of Foreign Affairs and Trade and Consul-General in Shanghai.

Fearnley earned arts and law degrees from Canterbury University, studied at Beijing University and at the Beijing Languages Institute in the 1980s. She is a native Mandarin speaker.
