= List of ambassadors of New Zealand to South Korea =

Ambassador of New Zealand to South Korea
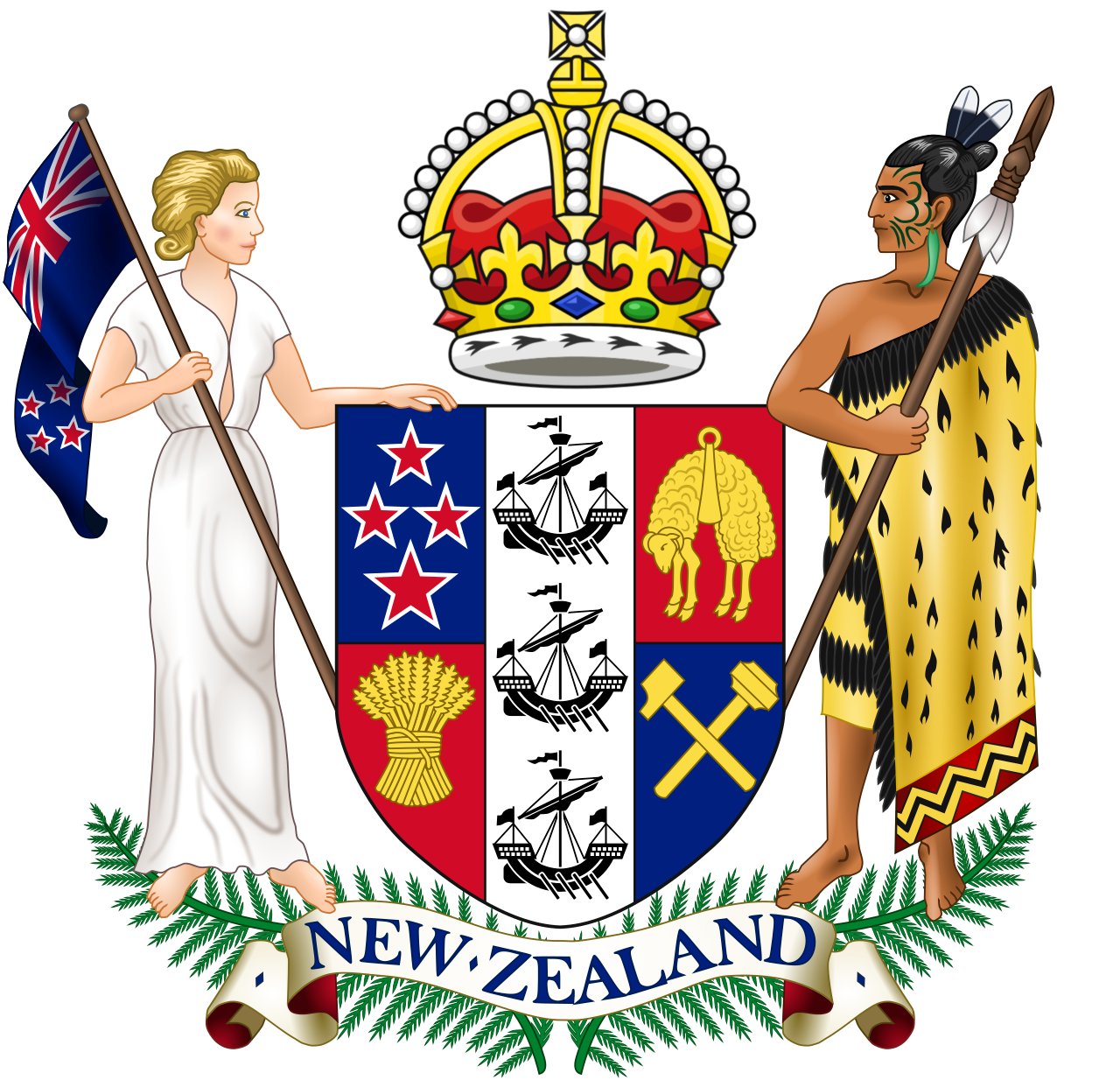
- Incumbent; Dawn Bennet since 2023
- Seat: Embassy of New Zealand, Seoul
- Inaugural holder: Ted Farnon
- Formation: 1976

The Ambassador from New Zealand to South Korea is New Zealand's foremost diplomatic representative in the Republic of Korea, and in charge of New Zealand's diplomatic mission in South Korea.

The embassy is located in Seoul, South Korea's capital city. New Zealand has maintained a resident ambassador in South Korea since 1976. The Ambassador to South Korea is concurrently accredited to North Korea.

== List of heads of mission ==
=== Ambassadors to South Korea ===
==== Non-resident ambassadors, resident in Japan ====
- Ted Taylor (1962–1965)
- John Scott (1965–1969)
- Hunter Wade (1969–1972)
- Tom Larkin (1972–1976)

==== Resident ambassadors ====
- Ted Farnon (1976–1980)
- David Holborow (1980–1984)
- Chris Butler (1984–1990)
- Peter Kennedy (1993–1995)
- Gerald McGhie (1996–1999)
- Roy Ferguson (1999–2002)
- David Taylor (2002–2006)
- Jane Coombs (2006–2008)
- Richard Mann (2009–2012)
- Patrick Rata (2012–2014)
- Clare Fearnley (2015-2017), cross-accredited to Pyongyang
- Philip Turner (2018–2023)
- Dawn Bennet (2023-present)
