= List of ambassadors of New Zealand to Argentina =

The Ambassador from New Zealand to Argentina is New Zealand's foremost diplomatic representative in the Argentine Republic, and in charge of New Zealand's diplomatic mission in Argentina.

The embassy is located in Buenos Aires, Argentina's capital city. New Zealand has maintained a resident ambassador in Argentina since 1998. The Ambassador to Argentina is concurrently accredited to Paraguay and Uruguay.

== List of heads of mission ==
=== Ambassadors to Argentina ===
==== Non-resident ambassadors, resident in Lima ====
- Peter Bennett (1987–1988)
- Barry Brooks (1988–1990)

==== Non-resident ambassadors, resident in Santiago ====
- Paul Tipping (1990–1992)
- Frank Wilson (1992–1996)
- David McKee (1996–1998)

==== Resident ambassadors ====
- Caroline Forsyth (1998–2001)
- Carl Worker (2001–2005)
- Lucy Duncan (2005–2010)
- Darryl Dunn (2010–2013)
- Hayden Montgomery (2013–2016)
- Carl Worker (2019–2023)

== See also ==
- Argentina–New Zealand relations
