= List of ambassadors of New Zealand to China =

The Ambassador from New Zealand to China is New Zealand's foremost diplomatic representative in China, and in charge of New Zealand's diplomatic mission in China.

The embassy is located in Beijing, China's capital city. New Zealand has maintained a resident ambassador in China since 1973. The Ambassador to China is concurrently accredited to Mongolia.

== List of heads of mission ==
=== Ambassadors to China ===
- Bryce Harland (1973–1976)
- Richard Atkins (1976–1979)
- Harle Freeman-Greene (1979–1982)
- Francis Anthony Small (1982–1985)
- Lindsay Johnstone Watt (1985–1990)
- Michael Powles (1990–1993)
- Christopher Elder (1993–1998)
- Peter Adams (1998–2001)
- John McKinnon (2001–2004)
- Tony Browne (2004–2009)
- Carl Worker (2009–2015)
- John McKinnon (January 2015 – 2017)
- Clare Fearnley (2017–2022)
- Grahame Morton (2022–present)
