= List of ambassadors of New Zealand to Indonesia =

The Ambassador from New Zealand to Indonesia is New Zealand's foremost diplomatic representative in the Republic of Indonesia, and in charge of New Zealand's diplomatic mission in Indonesia.

The embassy is located in South Jakarta, Indonesia's capital city. New Zealand has maintained a resident ambassador in Indonesia since 1968, and a resident Head of Mission since 1961.

== List of heads of mission ==
=== Consuls-General to Indonesia ===
- Duncan McFadyen Rae (1961–1963)

=== Chargés d'Affaires in Indonesia ===
- Duncan McFadyen Rae (1963)
- Paul Edmonds (1963–1964)

=== Ministers in Indonesia ===
- Reuel Lochore (1964–1966)

=== Ambassadors to Indonesia ===
- Bill Challis (1968–1971)
- Basil Bolt (1971–1973)
- Ray Jermyn (1973–1976)
- Roger Peren (1976–1980)
- Richard Nottage (1980–1982)
- Michael Powles (1982–1986)
- Gordon Parkinson (1986–1990)
- Neil Walter (1990–1994)
- Tim Groser (1994–1997)
- Michael Green (1997–2001)
- Christopher Elder (2001–2006)
- Phillip Gibson (2006–2010)
- David Taylor (2010–2014)
- Dr Trevor Matheson (2015–2019)
- Dr Jonathan Austin (2019–2021)
- Kevin Burnett (2021-2025)
- Phillip Taula (2025-)
