= Peter Adams (diplomat) =

New Zealand writer, poet and diplomat

Ambassador of New Zealand to China
- In office 1998–2001
- Preceded by: Christopher Elder
- Succeeded by: John McKinnon

Personal details
- Born: 1944 (age 81–82)
- Education: 1966–1970: Rhodes Scholar - New College University of Canterbury, University of Canterbury; MA (Hons) 1st Class, History; 1971–1974: D.Phil., history: University of Oxford

Peter Adams (born 1944) is a New Zealand writer, poet and retired diplomat.

In 1977, while at Oxford University on a Rhodes scholarship, he researched and wrote Fatal Necessity: British Intervention in New Zealand, 1830–1847, which went on to win the 1978 PEN International Award for non-fiction. From 1977, Adams worked in the New Zealand Agency for International Development. He was then employed in the headquarters of the United Nations in New York City, in Washington, D.C., and in Suva (Fiji).

In 1985, he was deputy director of the South Pacific Bureau of Economic Cooperation (SPEC). From 1998 to February 2001, he was ambassador in Beijing. In 2001, he was briefly the head of the Development Cooperation Division at the Ministry of Foreign Affairs and Trade, before becoming the executive director of the New Zealand Agency for International Development from February 2002 until his retirement in 2009.

He lives in Wellington and writes short fiction and poetry.
