= Don Higgins =

Administrator of Tokelau

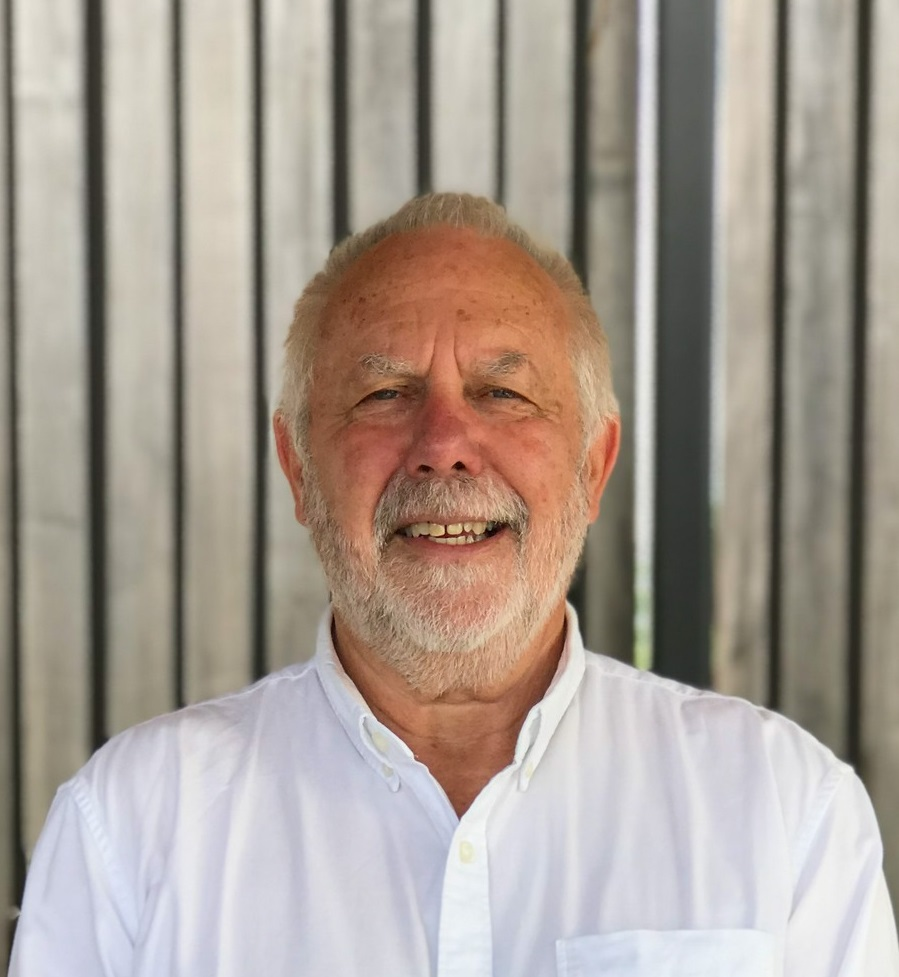
- Higgins in 2022

Administrator of Tokelau
- In office 2022–2026
- Ulu-o-Tokelau: Siopili Perez; Kelihiano Kalolo; Alapati Tavite; Esera Fofō Tuisano
- Preceded by: Ross Ardern
- Succeeded by: Andre van der Walt

Don Higgins is a New Zealand public servant and diplomat who was appointed Administrator of Tokelau in June 2022. He served in that role until 2026. Higgins previously served as High Commissioner of New Zealand to the Solomon Islands, and from 2014 to 2016 as High Commissioner to Kiribati.

On 1 June 2022, the Minister for Foreign Affairs, Nanaia Mahuta, announced Higgins' appointment as the Administrator of Tokelau.
