= 1986 New Year Honours (New Zealand) =

Annual awards for New Zealanders

The 1986 New Year Honours in New Zealand were appointments by Elizabeth II on the advice of the New Zealand government to various orders and honours to reward and highlight good works by New Zealanders. The awards celebrated the passing of 1985 and the beginning of 1986, and were announced on 31 December 1985.

The recipients of honours are displayed here as they were styled before their new honour.

== Knight Bachelor ==
- Thomas Edwin Clark – of Auckland. For services to manufacturing, export, sport and the community.
- Leonard Bingley Southward OBE – of Paraparaumu. For services to the community, especially the disabled.
- The Honourable Reginald Stephen Garfield Todd – of Zimbabwe. For services to Africa and New Zealand.
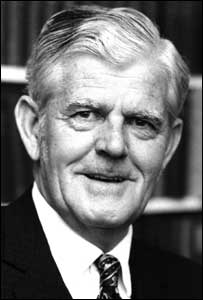
Sir Garfield Todd

== Order of the Bath ==
=== Companion (CB) ===
Civil division

- Dr Mervyn Charles Probine – of Lower Hutt; chairman, State Services Commission.

Military division

- Major General John Airth Mace OBE – Generals' List.
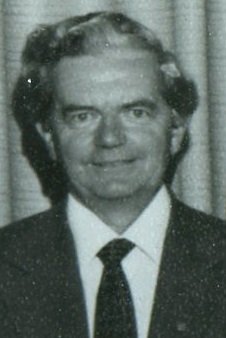
Mervyn Probine

== Order of Saint Michael and Saint George ==
=== Companion (CMG) ===
- Bruce James Cameron – of Wellington; lately deputy Secretary for Justice.
- James Thompson Graham – of Putāruru; chairman, New Zealand Dairy Board.

== Order of the British Empire ==
=== Dame Commander (DBE) ===
Civil division

- Dorothea Jean Horsman JP – of Dunedin. For services to the community.

=== Knight Commander (KBE) ===
Civil division

- Dr Neil Colquhoun Begg OBE – of Dunedin. For services to the New Zealand Historic Places Trust and the community.

Military division

- Air Marshal David Ewan Jamieson CB OBE – Royal New Zealand Air Force, Chief of Defence Staff.

=== Commander (CBE) ===
Civil division

- Dr Ronald Albert Barker – of Wellington; Director-General of Health.
- The Reverend David Bruce Gordon – of Auckland. For services to the Methodist Church and welfare.
- Mary Alice Hopkirk MBE – of Christchurch. For services to the girl guide movement and the community.
- Ross Malcolm Jansen JP – of Hamilton. For services to the City of Hamilton and local government.
- Hugh Allen Mills MBE JP – of Rotorua. For services to local-body and community affairs.
- Professor Alan Lee Titchener – of Auckland. For services to engineering.

Military division

- Air Commodore Frederick Martin Kinvig OBE AFC – Royal New Zealand Air Force.

=== Officer (OBE) ===
Civil division

- James Alder Bateman – of Wellington; principal, Central Institute of Technology.
- Professor Bruce Grandison Biggs – of Auckland. For services to Māori studies and linguistics.
- Melville Raymond Clinton – of Christchurch. For services to rugby league.
- Dr Ashton John Fitchett – of Wellington. For services to Royal New Zealand College of General Practitioners and the community.
- Evan John Haine – of Wellington. For services to the community.
- Wallace Robert Armstead Lake JP – of Wellington. For services to social welfare and the community.
- Robert Thomas Lorimer – of Auckland. For services as general manager, Auckland Harbour Board.
- Ian Robert Clark McDonald – of Paekākāriki; lately chief director, Department of Scientific and Industrial Research.
- Robert Dugald McKenzie JP – of Invercargill. For services to local-body and community affairs.
- James Archibald Delacourt Nash – of Lower Hutt. For services to the Anglican Church and science.
- Alexander David Paterson JP – of Feilding. For services to scouting, tourism and the community.
- Edward Graham Perry GM – lately Deputy Assistant Commissioner, New Zealand Police.
- Francis Dennis Sharp – of Auckland. For services to sport.
- David Shenker – of Melbourne, Australia. For services to trade-union affairs.
- Cecil Stanley Stevens – of Christchurch. For services to meat export and sport.
- Huhurere Tukukino – of Thames. For services to the community.
- Ivor Charles Wesley QFSM – of New Plymouth; Fire Commissioner, New Zealand Fire Service.

Military division

- Commander Michael Robert Pate – Royal New Zealand Navy.
- Colonel Michael John Dudman LVO – Colonels' List.
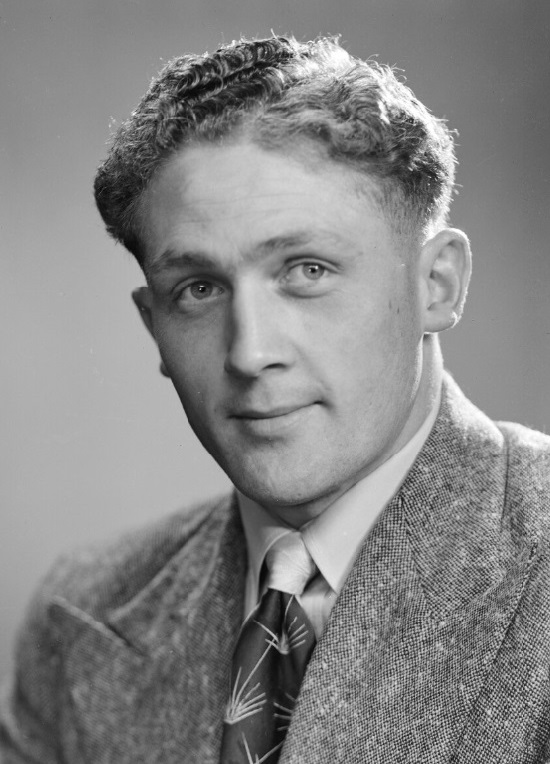
Jim Bateman

=== Member (MBE) ===
Civil division

- Joseph Francis Aspell – of Wellington. For services to local-body and community affairs.
- Richard Brian Atkins – of Wellington; lately director, External Intelligence Bureau, Prime Minister's Department.
- Henry James Bean – of Auckland. For services to local government.
- Huia Wiremu Beaumont – of CHristchurch. For services to education and the community.
- Hugh Brown JP – of Auckland. For services to the community.
- Kenneth Ronald Butson JP – of Napier. For services to the community.
- Bing Foon Chin – of Dunedin. For services to the community.
- Dr Vivienne Alice Croxford – of Christchurch. For services to medicine, especially obstetrics and gynaecology.
- Susan Elizabeth Devoy – of Rotorua. For services to squash.
- The Reverend Alister Gibson Dunn – of Auckland. For welfare services.
- Arthur Lawrence Familton – of Oamaru. For services to the community.
- William Taitoko James (Billy T. James) – of Auckland. For services to entertainment.
- Mary Gertrude McGowan (Sister Mary Gertrude) – of Gisborne. For services to education.
- Randolph William McMillan QFSM – of Temuka. For services to local government.
- William Stanley Partel – of Wellington; deputy Secretary of Energy, Mines Division, Ministry of Energy.
- The Reverend Tereu Taria Tuakanau Upu Pere – of Tokoroa. For services to the Pacific Islanders' Presbyterian Church.
- Joseph Rooney – of Tūrangi. For services to the community and sport.
- Horace Alexander Sinclair – of Dunedin. For services to conservation.
- Max Charles Stewart – of Auckland. For services to sport.
- Te Rau Whiro Tibble MC – of Gisborne. For services to the community.
- Alex Wyllie – of Glenmark. For services to rugby football.
- Bernard Zeff – of Christchurch. For services to the apparel industry and export.

Military division

- Warrant Officer Seaman Ian William Reid – Royal New Zealand Navy.
- Captain and Quartermaster Kenneth Edward McKee Wright – Royal New Zealand Infantry Regiment.
- Squadron Leader Dieter John Woods – Royal New Zealand Air Force.
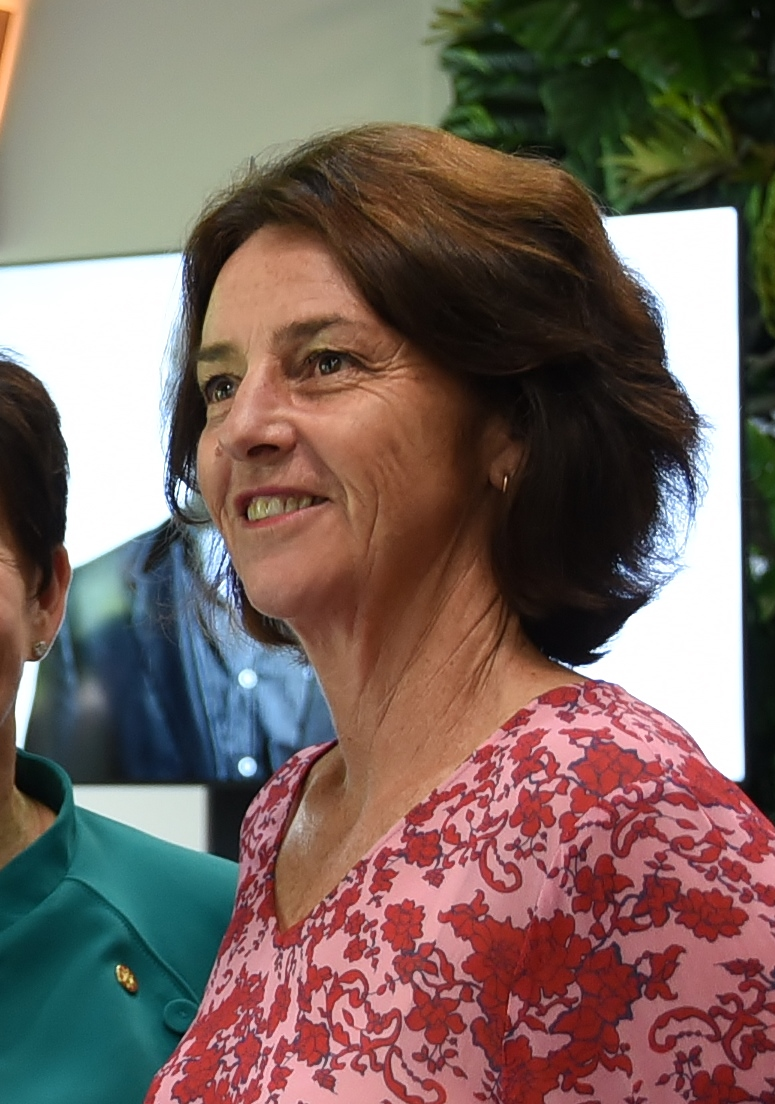
Susan Devoy

== British Empire Medal (BEM) ==
Military division

- Sergeant (now Temporary Staff Sergeant) Gregory James Astwood – Royal New Zealand Infantry Regiment.
- Corporal (now Temporary Sergeant) Peter Matthew Lowen – Royal New Zealand Air Force.

== Companion of the Queen's Service Order (QSO) ==
=== For community service ===
- John Arthur Gillies MBE – of Wānaka.
- Thea Dale, Lady Muldoon – of Auckland.
- Sheila Mary O'Toole (Sister Mary Laurence) – of Savaiʻi, Western Samoa.
- Mabel Almey Mary Pruden – of Christchurch.
- Ethel May (Maimie) Raper – of Auckland.
- Cherry Raymond (Mrs Metcalf) – of Auckland.
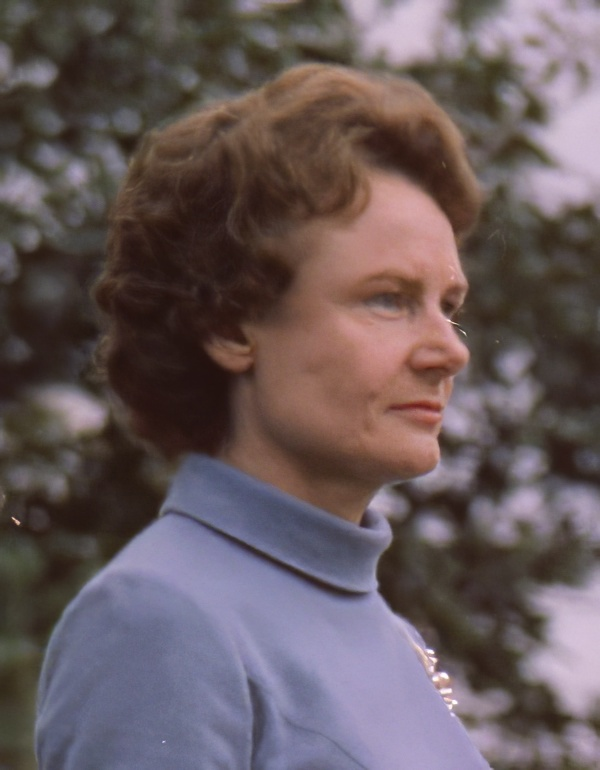
Thea, Lady Muldoon

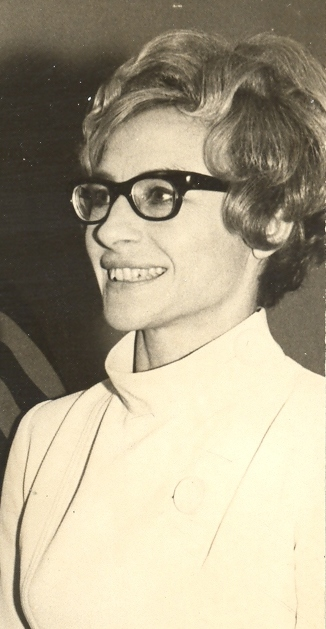
Cherry Raymond

=== For public services ===
- Ronald Morrison Barclay MBE JP – of New Plymouth.
- Dr Graham Wesley Butler – of Wellington; lately director-general, Department of Scientific and Industrial Research.
- Harry Bayliss Goodman – of Gisborne.
- John Lionel Hayes JP – of Kaeo.
- The Honourable David Allan Highet – of Auckland.
- Dorothy Catherine Jelicich – of Auckland.
- The Honourable Thomas Malcolm McGuigan – of Christchurch.
- Patrick John McKone – of Lower Hutt; lately Comptroller of Customs.
- Valerie O'Sullivan – of Matamata.
- Alison Mary Roxburgh JP – of Nelson.
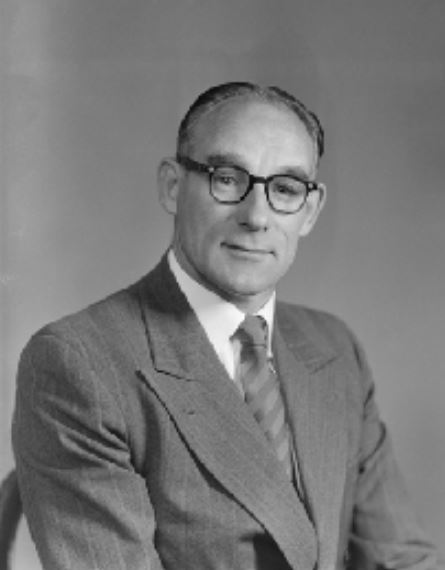
Ron Barclay

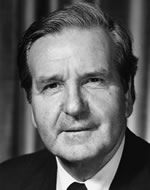
Allan Highet

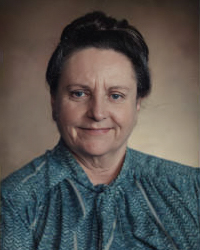
Dorothy Jelicich

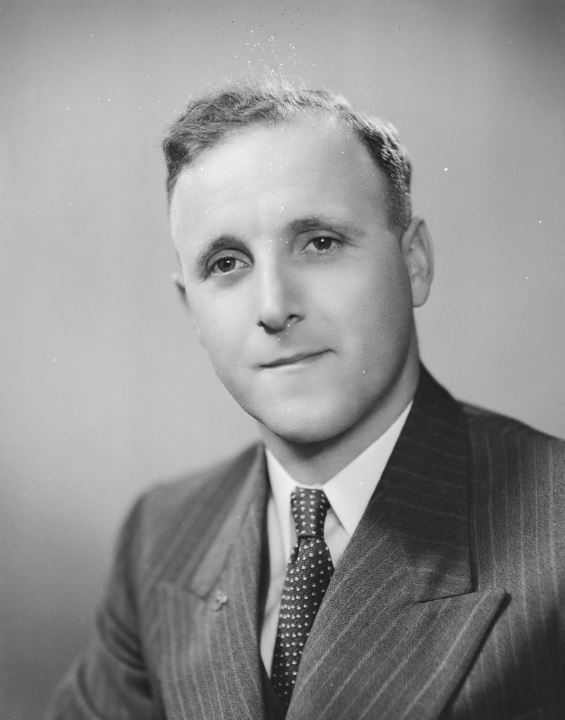
Tom McGuigan

== Queen's Service Medal (QSM) ==
=== For community service ===
- Violet Victoria Bishop – of Eastbourne.
- Irene Jessie Blenkinsop – of Christchurch.
- Donovan Francis Bowles – of Hamilton.
- Corinne Shirley Bridge (Mrs Raymon Opie) – of Auckland.
- Yvette Bromley – of Christchurch.
- Dan Chan – of Wellington.
- Lois Marguerite Cox – of Auckland.
- Coloman de Bolgar – of Christchurch.
- Jean Barbara Dunford – of Raumati Beach.
- Vivian Lauder Gregory – of Kaitaia.
- Ethel Gwendoline Hallett – of Auckland.
- Walter Clement Harris – of Christchurch.
- Graham Michael Lowe – of Auckland.
- Sue McCauley (Susan Montgomery Hammond) – of Ōkaihau.
- Te Kohi (Sonny) McLaughlin – of Auckland.
- Trudie Elizabeth McNaughton – of Auckland.
- Mary Maud Elizabeth Mawson – of Nelson.
- Melva Joan Mildenhall – of Hastings.
- Molly Stanley Murchie – of Wanganui.
- Jelal Kalyanji Natali – of Auckland.
- Raymond Fergus Opie (Raymon Opie) – of Auckland.
- Arekaahanara Alexander Phillips – of Taumarunui.
- Thelma Pitt-Turner – of Palmerston North.
- Thomas John Ray Quinney JP – of Nelson.
- Kathleen Elsie Lenore Rose – of Timaru.
- Robert Paton Smithson – of Dunedin.
- Diana Standen – of Wellington.
- James Nelson Steedman – of Dunedin.
- Rangitaamo Takarangi – of Wanganui.
- Eric Alan Voyce – of Christchurch.
- Annabelle Woodhouse – of Auckland.
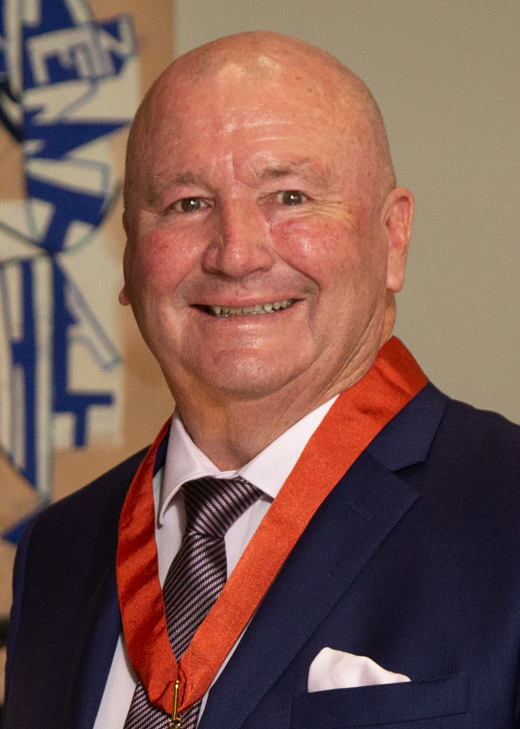
Graham Lowe

=== For public services ===
- John Benjamin Andersen JP – of Christchurch.
- Robert James Arnold Badland – of Silverstream.
- Claude Thomas Bathe – of Whakatāne.
- Arthur David Bolton – of Waiheke Island.
- John Bracken JP – of Auckland.
- James Bratty – senior constable, New Zealand Police.
- John Cataldo – of Wellington.
- Marion Dorothy Cooper – of Lower Hutt.
- Elizabeth Timua Crofts – of Christchurch.
- Lawrence Charles Duckworth – of Blenheim.
- Peter Douglas Dunbar JP – of Christchurch.
- David Wayne Gadsby – of Wanganui; fireman, Wanganui Fire Brigade, New Zealand Fire Service.
- Janette May Gerritsen – of Hamilton.
- Otto Groen – of Auckland.
- Leslie John Hall – of Wellington.
- Susan Louise Ineson – of Wellington.
- Dawn Patricia Jameson – of Auckland.
- Aporo Julian Joyce – senior constable, New Zealand Police.
- Joan Mavis Knox JP – of Upper Hutt.
- Elaine Ursula McCulloch – of Auckland.
- James Horton McKinnon – of Rotorua.
- Walter Joseph McNabb – of Kumara.
- Geoffrey Gillard Newson – of Wellington.
- Thomas Francis O'Brien – of Richmond.
- Victor Frederick Percival JP – of Auckland.
- Tiopira Te Kiriwai Pohatu JP – of Waiouru.
- Bernice Elizabeth Shackleton – of Waimate.
- Simose Sipeli – of Niue; member of Niue Legislative Assembly.
- Dougal Earle Harris Soper – of Invercargill.
- Talaiti (Mr) – of Niue; member of Niue Legislative Assembly.
- Elizabeth Wark – of Auckland.
- Reginald Henry James Watson – of Oamaru.

== Queen's Fire Services Medal (QFSM) ==
- Ernest James Muir – chief fire officer, Balclutha Volunteer Fire Brigade, New Zealand Fire Service.
- Lyndsay Neill Price – station officer, Christchurch Fire Brigade, New Zealand Fire Service.
- Trevor George Richard Tricklebank – chief fire officer, Feilding Volunteer Fire Brigade, New Zealand Fire Service.
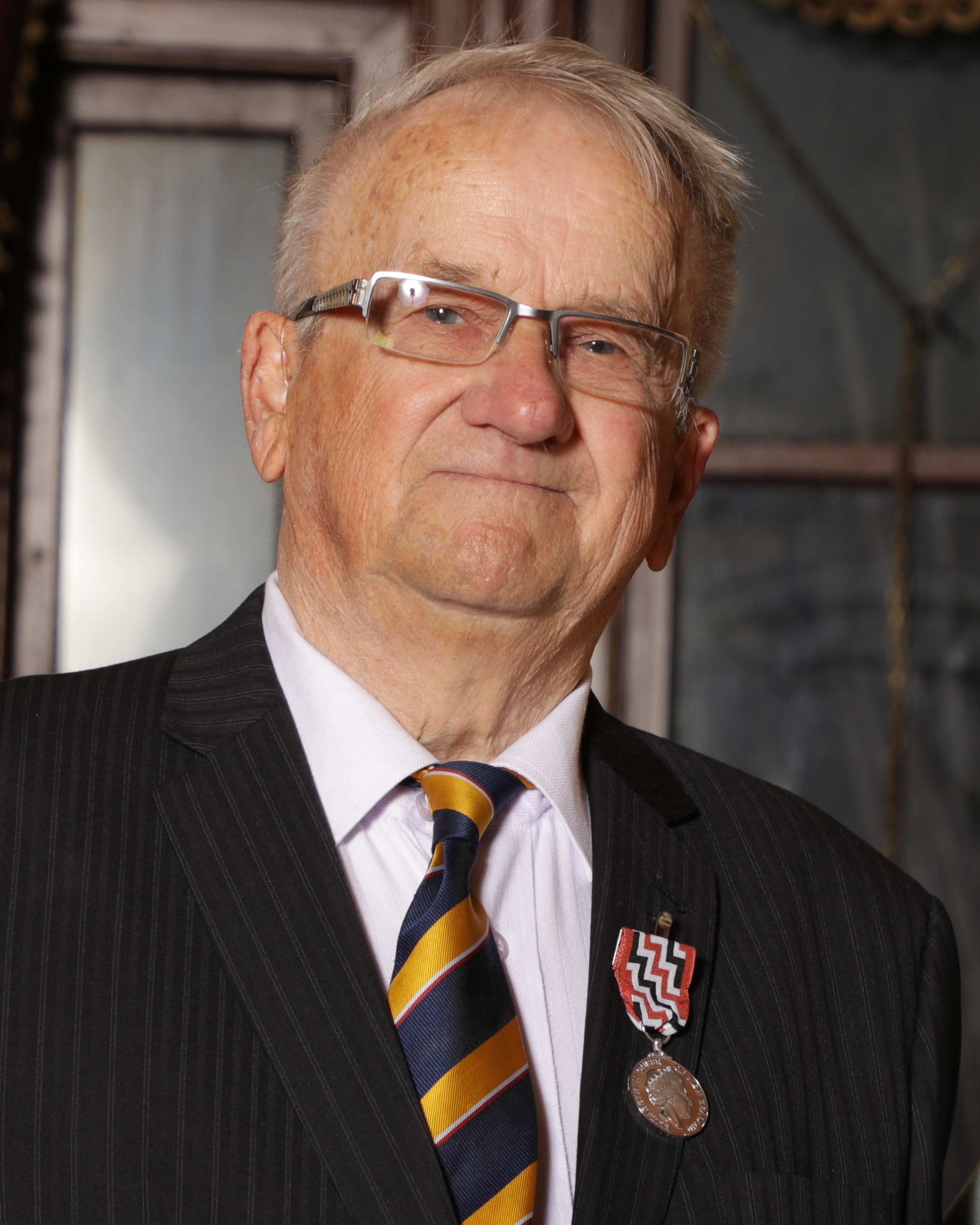
Neill Price

== Queen's Police Medal (QPM) ==
- Gilbert Cooke Hill – superintendent, New Zealand Police.

== Queen's Commendation for Valuable Service in the Air ==
- Flight Lieutenant David John Watson – Royal New Zealand Air Force.
