= Tony Browne (diplomat) =

New Zealand diplomat

High Commissioner for New Zealand to Vanuatu
- In office 1987–1990
- Preceded by: Alison Pearce
- Succeeded by: Caroline Forsyth

Ambassador of New Zealand to China
- In office 2004–2009
- Preceded by: John McKinnon
- Succeeded by: Carl Robinson Worker

Personal details
- Born: Anthony Patrick Francis Browne; 16 March 1948 (age 78) Nelson, New Zealand
- Education: Christchurch Boys' High School
- Alma mater: University of Canterbury

Anthony Patrick Francis Browne (born 16 March 1948) is a retired New Zealand diplomat.

- In 1966 Tony Browne was in the first group of Volunteer Service Abroad to go to the then New Hebrides.
- He graduated MA (1st class Hons in History from the University of Canterbury
- In 1973 he entered the Ministry of Foreign Affairs and Trade (New Zealand) and began language training that year in Hong Kong. He was posted to Beijing from 1976 to 1978.
- From 1983 to 1985 he was Official Secretary in the Office for Tokelau Affairs, based in Apia. In 1980 he helped in Vanuatu to set up its Ministry of Foreign Affairs and External Trade.
- From 1985 to 1987 he was on the staff of the New Zealand Mission to the United Nations Headquarters in New York City.
- From 1987 to 1990 he was the first resident High Commissioner to Vanuatu.
- In 1990, Browne was awarded the New Zealand 1990 Commemoration Medal.
- From 1990 to 1994 was Director of the Domestic and External Security Secretariat in the Department of the Prime Minister and Cabinet.
- From 1994 to 1997 was Director of the New Zealand Commerce and Industry Office in Taipei.
- From 1998 to 2000 he was the Chief of Protocol then from 2000 to 2004 was Director of the North Asia Division of the Ministry of Foreign Affairs and Trade.
- From 2004 to 2009 he was ambassador in Beijing.
- From 2010 to his retirement in 2011 he was Deputy Secretary of Foreign Affairs and Trade.
- In 2011 he was appointed as Chair of the New Zealand Contemporary China Research Centre, and also assumed the position of Chair of the Victoria University of Wellington Confucius Institute.
- He was appointed to the executive board of the New Zealand China Council when the council was established in 2012.
- He is a Senior Consultant to Hanban, the Confucius Institute Headquarters in Beijing.
- He is Deputy Chair of New Zealand Chinese Language Week.
- He is New Zealand Director of the China Advanced Leadership Program for ANZSOG (Australia and New Zealand School of Government).
