= Peter Adams (Australian footballer) =

Australian rules footballer

Personal information
- Born: 20 June 1964 (age 62)
- Original team: Ivanhoe Amateurs
- Height: 178 cm (5 ft 10 in)
- Weight: 76 kg (168 lb)

Playing career^{1}
Years	Club	Games (Goals)
1986–1987	Collingwood	6 (9)
- ^{1} Playing statistics correct to the end of 1987.

Peter Adams (born 20 June 1964) is a former Australian rules footballer who played with Collingwood in the Victorian Football League (VFL).

Adams, a rover, came to Collingwood from Ivanhoe Amateurs in 1986. He made his debut that year in Collingwood's round 21 win over Richmond, as a replacement for an injured Tony Shaw. He also played the following week, against St Kilda at Waverley Park, where he had 19 disposals and kicked four goals. Collingwood missed out on a spot in the finals by percentage.

In 1986 he also represented the VAFA at the Adelaide AAFC Carnival, which they won.

He made four appearances for Collingwood in 1987.
