= Christopher Elder =

New Zealand diplomat

Christopher John Elder

Ambassador of New Zealand to China
- In office 1993–1998
- Preceded by: Michael Powles
- Succeeded by: Peter Adams (diplomat)

Ambassador of New Zealand to Indonesia
- In office August 29, 2001 – 2006
- Preceded by: Michael Green (diplomat)
- Succeeded by: Phillip Gibson

Ambassador of New Zealand to Russian Federation
- In office 2006 – August 19, 2009 October 12, 2009
- Preceded by: Stuart Prior
- Succeeded by: Ian Hill

Chargé d'affaires of New Zealand to Germany
- In office 2006–2009
- Preceded by: Peter Hamilton
- Succeeded by: Peter Hamilton

Personal details
- Born: 1947 (age 78–79)

Christopher Elder is a retired diplomat of New Zealand.

- Until 1973 Chris Elder was trained as a Chinese linguist.
- From 1973 to 1975 he was employed in the New Zealand Embassy in Beijing when it was opened.
- From 1993 to 1997 he was ambassador in Beijing.
- From 2001 to 2006 he was New Zealand's longest-serving ambassador in Jakarta.
- From 2006 to August 7, 2009 he was ambassador in the Embassy of New Zealand in Moscow (Russian Federation).
- In Wellington, Chris has served as the Deputy Secretary with responsibility for Asian affairs and security policy in the Asia-Pacific region.
- From August 7, 2009 to 2012 he was Chargé d'affaires in Berlin.
- Despite his expertise in China/New Zealand relations, Chris did not serve again in Beijing.
- In 2012 he retired from the Ministry of Foreign Affairs and Trade (New Zealand).
- He has published a range of papers and articles relating to New Zealand's interaction with China and with Asia.
- With Michael Green, he co-authored a historical survey of New Zealand-China relations (New Zealand and China 1792-1972) and with Robert Ayson a Centre for Strategic Studies Discussion Paper, China's Rise and New Zealand's Interests: A Policy Primer for 2030.

== Publications ==
- Old Peking: City of the Ruler of the World, Oxford University Press, 1997
- China's Treaty Ports: Half Love and Half Hate, Oxford University Press, 1999
- New Zealand's China Experience: Its Genesis, Triumphs, and Occasional Moments of less than Complete Success, Victoria University Press, 2012
- Forty Years On: New Zealand-China Relations then, now and in the Years to Come, Victoria University Press, 2013
