= Lindsay Watt =

New Zealand diplomat

High Commissioner of New Zealand to the Cook Islands
- In office 16 February 1980 – 17 March 1982
- Preceded by: Brian Absolum
- Succeeded by: Paul Tipping

High Commissioner of New Zealand to Fiji
- In office 1982–1985
- Preceded by: Michael Powles
- Succeeded by: Rod Gates

Ambassador of New Zealand to China
- In office 1985–1990
- Preceded by: Tony Small
- Succeeded by: Michael Powles

Administrator of Tokelau
- In office 1993–2003
- Preceded by: Brian Absolum
- Succeeded by: Neil Walter

Personal details
- Born: Lindsay Johnstone Watt; 1934 (age 91–92) Lincoln, New Zealand
- Spouse: Priscilla Pirie Cabot Morrison (died 1987)
- Occupation: Public servant; diplomat

Lindsay Johnstone Watt (born 1934) is a retired New Zealand diplomat. His roles include being New Zealand ambassador to China from 1985 to 1990, and the administrator of Tokelau for 10 years from 1993.

== Early life and family ==
Watt was born at Lincoln in 1934, the son of Dorothy Watt (née Laishley) and George James Watt. At the time, his father was a member of the farmer staff at Canterbury Agricultural College, and later served as the commissioner of Crown lands, Christchurch.

From 1948 to 1951, Watt was educated St. Andrew's College, Christchurch. He went on the study at Victoria University College, graduating with a Master of Arts degree with second-class honours in 1957. He married Priscilla Pirie Cabot Morrison; she died in 1987.

== Career ==
From 1960 to 1963, Watt was third secretary at the mission of New Zealand to the Headquarters of the United Nations in New York City. In 1969, he was first secretary of the new Zealand embassy in Bangkok. In 1976, he was counsellor at the High Commission of New Zealand, London.

From 16 February 1980 to 17 March 1982, Watt was the representative of New Zealand to the Cook Islands. From 1982 to 1985, he was the high commissioner of New Zealand to Fiji, based in Suva. From 1985 to 1990 he was New Zealand's ambassador in Beijing. In late 1985, Watt became the first foreign ambassador to visit Guizhou province in southwest China, and met Hu Jintao, at that time the provincial governor, who would later serve as the president of China from 2003 to 2013. Watt observed that Hu was a potential future leader, later writing of him:

He was exceptionally well-briefed on New Zealand's involvement, very focused on taking practical steps to alleviate poverty and improve food supplies taking account of the minority nationality situation, and very interested in what New Zealand was doing and in the prospects for example for grassland development. I felt — noting too the attitude in his presence of other Chinese officials — that there was an aura surrounding Hu Jintao.

After completing his posting in Beijing, Watt expressed his thinking about the future of the relationship between New Zealand and China in the book New Zealand and China towards 2000, published in 1992. In the book, Watt predicted that China would become New Zealand's largest export market by the early 21st century.

From 1993 to 2003, Watt was the administrator of Tokelau, based in Wellington, and was the first administrator to serve in a full-time capacity. During Watt's tenure, negotiations between the New Zealand government and Tokelauan customary leaders took place to develop a new constitution for Tokelau as a self-governing nation. This ultimately led to the self-determination referendums of 2006 and 2007, which rejected changing Tokelau's status from an unincorporated New Zealand territory to a self-governing state in free association with New Zealand.
