= Caroline McDonald =

New Zealand diplomat

Caroline McDonald was New Zealand's Acting High Commissioner to Fiji who was expelled in December 2008 by the interim military Government in Suva "after she was accused of acting inappropriately and not cooperating with the Fiji Administration".

McDonald was also High Commissioner to India from 2001 until 2004 and Vanuatu from 1996 to 1999.
