= Index of Tokelau-related articles =

The following is an alphabetical list of articles related to Tokelau.

== A ==
- Administrator of Tokelau
- Ahua
- Apia, Tokelau
- Atafu
- Avakilikili
- Awtano

== B ==
- Badge of Tokelau

== D ==
- David Payton
- Duncan MacIntyre (New Zealand politician)

== E ==
- Education in Tokelau

== F ==
- Fakaofo
- Fale, Tokelau
- Falima Teao
- Fatigauhu
- Fenua Fala
- Fenua Loa
- Flag of Tokelau
- Foua Toloa

== G ==
- Guy Powles

== H ==
- Health care in Tokelau
- Hemoana Stadium

== I ==
- Internet in Tokelau
- ISO 3166-2:TK

== J ==
- Jonathan Kings
- John Allen (diplomat)

== K ==
- Kerisiano Kalolo
- Kolouei O'Brien
- Kuresa Nasau

== L ==
- Lalo, Tokelau
- Languages of Tokelau
- Laulauia
- List of birds of Tokelau
- List of butterflies of Tokelau
- List of heads of government of Tokelau
- List of mammals of Tokelau
- List of newspapers in Tokelau
- List of villages in Tokelau
- Literacy in Tokelau
- Loimata Iupati
- Luana Liki Hotel

== M ==
- Matangi, Tokelau
- Motu Akea
- Motufala
- Motuhaga
- Mulifenua
- Music of Tokelau

== N ==
- Neil Walter
- Niututahi
- Nukulakia
- Nukumatau
- Nukunonu

== P ==
- Patuki Isaako
- Peniuto Semisi
- Pio Tuia
- Public holidays in Tokelau
- Punalei

== R ==
- Religion in Tokelau
- Roman Catholic Mission Sui Iuris of Tokelau
- Russell Marshall

== S ==
- Salesio Lui
- Saumagalu
- Saumatafanga
- Smoking in Tokelau

== T ==
- Taulagapapa
- Te Fakanava
- Te Kamu
- Te Puka e Mua
- Te Puku
- Te Vaka
- Te Vakai
- Teafua
- Telephone numbers in Tokelau
- Television in Tokelau
- Tinielu Tuumuli
- .tk
- Tokelau
- Tokelau (islet)
- Tokelau Scholarship Scheme
- Tokelauan language
- Tokelauan people
- Treaty of Tokehega
- Tui Tokelau

== See also ==
- Lists of country-related topics
- Outline of Tokelau
