= Outline of Tokelau =

Overview of and topical guide to Tokelau

The Flag of Tokelau

The Badge of Tokelau

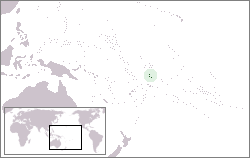
The location of Tokelau

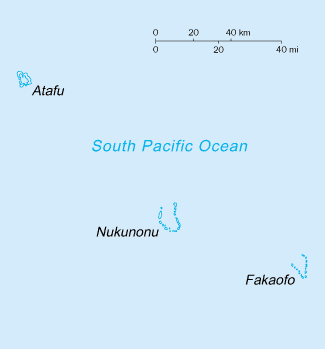
An enlargeable map of Tokelau

The following outline is provided as an overview of and topical guide to Tokelau:

Tokelau is a territory of New Zealand comprising three tropical coral atolls in the South Pacific Ocean. The United Nations General Assembly includes Tokelau on the United Nations list of non-self-governing territories.

Until 1976 the official name was Tokelau Islands. Tokelau is sometimes referred to by Westerners by the older, colonial name of The Union Islands.

== General reference ==
- Pronunciation:
- Common English country name: Tokelau (formerly Tokelau Islands)
- Official English country name: The New Zealand Territory of Tokelau
- Common endonym(s): Tokelau
- Official endonym(s):
- Adjectival(s): Tokelauan
- Demonym(s): Tokelauans
- Etymology: Name of Tokelau
- ISO country codes: TK, TKL, 772
- ISO region codes: See ISO 3166-2:TK
- Internet country code top-level domain: .tk

== Geography of Tokelau ==
Geography of Tokelau

- Tokelau is: an overseas territory of New Zealand
- Location:
  - Southern Hemisphere and Western Hemisphere
  - Pacific Ocean
    - South Pacific Ocean
      - Oceania
        - Polynesia
  - Time zone: UTC+13
  - Extreme points of Tokelau
    - High: unnamed location 5 m (16 ft)
    - Low: South Pacific Ocean 0 m
  - Land boundaries: none
  - Coastline: South Pacific Ocean 101 km
- Population of Tokelau: 2,608 - 194th most populous country
- Area of Tokelau: 10 km^{2}
- Atlas of Tokelau

=== Environment of Tokelau ===
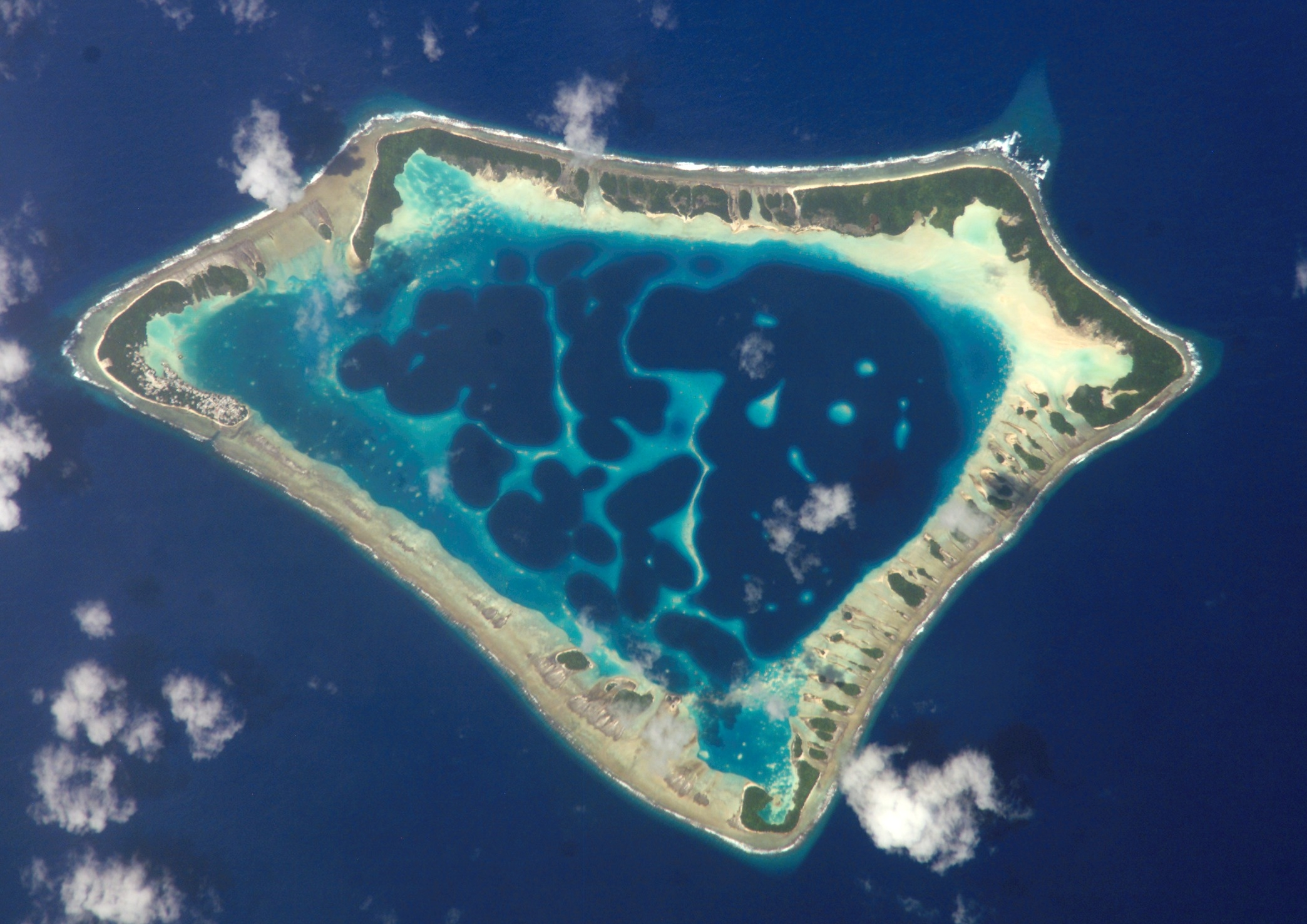
An enlargeable satellite image of Atafu Atoll in Tokelau

- Climate of Tokelau
- Renewable energy in Tokelau
- Geology of Tokelau
- Protected areas of Tokelau
  - Biosphere reserves in Tokelau
- Wildlife of Tokelau
  - Fauna of Tokelau
    - Birds of Tokelau
    - Butterflies of Tokelau
    - Mammals of Tokelau

==== Natural geographic features of Tokelau ====
- The three atolls of Tokelau
  - Atafu
  - Fakaofo
  - Nukunonu
- Islands of Tokelau
- World Heritage Sites in Tokelau: None

=== Populated places of Tokelau ===
- List of villages in Tokelau

=== Demography of Tokelau ===
Demographics of Tokelau

== Government and politics of Tokelau ==
Politics of Tokelau

- Form of government: parliamentary representative democratic dependency
- Capital of Tokelau: None, each atoll has its own administrative center
- Elections in Tokelau
- There are no political parties in Tokelau.

=== Branches of the government of Tokelau ===
==== Executive branch of the government of Tokelau ====
- Head of state (ceremonial): King of New Zealand, King Charles III
- Head of government: Ulu-o-Tokelau, Aliki Faipule Alapati Tavite
- Cabinet: Council for the Ongoing Government of Tokelau

==== Legislative branch of the government of Tokelau ====
- General Fono

==== Judicial branch of the government of Tokelau ====
- Judiciary of Tokelau

=== Foreign relations of Tokelau ===
Foreign relations of Tokelau

- Diplomatic missions in Tokelau
- Diplomatic missions of Tokelau

==== International organization membership ====
Tokelau is a member of:

- The Pacific Community (SPC)
- Pacific Islands Forum (PIF) (observer)
- United Nations Educational, Scientific, and Cultural Organization (UNESCO) (associate)
- Universal Postal Union (UPU)

=== Law and order in Tokelau ===
Law of Tokelau

- Constitution of Tokelau
- Crime in Tokelau
- Human rights in Tokelau
  - LGBT rights in Tokelau
  - Freedom of religion in Tokelau
- Law enforcement in Tokelau

=== Local government in Tokelau ===
Local government in Tokelau

== History of Tokelau ==
History of Tokelau

- Timeline of the history of Tokelau
- Constitutional history of Tokelau
- Military history of Tokelau

== Culture of Tokelau ==
Culture of Tokelau

- Architecture of Tokelau
- Cuisine of Tokelau
- Festivals in Tokelau
- Languages of Tokelau
  - Tokelauan language
- Media in Tokelau
  - Newspapers in Tokelau
- National symbols of Tokelau
  - Coat of arms of Tokelau
  - Flag of Tokelau
  - National anthem of Tokelau
- People of Tokelau
- Public holidays in Tokelau
- Records of Tokelau
- Religion in Tokelau
  - Tui Tokelau, a god worshipped in Tokelau
- World Heritage Sites in Tokelau: None

=== Art in Tokelau ===
- Art in Tokelau
- Literature of Tokelau
- Music of Tokelau
- Television in Tokelau
- Theatre in Tokelau

=== Sports in Tokelau ===
- Rugby league in Tokelau
- Rugby union in Tokelau

== Economy and infrastructure of Tokelau ==
Economy of Tokelau

- Economic rank, by nominal GDP (2007):
- Agriculture in Tokelau
- Banking in Tokelau
- Communications in Tokelau
  - Internet in Tokelau
- Companies of Tokelau
- Currency of Tokelau: Dollar
  - ISO 4217: NZD
- Energy in Tokelau
  - Energy policy of Tokelau
- Health care in Tokelau
- Tourism in Tokelau
  - Luana Liki Hotel
- Transport in Tokelau
- Water supply and sanitation in Tokelau

== Education in Tokelau ==
Education in Tokelau

- Literacy in Tokelau

== See also ==
- Index of Tokelau-related articles
- List of international rankings
- Outline of geography
- Outline of New Zealand
- Outline of Oceania
