= Education in Tokelau =

There are three schools in the whole of Tokelau. Each school is located on each of the three atolls. Tialeniu School is on the atoll of Fakaofo, the most southern of the three islands. Matiti School is on Nukunonu, while Matauala School is on the island of Atafu (the northernmost island of the three).

The schools have levels or classes running from Early Childhood Education (ECE) right through to Year 11. At Year 11, students are required to sit for a national examination. This examination is used to determine which students will continue Year 12 studies under the Tokelau Scholarship Scheme. The successful students commence Year 12 and 13 studies in Samoa.

Schools are under the administration of the Taupulega's village council. The Education Department plays a supporting role in providing training and workshops for principals and teachers, assisting in other developments with the schools, including the setting and marking of the Year 11 National Examinations.

== TVET ==
Technical and Vocational Education and Training (TVET) is still within its planning stages in Tokelau. With the high push out and drop out rate evident in Tokelau, the department has found the need and urgency to provide opportunities and alternative pathways for the learner to explore. The main focus of the TVET Programme will focus on two main target areas. Firstly, is the school based system, running courses and programmes parallel to the academic programmes from Year 9 to Year 13. The second target group is within the community based programmes. The main community groups in Tokelau are the Taupulega (village council), aumaga (men's group), the fatupaepae (women's group) and various groups within the church.

Programmes and courses relevant to the needs of the Tokelau people and community are being developed. It is the hope that TVET will not only provide another pathway for students and individuals in schools and the community, but also assist in the social and economic development of the country.

== See also ==
- Literacy in Tokelau

This article contains content derived from WikiEducator's article on Tokelau, which is licensed under the Creative Commons Attribution-Sharealike 3.0.
