= Semisi =

Semisi is a given name and surname. Notable people with the name include:

- Semisi Fakahau (1948−2022), Tongan politician
- Semisi Fonua (1911–1968), Tongan noble
- Semisi Masirewa (born 1992), Fijian rugby union player
- Semisi Naevo (born 1975), Fijian rugby union player
- Semisi Paea (born 1999), Tongan rugby union player
- Semisi Sika (born 1968), Tongan politician
- Semisi Tapueluelu (born 1949), Tongan politician
- Semisi Taulava (born 1983), Tongan rugby union player
- Semisi Telefoni (born 1982), New Zealand-born Tongan rugby union player
- Semisi Tora (born 1979), Fijian rugby league player
- Semisi Tupou (born 1999), Australian rugby union player
- Peniuto Semisi (fl. 1990), Tokelauan politician
