= Te Ulugā Talafau =

Tokelauan English-language newsletter

- Founded: July 2018
- Language: English
- Country: Tokelau

Te Ulugā Talafau te uluŋaː talafau is a Tokelauan monthly newspaper. It was first published in Nukunonu in July 2018.

== History ==
Until 2018, Tokelau had an official newspaper, but it was sporadic; moreover, very few news items on Tokelau were written by Tokelauans. In 2018, new newspapers were created in two atolls; Nukunonu was served by Te Ulugā Talafau. At launch, the atoll's Taupulega received an NZ$12,000 investment.

This became the first newspaper to be compiled in an individual atoll. Hefo Tuia was its founding editor. Its name is derived from the fact that the Taupulega is its owner.
