= LGBTQ rights in Tokelau =

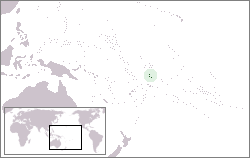
- Tokelau
- Legal status: Male legal since 2003, female always legal
- Gender identity: No
- Military: New Zealand's responsibility
- Discrimination protections: No

Family rights
- Recognition of relationships: No
- Adoption: No

Lesbian, gay, bisexual, and transgender (LGBT) people in Tokelau face legal challenges not experienced by non-LGBTQ residents. Both the male and female kinds of same-sex sexual activity are legal in Tokelau, but same-sex couples and households headed by same-sex couples are not eligible for the same legal protections available to opposite-sex married couples.

== History ==
Tokelau, similarly to Samoa, the Cook Islands, New Zealand, Niue and other Polynesian states, possesses a traditional and cultural third gender population. Such individuals are known in Tokelauan as the fakafāfine. Fakafāfine are assigned male at birth but dress, act and behave as female. People living as this gender role have traditionally been accepted by Tokelauan society.

== Law regarding same-sex sexual activity ==
Same-sex sexual activity has been legal in Tokelau since 2003 by the Crimes, Procedure and Evidence Rules 2003. Before that, male homosexual activity was illegal under sections 170 and 171 of Niue Act 1966 as extended to Tokelau by the Tokelau Islands Crimes Regulations 1975.

== Recognition of same-sex relationships ==
Same-sex unions are not recognized (even though they are in New Zealand). Tokelau law does not explicitly prohibit same-sex marriage, but generally assumes the parties to be male and female. The Constitution of Tokelau states the following:

- in English: The family is the basis of the nation, and the positive approach we use for the raising of our families shall be the basis for making national decisions.
- in Tokelauan: Ko te kāiga, ko te fatu ia o to matou atunuku, ma ko nā faiga gali e atiake ai o matou kāiga, e fakaaogā e kimatou kē fatu ai nā faigātonu a te atunuku.

== Living conditions ==
Much like the rest of Polynesia, open displays of affection between partners regardless of sexual orientation may offend.

== Summary table ==
Same-sex sexual activity legal	Yes (Since 2003)
Equal age of consent	Yes (Since 2003)
Anti-discrimination laws in employment only	No
Anti-discrimination laws in the provision of goods and services	No
Anti-discrimination laws in all other areas (Incl. indirect discrimination, hate speech)	No
Same-sex marriages	No
Recognition of same-sex couples	No
Stepchild adoption by same-sex couples	No
Joint adoption by same-sex couples	No
LGBT people allowed to serve openly in the military	Yes (New Zealand's responsibility)
Right to change legal gender	No
Access to IVF for lesbians	No
Commercial surrogacy for gay male couples	No
MSMs allowed to donate blood	No

== See also ==
- Human rights in Tokelau
- LGBTQ rights in New Zealand
- LGBTQ rights in Oceania
