= Judiciary of Tokelau =

The Judiciary of Tokelau formally consists of the Commissioner’s Court and Appeal Committee of each village, the High Court and the Court of Appeal.

In practice, however, no dispute from Tokelau has ever been litigated outside Tokelau. There has been a strong community feeling that disputes are matters for the community and the community alone. This has meant that, to date, community thinking has been opposed to any thought of having a case decided in another village, let alone outside Tokelau.

== Jurisdiction ==
=== Village Councils ===
Village Councils have civil and criminal jurisdiction for matters within their island and territorial sea and consist of a Commissioner and a Court Clerk. Councils may only hear civil claims up to $1000 and criminal cases punishable by a fine or imprisonment for a period of at most one year. Despite this, the maximum term of imprisonment which a Commissioner can impose is three months, and the maximum fine that can be imposed is $150. Other penalties which can be imposed include community service, reprimand, police supervision and compensation for loss of property.

=== Appeal Committee ===
The Appeal Committees of each island comprise a maximum of three members and have the jurisdiction to hear appeals of decisions made by the Village Councils.

=== Higher courts ===
Major criminal or civil matters, as well as appeals, can be dealt with by the High Court of New Zealand acting as the High Court of Tokelau, followed by the Court of Appeal of New Zealand, acting as the Court of Appeal of Tokelau. In addition, despite having been abolished in other Commonwealth nations such as Australia and New Zealand, the right of appeal to the Privy Council still theoretically exists for Tokelauan disputes.

== Practical operation ==
Currently, the judges of Tokelau are the Law Commissioners of each island. These are lay officers who perform their duties with the village councils in the context of the village structures and local tradition. In the fulfilment of their roles, Commissioners typically are informed more by custom than legislation, although, the Crimes, Procedure and Evidence Rules 2003 have, where possible, incorporated these customs. The Commissioners are concerned primarily with criminal offences of a minor nature and, in cooperation with the local police officers, deal with offenders by way of reprimand, sentences of community service or fines. There are no prisons in Tokelau, but when someone is sentenced to imprisonment for a minor crime, they are required to help police in their duties.

=== Legal representation ===
The requirement of the availability of defence counsel, at public cost if necessary, presents practical problems for a community of Tokelau’s type, given its small population and physical isolation. However, there is provision in Rule 94 of the Crimes, Procedure and Evidence Rules for the grant of legal aid, taking into account the means of the applicant and the nature of the case. Under Rule 95 of the Crimes, Procedure and Evidence Rules the prior written approval of the Council for Ongoing Government is required in order to be able to practise law in Tokelau or before a court of Tokelau. To date, three New Zealand qualified lawyers have been admitted to practice in the courts of Tokelau. Two of those are in the Government service and one in the private sector.

=== Civil cases and appeals ===
There is no fee for filing civil cases in Tokelau, however such cases are uncommon. In the 2011-2012 and 2012-2013 Tokelau Judicial Annual Reports, it was reported that no civil cases were filed.

Appeals to the Appeal Committee are also uncommon, with the 2011-2012 and 2012-2013 Tokelau Judicial Annual Reports both reporting that no appeals were made.

== See also ==
- Human rights in Tokelau

This article contains content originally derived from "United Nations International Covenant on Civil and Political Rights: New Zealand draft periodic report 6", produced by the New Zealand Ministry of Justice, which is licensed under the Creative Commons Attribution 3.0 New Zealand License.
