= Motufala =

Coordinates: 9.2203°S 171.7730°W

Motufala is an islet of the Nukunonu island group of Tokelau.
