= List of newspapers in Tokelau =

This is a list of newspapers in Tokelau.

- Te Vakai
- Te Ulugā Talafau
- Te Moa Moa
