= Badge of Tokelau =

National badge

Versions
- Badge of the General Fono of Tokelau
- Armiger: Charles III in Right of New Zealand
- Adopted: 2008
- Shield: On a Tuluma proper, a cross argent
- Motto: Tokelau mo te Atua (Tokelauan, "Tokelau for God")

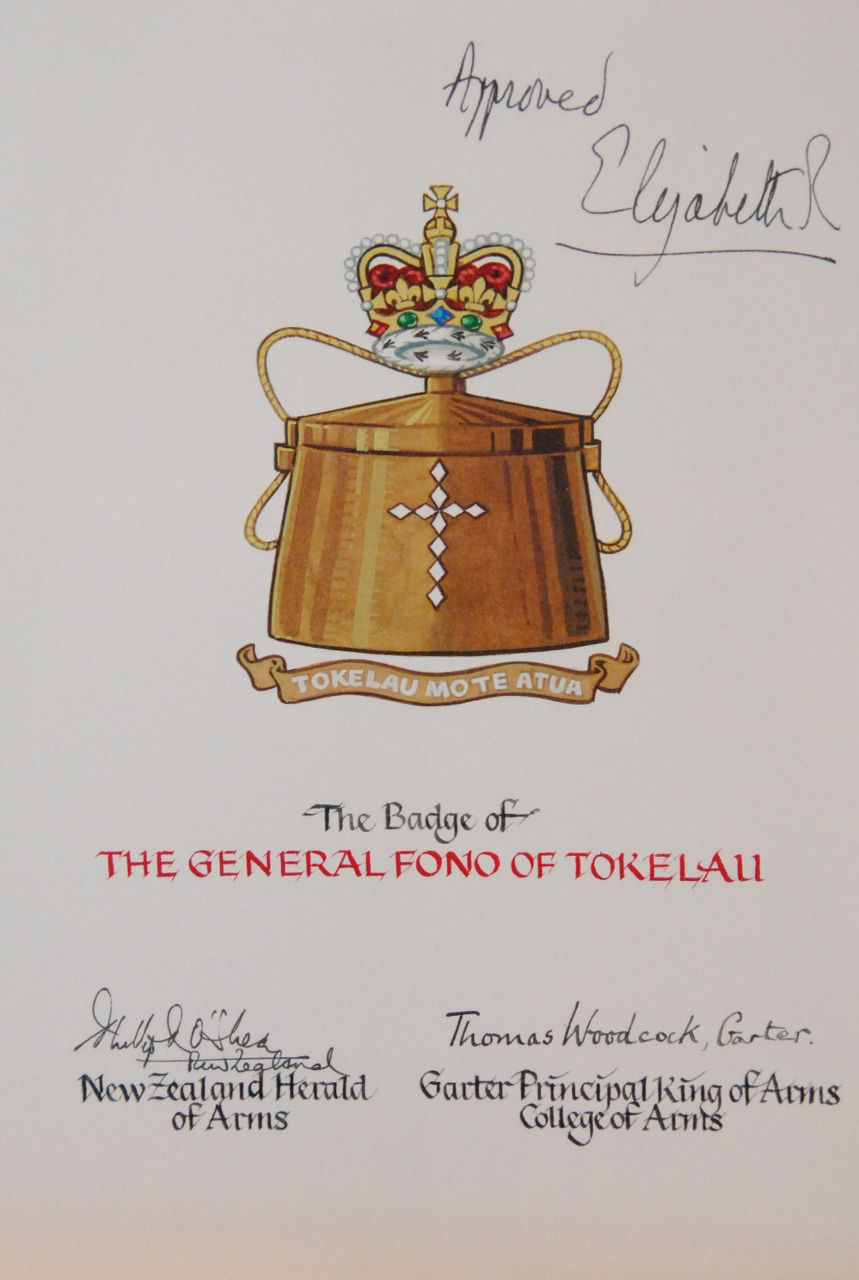
The Badge of the General Fono as approved by Queen Elizabeth II, Queen of the Realm of New Zealand

The national badge of Tokelau depicts a tuluma, which is a traditional Tokelauan carved wooden “tackle box” used by local fishermen. A white cross in the centre of the tuluma and the inscription below Tokelau mo te Atua (Tokelauan, "Tokelau for God") reflect the strong influence of Christianity in Tokelau.

Tokelau's parliament, the General Fono, uses an identical design surmounted by St Edward's Crown.

== History ==
In 2003, Tokelau took the steps of arranging for a new unique symbol and flag for the territory. The General Fono approved a design for a national emblem in May 2008. Prior to 2008, the coat of arms of New Zealand and the flag of New Zealand were used. A new flag was also adopted at the same time.

The badge of the General Fono of Tokelau is the national emblem with the Royal Crown. It was approved by Garter Principal King of Arms and Queen Elizabeth II, the Queen of New Zealand. It was presented to the Ulu-o-Tokelau, Aliki Faipule Salesio Lui, on 7 October 2013 by the Governor-General Sir Jerry Mateparae. The Governor-General stated he hoped it would strengthen ties between New Zealand and Tokelau. In 2023, following the death of Queen Elizabeth II, no official profile for her successor King Charles III had been approved in time. Accordingly, the badge of Tokelau was printed on 2023 Tokelauan coins in lieu of any Monarchical portrait.

== Blazon ==
The heraldic blazon for the badge of the General Fono of Tokelau is given as:

“A representation of a Tuluma or carved wooden Fishing Tackle Box proper charged with ten Lozenges conjoined in cross six palewise in pale and four fesswise in fess Argent the whole ensigned by a Royal Crown proper. Below on a scroll “Tokelau mo te Atua.””

== See also ==
- Flag of Tokelau
- Te Atua o Tokelau
