= Constitutional history of Tokelau =

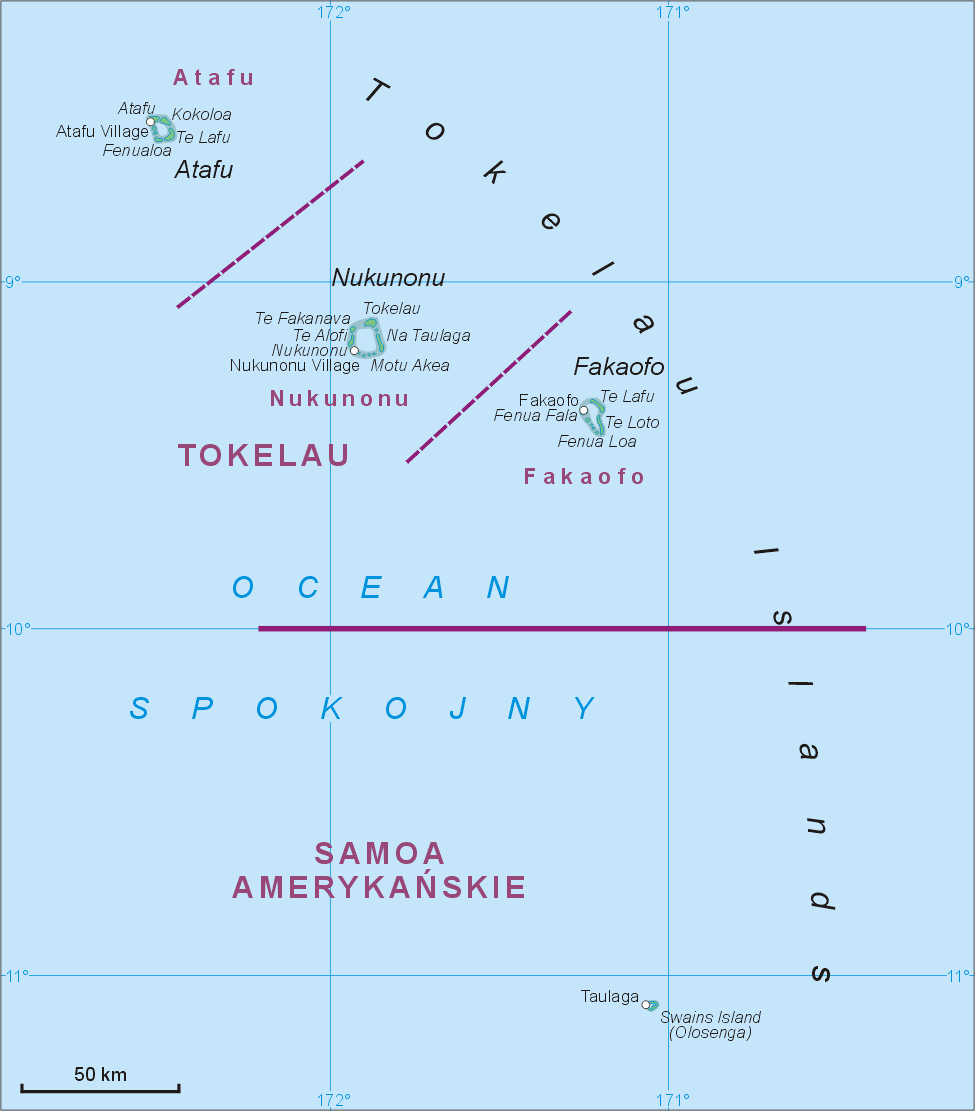

The constitutional history of Tokelau comprises several acts and amendments. Tokelau comprises the three Pacific atolls of Atafu, Nukunonu, and Fakaofo. The constitutional history of the atoll group dates to its earliest human settlement of at least 1,000 years, much of this time involved an unwritten and oral tradition. It has been governed by many written acts and rules of governance since 1887. The history of Tokelau's laws has been recorded in Tokelau Subdelegated Legislation 1877–1948 and is also published by the Tokelau Law Project.

== British Protectorate and Colony (1889–1926) ==
British subjects in Tokelau (then known as the Union Islands) were brought under the jurisdiction of the Western Pacific High Commission by an order-in-council in 1877.

In June 1889, Tokelau was made a British protectorate and was formally brought under the protection of the High Commissioner for the Western Pacific. The Union Jack flag was hoisted on each of the three islands. Under His Majesty's dominions according to earliest gazetted Order of His Majesty in Council dated 29 February 1916, the three islands in the Pacific Ocean were brought under the Council, which were then known as the Union Islands or just Tokelau. The order also authorised encroachments of the boundaries of the colony of Gilbert and Ellice Islands to subsume Tokelau Island. By the Order of October 1925, Tokelau was made an independent dominion and the Governor-General of New Zealand was charged with its administration. Under subsequent amendments to the Act of 1925, Western Samoa was given charge of Tokelau Islands. It was also stipulated that the islands should become part of New Zealand for which the necessary legislation was ordered to be passed by the Parliament of New Zealand by a specific date. It remained a colony of the United Kingdom through 1926. Constitutional documents of interest during this period include:

- Native Laws of the Union Group (1912)
- Order in Council Annexing the Union Islands to the Gilbert and Ellice Islands Colony (1916)
- Native Laws Ordinance (1917)
- Union Islands (No 1 and No 2) Order in Council (1925)
- Notice of Proclamation of the Union Islands (No 1) Order in Council (1926)

== New Zealand Administration (1926–1993) ==
After it was made a dependency as a New Zealand territory, it was administered by the departments of the New Zealand government (1926–1993). The Tokelau Act of 1948 was an act passing sovereignty of the Pacific territory of Tokelau to New Zealand. It was issued on 29 October 1948 and was amended on 9 December 1976 under section 2(1) of the Tokelau Amendment Act of 1976. The principal acts of the Tokelau Islands were further amended initially by Tokelau Islands Amendment Act 1967 and subsequently Tokelau Islands Amendment Act 1970 under which the words Island were dropped from the wordings and the name of the islands was changed to "Tokelau" only. Further amendment was made under Tokelau Islands Amendment Act 1974 in which more clarifications on deletion of words "Tokelau Islands" were affected, while the Tokelau Act 1976 was related to the Territorial Sea and Fishing Zone. Further Amendment Acts were established in 1982, 1986 and 1996. Documents of interest during this period include:

- Union Islands Transfer of Control to New Zealand (1926)
- Union Islands (No 1 of New Zealand) Order (1926)
- Union Islands (Revocation) Order in Council (1948)
- Tokelau Act 1948

== Self-government within New Zealand (1994–) ==
Flag of Tokelau

In subsequent subsection amendments of the Tokelau Amendment Act 1999, issued in July 2001 the directive was specific to the Tokelau (Employer for Tokelau Public Service) Order 2001. Under this amendment the powers of the New Zealand State Services Commissioner was transferred to the Tokelau Employment Commission to administer the Tokelau Public Service. Since 1994, it has vast self-governing powers, but not the status of an independent country. Two referendums have opposed any change in its present status. Tokelau remains a territory of New Zealand as two referendums held for self-government failed to muster enough support even though the United Nations had urged them to become independent. This vote was in spite of an assurance that they would retain their New Zealand citizenship and $11 million a year grant would not be withdrawn. Documents of interest during this period include the Tokelau Amendment Act 1996 (Preamble) and the Joint Statement of the Principles of Partnership (2003).

Unofficial local flag

The amended acts authorised the specific issue of coins of "Tokelau 2000 Queen Elizabeth the Queen Mother Commemorative Five Dollars" and gold coins of the "Tokelau 1999 Smallest Gold Coins Commemorative Ten Dollars". The former coin is embossed with picture of His late Majesty King George VI and Her late Majesty the Queen Mother standing to the right acknowledging the greetings of the people assemble below the balcony. The ten-dollar gold coin made of pure gold weighs 1.2442 grammes and is of 13.92 millimetres diameter.
