= Languages of Tokelau =

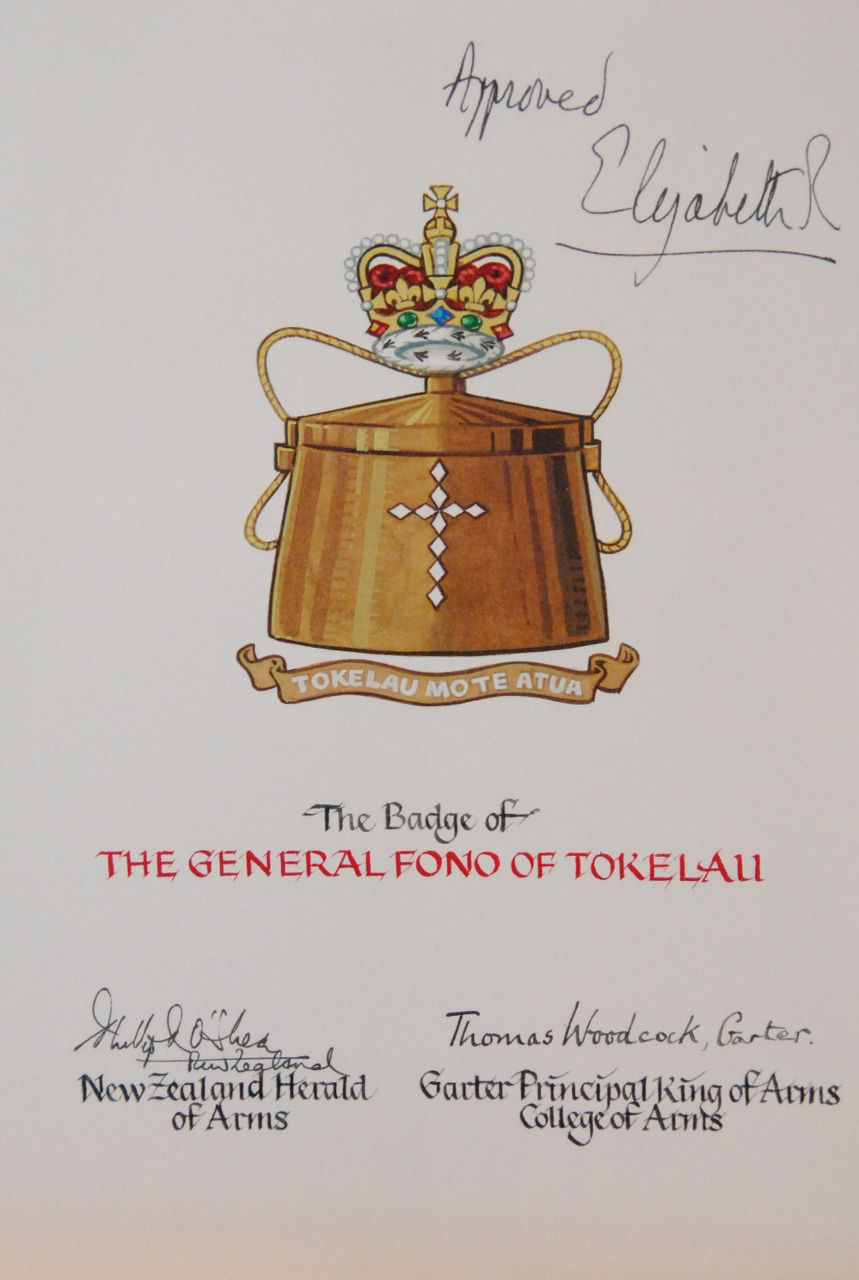
- Badge of the General Fono, with motto in Tokelauan (lit. 'Tokelau for God')
- Official: Tokelauan, English
- Main: Tokelauan (94.1%)
- Indigenous: Tokelauan
- Minority: English (59.2%), Samoan (42.0%), Tuvaluan (11.7%), Kiribati (2.7%)

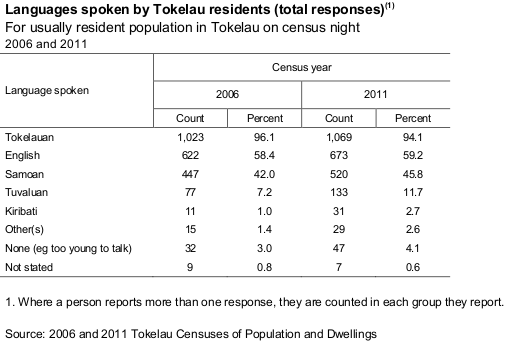
Languages spoken by Tokelau residents, 2011

Tokelau has two official languages: Tokelauan and English. Over 90% of the population speaks Tokelauan, and just under 60% speak English. Also, 45.8% of the population speak Samoan, and small percentages of the population speak Tuvaluan and Kiribati.

== Change over time ==
Since 2006, there has been growth in the proportion of the Tokelau population who can speak languages other than the country's native tongue. In contrast, the proportion of the total population able to speak Tokelauan has dropped, from 96.1% (in 2006) to 94.1% (in 2011).

The biggest difference since 2006 in languages spoken is the proportion of the population able to carry out a conversation in Tuvaluan, up from 7.2% (in 2006) to 11.7% (in 2011).

== Multilingualism ==
In Tokelau, approximately two-thirds (67.6%) of the population were able to speak two or more languages. Also, a large proportion of the population (40.7%) could converse in three or more languages.

The most-common number of languages spoken on Atafu and Fakaofo atolls was three languages. Just over one-third (34.6%) of Atafu residents spoke three languages, compared with 33.3% on Fakaofo and 24.6% on Nukunonu. The most-common number of languages spoken on Nukunonu was one language. Almost half (43.9%) of Nukunonu residents spoke only one language.

People in the younger age groups were more likely to speak only one or two languages. Over half (57.2%) of 0- to 9-year-olds spoke one language; 45.3% of 10- to 19-year-olds spoke two languages. We can note that 4.3% of the Tokelau population had no language (i.e. they were too young to talk) – 87.8% of these people were aged 0 to 9 years.

In contrast, the majority of 30- to 59-year-olds (62.7%) spoke three or more languages.

== Tokelauan language endangerment ==
There are fewer than 5000 speakers of the Tokelauan language making it an endangered language. The struggle to teach a language that is spoken by only handful of people is great, especially when widely known language such as English, serve as a much greater benefit in their society. The Heritage language of the community starts to diminish as parents of the native language stray away from teaching their child(ren) Tokelauan, in hopes that they will succeed in learning the more dominant language of the villages. The older generations of people living in the Tokelau Islands speak both Tokelauan and Samoan, but the younger generation, due to the newer schooling system, are apt to speaking English rather than Samoan. A census in 2001 revealed that in New Zealand, only 44 percent of the people with a Tokelauan background could hold a conversation in the language, compared to 53 percent in 1996. Comparably, a meager 29 percent of New Zealand-born Tokelauans reported being able to speak the language, compared to the 71 percent born in the three atolls.
