= Te Vakai =

Tokelauan English-language newsletter

- Front page of the Tenth Edition of Te Vakai
- Language: English
- Country: Tokelau
- Free online archives: Website

Te Vakai is a Tokelauan newsletter published in the English language.

== History ==
Initially published under the name Te Vakai Tokelau by New Zealand's Ministry of Foreign Affairs in 1976, the newsletter was initially a quarterly, bilingual publication, offering articles in both Tokelauan and English. Publication was later taken over by the Office of Tokelauan Affairs, and was eventually stopped entirely.

In September 2010, the decision was made to start publishing Te Vakai again. On this topic, Tokelau's General Manager, Joe Suveinakama, has stated "Communication and the dissemination of information is a big issue for any administration. That is why I am quite happy that Te Vakai is rolling again."

== Online presence ==
Starting from the September 2010 issue, editions of Te Vakai have been available on from the Tokelauan government's website, however new editions have not been uploaded since 2012.

Te Vakai also has a Facebook account which is used for advertising its stories.
