= Loimata Iupati =

Tokelauan politician

Loimata Ahela Iupati is a senior administrator and educator from the Pacific territory of Tokelau.

Iupati is the resident director of education of Tokelau. This is geographically a series of Pacific atolls which collectively form a territory of New Zealand.

In 1996 Iupati was part of a team appointed to translate the Bible into Tokelauan. This language is a Polynesian one, akin to Samoan and intelligible to speakers of Tuvaluan.

In 1990, Iupati was awarded the New Zealand 1990 Commemoration Medal.
