= Internet in Tokelau =

Internet in Tokelau is provided by Teletok, the government-owned communications corporation, and Taloha Inc., a private company formed by the Dutch Joost Zuurbier.

== History ==
In the year 2000, Joost Zuurbier realised that as Tokelau held an ISO 3166-1 alpha-2 country code it was entitled to a domain name under ICANN regulations. He went to Tokelau and negotiated a deal under which his company would be able to act as the registrar for .tk domain names, in exchange for a licensing fee and the provision of free internet connectivity for the residents of the atolls.

Before this, the three atolls had only one computer each, and the internet connection was so slow that it could only be used for email, without attachments. According to Zuurbier, an internet connection that would cost $10 per month in the United States costs approximately $2000 per month to provide in Tokelau, and because Tokelau has a GDP (PPP) per capita of only $1035, most Tokelauans would be unable to afford an internet connection without outside assistance.

== Present situation ==
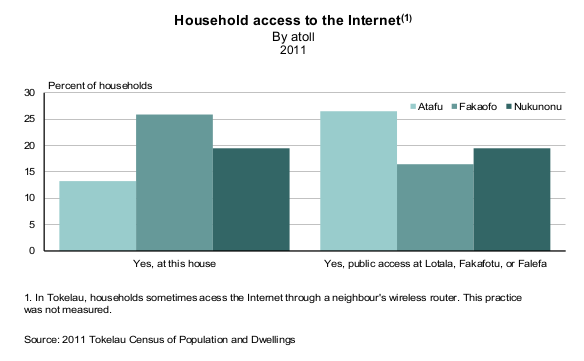
Internet access by atoll, 2011

In Tokelau, there are several free internet cafes, and some households have their own wireless internet connection.

According to Tokelau's 2011 Census, Fakaofo had the highest proportion of households that accessed the Internet, either at their house or at a public access point (42.4%). Atafu was next (39.8%), and Nukunonu was close behind (39.0%).

Households on Fakaofo were most likely to access the Internet at their house, with 25.9% doing so.

It is common practice for households to use their neighbours' wireless Internet connection, but sign into the network using their own logon, however this practice was not measured by the census.

This section contains content derived from the 2011 Tokelau Census, produced by Statistics New Zealand, which is licensed under the Creative Commons Attribution 3.0 New Zealand License. See for the full citation.
