= Health care in Tokelau =

The health care system in Tokelau is operated by the Tokelau Department of Health. Each of the three atolls of Tokelau has a 12-bed hospital that works as part of the Samoa region to provide primary health care to the community. Each hospital is staffed by a medical officer, four to five nurses, and other staff. The hospital at Nukunonu (St Josephs) has been developed as a national referral hospital since 2015.

The health services has a Director of Health based in Apia, Samoa, and a Chief Clinical Advisor who moves from atoll to atoll as required to assist the doctors attached to each hospital. As of 2007 the hospitals were heavily reliant on locum doctors who come for 3–6 months. Most of the time there was no doctor on an atoll and the hospital was run by the nurses. Upcoming Tokelauan medical graduates are believed to be alleviating this shortage.

In Tokelau, skin infections, influenza, gastro-enteritis and upper respiratory tract infections are common. Tuberculosis still exists. The major causes of death are pneumonia, heart disease and cancer. In recent years diabetes and gout have increased, attributed to the reliance on imported Western foods (such as sugar, flour, rice and potatoes), and the resultant declining healthy lifestyles. Over half the adult population smoke daily, and there is heavy alcohol consumption and a high incidence of obesity. The change in dietary trends has also seen a decline in dental health.

== See also ==
- Smoking in Tokelau
