= Peniuto Semisi =

Tokelauan politician

Peniuto Semisi is a Tokelauan politician and former member of the Parliament of Tokelau.
