= Literacy in Tokelau =

In 2011, the Tokelauan Census for the first time asked a series of questions about reading and writing skills.

== Tokelauan reading ==
As of 2011, less than 1% of Tokelauans are unable to read in the Tokelauan language, with little variation due to age. 90.4% of Tokelauans reported being 'good' or 'very good' at reading Tokelauan.

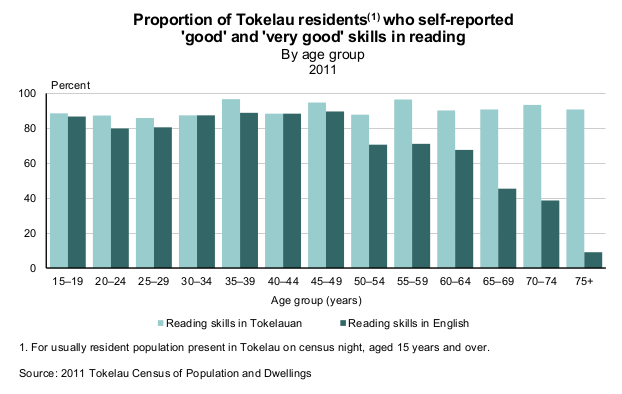
Reading by age in Tokelau, 2011

== English reading ==
In the Tokelauan Census of 2011, it was found that age played a major part in determining English reading skills - 75.5% of Tokelau residents aged 15 years or over reported having 'good' or 'very good' English reading skills, whereas only 9.1% of Tokelauans aged 75 or over reported this.

No significant distinction could be found between the gender balance of those that reported having 'very good' English reading skills, however illiteracy in English is more common in Tokelauan females than in Tokelauan males.

== Tokelauan writing ==
Just under 90% of Tokelauans, as of 2011, claim to have 'good' or 'very good' skills in Tokelauan writing. Only 1.4% of Tokelauans are unable to write in the Tokelauan language.

== English writing ==
The proportion of females in Tokelau with 'very good' English writing skills is greater than that of Tokelauan males. However the proportion of Tokelauan females that cannot write in English at all is also greater than that of Tokelauan males.

Middle aged people were found to have the best English writing skills, with 85.5% of Tokelauans aged between 30 and 49 years reporting 'good' or 'very good' English writing ability.
