= Human rights in Tokelau =

As prescribed in the Constitution of Tokelau, individual human rights are those found in the Universal Declaration of Human Rights and reflected in the International Covenant on Civil and Political Rights. When exercising these rights, there must be proper recognition of the rights of others and to the community as a whole. If an individual believes their rights have been breached they may go to the Council for the Ongoing Government who may make any appropriate order to protect that individual's rights. There have been no such complaints to date.

== International treaties ==
Tokelau currently recognises itself as a part of New Zealand under the Tokelau Act 1948. Because of this, Tokelau has a limited international legal personality. In regards to international treaties, ratification is done by the New Zealand Government who extends their authority to include Tokelau by an express statement once the Government of Tokelau has been consulted. If Tokelau were to become a state in free association with New Zealand, then they would have the capacity to ratify treaties under their own name. There have been two referendums attempts in Tokelau to move to self-government. These occurred in 2006 and in 2007, however there was not enough required support for Tokelau to change its status.

Treaties that apply to Tokelau include the International Covenant on Civil and Political Rights (ICCPR), its two optional protocols, the Convention on the Elimination of all forms of Discrimination Against Women (CEDAW), the United Nations Convention Against Torture, the International Covenant on Economic, Social and Cultural Rights (ICESCR) and the International Convention on the Elimination of All Forms of Racial Discrimination (ICERD).

An example of a treaty that New Zealand has ratified but does not apply to Tokelau is the Convention on the Rights of the Child (CRC).

Tokelau also participates in some regional organisations with New Zealand's support. These include the Secretariat of the Pacific Community, the Pacific Islands Forum Fisheries Agency, the Pacific Regional Environment Programme, the Council of the University of the South Pacific and the UN Educational and Scientific Organisation.

== Overview of Tokelauan human rights ==
Human rights were not mentioned in Tokelauan legislation until the Human Rights Rules 2004. These rules were very basic and are now what is incorporated in the Constitution of Tokelau 2007. Tokelau accepts the principles of the Universal Declaration of Human Rights.

== The right to education ==
The right to an education is found in Article 26 of the Universal Declaration of Human Rights and Article 13 of the International Covenant on Economic, Social and Cultural Rights (ICESCR). The Constitution of Tokelau gives no indication to the meaning of each individual right, but states that the sources of law include "the general principles of international law"; therefore the ICESCR can be used to define what the right to education actually means. The ICESCR goes into some detail on what the right to education entails. It states all primary education should be free and compulsory. Secondary education should be generally available and accessible to all, as should any higher education. It then goes on to say there needs to be development in school systems that are free from discrimination, with set minimum standards and a high level of quality.

Tokelau conforms with its human rights obligations in that up to the age of 16 years, education is free, and under s63 of the Crimes, Procedure and Evidence Rules 2003, school is compulsory until the age of 16. There are three schools across the three atolls, all of whom teach from early childhood up to year 11. Year 12 and 13 students are offered foundation and transition courses. There is no university in Tokelau, so if students wish to progress to further education, they need to either study via correspondence or relocate to another country such as Samoa.

New Zealand conducted an educational review of Tokelau in February 2014, and found "the overall quality of teaching does not enable all Tokelauan students to achieve the education standards outlined in the Tokelau National Curriculum Policy Framework". The same report went on to find that none of the schools were well resourced in facilities and teaching materials.

In the Annex to the National Report of the Universal Periodic Review, it was acknowledged in the section on Tokelau that it is highly challenging to recruit and retain qualified and skilled teachers in the education sector in Tokelau. This is because Tokelau is so isolated from other countries.

== The right to an adequate standard of living ==
The right to an adequate standard of living under the Universal Declaration of Human Rights is there for the health and well-being of individuals and their families. This includes having access to medical care, food, clothing and housing.

=== The right to healthcare ===
There are three hospitals in Tokelau, one is located on each of the three atolls. They are the primary healthcare facilities for Tokelauan residents. Each hospital has 12 beds, none of which have the capacity for intensive care patients. In the case of serious injuries patients have to be evacuated to Samoa and in some cases to New Zealand.

Tokelau ensures they are adhering to Article 25 of the Universal Declaration of Human Rights in regards to access to healthcare by making all dental and medical services free to the citizens of Tokelau. This includes the prescription of essential medicines. Where a person is required to go to Samoa for healthcare the Tokelauan Government provides a subsidy.

New Zealand's National Report for the Universal Periodic Review provides a section on Tokelau which states that statistical information in regards to the health levels of Tokelauan's is unavailable making it difficult to understand the status of health issues such as obesity and disease rates. The report also outlined Tokelau's biggest challenge in providing health care is attracting medically trained staff to come and work in Tokelau. This challenge was largely attributed to being so isolated from other countries. The World Health Organization has recognised that the flow on effects from having recruitment issues has led to health workers having to run the hospital and become accountable for a vast amount of high level duties.

=== The right to water and sanitation ===
The right to water is recognised under ICESCR which is recognised in the Constitution of Tokelau and also CEDAW, to which Tokelau is a party.

Tokelau has very scarce water resources and because there are no fresh water surfaces on any of the atolls, it is solely dependent on rainwater as its source of fresh water. In recent years, climate change has resulted in much lower rain levels with drought periods lasting for much longer. This has made Tokelau along with many other islands in the Pacific struggle to conserve and store water for individual use. In the past, countries such as New Zealand and the United States have had to send emergency water supplies to Tokelau because it was on the verge of running out entirely. Sanitation facilities are also said to be poorly designed and wasting precious supplies of fresh water through the flushing system.

Due to Tokelau being a New Zealand territory and not an independent, it was unable to take advantage of the Pacific Adaption to Climate Change (PACC) programme when it was introduced in 2009. In 2011 that Australian Government supplied additional funding allowing for what was known as the PACC+ programme that Tokelau was allowed to be a part of. Since 2011, the Tokelau PACC+ project has been progressively working towards more sustainable solutions in regards to rainwater harvesting and storage to ensure that everyone in Tokelau can continue to have access to what is considered a basic right.

== The right to a fair trial ==
The Crimes, Procedure and Evidence Rules (CPER) 2003 sets out Tokelau's criminal code. Part II of the CPER and onwards sets out numerous sections all in relation to trial circumstances and processes for both criminal and civil trials. According to the Annex of the National Report, the rules set out are all consistent with and set out to satisfy Tokelau's fair trial obligations.

== See also ==
- LGBT rights in Tokelau
