= Luana Liki Hotel =

Coordinates: 9.195865°S 171.852887°W

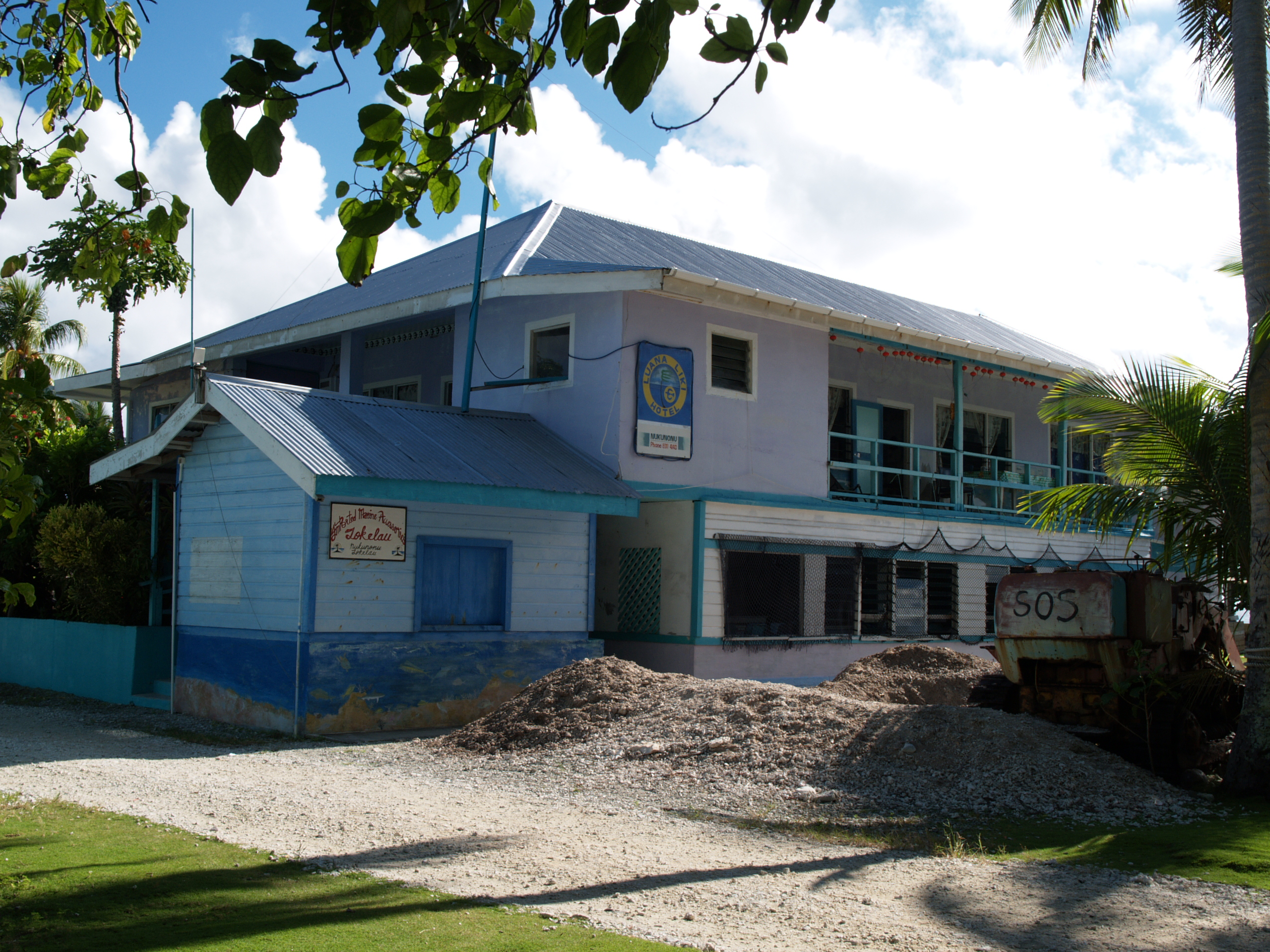
- Luana Liki Hotel
- Interactive map of the Luana Liki Hotel area

General information
- Location: Nukunonu, Tokelau

Website
- www.nukunonu.tk/page003.html

Luana Liki Hotel is a hotel in Nukunonu, Tokelau. It is the only hotel in Tokelau. Numerous distinguished guests have stayed at the hotel including former New Zealand Prime Minister Helen Clark and the New Zealand Governor General.

The Luana Liki Hotel in Nukunonu is also the only public eating and drinking place in Tokelau. The hotel also serves Samoan beer but its sale is rationed.
