= Public holidays in Tokelau =

Public holidays in Tokelau are described in the Interpretation Rules 2003 as "New Year's Day, Good Friday, Easter Monday, Mother's Day, Father's Day, Tokehega Day, White Sunday, Christmas Day, Boxing Day, and any day declared by a village to be a public holiday". Although some New Zealand public holidays, such as Waitangi Day and ANZAC Day are celebrated in Tokelau, these are not official holidays.

== Tokehega Day ==
Tokehega Day is celebrated on 3 September, the date that the Treaty of Tokehega came into effect in 1983.
