= List of birds of Tokelau =

Location of Tokelau in Oceania

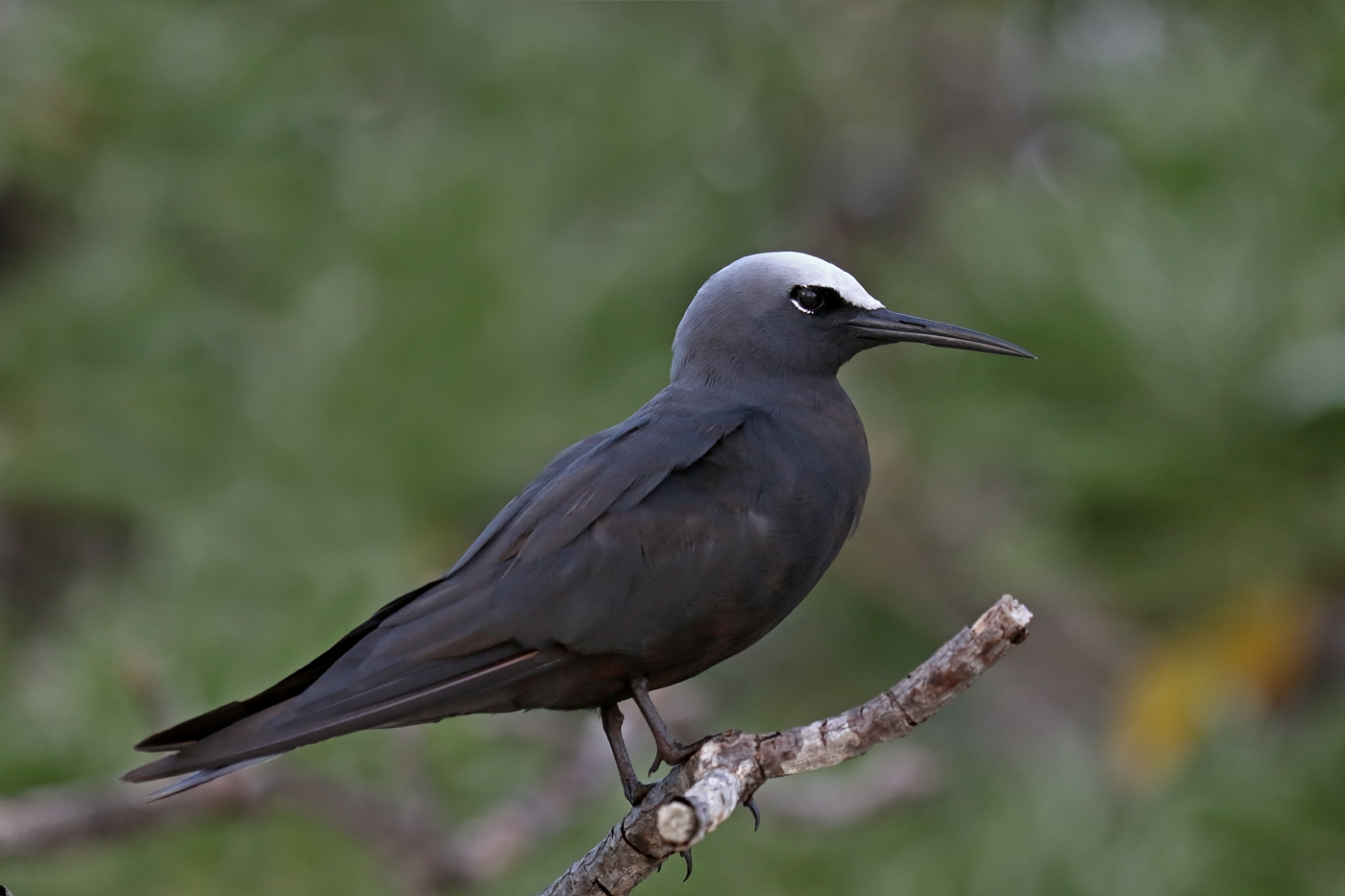
The black noddy is one of the most common birds in Tokelau.

Tokelau is a dependent territory of New Zealand in Polynesia in the Pacific Ocean, comprising three coral atolls with a total land area of 10.1 km^{2} (3.9 sq mi). There are 33 species of birds that have been recorded from Tokelau, of which one, the red junglefowl, has been introduced by humans. Anas ducks are also seasonal visitors to the islands. The most common species in Tokelau are the black noddy, brown noddy, and white tern, which each have populations of thousands of pairs on each of the atolls. Three species of birds found in Tokelau, the bristle-thighed curlew, bar-tailed godwit, and flesh-footed shearwater, are near-threatened. One species, the Australian masked-owl, is locally extinct. Before the arrival of humans, Tokelau may also have been inhabited by Halcyon kingfishers, Gallirallus and Porzana rails, Acrocephalus warblers, Aplonis starlings, Prosobonia sandpipers, and fruit doves.

Tokelau has a moist tropical climate year-round, with an average temperature of 28 °C (82 °F) and a mean annual rainfall of over 3,000 mm (120 in). The atolls consist of coral rubble of different sizes, with poor quality soil overlying coral rock. Plant diversity is low, with forest on the inner side of the atolls comprising mainly coconut palm, along with other tropical trees like Cordia subcordata, Pisonia grandis, Guettarda speciosa, and Pandanus. Undergrowth mainly consists of bird's-nest fern (Asplenium nidus). Vegetation nearer the beach is more diverse, with very little soil and plants like Scaevola taccada and Morinda citrifolia.

This list's taxonomic treatment (designation and sequence of orders, families, and species) and nomenclature (common and scientific names) follow the conventions of the 2022 edition of The Clements Checklist of Birds of the World. The family accounts at the beginning of each heading reflect this taxonomy, as do the species counts found in each family account. Introduced and accidental species are included in the total counts for Tokelau.

The following tags have been used to highlight several categories. Not all species fall into one of these categories. Those that do not are commonly occurring native species.

- (A) Accidental – a species that rarely or accidentally occurs in Tokelau
- (I) Introduced – a species introduced to Tokelau as a consequence, direct or indirect, of human actions
- (Ex) Extirpated – a species that no longer occurs here although populations may exist elsewhere

== Pheasants, grouse, and allies ==
Order: Galliformes Family: Phasianidae

The Phasianidae are a family of terrestrial birds that consist of quails, partridges, snowcocks, francolins, spurfowls, tragopans, monals, pheasants, peafowls, and jungle fowls. In general, they are plump (although they vary in size) and have broad, relatively short wings.

- Red junglefowl, Gallus gallus (I)

== Pigeons and doves ==
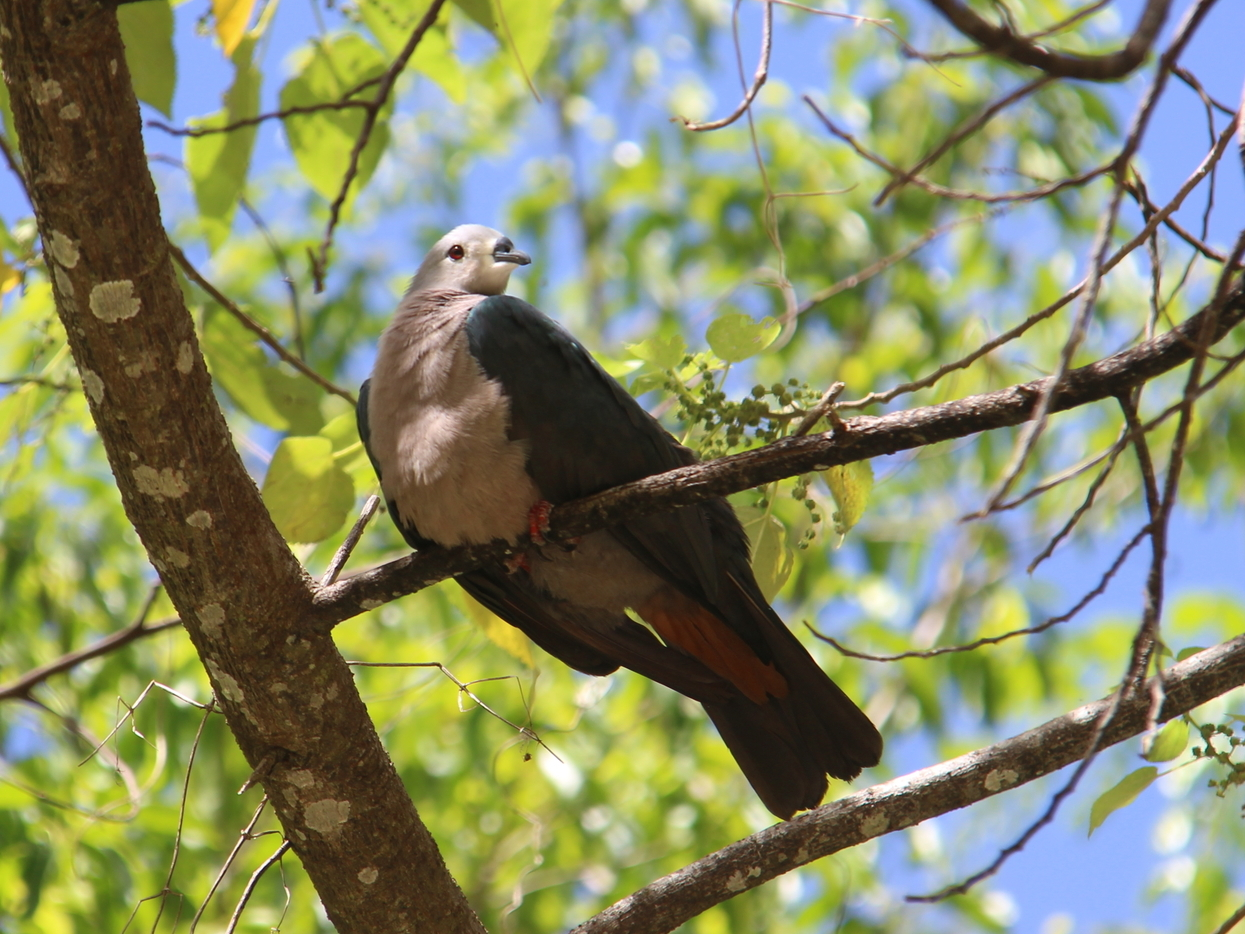
Pacific imperial-pigeon

Order: Columbiformes Family: Columbidae

Pigeons and doves are stout-bodied birds with short necks and short slender bills with a fleshy cere.

- Pacific imperial-pigeon, Ducula pacifica

== Cuckoos ==
Order: Cuculiformes Family: Cuculidae

The family Cuculidae includes cuckoos, roadrunners, and anis. These birds are of variable size with slender bodies, long tails, and strong legs. Many of the species are brood parasites.

- Long-tailed koel, Eudynamys taitensis

== Plovers and lapwings ==
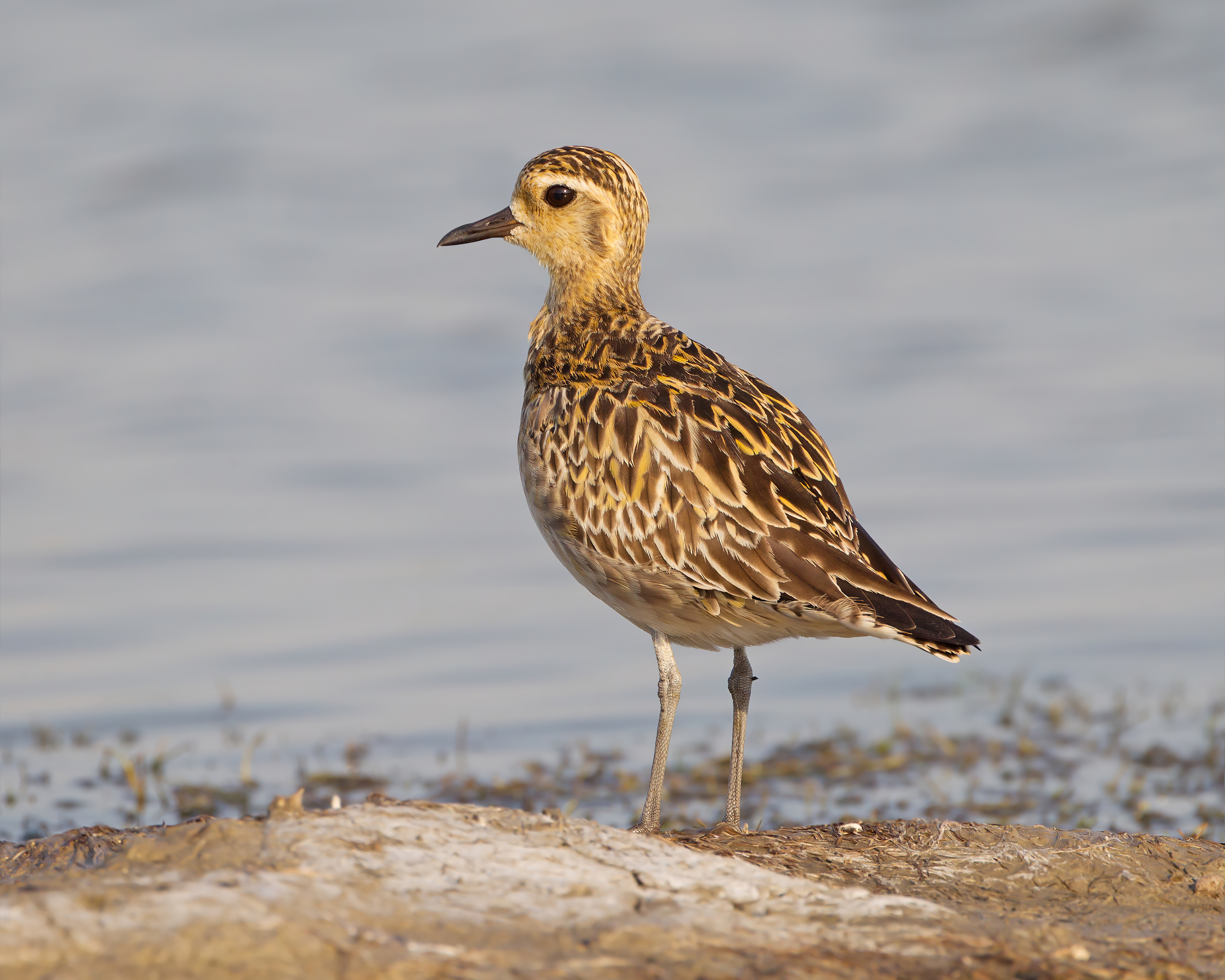
Pacific golden-plover in non-breeding plumage

Order: Charadriiformes Family: Charadriidae

The family Charadriidae includes the plovers, dotterels, and lapwings. They are small to medium-sized birds with compact bodies, short, thick necks, and long, usually pointed, wings. They are found in open country worldwide.

- Pacific golden-plover, Pluvialis fulva

== Sandpipers and allies ==
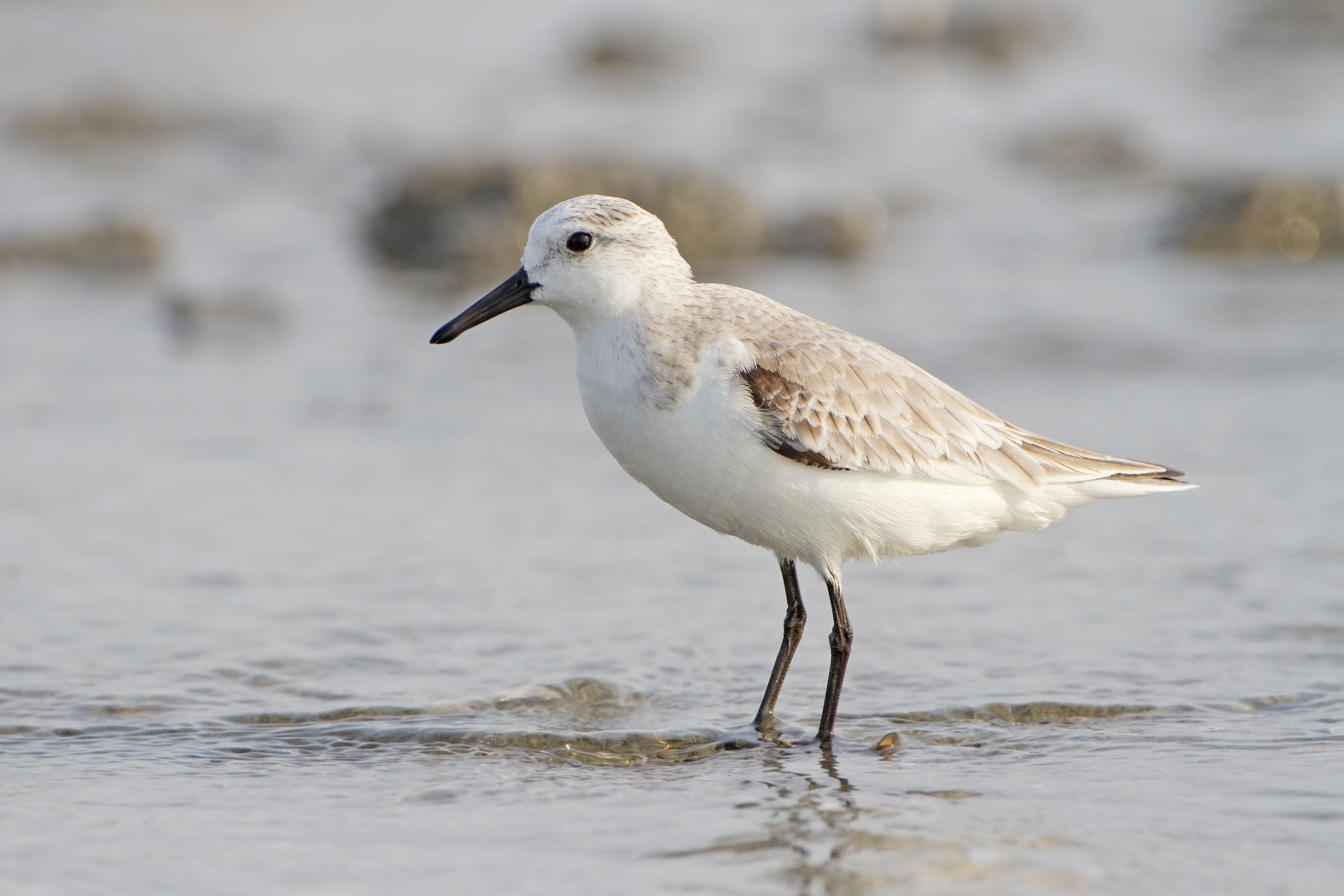
Sanderling in non-breeding plumage

Order: Charadriiformes Family: Scolopacidae

Scolopacidae is a large diverse family of small to medium-sized shorebirds including the sandpipers, curlews, godwits, shanks, tattlers, woodcocks, snipes, dowitchers, and phalaropes. The majority of these species eat small invertebrates picked out of the mud or soil. Some species have highly specialised bills adapted to specific feeding strategies.

- Bristle-thighed curlew, Numenius tahitiensis
- Whimbrel, Numenius phaeopus (A)
- Bar-tailed godwit, Limosa lapponica
- Ruddy turnstone, Arenaria interpres
- Sanderling, Calidris alba
- Wandering tattler, Tringa incana

== Gulls, terns, and skimmers ==
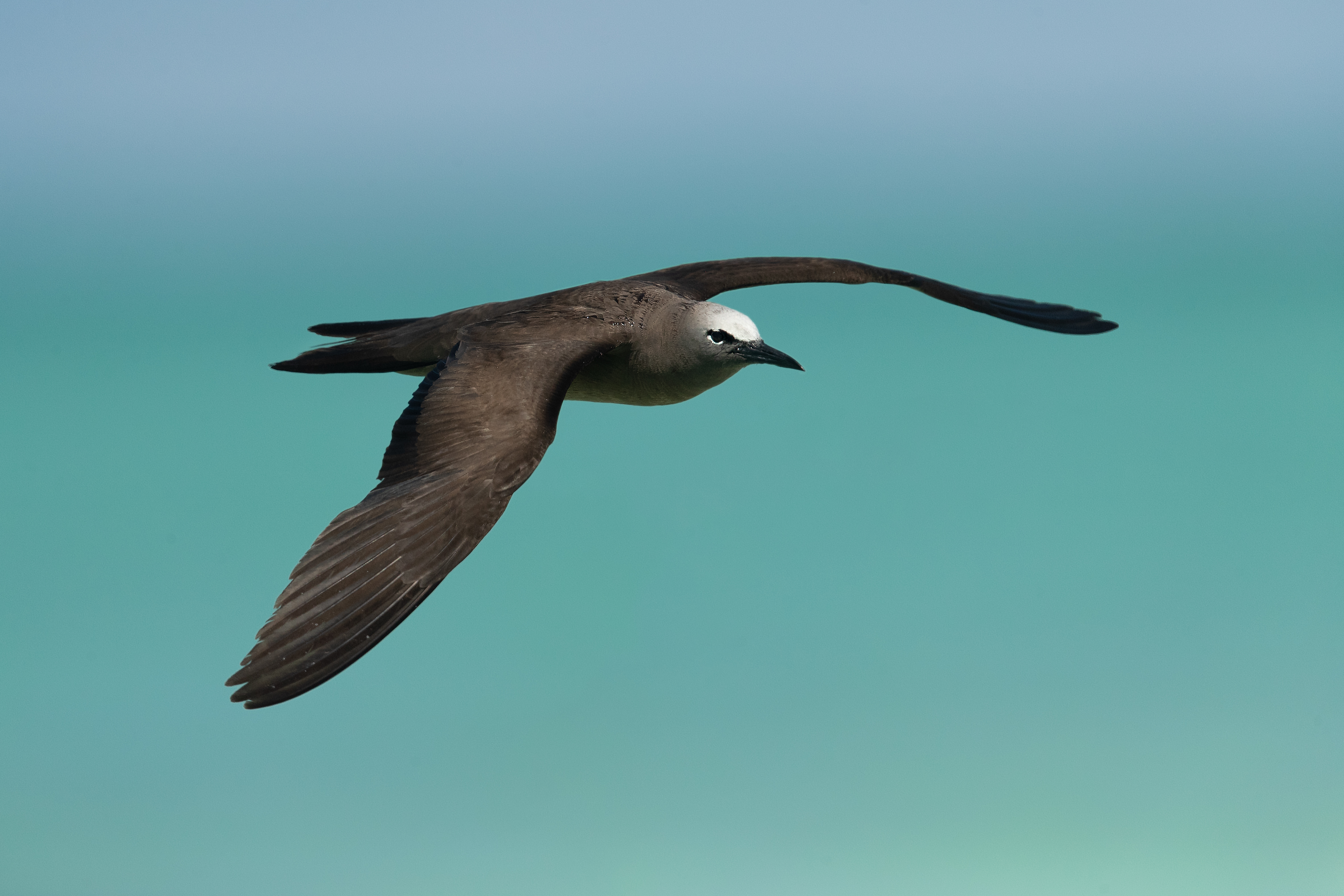
Brown noddy

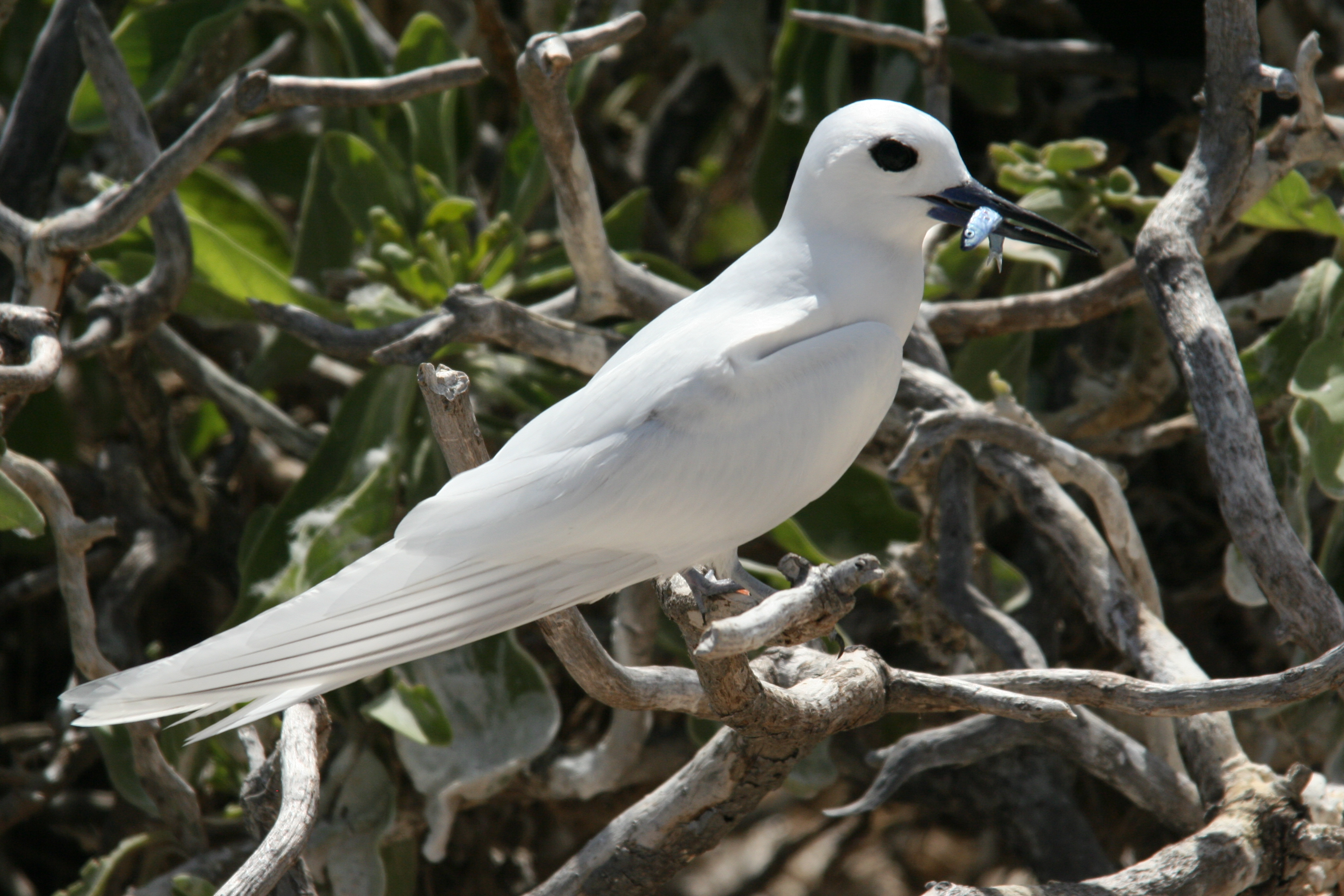
White tern

Order: Charadriiformes Family: Laridae

Laridae is a family of seabirds consisting of gulls, terns, and skimmers. Gulls are typically grey or white, often with black markings on the head or wings. Terns are generally smaller than gulls with more pointed wings and bills, many also having forked tails which help with aerial manoeuvrability. Both species can be found inland near lakes and rivers, however gulls have adapted well to human presence and can often be found in urban centers.

- Brown noddy, Anous stolidus
- Black noddy, Anous minutus
- Blue-gray noddy, Anous cerulea (A)
- White tern, Gygis alba
- Sooty tern, Onychoprion fuscatus
- Gray-backed tern, Onychoprion lunatus
- Black-naped tern, Sterna sumatrana
- Great crested tern, Thalasseus bergii

== Tropicbirds ==
Order: Phaethontiformes Family: Phaethontidae

Tropicbirds are slender white birds of tropical oceans, with exceptionally long central tail feathers. Their heads and long wings have black markings.

- White-tailed tropicbird, Phaethon lepturus
- Red-tailed tropicbird, Phaethon rubricauda

== Shearwaters and petrels ==
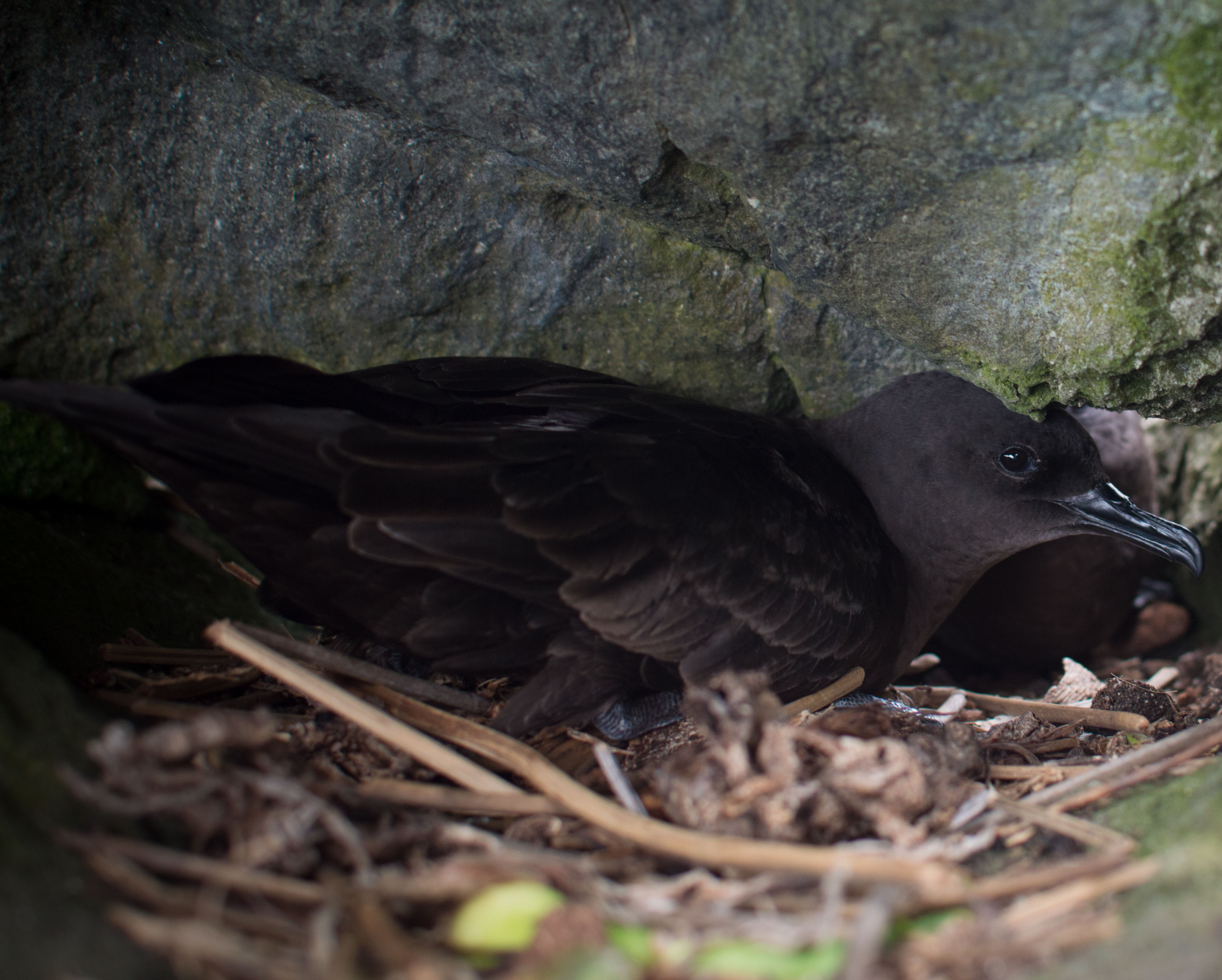
Bulwer's petrel

Order: Procellariiformes Family: Procellariidae

The procellariids are a group of medium-sized petrels, characterised by united nostrils with medium nasal septa and a long outer functional primary flight feather.

- Southern giant-petrel, Macronectes giganteus (A)
- Bulwer's petrel, Bulweria bulwerii (A)
- Flesh-footed shearwater, Ardenna carneipes
- Wedge-tailed shearwater, Ardenna pacificus (A)
- Christmas shearwater, Puffinus nativitatis (A)
- Tropical shearwater, Puffinus bailloni

== Frigatebirds ==
Order: Suliformes Family: Fregatidae

Frigatebirds are large seabirds usually found over tropical oceans. They are large, black and white or completely black, with long wings and deeply forked tails. The males have coloured inflatable throat pouches. They do not swim or walk and cannot take off from a flat surface. They are essentially aerial, able to stay aloft for days at a time.

- Lesser frigatebird, Fregata ariel
- Great frigatebird, Fregata minor

== Boobies and gannets ==
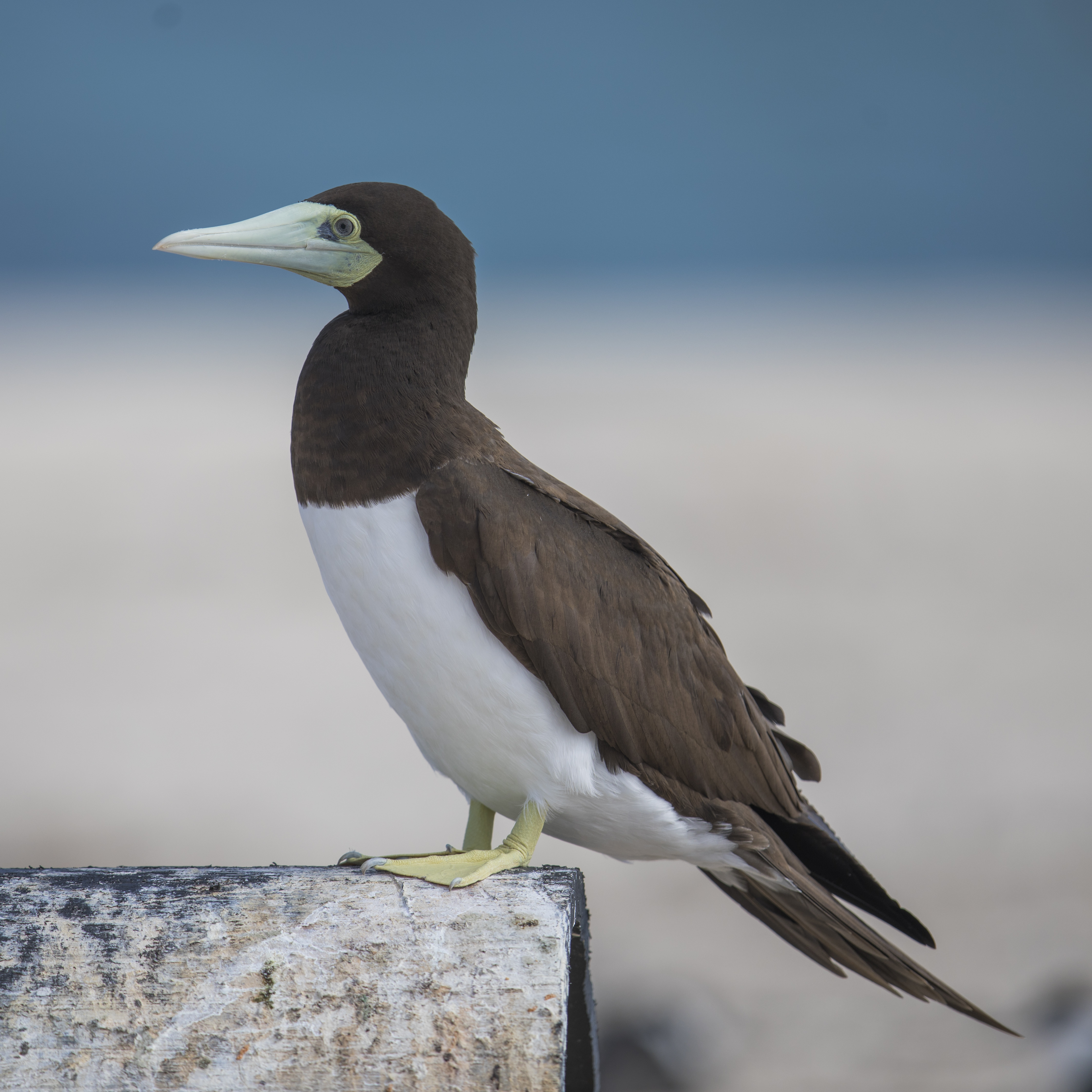
Female brown booby

Order: Suliformes Family: Sulidae

The sulids comprise the gannets and boobies. Both groups are medium to large coastal seabirds that plunge-dive for fish.

- Masked booby, Sula dactylatra (A)
- Brown booby, Sula leucogaster
- Red-footed booby, Sula sula

== Herons, egrets, and bitterns ==
Order: Pelecaniformes Family: Ardeidae

The family Ardeidae contains the bitterns, herons, and egrets. Herons and egrets are medium to large wading birds with long necks and legs. Bitterns tend to be shorter necked and more wary. Members of Ardeidae fly with their necks retracted.

- Pacific reef-heron, Egretta sacra

== Barn-owls ==
Order: Strigiformes Family: Tytonidae

Barn owls are medium-sized owls with large, flat heads, and characteristic heart-shaped faces. They have long legs with slightly curved talons.

- Australian masked-owl, Tyto novaehollandiae (Ex)

== See also ==
- List of birds
- Lists of birds by region
