= List of butterflies of Tokelau =

Location of Tokelau

A list of the native butterflies of Tokelau — a country of three tropical coral atolls, that is a dependent territory of New Zealand. It is located in the South Pacific Ocean.

== Nymphalidae ==
=== Danainae ===
- Euploea lewinii bourkei (Poulton, 1924)

=== Nymphalinae ===
- Hypolimnas bolina pallescens (Butler, 1874)
- Junonia villida villida (Fabricius, 1787)

== See also ==
- Butterflies of Oceania
- Lepidoptera of Oceania
