= Television in Tokelau =

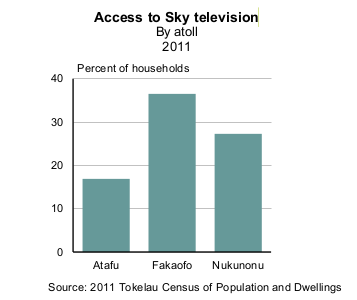
Access to Sky television by atoll in 2011

The only television service available in Tokelau is the pay TV network Sky Television. There are no networks that can be viewed free of charge.

In the 2011 census, it was found that a similar percentage of households on each of Tokelau's atolls owned televisions, with figures ranging between 64.9% and 67.9%. However, as of 2011, less than 50% of all households in Tokelau hold a subscription to the service.
