= Tokelau Scholarship Scheme =

The Tokelau Scholarship Scheme, officially known as the Government of Tokelau Scholarships (GoTS) Scheme, is a program run by the Tokelauan government in which eligible Tokelauan students are able to receive scholarships to study overseas, either in New Zealand or other locations in the Pacific. As a precondition of accepting the scholarship, students are required to return to Tokelau upon completion of their training so that they may use their skills to contribute to the country's development. Failure to do so will result in the student being required to pay for 60% of the tuition fees.

== Educational institutions ==
The Tokelau Scholarship Scheme favours "internationally recognized Pacific region tertiary institutions", examples being the University of the South Pacific and the Fiji Institute of Technology. However, applications to study in New Zealand and tertiary institutions which, for whatever reason, do not meet the above criteria can be approved on a case-by-case procedure.

== Types of scholarships ==
Three types of scholarships are available under the Tokelau Scholarship Scheme: Development Scholarships, Short Term Training Awards and Reverse Scholarships.

Development Scholarships are scholarships in which the student goes overseas for full-time undergraduate study. Short Term Training Awards, introduced in 2012, are payments made to support a student in vocational training for a period of no more than one year, subject to approval from an employer or Taupulega. Reverse Scholarships, the most recent addition introduced in 2013, are designed for students which have already completed overseas tertiary study in New Zealand but have not yet paid off their student loans. If such student decides to return to Tokelau to work in the public sector, then over an agreed-upon time the debt will be considered to be paid.
