= Religion in Tokelau =

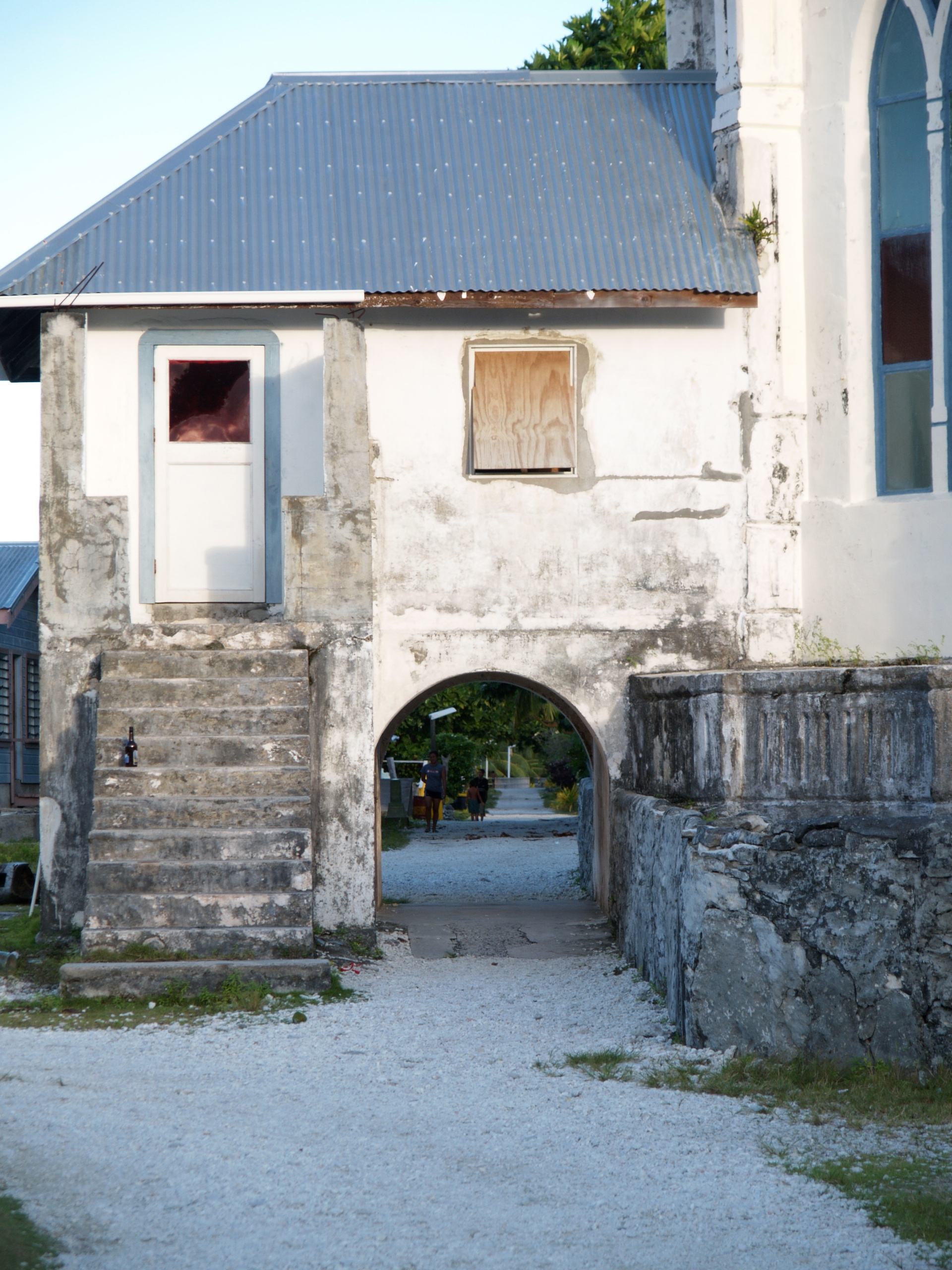
The back of the Catholic Church on Nukunonu in Tokelau. The arch goes over the main street of the village.

The vast majority of people in Tokelau are Christians and Christianity plays a significant role in the Tokelauan way of life.

Religion in Tokelau (ARDA 2020 est.)
1. Protestant (42.6%)
2. Catholic (27.6%)
3. Other Christian (24.1%)
4. Baháʼí (4.75%)
5. No religion (0.96%)

== History ==
Tui Tokelau was the primary god worshipped in the Tokelau along with the pantheon of Polynesian gods before Christianity.

Missionaries preached Christianity in Tokelau from 1845 to the 1860s. French Roman Catholic missionaries on Wallis Island (also known as 'Uvea) and missionaries of the Protestant London Missionary Society in Samoa used native teachers to convert the Tokelauans. Atafu was converted to Protestantism by the London Missionary Society, Nukunonu was converted to Catholicism and Fakaofo was converted to both denominations. Since 1992 the Roman Catholic Mission Sui Iuris of Tokelau has represented the Catholic church in Tokelau.

== Denominations ==
In 2016, all people who answered the religion question on the Tokelauan census gave one of the major Christian denominations as their religion- Congregational Christian Church (Ekalehia Fakalapotopotoga Kelihiano Tokelau) and Roman Catholic.

In 2016, 50.4% of respondents belonged to Congregational Christian Church, 38.7% were Roman Catholic, 5.9% were Presbyterian, 4.2% were other Christian and 0.8% were unspecified.

In 2011, 58.5% of respondents belonged to the Congregational Christian denomination and over one-third of respondents (36.8%) belonged to the Roman Catholic denomination. Of the remaining 4.7%, 1.8% were Presbyterian, 0.1% belonged to Spiritual and New Age religions, and 2.8% belonged to other Christian denominations

=== Variation by atoll ===
Religious affiliation of Tokelau residents by atoll of usual residence, 2016

In 2016, the majority of Tokelau’s usually resident population on Atafu (78.3%) and Fakaofo (62.7%) identified as Congregational Christians. While this denomination has remained the largest on both islands, the proportion of residents identifying with it has declined. On Atafu, the figure dropped from 95.4% in the 2006 Census to 89.8% in 2011. Similarly, on Fakaofo, it decreased from 70.7% in 2006 to 68.9% in 2011.

In 2016, the majority of residents in Nukunonu (81.8%) identified as Roman Catholic. Roman Catholicism has remained the dominant denomination among Nukunonu residents. The proportion of residents identifying has been decreased largely in 2016. In 2011, 93.9% of the usual residents were Roman Catholics, a slight decrease from 96.9% in 2006.

In contrast, the proportion of Catholics in Fakaofo has been increasing, up to 32.6% in 2016, from 25.9% in 2011 and 22.2% in 2006.
