= Flag of Tokelau =

Tokelau
- Use: State flag
- Proportion: 1:2
- Adopted: September 7, 2009; 17 years ago
- Design: A yellow Tokelauan canoe sailing towards the Southern Cross represented by four white stars on a blue field

Tokelau, a dependent territory of New Zealand, adopted an official flag in 2009. Previously, the flag of New Zealand was used as the official flag for Tokelau.

The flag features a blue field with a Tokelauan canoe sailing towards the Southern Cross. According to the Tokelauan government, the canoe symbolises Tokelau's journey towards finding the best governance structure for its people, whilst the Southern Cross symbolises a navigational aid for the journey.

In May 2008, the local parliament, the General Fono, approved a distinctive flag and national emblem for Tokelau. The Governor-General presented the flag to the Ulu-o-Tokelau as Tokelau's first official flag on 7 September 2009.

== Blazon ==
The official blazon of the flag of Tokelau is:

Azure a Tokelau Canoe Or in the hoist a constellation of the Southern Cross composed of four Mullets Argent.

== History ==
=== 1989 proposal ===
An alternative and unofficial flag has been reported. The three stars in this flag represent the three atolls which make up the islands of Tokelau.

1980s flag proposal

=== 2007 proposal ===
In June 2007 the regional parliament (General Fono) decided over the future flag, anthem and national symbol of Tokelau. The proposed flag depicted a stylized Polynesian canoe and four stars. The stars represent the three main islands and also Swains Island, administered by the United States (American Samoa) but claimed by Tokelau. As the required supermajority was not reached in the 2007 self-determination referendum, the flag was not officially adopted.

Flag selected by the General Fono in 2007

Reconstruction of 2007 flag

=== 2008 final proposal ===
In May 2008, the General Fono approved the final versions of the national symbols of Tokelau. The flag design approved is based on the 2007 proposal with minor changes to the arrangement of the stars, the Southern Cross is used in place of a representation of the geographic location of the islands. A national emblem was also approved at this time.

=== 2009 royal approval ===
The flag was approved by the General Fono in February 2009 and by Queen Elizabeth II in August. The governor-general presented the new flag to the Ulu as Tokelau's first official flag on 7 September 2009. An official launch of the new flag was planned for October 2009.

== See also ==
- Badge of Tokelau
- Te Atua o Tokelau
- Flag of Bosnia and Herzegovina – A flag with a similar appearance
