= Tokelauan language =

Polynesian language spoken in Tokelau

Tokelauan
- gagana Tokelau
- Native to: Tokelau, New Zealand
- Ethnicity: Tokelauans
- Native speakers: 1,200 in Tokelau (2020); 2,500 in New Zealand (2013 census); 825 in Australia (2021 census)
- Language family: Austronesian: Malayo-Polynesian; Central–Eastern Malayo-Polynesian?; Eastern Malayo-Polynesian; Oceanic; Central–Eastern Oceanic; Central Pacific; East Central Pacific; Polynesian; Nuclear Polynesian; Samoic or Ellicean; Pukapukic?; Samoan–Tokelauan?; Tokelauan
- Early form: Old Tokelauan
- Standard forms: Standard Tokeluan
- Dialects: Tokelauan dialects

Official status
- Official language in: Tokelau

Language codes
- ISO 639-2: tkl
- ISO 639-3: tkl
- Glottolog: toke1240
- ELP: Tokelauan
- Tokelauan is classified as Severely Endangered by the UNESCO Atlas of the World's Languages in Danger (2010).

Tokelauan (/toʊkəˈlaʊən/) is a Polynesian language spoken in Tokelau and historically by the small population of Swains Island (or Olohega) in American Samoa. It is closely related to Tuvaluan and is related to Samoan and other Polynesian languages. Tokelauan has a co-official status with English in Tokelau. There are approximately 4,260 speakers of Tokelauan, of whom 2,100 live in New Zealand, 1,400 in Tokelau, and 17 in Swains Island. "Tokelau" means "north-northeast".

Loimata Iupati, Tokelau's resident Director of Education, has stated that he is in the process of translating the Bible from English into Tokelauan. While many Tokelau residents are multilingual, Tokelauan was the language of day-to-day affairs in Tokelau until at least the 1990s, and is spoken by 88% of Tokelauan residents. Of the 4600 people who speak the language, 1600 of them live in the three atolls of Tokelau – Atafu, Nukunonu and Fakaofo. Approximately 3000 people in New Zealand speak Tokelauan, and the rest of the known Tokelauan speakers are spread across Australia, Hawaii, and the west coast of the United States. The Tokelauan language closely resembles its more widely spoken and close genealogical relative, Samoan; the two maintain a degree of mutual intelligibility.

== Documentation ==
Horatio Hale was the first person to publish a Tokelauan dictionary in 1846. Rather than being the accepted definition of dictionary, it was a reference that only contained 214 entries of vocabulary. Hale's publication remained the only published Tokelauan reference until 1969. However, Tokelauan had been instituted into schools in the late 1940s; prior to the publication, there was not much headway made in the teaching of the language. In 1969, the New Zealand Department of Education published D. W. Boardman's Tokelau–English Vocabulary. This second, more advanced reference was a collection of around 1200 vocabulary entries. In the times that passed after the second publication, the necessity of a more detailed and in depth reference to the language for the purpose of education with the Tokelauan community was realized by Hosea Kirifi (who later became the first Tokelau Director of Education) and J. H. Webster. In the year 1975, Kirifi and Webster published the first official precursory Tokelauan dictionary, which contained an estimated 3000 items, called the Tokelau–English Dictionary. This entire movement was based on the fact that the Tokelauan people take a great deal of pride in their language. Tokelauan schools lacked an abundance of resources and materials that could be used to educate their children on the language. It has a high place in their culture, and the revitalization and renewal of the language for their younger generation had eventually reached a point where action had to be taken. One year after the publication of the 1975 Tokelau–English Dictionary, the government approved the installation of Ropati Simona who was to head the Tokelau Dictionary Project. This eventually led to the publication of the first comprehensive Tokelauan dictionary, Tokelau Dictionary by the Office of Tokelau Affairs in 1986.

== Background ==
Tokelau is a dependency of New Zealand and has three main parts, which consist of atolls: Atafu, Nukunonu, and Fakaofo. Together these three atolls lie about two hundred sixty nautical miles away from Samoa. The three atolls of Tokelau are also known as the Duke of York, Duke of Clarence, and D'Wolf or Bowditch, respectively (on old maps). Together, they are known as The Union Islands, The Union Group, and as the Tokelau Islands. Tokelau's language, Tokelauan, belongs to the Austronesian language family and is considered to be part of the subgroup of Polynesian languages. More than half of the speakers of the Tokelauan language reside in New Zealand, about thirty percent live in either Atafu, Nukunonu, or Fakaofo, and a minority live in Australia (geographically close to New Zealand) and states in the United States that touch the Pacific Ocean (Hawaii and other western states part of the mainland). Since Tokelau lies very close to Samoa, it is common to think that the Tokelauan language has some Samoan language influences, but due to the lack in extensive documentation, it is inaccurate to assume such a thing. Tokelauan was still only considered to be a spoken language up until the 1960s. During the 1960s schools began teaching their peoples how to read and write their own language. Short works were also produced in Tokelauan. Additionally, it was common for adults to be fluent in Samoan and Tokelauan. The Tokelauan language is small, and has always been fairly small, even before the Europeans invaded, because of the limited resources that each atoll had, which limited the number of people that could be supported on each.

== Phonology ==
Vowel inventory
	Front		Central		Back	
	short	long	short	long	short	long
Close	i	iː			u	uː
Mid	e	eː			o	oː
Open			a	aː		

Long vowels are marked with a macron ⟨ā ē ī ō ū⟩. However, not all speakers agree with the use of the macron. Those residing in the three atolls of Tokelau are known to have shown much resistance to the macron, while the Tokelauan speakers of New Zealand are more open and accepting of adopting the use of this linguistic symbol.

Consonant inventory
		Labial	Alveolar	Velar	Glottal
Nasal		m	n	ŋ	
Plosive		p	t	k	
Fricative	voiceless	ɸ	(s)		h
Fricative	voiced	v			
Lateral			l		

- /s/ may occur in Samoan loanwords.

There are some phonetic similarities between sounds in the language, such as /h/ and /ɸ/, which results in some variation in orthographic practice. For example, toha and tofa both mean goodbye but can be pronounced differently. The sounds for h, s, f and wh can all be used interchangeably. There are two dialects in Polynesia, both of which have affected the pronunciation of the Tokelauan language. The h and wh sounds are from the older dialect, while the f and s sounds are from the newer one. The fact that all these sounds are interchangeable regardless of when they arrived at the islands suggests that no one dialect surpassed the other. Although Tokelauan is closely related to the Samoan language, there is a distinct difference between their pronunciation of words. For example, Samoan words containing the k sound can sound like g with words such as hiki often mistakenly heard as higi. Tokelauan language does not allow the k's to drop.

Although there is not a lot of available systemic data for Tokelauan word stressing, linguists have developed three rules relating to word stress and vowels based upon some previous evidence. The first rule is that a long vowel will receive the main stress. Secondly, with some exceptions to rule number one, the second to last vowel would bear the main stress (if the long vowel is not the main stress). And thirdly, words do not lose their normal stress when compounded with another word. Furthermore, monosyllabic grammatical morphemes are left unstressed.

== Orthography ==
Tokelauan alphabet
IPA
a	e	i	o	u	ɸ	ŋ	k	l	m	n	p	h	t	v
Grapheme
a	e	i	o	u	f	g	k	l	m	n	p	h	t	v

== Types of sentences ==
Similarly to English, each Tokelauan clause has a predicate. There are five types of predicate including verbal, locative, existential, possessive, and nominal. Each predicate is available for an interrogative and declarative statement, and can also have multiple predicates conjoined.

=== Verbal predicates ===
A verbal phrase will follow a verbal clause.

- Kua fano. 'She/he has gone.'

(An evaluative predicate can and usually does occur with no argument.)

=== Locative predicates ===
Preposition ⟨i⟩ and a noun phrase following a tense-aspect particle.

- E i te faleha te faifeau. 'The pastor is in the church.'

== Possessive pronouns ==
Below is a table displaying the predicative possessive pronouns in the Tokelauan language.

		Singular	Dual	Plural
1st person	incl	o oku, o kita a aku, a kite	o taua, o ta a taua, a ta	o tatou a tatou
1st person	excl	o oku, o kita a aku, a kite	o maua, o ma o a maua, a ma a	matou matou
2nd person		o ou/o koe a au/a koe	o koulua a koulua	o koutou a koutou
3rd person		o ona a ona	o laua, o la a laua, a la	o latou a latou

Shown below is a table showing Tokelauan premodifying possessive pronouns.

Possessor	Singular reference	Plural reference
1 singular	toku, taku, tota, tata	oku, aku, ota, ata
2 singular	to, tau	o, au
3 singular	tona, tana	ona, ana
1 dual incl.	to ta, to taua ta ta, ta taue	o ta, o taue a ta, a taua
1 dual excl.	to ma, to maua ta ma, ta maua	o ma, o maua a ma, a maua
2 dual	toulua, taulua	oulua, aulua
3 dual	to la, to laue ta la, ta laue	o la, o laua a la a laua
1 plural incl.	to tatou, ta tatou	o tatou, a tatou
1 plural excl.	to matou, ta matou	o matou, a matou
2 plural	toutou, tautau	outou, autou
3 plural	to latou, ta latau	o latou, a latou
	NON-SPECIFIC/INDEFINITE	
1 singular	hoku, hota haku, hata	ni oku, ni ota niaku, niata
2 singular	ho, hau	ni o, ni au
3 singular	hona, hana	ni ona, ni ana
1 dual incl.	ho ta, ho taua ha ta, ha taua	ni o ta, ni o taue ni a ta, ni a taua
1 dual excl.	ho ma, ho maua ha ma, ha maua	ni o ma, ni o maua ni a ma, ni a maua
2 dual	houlua, haulua	ni oulua, ni aulua

== Articles ==
There are two articles that are used in the English language. These articles are the and a/an. The usage for the word the when speaking of a noun is strictly reserved for the case in which the receiver of the word should be aware of its context, or if said item has been referred to previously. This is because in English, the word the acts as what is known as a definite article, meaning that a defined object or person is being spoken of. However, in the case of definite article usage in Tokelauan language, if the speaker is speaking of an item in the same manner as the English languages uses the, they need not to have referred to it previously so long as the item is specific. The same can be said for the reference of singular being. Because of the difference in grammatical ruling, although the definite article in the Tokelauan language is te, it is very common for it to translate to the English indefinite article a. An indefinite article is used when there is no specification of the noun being referred to. The usage of the word he, the indefinite article in Tokelauan is 'any such item'. In negative statements the word he is used because that is where it is most often found, as well as when phrasing a question. However, it is important to remember that just because these two types of statements are where he occurs the greatest it does not mean that he does not occur in other types of statements as well. Examples of both te and he are as such:

Tokelauan: Kua hau te tino
English: 'A man has arrived' or 'The man has arrived'
(Notice how te in Tokelauan has been translated to both a and the in English.)

Tokelauan: Vili ake oi k'aumai he toki
English: 'Do run and bring me an axe'

The use of he and te in Tokelauan are reserved for when describing a singular noun. When describing a plural noun, different articles are used. For plural definite nouns, nā is the article that is used. However, in some cases, rather than using nā, plural definite nouns are subject to the absence of an article represented by 0. The absence of an article is usually used if a large amount or a specific class of things are being described. An example of an exception to this commonality would be if one was describing an entire class of things, but in a nonspecific way. In this case, rather than nā as the article, the singular definite noun te would be used. The article ni is used for describing a plural indefinite noun. Examples of nā, a 0 exception, and ni are as such:

Tokelauan: Vili ake oi k'aumai nā nofoa
English: 'Do run and bring me the chairs'

Tokelauan: Ko te povi e kai mutia
English: 'Cows eat grass'
('Ko' in this sentence acts as a preposition to 'te'.)

Tokelauan: E i ei ni tuhi?
English: Are there any books?

(Notice that this is the use of an indefinite article in an interrogative statement. As mentioned above, the use of indefinite articles in these types of statements is very common.)

== Particles ==
The particles of the Tokelauan language are ia, a (or ā), a te, and ia te. When describing personal names as well as the names of the month, pronouns (the use here is optional and it is most commonly used when there are words in between the pronoun and verb), and collaborative nouns that describe a group of people working together the most common particle is used. This particle is ia, which is used so long as none of the nouns listed above follow the prepositions e, o, a, or ko. When the subject of a sentence is a locative or name of a place, ia is also used as the particle in those particular, as well as other specific instances. The particle a is used before a person's name as well as the names of months and the particle a te is used before pronouns when these instances are following the prepositions i or ki. If describing a pronoun and using the preposition mai, the article that follows is ia te.

== Morphology ==
There are four main classes of lexemes in the Tokelauan language, and are as follows:

1. Noun – A lexeme formed directly after a determiner or possessive pronoun to create a noun phrase
  - These can only function as nouns. Pronouns are a subset of nouns, so they cannot be combined with determiners.
    - He loi – an ant
    - Tona vaka – his canoe
2. Verb – A lexeme that comes directly after a verbal particle and expresses tense or aspect.
  - ka – future
  - ka fano – will go
  - koi – present continuous
  - Koi ola – still alive
  - A few lexemes are used only as a verb and do not attach to form a different phrase – ex. Galo = be lost, disappear
3. Locative – A lexeme that forms directly after the preposition (i, ki, or mai), without an additional determiner
  - luga – above
  - lalo – beneath
  - loto – inside
  - Place names and months have some characteristics of locatives
4. Small class of "other" lexemes that don't fit into the other three classes
  - ananafi – yesterday
  - āpō – yesterday
  - ātaeao – tomorrow morning

Majority of the lexemes can be used in both position 1 & 2, meaning they can function as nouns and verbs, depending on the context.

== Complements ==
The Tokulauan language makes use of complementizers pe, ke, oi, and ona. The complementizer pe is used for indicative complements, while ke, oi, and ona are used for non-indicative complements.

Pe: Complement used in sentences pertaining to knowledge.

Ko taku fakatatau lava pe na maua lava te vaiaho.
TOP 1sg.POSS guess INT COMP TA obtain INT DET week
'My guess was that a full week had passed.'

Ke: Complement used in sentences pertaining to purpose.

Kua fiu foki ke-iru-au a!
TA fed-up indeed COMP-drink-1sg EXCLAM
'[They] were tired of trying to get me to drink.'

Ona: Complement used in sentences pertaining to "phasal, modal, and commentative predicates."

Kua tatau ono fai he fale.
TA necessary COMP make a house
'It had become necessary to acquire a house'

Oi: Complement used in sentences pertaining to items of sequence.

Kuo toeitiiti oi nofo mai te fetū tēia.
TA be-soon COMP sit DIR DET star DEM
'Very soon that star will be in the ascendant.'

The Tokelauan language also must take into mind the systematics of its complements. There is a bonding hierarchy between the complements and its sentences. According to Hooper's research, there are four elements that in Tokelauan semantics that determine the strength of the bond between the complement and rest of the sentence. In the binding system, the complements act inversely to the verb of the sentence. Therefore, if the strength of the verb is higher on the binding scale, the complement is unlikely to appear as its own separate clause. The four elements are: Subject/agent case marking, Verb modalities, Fusion or co-lexicalization, and Separation.

1. Subject/agent case marking: "'The higher the main verb is on the binding scale, the less likely is the subject/agent of the complement to display the case-marking characteristics of subjects/agents of main clauses.'" (Quoted from Givón)
2. Verb modalities: "'The higher the main verb is on the binding scale, the less likely is the complement verb to display the tense-aspect-modality markings characteristics of main-clause verbs.'" (Quoted from Givón)
3. Fusion or co-lexicalization: "'The higher the main verb is on the binding scale, the more likely is the complement verb to co-lexicalize with the main verb.'" (Quoted from Givón)
4. Separation: "'The higher the main verb is on the binding scale, the less likely it is that a subordinating morpheme would separate the complement clause from the main clause.'" (Quoted from Givón)

== Shifting ==
Tokelauan is a quite free flowing language as the sentence structures can vary greatly. Although there is a preferred method of ordering the phrase (i.e., argument, subject, case complement), the language allows for different variations. There are certain rules when it comes to sentence permutations when it comes to "subject shifting" or "case scrambling." Generally, across these sentence permutations, the parts of speech, such as argument, subject, and case complements, have to stay together. Meaning, the argument is one section that would shift together and subject is its own unit.

Subject shift:

{na havali} {mai te fale i te auala} {te teine}
argument {case complement} subject
Walked from the house along the road the girl

{na havali} {te teine} {mai te fale i te auala}
argument subject {case complement}
Walked the girl from the house along the road

Case scramble:

{na kai} {te ika} {e au} {i te hiipuni}
{na kai} {e au} {te ika} {i te hiipuni}
{na kai} {e au} {i te hiipuni} {te ika}
All of which still mean, The fish was eaten by me with a spoon.

== Affinities with other languages ==
Tokelauan is mutually intelligible with the Tuvaluan language. Samoan literature is recognised mostly due to the early introduction of Christian Samoan missionaries to which the Samoan language was held as the language of instruction at school and at church. It also has marked similarities to the Niuafo'ou language of Tonga.

== Words and phrases ==
Tokelauan	English
Fanatu au là?	Shall I come too?
Ko toku nena e i Nukunonu.	My grandmother lives in Nukunonu.
Malo ni, ea mai koe?	Hello, how are you?
Ko ai tō igoa?	What is your name?
Fakafeiloaki	Greetings
Mālo ni!	Hello
Ulu tonu mai	Welcome
E fakafeiloaki atu	We greet you
Fakafetai	Thank you
Tōfā ni	Good bye
Te malie o te meakai	The food is delicious.

== Numbers ==
Tokelauan (Fuainūmela)	English	Number
Hēai / Helo / Kole	Zero	0
Tahi	One	1
Lua	Two	2
Tolu	Three	3
Fā	Four	4
Lima	Five	5
Ono	Six	6
Fitu	Seven	7
Valu	Eight	8
Iva	Nine	9
Hefulu	Ten	10

Tokelauan (Fuainūmela)	English	Number
Hefulutahi	Eleven	11
Hefululua	Twelve	12
Hefulutolu	Thirteen	13
Hefulufā	Fourteen	14
Hefululima	Fifteen	15
Hefuluono	Sixteen	16
Hefulufitu	Seventeen	17
Hefuluvalu	Eighteen	18
Hefuluiva	Nineteen	19
Luahefulu	Twenty	20

Tokelauan (Fuainūmela)	English	Number
Toluhefulu	Thirty	30
Fāhefulu	Forty	40
Limahefulu	Fifty	50
Onohefulu	Sixty	60
Fituhefulu	Seventy	70
Valuhefulu	Eighty	80
Ivahefulu	Ninety	90
Helau	One Hundred	100

Tokeualuan (Fuainūmela)	English	Number
Tahi te afe /Afe	One Thousand	1000
Lua te afe / Luaafe	Two Thousand	2000
Tolu te afe / Toluafe	Three Thousand	3000
Fā te afe / Fāafe	Four Thousand	4000
Lima te afe / Limaafe	Five Thousand	5000

== Kinship terms ==
The Tokelau kinship terms are used to define family organizations within the community. Tokelau has adopted the Hawaiian-type kinship system and modified distinctions in sibling terms. The language has specific words for different members of the family, and some of these terms have multiple meanings.

=== Terms ===
There are three terms that showcase the distinction of same-sex and opposite-sex sibling terms: Sibling of own sex (male or female); sibling of opposite sex (male); and sibling of opposite sex, (female). For example, 'mother's sister,' 'male cousin's brother' and 'sister's nephew' are all different terms in the Tokelauan language. In Tokelau, the term most closely translated to "incest" is holi kāiga which is made up of two words: holi meaning 'to tread' and also 'to desecrate' or 'violate'. The word Kāiga means 'kinship'. The term holi kāiga can be applied to not only a 'desecration of kinship' but in any cases that the order of kinship is changed, for example a child defying an elder. The most common use of the term, however, is used when speaking about the sexual contact between individuals. In the Tokelauan language, Kāiga has both adjectival and nominal linguistic functions:

- e kāiga ki mā 'we two are related'
- ko īa he kāiga e o oku 'he/she is a kinsman of mine'
- i nā aho iēnā nae hē lahi nā kāiga 'in those days there were not many kingroups'

When the word is used nominally, it may imply a diverse variety of social units that all have a shared ancestor. The Tokelau language contains terms for affinal relationships, however, there is no single word that can be transcribed as 'affinity'. The term opposite of kāiga ('kin' or 'related') is he kāiga ('not kin' or 'unrelated'), and that only those who are he kāiga should be wedded. Violating the kinship relationship means breaching not only the current relationship but the whole kinship of all descendants.

== Language endangerment ==
With fewer than 5000 speakers, the Tokelauan language is endangered. There is a struggle to teach a language that is spoken by only handful of people, when learning a widely known language such as English has a much greater benefit in their society. The heritage language of the community starts to diminish as parents stray away from teaching their children the local language, in hopes that they will succeed in learning the more dominant language, and as Tokelauan speakers intermarry with non-speakers. Older generations of people living in Tokelau speak both Tokelauan and Samoan, but the younger generation, due to the newer schooling system, are apt to speak English rather than Samoan. In a census in 2001 in New Zealand, only 44 percent of the people with a Tokelauan background could hold a conversation in the language, compared to 53 percent in 1996. Comparably, a meager 29 percent of New Zealand-born Tokelauans reported being able to speak the language, compared to the 71 percent born in the three atolls.

== See also ==
- Tokelau, Tuvalu § Linguistic background
- Nukuoro language
