= Nukunonu =

Atoll in Tokelau

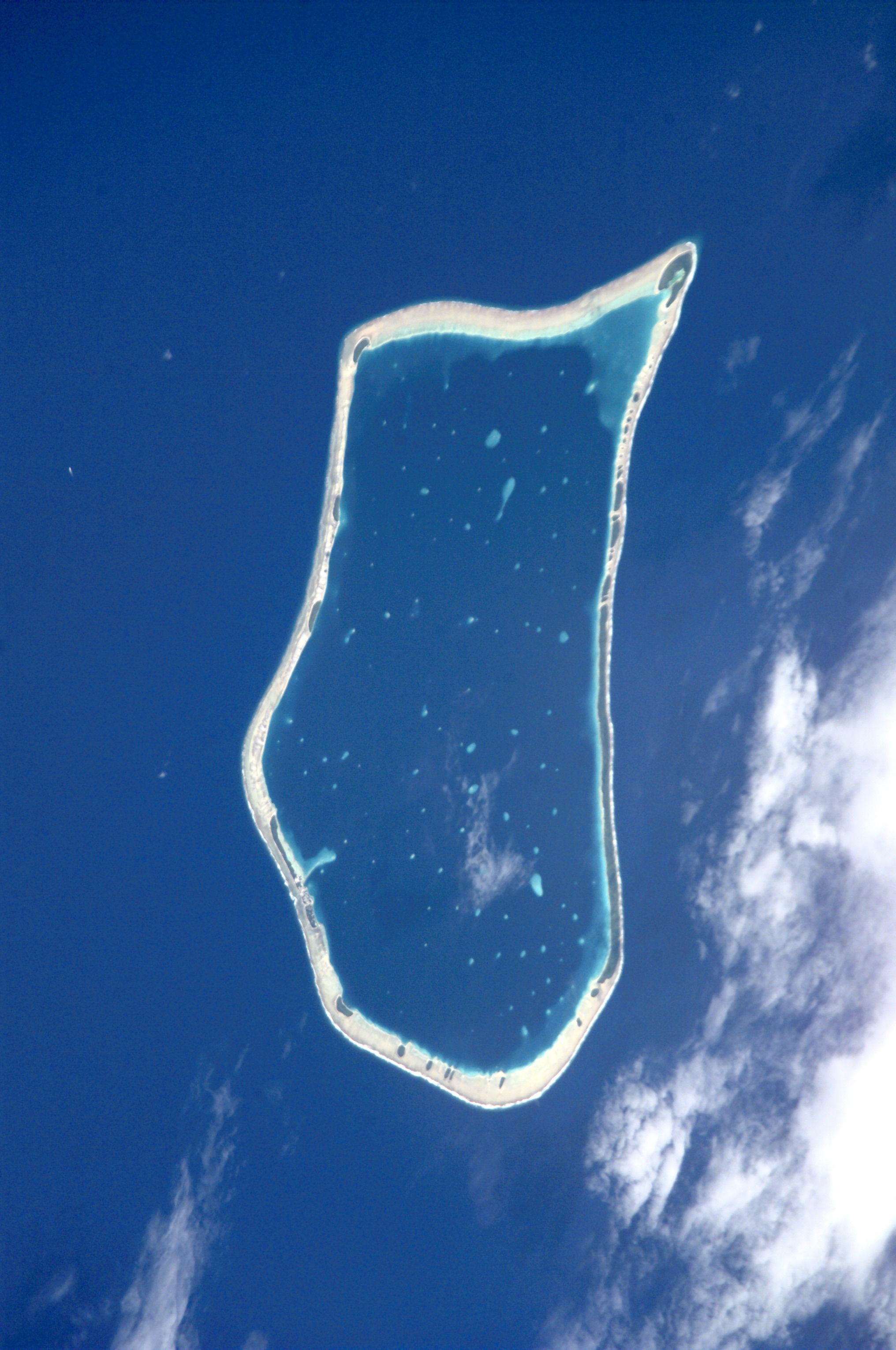
- Satellite image of Nukunonu

- Location of Nukunonu Atoll Nukunonu (Oceania) Nukunonu (Pacific Ocean)

Geography
- Archipelago: Tokelau
- Total islands: 30
- Area: 5.5 km^{2} (2.1 sq mi)

Administration
- New Zealand
- Dependent territory: Tokelau
- Largest settlement: Nokunonu Village
- Faipule (leader): Alapati Tavite
- Pulenuku (mayor): Petelo Patelesio

Demographics
- Population: 531
- Languages: Tokelauan, English

Nukunonu, formerly known as Duke of Clarence Island, is the largest atoll within Tokelau, a dependency of New Zealand in the south Pacific Ocean. It comprises 30 islets surrounding a central lagoon, with about 5.5 km^{2} (2.1 sq mi) of land area and a lagoon surface area of 109 km^{2} (42 sq mi). Motuhaga is the only islet that has inhabitants. It has an estimated population of 531.

== History ==
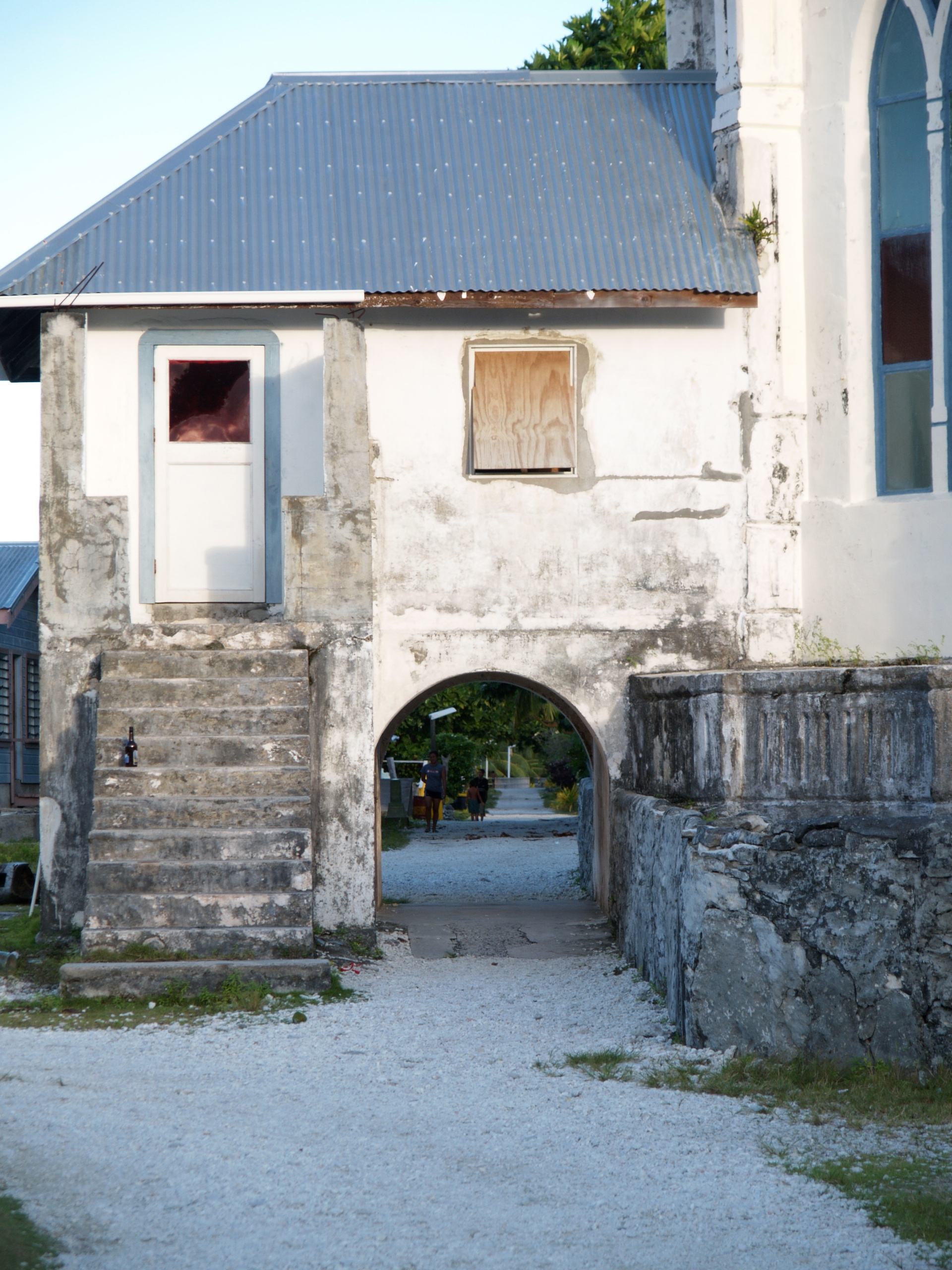
An arch straddling the main street supports the nave of the Nukunonu Church, a Catholic Church

The first European vessel known to have come upon Nukunonu was the Royal Navy ship HMS Pandora, in 1791, whose captain, Edward Edwards, named Duke of Clarence Island in honour of Prince William, Duke of Clarence and St Andrews (1765-1837), the third son of King George III and later king himself, as William IV. At the time, the Pandora was searching for mutineers from HMS Bounty. During the early 19th century, Nukunonu's inhabitants were converted to Roman Catholicism by Samoan missionaries.

In 1859, the U.S. Guano Company claimed Duke of Clarence along with a number of other Tokelauan atolls under the U.S. Guano Islands Act. The U.S. State Department bonded the claim in 1860. However, many of these islands were not worked by the company and in 1889 they were claimed by Great Britain as part of the Union Islands. In 1916, the Union Islands were annexed to the Gilbert and Ellice Islands colony and then, in 1925, reassigned to the Dominion of New Zealand under the administration of Territory of Western Samoa. In 1979, as part of the Treaty of Tokehega, the U.S. formally renounced its prior claim on Nukunonu and the other Tokelauan islands now under New Zealand sovereignty, and a maritime boundary between Tokelau and American Samoa was established.

== Demography ==
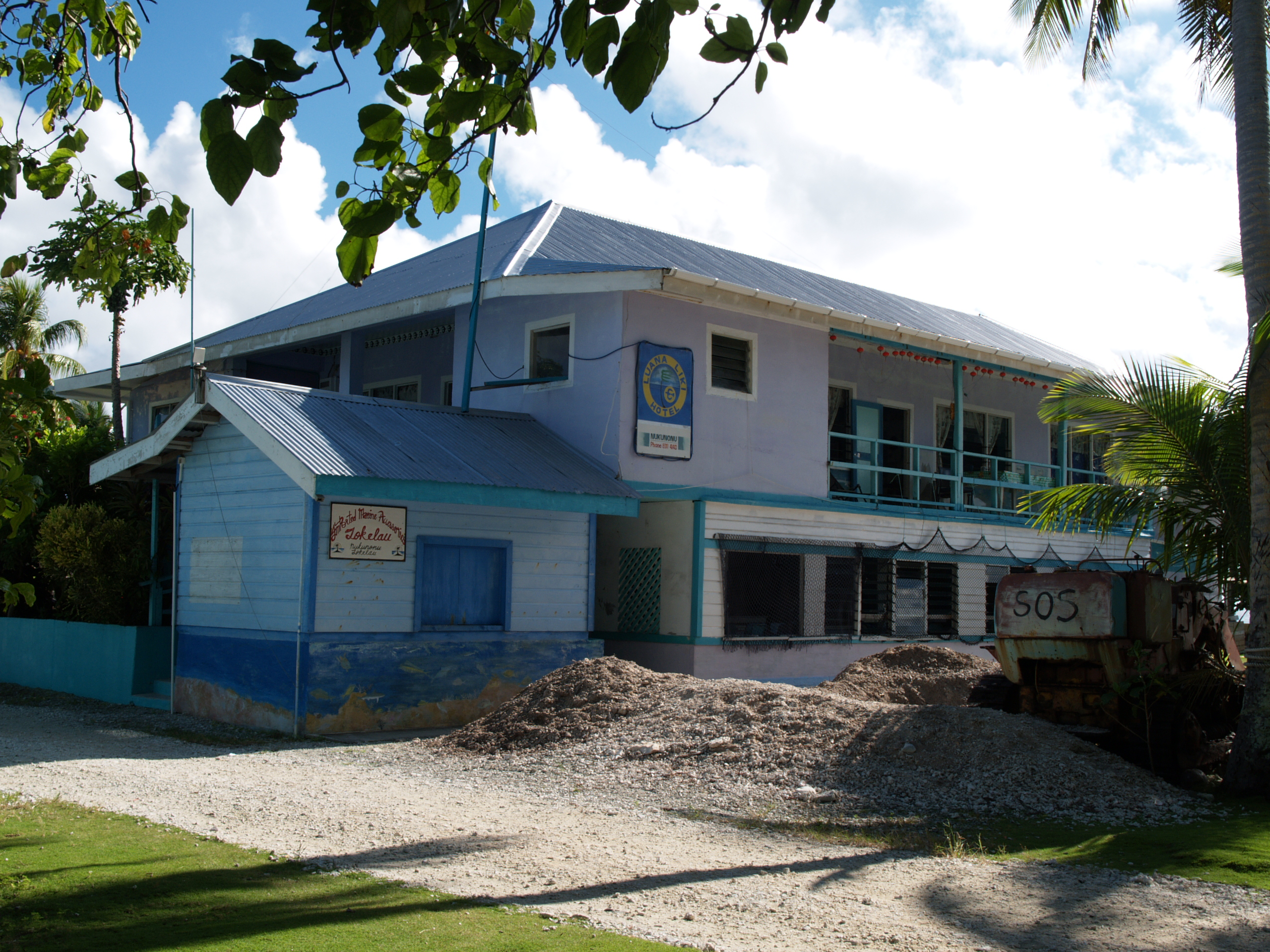
The Luana Liki Hotel

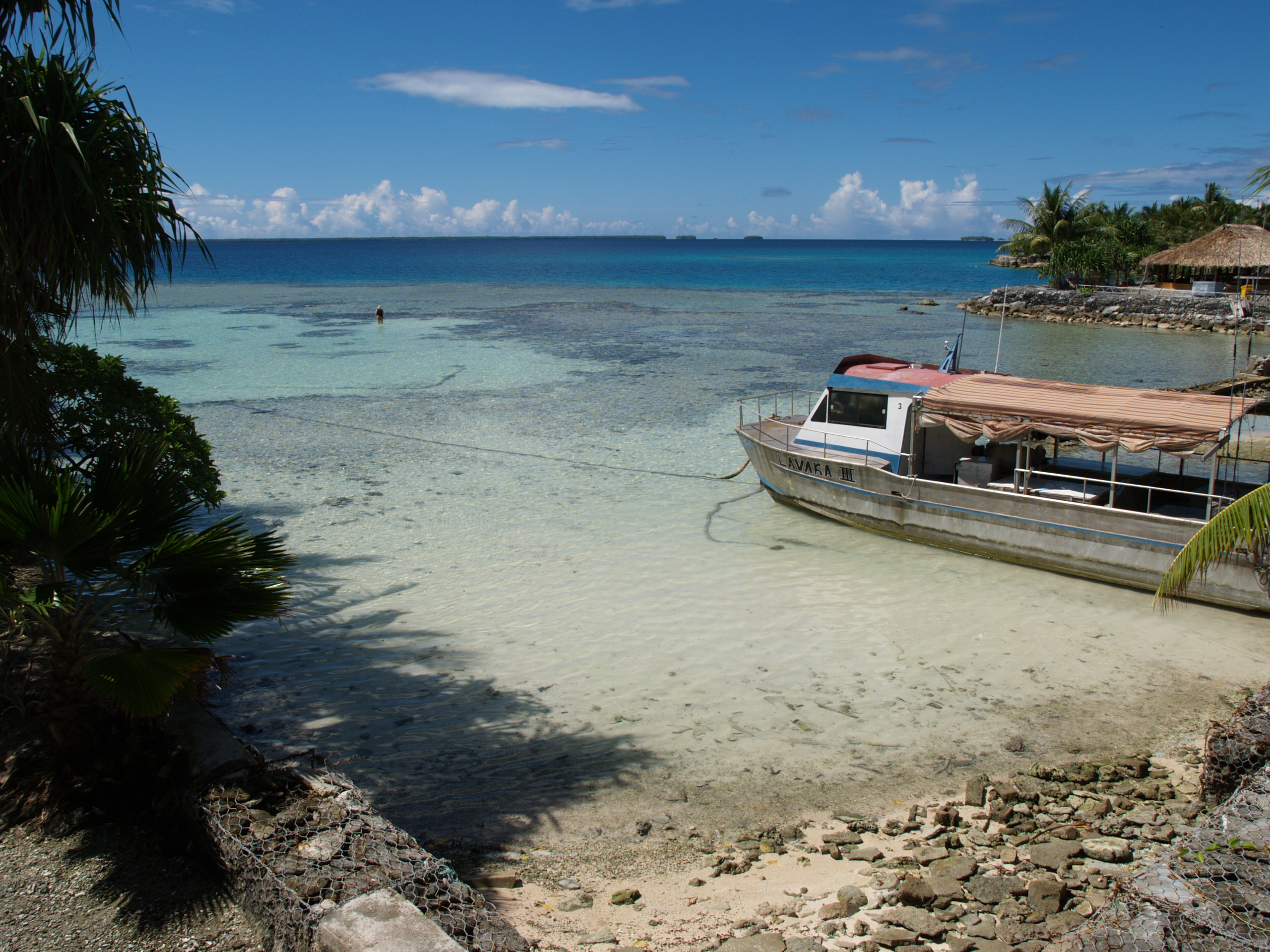
The lagoon

The main settlement on the atoll is located on Nukunonu Island at the southwestern edge of the lagoon with a concrete bridge joining the two areas of settlement. The island's residents depend upon coconuts, pandanus, and marine life for subsistence. Fresh water is scarce; concrete water tanks are incorporated into the bases of newly built houses to collect rainwater from the roofs. Shipping is hampered by the lack of an adequate anchorage. Satellite TV dishes are beginning to appear on some houses in the village.

Tokelau has one hotel, the Luana Liki Hotel, and one resort, Falefa Resort, both situated on Nukunonu. Few tourists visit the country and tourism is not widely promoted. There is ambivalence about tourism, with some Tokelauans wanting to keep the country unaffected by the outside world. Despite this, visitors are greeted with traditional Polynesian hospitality. The Luana Liki Hotel functions mainly to accommodate official visitors, which have included the New Zealand Prime Minister and Governor General. There is one main shop in Nukunonu which sells a limited range of products. Due to the vagaries of shipping schedules, it is at times short of goods.

Local administration consists of a Taupulega (Council of Elders), made up of heads of family groups and two elected members. According to the 2006 census 426 people live on Nukunonu, of which more than 95% belong to the Catholic Church.

The most recent population count of 2019 found the population at 531.

== Environment ==
=== Important Bird Area ===
Some 60 ha of the eastern side of the atoll has been designated an Important Bird Area (IBA) by BirdLife International because the site supports breeding colonies of brown and black noddies and common white terns, with about 20,000 breeding pairs estimated in 2011.

== Economy ==
Coconut (Cocos nucifera) is an important food source here. The Black Rat (Rattus rattus) arrived with European exploration and can take 50% of the yield, but the native Polynesian Rat (R. exulans) will do the same amount of damage anywhere the Black Rat has not become dominant. Rodent control and research on rodent control are important to deal with the problem.

== Islands ==
- Avakaukilikili 9.1135°S 171.7845°W
- Matalapa
- Niualemu
- Hini Ailani
- Te Palaoa
- Apia 9.1269°S 171.7889°W
- Haumagalu
- Niututahi 9.1297°S 171.7894°W
- Lalohumu
- Olomoana
- Tuigaika
- Tima
- Vaivaimai
- Te Nonu
- Patiku
- Tuatiga
- Tagamako
- Hilakehe
- Na Taulaga
- Punalei 9.2157°S 171.7703°W
- Motu Fala
- Motu Akea
- Fulumahaga
- Na Hapiti
- Fatigauhu 9.2265°S 171.8092°W
- Te Afua o lafu
- Te Puka i Mua 9.2177°S 171.8333°W
- Motuhaga 9.2033°S 171.8460°W
- Te Kamu 9.1578°S 171.8594°W
- Fakanava Tau Loto
- Vini
- Te Puka i Muli
- Te Fakanava 9.1486°S 171.8584°W

== See also ==
- List of Guano Island claims
- List of islands of Tokelau
