= 2008 Tokelauan general election =

- 17–19 January 2008

All 20 seats in the General Fono
Trio of Ulu-o-Tokelau before election
Kuresa Nasau
Kolouei O'Brien
Pio Tuia
Trio of Ulu-o-Tokelau after election
Kuresa Nasau
Foua Toloa
Pio Tuia

Parliamentary elections were held in Tokelau on 17 January, 18 January and 19 January 2008 to elect the 20 members of the General Fono. The elections saw Kolouei O'Brien replaced as faipule of Fakaofo by Foua Toloa.

== Results ==
=== 6th Government (2008–2010) ===
Atoll	Position	Name
Atafu	Faipule	Kuresa Nasau (Ulu for 2010)
Atafu	Pulenuku	Nouata Tufoua
Fakaofo	Faipule	Foua Toloa (Ulu for 2009)
Fakaofo	Pulenuku	Tinielu Tuumuli
Nukunonu	Faipule	Pio Tuia (Ulu for 2008)
Nukunonu	Pulenuku	Lino Isaia
Source: Government of Tokelau

== See also ==
- Administrator of Tokelau
- Council for the Ongoing Government of Tokelau
