= 2023 New Zealand electoral calendar =

2023 elections in New Zealand

This is a list of elections that have been and will be held in New Zealand and associated states and territories in 2023. Included are any local or national elections or by-elections, as well as elections to iwi governing bodies, and any party leadership votes.

== Overview of key electoral events ==
=== General elections ===
| Date | Jurisdiction | Government before | Head of government before | Government after | Head of government after |
|---|---|---|---|---|---|
| 26 January | Tokelau | 10th Government | Kelihiano Kalolo | 11th Government | Kelihiano Kalolo |
| 26 January | Tokelau | 10th Government | Esera Fofō Tuisano | 11th Government | Esera Fofō Tuisano |
| 26 January | Tokelau | 10th Government | Siopili Perez | 11th Government | Alapati Tavite |
| 29 April | Niue | 1st Tagelagi Ministry | Dalton Tagelagi | 2nd Tagelagi Ministry | Dalton Tagelagi |
| 14 October | New Zealand | Labour (C&S: Green) (71 / 120) | Chris Hipkins | National–ACT–NZ First (68 / 123) | Christopher Luxon |

=== Party leadership votes ===
| Date | Party | Role | Person before | Person after | Support | Voters |
|---|---|---|---|---|---|---|
| 22 January | Labour | Leader | Jacinda Ardern | Chris Hipkins | Unopposed | Electoral college |
| 8–9 July | Green | Co-leaders | James Shaw | James Shaw | >75% | Green local branch delegates |
| 8–9 July | Green | Co-leaders | Marama Davidson | Marama Davidson | >75% | Green local branch delegates |

== January to March ==
- 22 January: Labour Party leadership election following resignation of Jacinda Ardern
- 26 January: Tokelauan general election

== April to June ==
- 29 April: Niuean general election

== July to September ==
- 8–9 July: Confirmation vote of Green Party co-leaders held at their AGM per party constitution

== October to December ==
- 14 October: New Zealand general election

== See also ==
- 2023 in New Zealand
