= 2020 Tokelauan general election =

- 23 January 2020

All 20 seats in the General Fono
Trio of Ulu-o-Tokelau before election
Kelihiano Kalolo
Afega Gaualofa
Siopili Perez
Trio of Ulu-o-Tokelau after election
Kelihiano Kalolo
Esera Fofō Tuisano
Siopili Perez

General elections were held in Tokelau on 23 January 2020.

== Electoral system ==
The General Fono consists of a faipule (representative) and a pulenuku (village mayor) elected in each of the three villages (Atafu, Fakaofo and Nukunonu). Each village also elects one delegate for every 100 residents. All elections in Atafu and Fakaofo took place under a two-round system, where if no candidate obtains over 50% of the vote, the top two move on to a runoff election to decide the winner. If there were multiple delegates elected in a village, majority-at-large voting was used. Nukunonu elections took place under traditional rules, where election arrangements were managed and conducted autonomously according to each village Taupulega.

== Results ==
Position	Atafu members	Fakaofo members	Nukunonu members
Faipule	Kelihiano Kalolo	Esera Fofō Tuisano	Siopili Perez
Pulenuku	Faamanuia Tamoa	Mose Pelasio	Lino Isaia
Taupulega Representatives (Village Elders)	Sirila Enosa	Kaio Isaako	Peato Pelenato
Taupulega Representatives (Village Elders)	Stanley Lopa	Tinielu Tuʻumuli	Alapati Tavite
Taupulega Representatives (Village Elders)	Teloloma Paulo		Pafelio Tumua
Fatupaepae Representatives (Council of Women)	Latu Lopa	Hina Kele	Lepeka Amato
Fatupaepae Representatives (Council of Women)	Latu Lopa	Malia Pue	Lepeka Amato
Taulelea/Aumaga Representatives (Men's Group)	Nofo Iupati	Tofiga Teao	Havelio Tumua
Taulelea/Aumaga Representatives (Men's Group)	Nofo Iupati	Aokuso Vavega	Havelio Tumua
Source: Radio New Zealand
