= Council for the Ongoing Government of Tokelau =

Executive body in Tokelau

Coordinates: 13.8277°S 171.7585°W

The Council for the Ongoing Government of Tokelau is the executive body in Tokelau. It serves as the governing organization for Tokelau when the General Fono is not in session. The council has six members, consisting of the faipule (leader) and pulenuku (village mayor) of each of the three atolls, Fakaofo, Nukunonu, and Atafu. It was established in November 2003, replacing the Council of Faipule, which had been established in 1993 and had three members – the three faipule.

== Current council ==
The 12th Government comprises:

Atoll	Position	Name	Ministerial portfolios
Atafu	Faipule	Kelihiano Kalolo	Education; Climate Change
Atafu	Pulenuku	Malala Lafaialii	Economic Development, Natural Resources and Environment
Fakaofo	Faipule	Esera Fofō Tuisano	Transport & Support Services; Energy
Fakaofo	Pulenuku	Feleti Tulafono	Fisheries
Nukunonu	Faipule	Alapati Pita Tavite	Ulu-o-Tokelau for 2026; Finance; Health; As Ulu: Justice; Foreign Affairs; NGOs; Public Service; Office of the Council for the Ongoing Government
Nukunonu	Pulenuku	Petelo Patelesio	Telecommunications

== Past governments ==
11th Government (2023-2026)

Atoll	Position	Name
Atafu	Faipule	Kelihiano Kalolo (Ulu for 2023)
Atafu	Pulenuku	Nofo Iupati
Fakaofo	Faipule	Esera Fofō Tuisano (Ulu for 2025)
Fakaofo	Pulenuku	O'tinielu Tuumuli
Nukunonu	Faipule	Alapati Tavite (Ulu for 2024)
Nukunonu	Pulenuku	Petelo Patelesio

10th Government (2020–2022)

Atoll	Position	Name	
Atafu	Faipule	Kelihiano Kalolo (Ulu for 2021)	
Atafu	Pulenuku	Faamanuia Tamoa	
Atafu	Pulenuku		Faafetai Taumanu
Fakaofo	Faipule	Esera Fofō Tuisano (Ulu for 2020)	
Fakaofo	Pulenuku	Mose Pelasio	
Nukunonu	Faipule	Siopili Perez (Ulu for 2022)	
Nukunonu	Pulenuku	Lino Isaia	

9th Government (2017–2019)

Atoll	Position	Name
Atafu	Faipule	Kelihiano Kalolo (Ulu for 2019)
Atafu	Pulenuku	Fano Fao
Fakaofo	Faipule	Afega Gaualofa (Ulu for 2018)
Fakaofo	Pulenuku	Mose Pelasio
Nukunonu	Faipule	Siopili Perez (Ulu for 2017)
Nukunonu	Pulenuku	Petelo Patelesio

8th Government (2014–2016)

Atoll	Position	Name	
Atafu	Faipule	Kuresa Nasau (Ulu for 2014)	
Atafu	Pulenuku	Saili Patea	
Fakaofo	Faipule	Foua Toloa (Note: Toloa retired from the position in late 2014.)	
Fakaofo	Faipule		Afega Gaualofa (Ulu for 2016)
Fakaofo	Pulenuku	Mose Pelasio	
Nukunonu	Faipule	Siopili Perez (Ulu for 2015)	
Nukunonu	Pulenuku	Setefano Sakaria (Note: Sakaria passed away on 30 July 2016.)	
Nukunonu	Pulenuku		Petelo Patelesio

7th Government (2011–2013)

Atoll	Position	Name
Atafu	Faipule	Kelihiano Kalolo (Ulu for 2012)
Atafu	Pulenuku	Faafetai Taumanu
Fakaofo	Faipule	Foua Toloa (Ulu for 2011)
Fakaofo	Pulenuku	Tinielu Tuumuli
Nukunonu	Faipule	Salesio Lui (Ulu for 2013)
Nukunonu	Pulenuku	Setefano Sakaria

6th Government (2008–2010)

Atoll	Position	Name
Atafu	Faipule	Kuresa Nasau (Ulu for 2010)
Atafu	Pulenuku	Nouata Tufoua
Fakaofo	Faipule	Foua Toloa (Ulu for 2009)
Fakaofo	Pulenuku	Tinielu Tuumuli
Nukunonu	Faipule	Pio Tuia (Ulu for 2008)
Nukunonu	Pulenuku	Lino Isaia

5th Government (2005–2007)

Atoll	Position	Name
Atafu	Faipule	Kuresa Nasau (Ulu for 2007)
Atafu	Pulenuku	Iosua Aleni
Fakaofo	Faipule	Kolouei O'Brien (Ulu for 2006)
Fakaofo	Pulenuku	Keli Neemia
Nukunonu	Faipule	Pio Tuia (Ulu for 2005)
Nukunonu	Pulenuku	Sakalia Vaha Tavite

4th Government (2002–2004)

Atoll	Position	Name
Atafu	Faipule	Patuki Isaako (Ulu for 2004)
Atafu	Pulenuku	Paulo Kitiona
Fakaofo	Faipule	Kolouei O'Brien (Ulu for 2003)
Fakaofo	Pulenuku	Keli Neemia
Nukunonu	Faipule	Pio Tuia (Ulu for 2002)
Nukunonu	Pulenuku	Setefano Sakaria

== See also ==
- 2020 Tokelauan general election
