= 2020 in Tokelau =

- Decades: 2000s; 2010s; 2020s
- See also: Other events of 2020; Timeline of Tokelauan history

Events from 2020 in Tokelau.

== Incumbents ==
- Administrator: Ross Ardern
- Head of Government: Kerisiano Kalolo

== Events ==
Ongoing – COVID-19 pandemic in Oceania

- 3 April – Even though the territory had no cases, boats arriving from affected countries were banned from landing.
- 19 March – All incoming travel was suspended, except for Tokelauans.
