= 2023 Tokelauan general election =

- 26 January 2023

All 20 seats in the General Fono
Trio of Ulu-o-Tokelau before election
Kelihiano Kalolo
Esera Fofō Tuisano
Siopili Perez
Trio of Ulu-o-Tokelau after election
Kelihiano Kalolo
Esera Fofō Tuisano
Alapati Tavite

A general election was held in Tokelau on 26 January 2023. The previous election was in 2020.

== Electoral system ==
The General Fono consists of a faipule (representative) and a pulenuku (village mayor) elected in each of the three villages (Atafu, Fakaofo and Nukunonu). Each village also elects one delegate for every 100 residents. In total six MPs were elected from Nukunonu, and seven each from Atafu and Fakaofo. Voting uses a majoritarian system in which a candidate needs to obtain over 50% of the vote. If there are multiple delegates elected in a village, majority-at-large voting is used. Unlike previous elections, which saw Nukunonu use a different polling method from the other atolls, this was the first election where all three atolls used the same system.

== Results ==
Position	Atafu members	Fakaofo members	Nukunonu members
Faipule	Kelihiano Kalolo	Esera Fofō Tuisano	Alapati Tavite
Pulenuku	Nogo Iupati	O'tinielu Tuumuli	Petelo Patelesio
Taupulega Representatives (Village elders)	Lepaio Lua	Kaio Isaako	Falaniko Aloisio
Taupulega Representatives (Village elders)	Tiu Faō	Tuutuuvae Sefo Ateri	Salesio Lui
Taupulega Representatives (Village elders)	Tulano Toloa	Taupati Peleni	
Taulelea Representatives (Men's group)	Tepapa Tom Toma	Palelei Famatala Sili	Savelio Tumua
Fafine Representatives (Women's group)	Latu Kuresa	Malia Sugalu Puē	Lupe Josephine Lui
Source: Radio New Zealand

No elections were held for the Taupulega seats for Fakaofo as only three candidates were nominated for the three seats available.

Members of the fono and ministers were sworn in on 13 March 2023.
