= Foua Toloa =

Tokelauan politician

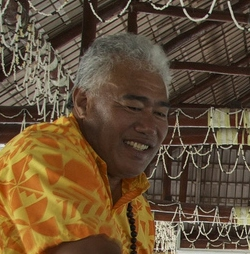

Head of the Government of Tokelau (Ulu)
- In office 21 February 2011 – 21 February 2012?
- Preceded by: Kuresa Nasau
- Succeeded by: Kerisiano Kalolo
- In office 21 February 2009 – 21 February 2010
- Preceded by: Pio Tuia
- Succeeded by: Kuresa Nasau
- Constituency: Fakaofo

Faipule of Fakaofo
- Incumbent
- Assumed office ?

Personal details
- Born: Fakaofo
- Died: 23 June 2015 California, U.S.

Foua Toloa (died 23 June 2015) was a Tokelauan politician who served as the Head of the Government of Tokelau, or Ulu, from 21 February 2009, to 21 February 2010. He was a member of the Council for the Ongoing Government of Tokelau, and was a faipule on Fakaofo. As the office of Ulu rotates on an annual basis, Toloa resumed office on 21 February 2011. For a time in 2011-2012, he was also Tokelau's minister for Finance, Telecommunication, Energy and Transport.

Toloa went to high school in Samoa, then studied at the University of the South Pacific's Alafua campus, earning a degree in tropical agriculture. He returned to work in Tokelau, becoming Director of Agriculture and Fisheries. He was elected to the faipule in the 2008 Tokelauan general election.

== Head of Government ==
During a trip to Tokelauan communities of New Zealand in September 2009, Toloa advocated a return to observer representation in the Tokelau Fono for Tokelauans living overseas. Toloa stated that bringing back representation for Tokelauans abroad would allow the diaspora to contribute to decisions important to the future of their homeland. Toloa noted that it would be possible for overseas representatives to meet in Apia, Samoa, rather than Tokelau for easier travel. "Every General Fono once or twice a year they would come in as representatives to the General Fono, not as delegates but as observers and they can voice their opinion in terms of issues that are discussed with the General Fono, but when it comes to the voting, they are not allowed to vote." Toloa’s visit to New Zealand was part of a series of discussions with Tokelauan communities living in New Zealand and Australia.

Ulu Toloa expressed disappointment with New Zealand Prime Minister John Key and the leaders of other developed countries for prioritizing economic concerns over the reduction of carbon emissions at the 2009 APEC summit in Singapore. World leaders at the APEC meeting failed to set a specific target for the reduction of greenhouse gas emissions and, instead, called for an "ambitious outcome" at the December 2009 United Nations Climate Change Conference in Copenhagen.

Toloa criticised Prime Minister Key for placing pressing economic concerns ahead environmental issues, including the long-term survival of small island states. Toloa told Radio New Zealand International, "That the impact on nations such as ours threatens our livelihood and existence as a people, I think the Prime Minister understood our position and stated as much. However, in the mix of things it would seem that other priorities such as establishing a free trade policy to promote new economic growth takes precedent [sic] at this time."

In November 2011, Toloa, as Head of Government of Tokelau, became a founding member of the Polynesian Leaders Group, a regional grouping intended to cooperate on a variety of issues including culture and language, education, responses to climate change, and trade and investment.

In December 2011, at the 2011 United Nations Climate Change Conference in Durban, Toloa announced that Tokelau would, in 2012, "switch entirely to renewable energy", as it would "switch off its old diesel generators and be powered by a $7.5m solar PV system designed to provide 90% of its energy. The rest will come from home-made coconut oil". He urged the rest of the world to move towards renewable energy in like manner.

After the end of his term as Ulu, Toloa served as Minister for Finance, Telecommunications, Energy and Transport. He was sacked in June 2012 "after New Zealand’s Foreign Minister, Murray McCully, had indicated he couldn’t work with him". The dispute derived from the "dilapidated" MV Tokelau, the ship serving as Tokelau's link to the outside world. McCully considered it not to be seaworthy, but Toloa insisted it should continue to be used. Ulu Kerisiano Kalolo dismissed Toloa, and the MV Tokelau was replaced with a newer ship, the PB Matua.

Toloa was the only faipule reelected in the 2014 election.

Foua Toloa died in the U.S. state of California on 23 June 2015.
