= Atene Kalolo =

First Lady of Tokelau

Atene Kalolo is the First Lady of Tokelau and is President of the Atafu Women's Council. In 2019, she gave the opening speech at a summit in Tokelau aimed at empowering women to enter politics. She is married to the Ulu o Tokelau, Kelihiano Kalolo. They have two sons, one daughter and fifteen grandchildren.
