= Politics of Tokelau =

New Zealand's current four-year plan for Tokelau, drafted October 2021

The politics of Tokelau takes place within a framework of a parliamentary representative democracy that is a dependent territory of New Zealand. The head of state of Tokelau is King Charles III in right of New Zealand. An administrator (as of 2026, Andre van der Walt) is appointed by the New Zealand Minister of Foreign Affairs and Trade to represent the New Zealand Government.

The Ulu-o-Tokelau is the head of government and presides over the Council for the Ongoing Government of Tokelau, which functions as a cabinet. The office of Ulu rotates between the three faipule for a one-year term. The current Ulu is Alapati Tavite. The Council consists of the faipule (leader) and pulenuku (village mayor) of each of the three atolls.

The Tokelau Amendment Act of 1996 confers legislative power on the General Fono, a unicameral body. The number of seats each atoll receives in the Fono is determined by population – currently Fakaofo and Atafu each have seven and Nukunonu has six. Faipule and pulenuku also sit in the Fono.

== Self-determination ==
On 11 November 2004, Tokelau and New Zealand took steps to formulate a treaty that would transform Tokelau from a New Zealand territory to an entity that is in free association with New Zealand. Besides drafting a treaty, a United Nations-sponsored "act of self-determination" had to take place. The referendum, supervised by the UN, started on 11 February 2006 and finished on 15 February 2006. Although a 60% majority voted in favour of the proposal, a two-thirds majority was required for the referendum to succeed, so Tokelau remained a New Zealand territory. In June 2006, Kolouei O'Brien announced that the Fono had agreed to hold another referendum. This second referendum took place between 20 and 24 October 2007 and again fell short of the two-thirds majority required for independence, with 64% voting in favour. In April 2008, speaking as leader of the National Party, future New Zealand Prime Minister John Key stated that New Zealand had "imposed two referenda on the people of the Tokelau Islands" and questioned "the accepted wisdom that small states should undergo a de-colonisation process".

== Executive branch ==
=== Administrator of Tokelau ===
The Administrator of Tokelau is appointed by the New Zealand Government and is the head of the executive branch of Tokelau. Since 1994, however, most powers relating to the day-to-day functions of the government have been transferred to institutions which are chosen by the Tokelauan people. A notable exception is the administration of Tokelau's exclusive economic zone.

Since June 2026, the current Administrator is Andre van der Walt, who "has previously served as New Zealand’s High Commissioner to Kiribati, and as Deputy High Commissioner to Niue".

=== Ulu-o-Tokelau ===
The Ulu-o-Tokelau (or Ulu) is the titular head of government and chairs the Council for the Ongoing Government. The office rotates among the three faipule (atoll leaders) each year and the seat of government changes to the atoll of the incumbent Ulu. As of March 2026, the Ulu is Alapati Tavite.

=== Council for the Ongoing Government ===
The Office of the Council for the Ongoing Government of Tokelau (OCOG) is tasked with managing Tokelau's foreign affairs, providing support and advice to national leaders, and working with villages to develop and implement national programs and activities. The OCOG is based in Apia, Samoa. The OCOG also links together the traditional village-based governing structure and the national government.

Members of the OCOG are the three faipule and three pulenuku (mayors). Members meet while the General Fono is out of session to continue governing the islands.

== Legislative branch ==
The legislative branch of the Tokelau government is the General Fono. It is composed of twenty seats allocated among the three atolls based on population. In 2008, Atafu received seven seats while Fakaofo and Nukunonu each received six.

The General Fono meets for three session per year, with each session lasting around four days. Members of the General Fono elect their Chairman.

The Tokelau Amendment Act, passed by the New Zealand Parliament in 1996, granted the General Fono the ability to pass laws which helped maintain "the peace, order, and good government of Tokelau", including the ability to levy taxes. New Zealand law does not automatically apply to Tokelau, and any bill seeking to be applied in Tokelau must specifically extend its authority to the islands. No law passed by the New Zealand Parliament has ever been extended to Tokelau without Tokelauan consent.

== Elections ==
Elections are held in Tokelau every three years. Voters choose members of the General Fono, one faipule for each atoll, and one pulenuku for each atoll. The 2026 Tokelauan general election was held on 5 February 2026.

== See also ==
- Constitutional history of Tokelau
