= Esera Fofō Tuisano =

Tokelauan politician

Aliki Faipule Esera Fofō Tuisano

28th & 33rd Ulu-o-Tokelau
- In office 17 March 2025 – 9 March 2026
- Administrator: Don Higgins
- Preceded by: Alapati Tavite
- In office 9 March 2020 – 8 March 2021
- Administrator: Ross Ardern
- Preceded by: Kelihiano Kalolo
- Succeeded by: Kelihiano Kalolo

Faipule of Fakaofo
- Incumbent
- Assumed office 9 March 2020
- Preceded by: Afega Gaualofa

Member of the General Fono
- Incumbent
- Assumed office 9 March 2020
- Preceded by: Afega Gaualofa

Aliki Esera Fofō Filipo Tuisano is a Tokelauan politician serving as the current Faipule of Fakaofo since March 2020. He has also served as the 28th & 33rd Ulu-o-Tokelau (head of government of Tokelau) from March 2020 to March 2021, and again from 17 March 2025 to 9 March 2026.

== Biography ==
Tuisano is from the island of Fakaofo, part of Tokelau. He is married. Prior to entering politics, he was active in the Pacific Regional Environment Programme (SPREP). In 2020, he ran for election as part of the 2020 Tokelauan general election to be the Faipule of his island and was elected, succeeding Afega Gaualofa and also becoming a member of the General Fono – the Tokelauan parliament.

Although only just elected his island's Faipule, Tuisano was named the Ulu-o-Tokelau (head of government of Tokelau) for the one-year term from March 2020 to March 2021. Working with Administrator Ross Ardern, Tuisano's term was marked by the territory's response to the COVID-19 pandemic. At the end of his term, he noted that "2020 has been a challenging year. I had only been elected for the first time as Faipule of Fakaofo and straight to the Ulu of Tokelau office in a global pandemic year that changed the norm for most countries in the world including Tokelau. It has been a difficult year but we successfully repatriated over 100 of our families back to Tokelau and held on to be one of the few countries in the world that is free of COVID-19."

In March 2021, Tuisano was succeeded as Ulu-o-Tokelau by Kelihiano Kalolo. He was re-elected Faipule and to the General Fono in 2023, being named the minister of transport and support services and minister of energy.

In March 2025, Tuisano succeeded Alapati Tavite to again become Ulu.

Tuisano was re-elected as faipule of Fakaofo in 2026.
