= Tinielu Tuumuli =

Tokelauan politician

Tinielu Tuumuli is a politician from Tokelau. He has been a member of the Council for the Ongoing Government of Tokelau as the pulenuku of Fakaofo since the 2023 election, as well as previously between 2008 and 2013.

In 2017 he objected to the removal of Administrator of Tokelau David Nicholson.
