= Telephone numbers in Tokelau =

Country Code: +690
International Call Prefix: 00

== Landlines ==
The local telephone numbers in the southern Pacific Ocean islands of Tokelau are five digits long with no leading trunk zero. While Tokelau operates a uniform 5-digit numbering system, the first digit of the national significant number historically aligns with specific atolls:

- Atafu Atoll: Uses the digit 2,
- Fakaofo Atoll: Uses the digit 3,
- Nukunonu Atoll: Uses the digit 4.

The numbers were increased from four to five digits in November 2015 by prefixing '2' to the old numbers.

Subscriber numbers: +690 NXXX (where N = 1 to 9 and X = 0 to 9)

Test numbers:

+690 3190 (ring tone only)
+690 5999 (answering machine)
