= Tavite =

Tavite is a given name and surname. Notable people with the name include:

- Tavite Lopeti (born 1998), American rugby union player
- Alapati Tavite (fl. 2017), Tokelau politician
