= Polygamy in Niue =

Niue does not recognize polygamous marriages by civil law nor customary law. The island previously had polygamy, with some thinking its removal was due to the island embracing Christianity.

== History ==
Prior to colonial contact with the British or other European settlers, polygamy on Niue was regularly practiced. This was due to the fact that under Niuean customary law, often families would look to stronger patus (chiefs) for protection, especially in times of war. The patus would often be offered one of the petitoner's daughters to take as an extra wife. Despite polygamy being practiced, it is not recorded that adultery was a common occurrence. Often it was recorded that it was common that great warriors in Niue would have two wives but some would have up to five.

This practice of polygamy was documented as occurring up to 1926. Following the introduction of Christianity to the island by Christian missionaries, polygamy started to phase out in favour of monogamy according to Christian ethics. A law also came in from the Realm of New Zealand, forbidding unmarried, unrelated couples from living together under threat of a fine. This led to a large number of monogamous Christian marriages occurring in order to avoid paying and had an impact on changing Niuean culture away from polygamous marriages towards monogamous ones under Christian morality. Niue became a signatory of the Convention on the Elimination of All Forms of Discrimination Against Women, formally prohibiting polygamy on the island.
