= Fatupaepae =

Matriarch in Tokelau, Oceania

A fatupaepae is a matriarchal senior figure in the culture of Tokelau. Fatupaepae groups are village-level women's organizations in Tokelau, with one such group in each atoll of the island territory: Atafu, Nukunonu, and Fakafo.

According to the Tokelauan government, the title "Fatupaepae" can be literally translated as "Sacred Being," signifying "a mother or a young lady, who has clearly understood that she is the cornerstone of the family, village and nation and has been taught about her responsibilities as a Fatupaepae." They are viewed as the "foundation stone" of their homestead. Historically, these women bore responsibility for equally and fairly distributing resources among their community, and played a central role in decision-making.

The Fatupaepae groups, which evolved from colonial-era Women's Committees, promote economic development and other opportunities for women, among other issues. Their members have expressed concerns around women's health and their access to business and government on the islands.

The groups from the three villages come together to work collaboratively on women's issues. In 2004, 30 representatives from the Fatupaepae gathered as the Tokelau National Women's Council to discuss how to address shared concerns, which led to the development of the National Policy for Women of Tokelau. A further summit was held in 2019.

A Fatupaepae representative from each atoll serves on the territory's governing General Fono.
