= Lino Isaia =

Tokelauan politician

Lino Isaia is a politician from Tokelau. As of 2008, he was a member of the Council for the Ongoing Government of Tokelau as the pulenuku of Nukunonu.

He was re-elected to the General Fono in the 2020 Tokelauan general election.
