= Realm of New Zealand =

Entire area (or realm) in which the King of New Zealand is head of state

The Realm of New Zealand is the area over which the monarch of New Zealand is head of state. The realm is not a federation but is a collection of states and territories united under its monarch. New Zealand is an independent and sovereign state that has one territorial claim in Antarctica (the Ross Dependency) and one dependent territory (Tokelau). The Realm of New Zealand encompasses the three autonomous jurisdictions of New Zealand and its associated states of the Cook Islands and Niue.

The Ross Dependency in Antarctica has no permanent inhabitants, while Tokelau, the Cook Islands and Niue have primarily indigenous populations. The United Nations formally classifies Tokelau as a non-self-governing territory; the Cook Islands and Niue are self-governing. The governor-general of New Zealand represents the monarch throughout the Realm of New Zealand, though the Cook Islands have an additional king's representative.

The four states and territories form an informal currency union but not a customs union; each is in its own customs zone.

== Overview ==
The monarch of New Zealand, represented in situ by the governor-general of New Zealand, is the head of state throughout the Realm of New Zealand. The New Zealand monarchy is unitary throughout all jurisdictions in the realm with the headship of state being a part of all equally. The 1983 Letters Patent Constituting the Office of Governor-General of New Zealand define the exact scope of the realm.

The Pacific islands of the Cook Islands and Niue became New Zealand's first colonies in 1901, and then protectorates. From 1965 the Cook Islands became self-governing, as did Niue from 1974. Tokelau came under New Zealand control in 1925 and remains a non-self-governing territory.

The Ross Dependency comprises that sector of the Antarctic continent between 160° east and 150° west longitude, together with the islands lying between those degrees of longitude and south of latitude 60° south. The British (imperial) government took possession of this territory in 1923 and entrusted it to the administration of New Zealand. Neither Russia nor the United States recognises this claim, and the matter remains unresolved (along with all other Antarctic claims) by the Antarctic Treaty, which serves to mostly smooth over these differences. The area is uninhabited, apart from scientific bases.

New Zealand nationality law treats all parts of the realm equally, so most people born in New Zealand, the Cook Islands, Niue, Tokelau and the Ross Dependency before 2006 are New Zealand citizens. Further conditions apply for those born from 2006 onwards.

The leaders of the four inhabited states and territories meet together at the Realm of New Zealand Leaders' Meeting, first held in 2026.

The locations of New Zealand (with its major and outlying islands annotated), Niue, Tokelau, and the Cook Islands in the South Pacific Ocean. The Ross Dependency in Antarctica is also shaded.

Area	Representative of the King	Head of the government	Legislature	Capital (or largest settlement)	Population (year)	Land area	
Area	Representative of the King	Head of the government	Legislature	Capital (or largest settlement)	Population (year)	km^{2}	sq mi
Sovereign state
New Zealand	Governor-General of New Zealand	Prime Minister	New Zealand Parliament (House of Representatives)	Wellington	5,324,700 (2026)	268,680	103,740
Associated states
Cook Islands	King's Representative	Prime Minister	Cook Islands Parliament	Avarua	15,040 (2021)	236	91
Niue	Governor-General of New Zealand (Note: The Governor-General of New Zealand is also the representative of the King in Niue and the Governor of the Ross Dependency, which is a separate post.)	Prime Minister	Niue Assembly	Alofi	1,681 (2022)	260	100
Dependent territories
Ross Dependency	Governor	N/A	None (Note: Legislation for the Ross Dependency is enacted by the New Zealand Parliament, though practically this is limited due to the Antarctic Treaty System.)	None (Scott Base)	Scott Base: 10–85; McMurdo Station: 200–1,000 (2016–2018; varies according to season)	450,000	170,000
Tokelau	Governor-General of New Zealand	Ulu-o-Tokelau	General Fono	None (Fakaofo)	1,499 (2016)	10	4

== Governor-general ==
The governor-general represents the head of state—Charles III, in his capacity as the monarch of New Zealand—in the area of the realm. Essentially, governors-general take on all the dignities and reserve powers of the head of state. Dame Cindy Kiro took office on 21 October 2021, following the end of Dame Patsy Reddy's term on 28 September 2021.

== Entities within the Realm ==
=== Cook Islands and Niue ===
Locations of New Zealand and associated states: 1. New Zealand; 2. Niue; 3. The Cook Islands

The Cook Islands and Niue are both self-governing states in free association with New Zealand. The details of their free association arrangements are contained in several documents, such as their respective constitutions, the 1983 Exchange of Letters between the governments of New Zealand and the Cook Islands, and the 2001 Joint Centenary Declaration. The New Zealand Parliament is not empowered to unilaterally pass legislation in respect of these states. In foreign affairs and defence issues New Zealand acts on behalf of these countries, but only with their advice and consent.

As the governor-general resides in New Zealand, the Cook Islands Constitution provides for the distinct position of King's Representative. Appointed by the Cook Islands Government, this position is de jure not subordinate to the governor-general and acts as the local representative of the King of New Zealand. The King's Representative to the Cook Islands has been Sir Tom Marsters since 2013.

According to Niue's Constitution of 1974, the governor-general of New Zealand acts as the King's Representative there, and exercises the "executive authority vested in the Crown".

In the Cook Islands and Niue, the New Zealand high commissioner is the diplomatic representative from New Zealand. Catherine Graham is the New Zealand High Commissioner to the Cook Islands, and Helen Tunnah is the New Zealand High Commissioner to Niue.

Regardless of their close relationship with New Zealand, the Cook Islands and Niue both maintain some diplomatic relations in their own names. Both countries maintain high commissions in New Zealand and have New Zealand high commissioners resident in their capitals. In Commonwealth practice, high commissioners represent their governments, rather than the head of state.

=== New Zealand ===
New Zealand is a sovereign state. At the United Nations, the country is identified in the General Assembly as simply "New Zealand", not as the Realm of New Zealand.

New Zealand proper consists of the following island groups:

- the North Island, South Island, Stewart Island, and the neighbouring coastal islands such as the Solander Islands, all contained within the 16 regions of New Zealand;
- the Chatham Islands to the east, contained within the Chatham Islands Territory;
- the Kermadec Islands and the Three Kings Islands to the north and the New Zealand Subantarctic Islands to the south, all outside local authority boundaries and inhabited only by a small number of research and conservation staff;
- the Ross Dependency, which forms a part of Antarctica, according to the New Zealand government, is constitutionally a part of New Zealand. However, New Zealand's claim to this part of Antarctica is recognised by only four other countries. In addition, New Zealand's claim to sovereignty is subject to the Antarctic Treaty, which it signed in 1959.

==== Tokelau ====
Tokelau has a lesser degree of self-government than the Cook Islands and Niue; it has been moving toward free association status. New Zealand's representative in Tokelau is the administrator of Tokelau (since June 2026, Andre van der Walt), who has the power to overturn rules passed by the General Fono (parliament). In referendums conducted in 2006 and 2007 by New Zealand at the United Nations' request, the people of Tokelau failed to reach the two-thirds majority necessary to attain a system of governance with equal powers to that of the Cook Islands and Niue.

== Future of the Realm ==
A 2016 poll showed 59 per cent of the population supported changing New Zealand's system of government from a monarchy to a republic, with a New Zealand resident as head of state. Should New Zealand become a republic, it would retain the Ross Dependency and Tokelau as dependent territories and the Realm of New Zealand would continue to exist without New Zealand, the Ross Dependency and Tokelau. This would not be a legal hurdle to a New Zealand republic as such, and both the Cook Islands and Niue would retain their free association with New Zealand. Rights to abode and citizenship, codified in New Zealand legislation by the Citizenship Act 1977, would not change.

However, a New Zealand republic would present the issue of continued allegiance to the monarch in the Cook Islands and Niue. Thus, a number of options for the future of the Realm of New Zealand exist should New Zealand become a republic with the Cook Islands and Niue either:

- remaining in free association with New Zealand, but retaining the King or Queen as their head of state;
- having the "republican" New Zealand head of state as their head of state and becoming independent states;
- having their own heads of state, but retaining their status of free association with New Zealand.

== See also ==
- Danish Realm
- Kingdom of the Netherlands

== Sources ==
- Quentin-Baxter, Alison; McLean, Janet (2017). This Realm of New Zealand: The Sovereign, the Governor-General, the Crown. Auckland University Press. ISBN 978-1-869-40875-6.
