= MV Tokelau =

Ship of New Zealand

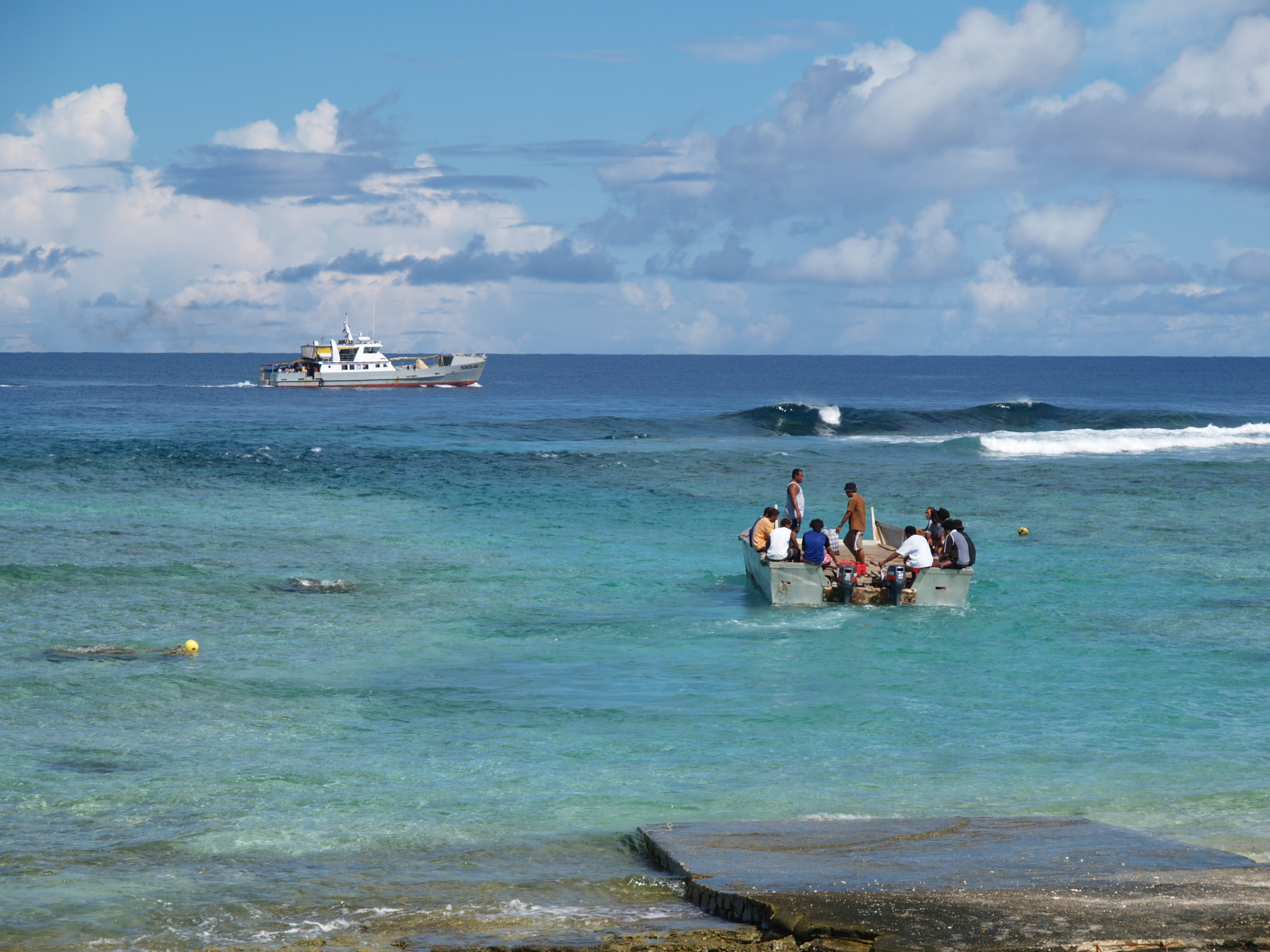
A barge leaves the dock at Nukunonu in Tokelau to collect passengers and cargo from the MV Tokelau.

MV Tokelau was an inter-island ferry which served as Tokelau's main transport connection to the world from 1991 to 2012.

The ship was built in 1991 as a 19m catamaran for use within Tokelau. In 2000 it was converted to a mono-hull and lengthened to 30m in order to run an Apia to Tokelau service.

In 2003 the Tokelau rescued two Tokelauan fishermen missing near Atafu. In 2005 it delivered aid to Tokelau in the aftermath of Cyclone Percy. In 2007 the vessel broke down in Fakaofo and its passengers and cargo had to be transport by the American Samoan government vessel, MV Sili. In 2010 three men drowned when the boat they were using to ferry cargo to the Tokelau capsized in rough seas off Atafu.

Concerns about the ship's age began to be raised in 2006, and the Tokelauan government request the government of New Zealand to purchase a replacement. The request was repeated following the Princess Ashika disaster in 2009. The New Zealand government commissioned a report, but took no other action. In 2012, following a direct appeal from the Ulu-o-Tokelau Kerisiano Kalolo the New Zealand government agreed to fund the construction of a new ferry, and to lease a replacement in the interim. In February 2016 the vessel was replaced by the MV Mataliki.

In 2013 the ship was gifted to the government of Samoa as it was no longer considered fit to ferry passengers. It was operated by the Samoa Shipping Corporation as the MV Pasefika Express to transport passengers and cargo between Upolu and Savai'i until it was sold to a private owner in October 2022.
