= Tokelau Table Tennis Association =

- Sport: Table tennis
- Jurisdiction: Tokelau
- Abbreviation: TTTA
- Founded: 2010
- Affiliation: ITTF
- Affiliation date: 2011
- Regional affiliation: OTTF
- Affiliation date: 2010
- Headquarters: Tokelau
- Secretary: Susan H. Perez

Official website
- www.sportingpulse.com/assoc_page.cgi?c=2-1706-0-0-0
- (Tokelau)

The Tokelau Table Tennis Association was formed on the islands of Tokelau in October 2010. It was the first sport in Tokelau to be granted membership at a Continental or World level. They became the 23rd member of the Oceania Table Tennis Federation.
