= Salesio Lui =

Tokelauan politician

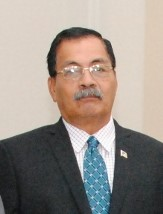
- Lui in 2013

1st & 21st Ulu-o-Tokelau
- In office March 2013 – February 2014
- Preceded by: Kelihiano Kalolo
- Succeeded by: Kuresa Nasau
- In office February 1993 – February 1994
- Succeeded by: Keli Neemia

Personal details
- Born: 1951 (age 74–75)

Salesio Lui (born 1951) is a Tokelauan politician. He was the head of government of Tokelau (Tokelauan: Ulu o Tokelau) from February 1993 to February 1994 and again from 1 March 2013 to 24 February 2014.

For the period of 1990–1996 and 2011–2013, as Faipule (leader) of Nukunonu, he was a member of the Council for the Ongoing Government of Tokelau, and minister for Health and for Support services.

In 1990, Lui was awarded the New Zealand 1990 Commemoration Medal.
