= Alapati Tavite =

Tokelauan politician

Afioga Aliki Faipule Alapati Pita Tavite
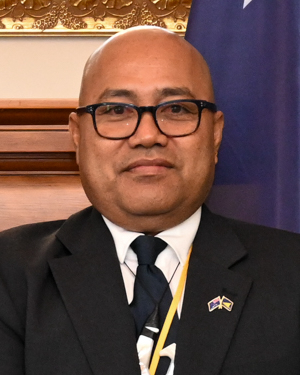
- Tavite in 2024

32nd & 34th Ulu-o-Tokelau
- Incumbent
- Assumed office 9 March 2026
- Administrator: Don Higgins; Andre van der Walt
- Preceded by: Esera Fofō Tuisano
- In office 12 March 2024 – 17 March 2025
- Administrator: Don Higgins
- Preceded by: Kelihiano Kalolo
- Succeeded by: Esera Fofō Tuisano

Faipule of Nukunonu
- Incumbent
- Assumed office 2023
- Preceded by: Siopili Perez

Personal details
- Spouse: Silivia Tavite

Afioga Aliki Faipule Alapati Pita Tavite is a Tokelauan politician serving as the current Ulu-o-Tokelau since 9 March 2026, having previously served in that role from 2024 to 2025. Prior to his tenure as Ulu-o-Tokelau he was elected as taupulega for Nukunonu in 2017 and 2020, and has been the faipule for Nukunonu since 2023. Tavite also led the Ministry of Finance and Ministry of Health and managed Tokelau's response to the COVID-19 pandemic.

== Career ==
Tavite was elected as taupulega, a member of the council of elders, for the atoll of Nukunonu alongside Lino Isaia and Salesio Lui in the 2017 election. He was reelected alongside Peato Pelenato and Pafelio Tumua in the 2020 election. He was elected as faipule for Nukunonu in the 2023 election.

In 2023, Tavite was appointed to lead the Ministry of Finance and Ministry of Health in the government of Ulu-o-Tokelau Kelihiano Kalolo. He oversaw Tokelau's response to the COVID-19 pandemic.

Tavite was selected as Ulu-o-Tokelau for 2024. The Ulu-o-Tokelau is the head of government of Tokelau. The office of ulu rotates on an annual basis between the Faipule, atoll leaders, of each of the country's three atolls. Esera Fofō Tuisano succeeded Tavite as Ulu-o-Tokelau.

Tavite was re-elected as faipule of Nukunonu in 2026. On 9 March 2026, he was sworn in as the Ulu-o-Tokelau for that year.

== Personal life ==
Tavite is married to Silivia Tavite. Silivia is a doctor and served as director of health for Tokelau.

== Political positions ==
Tavite has been critical of New Zealand for not providing enough funding for Tokelau to respond to problems created by climate change, such as rising sea levels. He has also criticised the state of Tokelau's infrastructure, as there was no airport and the length of sea travel between Tokelau and Samoa was too long.

== Works cited ==
=== News ===
- "Results are in for the 2023 Tokelau national election". Islands Business. 30 January 2023. Archived from the original on 9 July 2025.
- Knell, Conor (28 March 2024). "Thousands of Tokelauans gather for first time in seven years". The Post. Archived from the original on 9 July 2025.
- Lewis, Lydia (15 March 2025). "Tokelau sets sights on a potential third referendum". Radio New Zealand. Archived from the original on 9 July 2025.
- Lewis, Lydia (13 March 2023). "Tokelau welcomes new head of government". Radio New Zealand. Archived from the original on 9 July 2025.

=== Web ===
- "Declaration of Results for Tokelau National Elections 2023" (PDF). Tokelau. Archived (PDF) from the original on 13 June 2025.
- "Tokelau announce official general election 2020 results". Tokelau. Archived from the original on 9 July 2025.
- "Tokelau casts vote of confidence in experienced leaders". Tokelau. Archived from the original on 9 July 2025.
- "Tokelau Government". Tokelau. Archived from the original on 29 March 2024.
- "Tokelau measures and border control against Measles epidemic". Tokelau. 19 November 2019. Archived from the original on 9 July 2025.
- "Visit by the Ulu-o-Tokelau". New Zealand. Archived from the original on 18 April 2025.
