= Siopili Perez =

Tokelauan politician

23rd, 25th & 30th Ulu-o-Tokelau
- In office 19 May 2022 – 6 March 2023
- Preceded by: Kelihiano Kalolo
- Succeeded by: Kelihiano Kalolo
- In office 6 March 2017 – 5 March 2018
- Preceded by: Afega Gaualofa
- Succeeded by: Afega Gaualofa
- In office 23 February 2015 – 8 March 2016
- Preceded by: Kuresa Nasau
- Succeeded by: Afega Gaualofa

Siopili Perez is a Tokelauan politician. He served as the Head of Government of Tokelau (Tokelauan: Ulu-o-Tokelau) from 23 February 2015 to 8 March 2016, from 6 March 2017 to 5 March 2018 and from 19 May 2022 until 6 March 2023.

Perez was also Faipule (leader) of Nukunonu atoll from 2014 until 2023 when he was succeeded by Alapati Tavite.
