= Kelihiano Kalolo =

Tokelauan politician

Aliki Kelihiano Kalolo
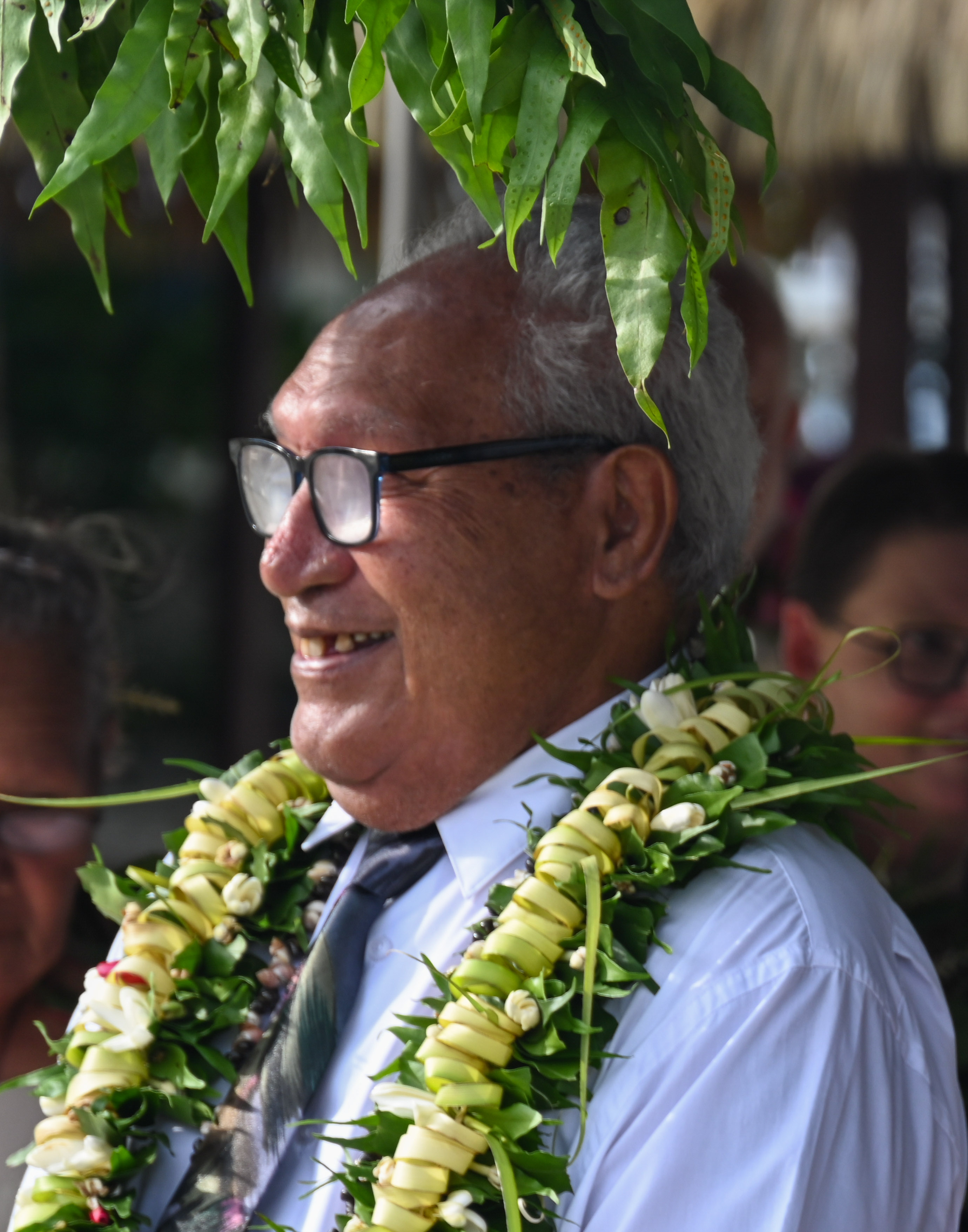

20th, 27th, 29th & 31st Ulu-o-Tokelau
- In office 6 March 2023 – 12 March 2024
- Administrator: Don Higgins
- Preceded by: Siopili Perez
- Succeeded by: Alapati Tavite
- In office 8 March 2021 – 19 May 2022
- Administrator: Ross Ardern
- Preceded by: Esera Fofō Tuisano
- Succeeded by: Siopili Perez
- In office 12 March 2019 – 9 March 2020
- Administrator: Ross Ardern
- Preceded by: Afega Gaualofa
- Succeeded by: Esera Fofō Tuisano
- In office February 2012 – March 2013
- Administrator: Jonathan Kings
- Preceded by: Foua Toloa
- Succeeded by: Salesio Lui

Faipule of Atafu
- Incumbent
- Assumed office 2017
- Preceded by: Kuresa Nasau
- In office 2011–2014
- Preceded by: Kuresa Nasau
- Succeeded by: Kuresa Nasau

Personal details
- Spouse: Atene Kalolo

Aliki Kelihiano Kalolo is a Tokelauan politician who has served several times as the Head of the Government of Tokelau (Tokelauan: Ulu-o-Tokelau), or Ulu, most recently from 6 March 2023 to 12 March 2024. He previously served in the same position from February 2012 to March 2013, again from 12 March 2019 to 9 March 2020, and again from 8 March 2021 to 19 May 2022. He is a member of the Council for the Ongoing Government of Tokelau, serving as Minister for Foreign Affairs, Education, Economic Development, Natural Resources and the Environment, prior to and then simultaneously to his leadership of the government. The office of Ulu rotates on an annual basis between the faipule of each of the country's three atolls; Kalolo, as faipule of Atafu, took office as Ulu for the first time in 2012.

== Political career ==
As Ulu, he oversaw the replacement of Tokelau's old ship, the MV Tokelau, which was considered no longer to be safe and seaworthy, with the newer, custom-built PB Matua, provided by New Zealand. In June 2012, Kalolo sacked his Minister for Transport, Foua Toloa, over the latter's insistence that the MV Tokelau was still seaworthy, and New Zealand Foreign Minister Murray McCully's indication that the New Zealand government could not work with Toloa. Toloa's portfolios (Finance, Telecommunications, Energy and Transport) were taken over by the Ulu.

Kalolo also oversaw the small country's transition from diesel-powered energy to solar energy, implemented by the New Zealand company Vector in 2012, this system was upgraded and repaired in 2020, also under his leadership.

In September 2012, he was appointed Chancellor of the regional University of the South Pacific. Prior to becoming Ulu, he had served as the University's co-ordinator in Tokelau.

His first term as Ulu ended in March 2013; his successor was Salesio Lui, the faipule of Nukunonu.

He became Ulu again in March 2019, replacing Afega Gaualofa. He was succeeded by Esera Fofō Tuisano.

He became Ulu once again in March 2021, replacing Esera Fofō Tuisano.

In 2020, Kalolo drafted a referendum set for 2025 for the territory to gain more autonomy or possibly become independent from New Zealand.

His third term as Ulu ended on 19 May 2022 and he was succeeded by Siopili Perez, faipule of Nukunonu.

He was elected Ulu once again on 6 March 2023, and succeeded by Alapati Tavite on 12 March 2024.

Kalolo was re-elected as faipule of Atafu in 2026.
