= Afega Gaualofa =

Tokelauan politician

24th and 26th Head of Government of Tokelau
- In office 5 March 2018 – 12 March 2019
- Preceded by: Siopili Perez
- Succeeded by: Kerisiano Kalolo
- In office 8 March 2016 – 6 March 2017
- Preceded by: Siopili Perez
- Succeeded by: Siopili Perez

Aliki Faipule Afega Gaualofa is a Tokelauan politician who served as the 24th and 26th Head of Government of Tokelau from 8 March 2016 to 6 March 2017 and again from 5 March 2018 to 12 March 2019. He had also served as the Faipule (leader) of Fakaofo atoll.
