= General Fono =

Unicameral parliament of Tokelau

General Fono Fono Fakamua
- Badge of the General Fono

Type
- Type: Unicameral parliament of Tokelau

Leadership
- Monarch: Charles III since 8 September 2022
- Administrator: Don Higgins since 2022
- Ulu-o-Tokelau: Alapati Tavite since 9 March 2026
- Seats: 20

Elections
- Last election: 5 February 2026

Website
- https://www.tokelau.org.nz/

The General Fono (Tokelauan: Fono Fakamua) is the unicameral parliament of Tokelau. It has 20 members, representing the 3 atolls. Elections are held every three years and meets several times a year. The location for these legislative sessions shifts among the atolls.

Tokelau is a de facto non-partisan democracy since both village and Fono elections are made without political parties.

The number of seats each atoll receives in the Fono is determined by population – currently Fakaofo and Atafu each have seven and Nukunonu has six. Faipule and pulenuku also sit in the Fono.

== History ==
Prior to 1999, the General Fono was composed of 27 members chosen by the Council of Elders (Tokelauan: Taupulega) of each village, with only the Faipule (village representative) and Pulenuku (village mayor) directly elected.

Elections for a reformed 18-member General Fono were held in January 1999. Each village returned six members: a Faipule, Deputy Faipule, Pulenuku, Deputy Pulenuku, and a male and female delegate.

A representation review following the 2001 census delegated seats to the atolls proportional to their population: 8 for Atafu, 7 for Fakaofo and 6 for Nukunonu (21 members total).

In June 2004, the Administrator of Tokelau formally delegated his responsibilities to the village councils of the three atolls, who in turn sub-delegated national matters to the General Fono, affirming the traditional authority (pule) of the councils.

The 2023 election was the first year that all atolls elected their members using the same electoral process, with the Nukunonu village council having previously opted out of the system which had been brought in in 2013. Nukunonu agreed to switch to the new process following changes to the rules to allow candidates to run for multiple positions. Atafu and Fakaofo each returned seven members to the Fono, while Nukunonu elected six members - approximately one member per 100 people of each village.

== Current composition ==
Position	Atafu members	Fakaofo members	Nukunonu members
Faipule	Kelihiano Kalolo	Esera Fofō Tuisano	Alapati Pita Tavite
Pulenuku	Malala Lafaialii	Feleti Tulafono	Petelo Patelesio
Hui Taupulega (Village elders)	Tile Elia	Kaio Isaako	Aleki Sakalia
Hui Taupulega (Village elders)	Stanley Lopa	Kaio Isaako	Viliamu Iosefo
Hui Taupulega (Village elders)	Heluka Sirila	Kaio Isaako	
Hui Taulelea (Men's group)	Tepapa Tom Ioane	Palelei Sili	Tufala Tavite
Hui Taulelea (Men's group)	Tepapa Tom Ioane	Tulafono Tulafono	Tufala Tavite
Hui Fatupaepae (Women's group)	Latu Lopa	Malia Pue	Suliana Pahina
Hui Fatupaepae (Women's group)	Latu Lopa	Elisapeta Helepa Vavega	Suliana Pahina

== See also ==
- Council for the Ongoing Government of Tokelau
