= Ulu-o-Tokelau =

Head of government of Tokelau

- Badge of Tokelau

- Flag of Tokelau

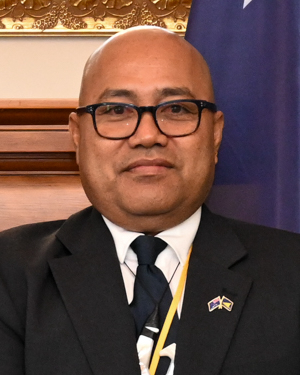
- Incumbent; Alapati Tavite since 9 March 2026
- Type: Head of government
- Abbreviation: Ulu
- Member of: Council for the Ongoing Government of Tokelau, General Fono
- Term length: 1 year
- Inaugural holder: Salesio Lui
- Formation: February 1993

The Ulu-o-Tokelau, often abbreviated to Ulu, is the head of government of Tokelau. The position rotates yearly between the faipule (leaders) of Tokelau's three atolls: Atafu, Fakaofo, and Nukunonu. The current Ulu is Alapati Tavite, who has held the position since 9 March 2026.

There have been 34 Ulu (14 individuals) from 1993, when the office was established, to 2026.

== List ==
Map of Tokelau: Atafu in blue, Nukunonu in green, Fakaofo in red

List of the Ulu-o-Tokelau
No.	Name	Portrait	Term of office	
No.	Name	Portrait	Took office	Left office
1	Salesio Lui		February 1993	February 1994
2	Keli Neemia		February 1994	February 1995
3	Lepaio Simi		February 1995	February 1996
4	Pio Tuia		February 1996	February 1997
5	Falima Teao		February 1997	February 1998
6	Kuresa Nasau		February 1998	February 1999
7	Pio Tuia (2nd time)		February 1999	February 2000
8	Kolouei O'Brien		February 2000	February 2001
9	Kuresa Nasau (2nd time)		February 2001	February 2002
10	Pio Tuia (3rd time)		February 2002	February 2003
11	Kolouei O'Brien (2nd time)		February 2003	February 2004
12	Patuki Isaako		February 2004	February 2005
13	Pio Tuia (4th time)		February 2005	15 February 2006
14	Kolouei O'Brien (3rd time)		15 February 2006	February 2007
15	Kuresa Nasau (3rd time)		February 2007	23 February 2008
16	Pio Tuia (5th time)		23 February 2008	21 February 2009
17	Foua Toloa		21 February 2009	22 March 2010
18	Kuresa Nasau (4th time)		22 March 2010	11 March 2011
19	Foua Toloa (2nd time)		11 March 2011	February 2012
20	Kelihiano Kalolo		February 2012	March 2013
21	Salesio Lui (2nd time)		March 2013	February 2014
22	Kuresa Nasau (5th time)		February 2014	23 February 2015
23	Siopili Perez		23 February 2015	8 March 2016
24	Afega Gaualofa		8 March 2016	6 March 2017
25	Siopili Perez (2nd time)		6 March 2017	5 March 2018
26	Afega Gaualofa (2nd time)		5 March 2018	12 March 2019
27	Kelihiano Kalolo (2nd time)		12 March 2019	9 March 2020
28	Esera Fofō Tuisano		9 March 2020	8 March 2021
29	Kelihiano Kalolo (3rd time)		8 March 2021	19 May 2022
30	Siopili Perez (3rd time)		19 May 2022	6 March 2023
31	Kelihiano Kalolo (4th time)		6 March 2023	12 March 2024
32	Alapati Tavite		12 March 2024	17 March 2025
33	Esera Fofō Tuisano (2nd time)		17 March 2025	9 March 2026
34	Alapati Tavite (2nd time)		9 March 2026	Incumbent

Faipule of Atafu
Faipule of Fakaofo
Faipule of Nukunonu

== See also ==
- Administrator of Tokelau
- Council for the Ongoing Government of Tokelau – executive body of the Tokelau government
