= Atafu =

Atoll in Tokelau

Coordinates: 8°33′26″S 172°28′15″W

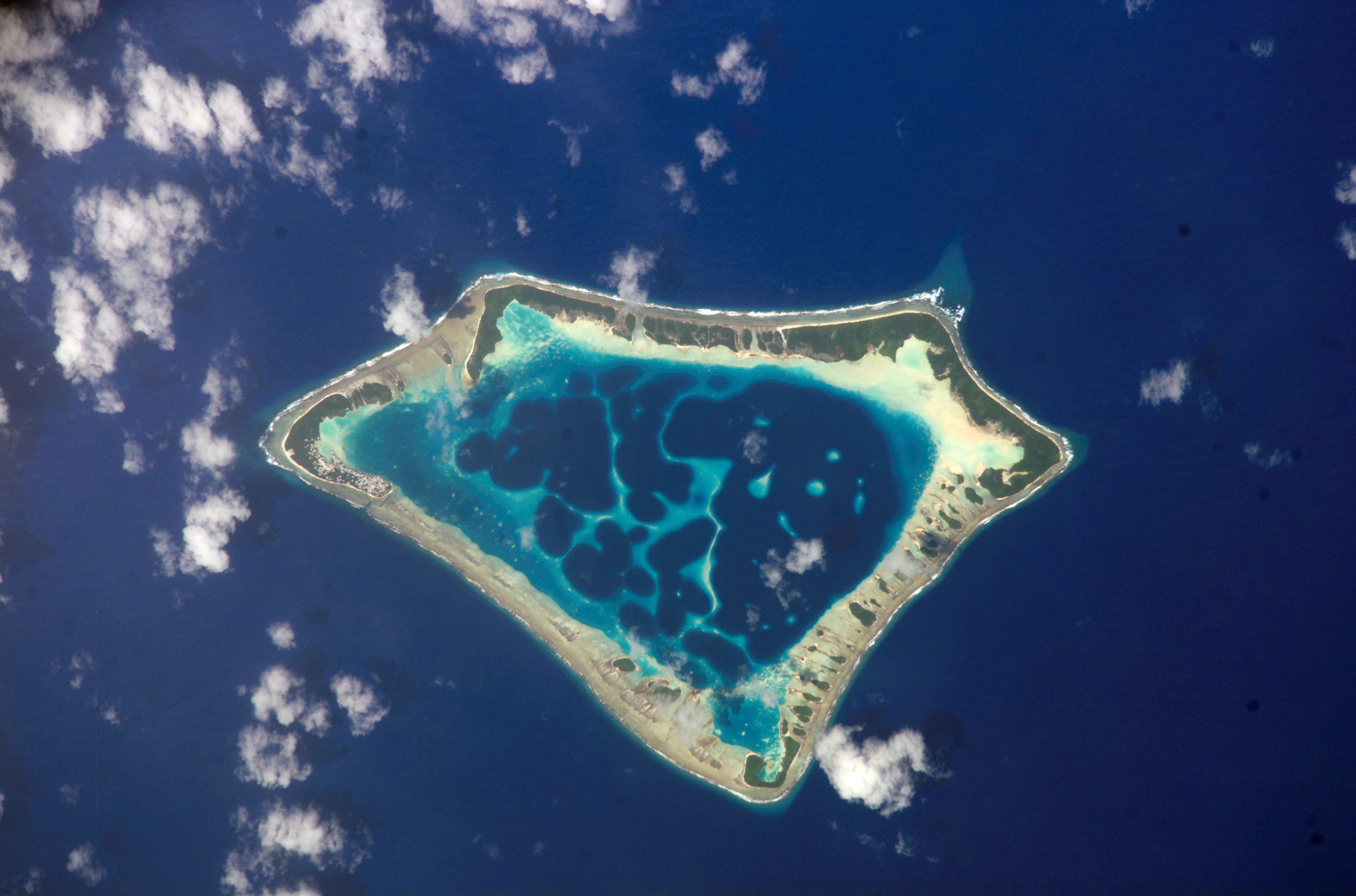

- Location within Tokelau Location within Oceania Location within Pacific Ocean

Geography
- Archipelago: Tokelau
- Total islands: 52
- Area: 2.5 km^{2} (0.97 sq mi)

Administration
- New Zealand
- Dependent territory: Tokelau
- Faipule (leader): Kelihiano Kalolo
- Pulenuku (mayor): Malala Lafaialii

Demographics
- Population: 541
- Languages: Tokelauan, English

Atafu, formerly known as the Duke of York Group, is a group of 52 coral islets within Tokelau in the south Pacific Ocean, 500 kilometres (270 nmi; 310 mi) north of Samoa. With a land area of 2.5 square kilometres (1.0 square mile), it is the smallest of the three islands that constitute Tokelau. It is an atoll and surrounds a central lagoon, which covers some 15 km^{2} (5.8 sq mi). The atoll lies 800 kilometres (430 nmi; 500 mi) south of the equator at 8° 35' South, 172° 30' West. Atafu is the northernmost area under New Zealand sovereignty.

== Population ==
According to the 2016 census, 541 people officially live on Atafu (although only 413 were present the night the census was taken). Of those present, 78% belong to the Congregational Church. The main settlement on the atoll is located on Atafu Island in its northwestern corner. The Presbyterian church was established on the island in 1858, but today almost all of the residents belong to the Congregational Christian Church. The first village on Atafu was established at its southern end: Residents built houses along the lagoon shore to take best advantage of the cooling trade winds.

Fishing is traditionally done by the men on Atafu, using various traditional methods that are passed on from fathers to sons. They create very effective lures, fish traps, nets, and seines. They commonly use the technique called "noose fishing", in which a circle of rope, tied with a noose knot, is dangled in the water; a large fish swims into the rope circle, lured by bait, and the noose is then tightened around its body, holding it fast. They also make well-crafted canoes, which they use for their fishing expeditions.

== Geography ==
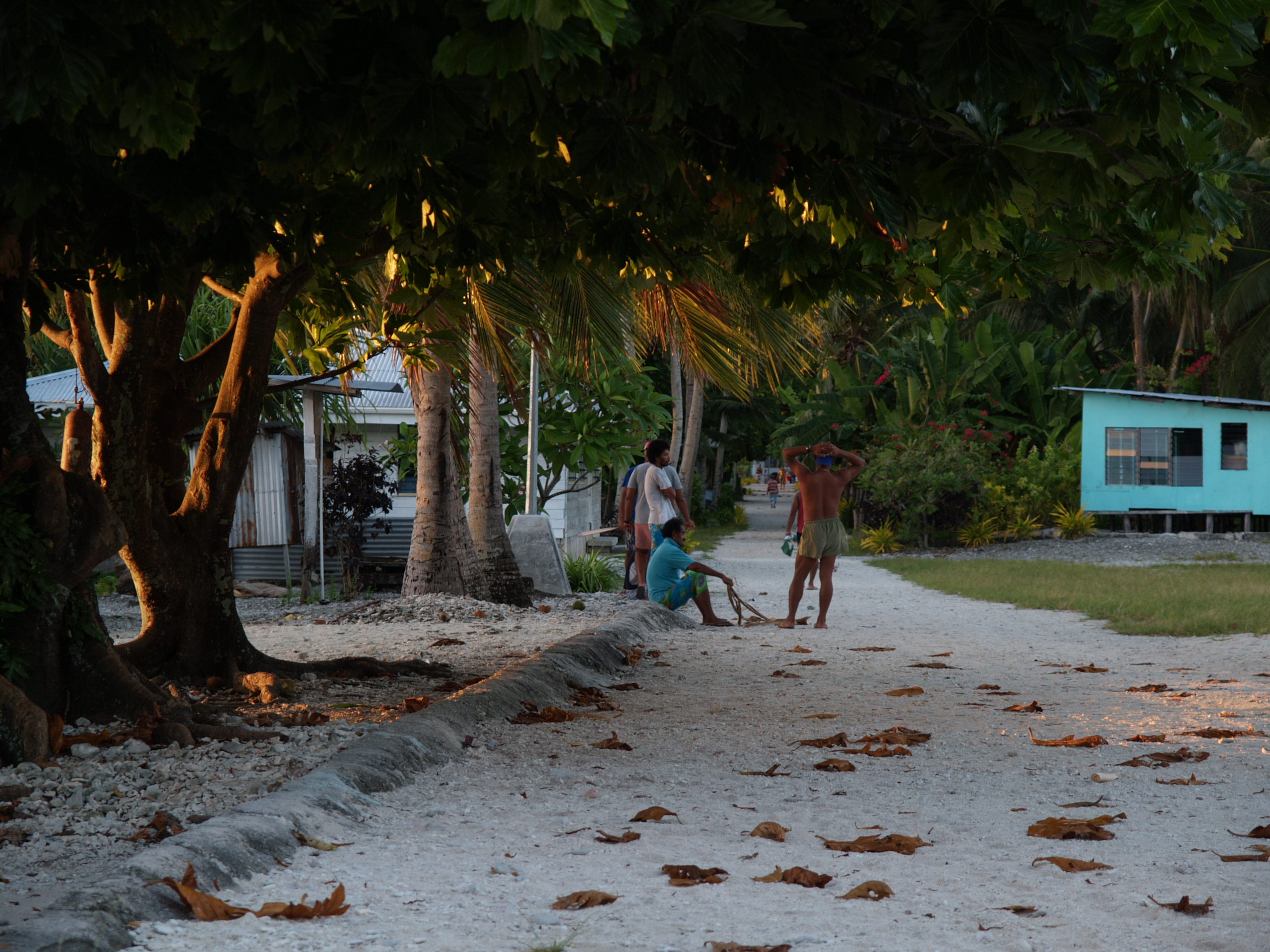
Dawn in the main street

Atafu lies in the Pacific hurricane belt. In January 1914, a massive storm demolished the church and most of the houses on the islands, and wiped out many of the coconut palms.

The atoll is roughly triangular in shape and encloses a lagoon some five kilometres (3.1 miles) north to south by four kilometres (2.5 miles) east to west at its widest point. It is low-lying, reaching a maximum altitude of only some five metres (16 feet), and is heavily vegetated with coconut palms and other trees, with undergrowth similar to that found on many small central Pacific islands. Lizards, rats, and seabirds are common on Atafu island. The atoll attracts a wide variety of fish in large numbers.

The eastern side of the lagoon is a nearly continuous thin strip of land with one small break halfway along its length. In contrast, the western side is composed of reef and several distinct islands, notably the inverted V shape of Atafu Island in the north, Alofi, which extends into the lagoon from the western reef, and the L-shaped Fenualoa in the southwest. The smaller Tamaseko Island lies in the lagoon close to Alofi.

The reef which connects the islands of the atoll is shallow enough that it is possible to walk between the islands at low tide. This also means that there is no boat passage to the lagoon, although the ocean becomes deep very close to the reef. This allows for good anchorage, but also makes for rough seas close to the reef. The flatness of the atoll and its location within the tropical cyclone belt has led to damage to island properties on occasion.

=== Important Bird Area ===
Some 70 ha of the southern and south-western parts of the atoll have been designated an Important Bird Area (IBA) by BirdLife International because the site supports breeding colonies of brown and black noddies and white terns, with about 30,000 breeding pairs estimated in 2011.

=== Islets ===
1. Fogalaki i Lalo
2. Fogalaki-Matangi (Fogalaki i Matagi)
3. Te Oki
4. Te Hepu
5. Laualalava
6. Te Kapi
7. Na Utua
8. Motu Atea
9. Motu Fakalalo
10. Tama Hakea
11. Hakea Lahi ki Matagi
12. Hakea O Himi
13. Malatea
14. Kenakena
15. Malo o Futa
16. Motu o Te Lakia
17. Komulo
18. Hakea o Apelamo
19. Na Hapiti
20. Niuefa
21. Fenualoa
22. Te Puka
23. Tamaheko
24. Te Alofi
25. Tulua a Kovi
26. Tagi a Kuli
27. Hakea o Himi
28. Tulua a Kava
29. Motu o te Niu
30. Malatea
31. Hakea o Hoi
32. Hakea o Fata
33. Kenakena
34. Matu o Tenumi
35. Matu o te Lakia
36. Motu Fakaka kai
37. Malo o Futa
38. Malo o Futa
39. Motu o te Fala
40. Tafega
41. Komulo
42. Hakela Lahi i Lalo
43. Hotoma
44. Hakea o Apelamo
45. Na Hapiti
46. Niuefa
47. Fenualoa
48. Te Puka
49. Tamaheko
50. Te Alofi
51. Ulugagie
52. Atafu Village

== History ==
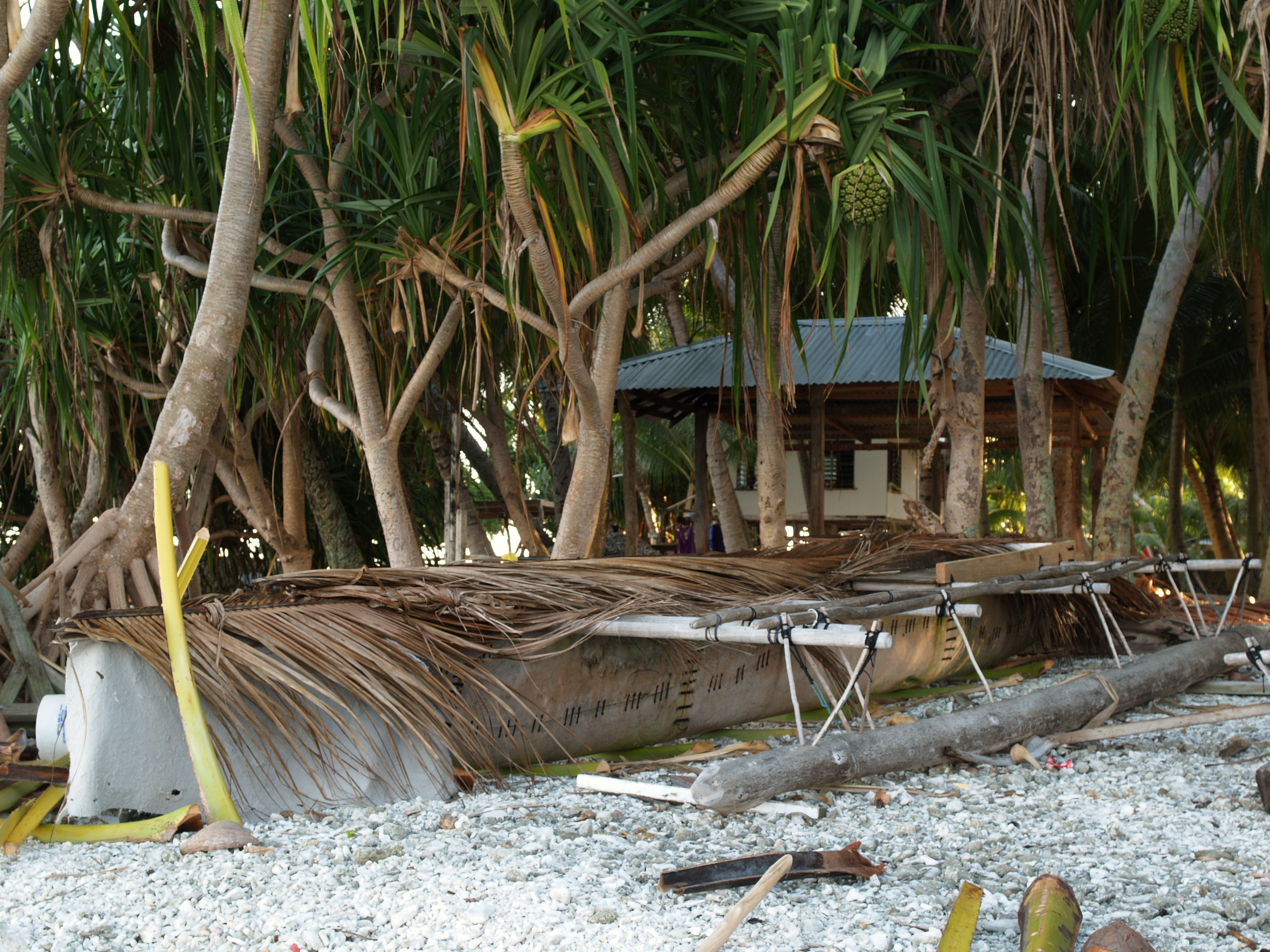
A traditional canoe or vaka

It is likely that Polynesians visited the island in ancient times, but they may not have settled there. The European discovery of the atoll came on 21 June 1765; it was made by John Byron, of HMS Dolphin. Byron found no one living on the island at that time. He named the island "Duke of York's island". According to Tokelauan oral tradition, Atafu was established by a man named Tonuia and his wife named Lagimaina, along with their seven children.

In 1859, the U.S. Guano Company claimed Duke of York along with a number of other Tokelauan atolls under the U.S. Guano Islands Act. The U.S. State Department bonded the claim in 1860. However, many of these islands were not worked by the company and in 1889 they were claimed by Great Britain as part of the Union Islands. In 1916, the Union Islands were annexed to the Gilbert and Ellice Islands colony and then, in 1925, reassigned to the Dominion of New Zealand under the administration of Territory of Western Samoa. In 1979, as part of the Treaty of Tokehega, the U.S. formally renounced its prior claim on Atafu and the other Tokelauan islands now under New Zealand sovereignty, and a maritime boundary between Tokelau and American Samoa was established.

On 26 August 2007, Ralph Tuijn, who was attempting to row a boat from South America to Australia, crash-landed on Atafu. On 26 November 2010, three teenage boys from Atafu were rescued after having drifted 1,300 km (800 mi) for 50 days in the Pacific.

== See also ==
- List of Guano Island claims
