= Administrator of Tokelau =

New Zealand government administrator

- Flag of Tokelau

- Flag of New Zealand
- Incumbent; Andre van der Walt since 1 June 2026
- Reports to: Minister of Foreign Affairs
- Seat: Ministry of Foreign Affairs and Trade, Wellington, New Zealand
- Appointer: Minister of Foreign Affairs
- Term length: 3 years, renewable
- Precursor: Administrator of Western Samoa
- Website: Administrator's Corner

The administrator of Tokelau is an official of the New Zealand Government, responsible for supervising the government of the dependent territory of Tokelau.

== Powers and functions ==
Certain powers and functions of the administrator are set forth in the Tokelau Act 1948, as amended from time to time. (The office of administrator is not, however, created by this Act.) The most important right of the administrator is the power to disallow any Rule passed by the Parliament of Tokelau (the General Fono); this must, however, be done within 30 days after the administrator is sent a copy of the Rule.

The administrator is assisted by a permanent staff of civil servants, which form the Office of the administrator of Tokelau, a part of New Zealand's Ministry of Foreign Affairs and Trade. The Office coordinates New Zealand government activity relating to Tokelau, especially economic assistance; provides expert policy-advice and assistance to the Tokelau government, also arranging for administrative assistance and training to the Tokelau public service; and represents the Tokelau public service in New Zealand, especially to the resident Tokelauan community. Besides these roles, the Office assists Tokelau to develop appropriate legal, governance and administration structures as Tokelau moves towards greater autonomy.

The administrator acts as a representative, not of the monarch personally, but of the New Zealand Government. The administration of Tokelau may also be overruled by the New Zealand Parliament, or by regulations made by the New Zealand Governor-General in Council.

== Appointment ==
The administrator is appointed by the New Zealand Minister of Foreign Affairs.

== History ==
The region of the Pacific Ocean in which Tokelau lies was declared a British protectorate in 1877, and the islands themselves came under British protection in 1889, being incorporated into the Gilbert and Ellice Islands Colony. This Colony was administered by officials responsible ultimately to the Colonial Office in London.

In 1925, Tokelau was separated from the Gilbert and Ellice Islands, becoming its own colony. In reality, however, it was administered from New Zealand, the Governor-General of New Zealand being appointed Governor of Tokelau. The Governor-General at the time, Sir Charles Fergusson, the next year appointed the High Commissioner of Western Samoa, Maj Gen Sir George Spafford Richardson, as administrator, with a delegation of the Vice-Regal powers. This situation continued up until 1948, when sovereignty over Tokelau was transferred from the United Kingdom to New Zealand.

In recent years, administrators have tended to be senior civil servants, politicians, or career diplomats.

== List of administrators ==
Up to 1961, the administrator of Tokelau was the administrator of Samoa.

Administrators of Tokelau
No.	Name	Portrait	Term of office	
No.	Name	Portrait	Start date	End date
1	Maj Gen Sir George Spafford Richardson		1926	1928
2	Col Sir Stephen Allen		1928	1931
3	Brig Gen Sir Herbert Hart		1931	1935
4	Sir Alfred Turnbull		1935	1946
5	Lt Col Francis William Voelcker		1946	1949
6	Guy Powles		1949	February 1960
7	Jack Wright		February 1960	31 March 1965
8	Owston Paul Gabites		June 1965	1968
9	Richard Taylor		1968	1971
10	Duncan MacIntyre		1971	1972
11	Matiu Rata		1972	1973
12	Gray Thorp		1973	1975
13	Frank Corner		1975	1984
14	Tim Francis		1984	1988
15	Neil Walter (1st time)		February 1988	1990
16	Graham Ansell		1990	January 1992
17	Brian William Peter Absolum		January 1992	March 1993
18	Lindsay Watt		March 1993	28 February 2003
19	Neil Walter (2nd time)		1 March 2003	17 October 2006
20	David Payton		17 October 2006	2009
21	John Allen (acting)		2009	2011
22	Jonathan Kings (1st time)		2011	2015
23	Linda Te Puni (acting)		2015	2016
24	David Nicholson		2016	August 2017
25	Brook Barrington (acting)		August 2017	2017
26	Jonathan Kings (2nd time)		2017	2018
27	Ross Ardern		Early 2018	2022
28	Don Higgins		2022	2026
29	Andre van der Walt		June 2026	Incumbent

== See also ==
- Administrator of the government
- Ulu-o-Tokelau – the head of government
