= Tokelau =

Dependent territory of New Zealand in the southern Pacific Ocean

- Dependent territory of New Zealand
- Flag Badge
- Motto: "Tokelau mo te Atua" (Tokelauan) ("Tokelau for the Almighty")
- Anthem: "Te Atua o Tokelau"
- Royal anthem: "God Save the King"

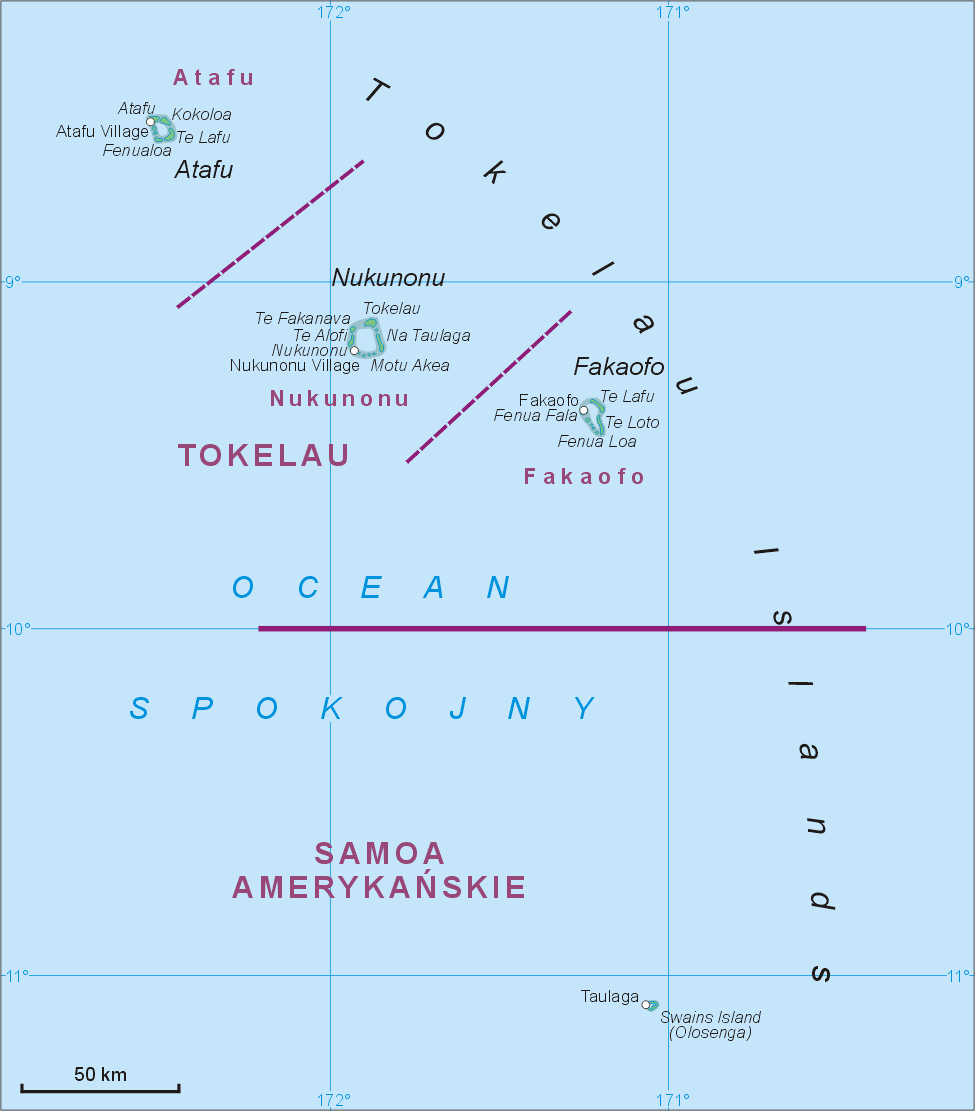
- Map of all Tokelau Islands. Swains Island is shown to the south.
- Sovereign state: New Zealand
- Protectorate created: June 1889
- British colony: 29 February 1916
- Assigned to New Zealand: 11 February 1926
- New Zealand sovereignty: 1 January 1949
- Capital: None (Note: Each atoll has its own administrative centre.)
- Largest city: Atafu
- Official languages: Tokelauan; English
- Demonym(s): Tokelauan
- Government: Devolved parliamentary dependency under a constitutional monarchy
  - Monarch: Charles III
  - Administrator: Andre van der Walt
  - Ulu-o-Tokelau: Alapati Tavite
- Legislature: General Fono

Area
  - Total: 10 km^{2} (3.9 sq mi)
  - Water (%): negligible
- Highest elevation: 5 m (16 ft)

Population
  - 2026 estimate: 2,691 ▲
  - 2016 census: 1,499 (237th)
  - Density: 115/km^{2} (297.8/sq mi) (86th)
- GDP (nominal): 2017 estimate
  - Total: US$9,406,225
  - Per capita: US$6,275
- Currency: New Zealand dollar (NZ$) (NZD)
- Time zone: UTC+13:00
- Date format: dd/mm/yyyy
- Driving side: Left
- Calling code: +690
- ISO 3166 code: TK
- Internet TLD: .tk

Tokelau (/ˈtoʊkəlaʊ/; lit. 'north-northeast' or 'north wind'; known previously as the Union Islands, and, until 1976, known officially as the Tokelau Islands) is a dependent territory of New Zealand in the southern Pacific Ocean. It consists of three tropical coral atolls: Atafu, Nukunonu, and Fakaofo. They have a combined land area of 10 km^{2} (4 sq mi). In addition to these three, Swains Island (Olohega), which forms part of the same archipelago, is the subject of an ongoing territorial dispute, while being currently administered by the United States as part of American Samoa. Tokelau lies north of the Samoan Islands, east of Tuvalu, south of the Phoenix Islands, southwest of the more distant Line Islands, and northwest of the Cook Islands. The islands sit in the south east hemisphere.

Tokelau has a population of approximately 2,500 people; it has the fourth-smallest population of any sovereign state or dependency in the world. As of the 2016 census, around 45% of its residents had been born overseas, mostly in Samoa or New Zealand. The populace has a life expectancy of 69, which is comparable to that of other Oceanian island nations. Approximately 94% of the population speak Tokelauan as their first language. Tokelau has the smallest economy of any nation. It is a leader in renewable energy, being the first 100% solar-powered nation in the world.

Tokelau is officially referred to as a nation by both the New Zealand government and the Tokelauan government. It is free and democratic, with elections every three years. However, in 2007, the United Nations General Assembly included Tokelau on its list of non-self-governing territories. Its inclusion on this list is controversial, as Tokelauans have twice narrowly failed to reach a two-thirds majority for further self-determination in referendums, (Note: Referendums were held in 2006 and 2007. Both required two-thirds support in order to make Tokelau a self-governing associated state of New Zealand; both received over 60% support, but below the two-thirds needed.) and the islands' small population makes the viability of self-government challenging. The basis of Tokelau's legislative, administrative and judicial systems is the Tokelau Islands Act 1948, which has been amended several times. Since 1993, the territory has annually elected its own head of government, the Ulu-o-Tokelau. Before 1993, the administrator of Tokelau was the highest official in the government and the territory was directly administered by a New Zealand government department.

== Etymology ==
Tokelau is a word meaning "north wind" in the native Tokelauan language. The Tokelau islands were named the Union Islands and Union Group by European explorers at an earlier time. Tokelau Islands was adopted as the islands' official name in 1946. The name was officially shortened to Tokelau on 9 December 1976.

== History ==
=== Pre-history ===
Archaeological evidence indicates that the atolls of Tokelau – Atafu, Nukunonu, and Fakaofo – were settled about 1,000 years ago from Samoa and may have been a gateway into Eastern Polynesia. The inhabitants embrace Polynesian mythology and the local god, Tui Tokelau. Over time, they developed distinctive musical and art forms. The three atolls have historically functioned separately politically, while maintaining social and linguistic cohesion. Tokelauan society has been governed by chiefly clans, and there have been occasional skirmishes and wars between the atolls, as well as inter-marriage. Fakaofo, the "chiefly island", held some dominion over Atafu and Nukunonu after the dispersal of Atafu. Life on the atolls was historically subsistence-based, with a diet that relied mainly on fish and coconut.

=== Contact with other cultures ===
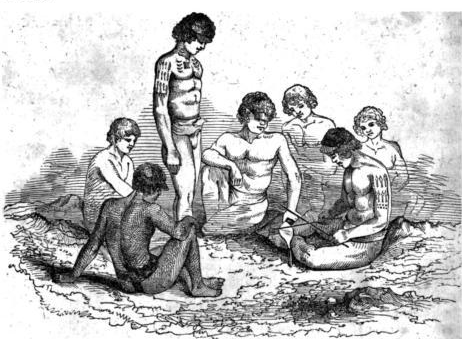
Fakaofo islanders, drawn in 1841 by the United States Exploring Expedition

The first European to sight Atafu was British Navy officer Commodore John Byron, on 24 June 1765. He called the island Duke of York's Island. Parties from his expedition who landed ashore reported that there were no signs of current or previous inhabitants. Captain Edward Edwards, having learned of Byron's discovery, visited Atafu on 6 June 1791 in search of the Bounty mutineers. They found no inhabitants, but saw that there were houses containing canoes and fishing gear, which suggested to them that the island was being used as a temporary residence by fishing parties from other, nearby islands. On 12 June 1791, Edwards sailed farther south, and sighted Nukunonu, naming it Duke of Clarence's Island. A landing party that went ashore was unable to make contact with the inhabitants, but saw "morais", burying places, and canoes with "stages in their middle" sailing across the island's lagoons.

On 29 October 1825, August R. Strong of the USS Dolphin and his crew arrived at the atoll Nukunonu. He wrote:

Upon examination, we found they had removed all the women and children from the settlement, which was quite small, and put them in canoes lying off a rock in the lagoon. They would frequently come near the shore, but when we approached they would pull off with great noise and precipitation.

On 14 February 1835, Captain Smith, of the United States whaling ship General Jackson, wrote of having sighted Fakaofo, which he chose to call D'Wolf's Island. On 25 January 1841, the United States Exploring Expedition visited Atafu, and discovered a small population living on the island. The residents appeared to be there only temporarily, because there was no chief among them, and they had the kind of double canoes that were typically used for inter-island travel. They appeared to have interacted with foreigners in the past, because they expressed a desire to engage in barter with the expedition crew, and they possessed items that were apparently of foreign origin: blue beads and a plane-iron. A few days later, French explorer Captain Morvan sighted Fakaofo. The American expedition reached Nukunonu on 28 January 1841, but did not record any information about inhabitants. On 29 January 1841, the expedition sighted Fakaofo and named it Bowditch. The Fakaofo islanders were found to be similar in appearance and behaviour to the Atafu islanders.

Missionaries preached Christianity in Tokelau from 1845 to the 1870s. French Catholic missionaries on Wallis Island (also known as 'Uvea) and missionaries of the Protestant London Missionary Society in Samoa used native teachers to convert the Tokelauans. Atafu was converted to Protestantism by the London Missionary Society, Nukunonu was converted to Catholicism and Fakaofo was converted to both denominations. The Rev. Samuel James Whitmee, of the London Missionary Society, visited Tokelau in 1870.

Helped by Swains Island-based Eli Jennings Sr, Peruvian "blackbird" slave traders arrived in 1863 and kidnapped nearly all (253) of the able-bodied men to work as labourers, depopulating the atolls. The Tokelauan men died of dysentery and smallpox, and very few returned. With that loss, the system of governance became based on the "Taupulega", or "Councils of Elders", on which individual families on each atoll were represented. During that time, Polynesian immigrants settled, followed by American, Scottish, French, Portuguese and German beachcombers, marrying local women and repopulating the atolls.

In 1856 the United States claimed that it held sovereignty over the island and the other Tokelauan atolls under the Guano Islands Act. In 1979, the U.S. conceded that Tokelau was under New Zealand sovereignty, and a maritime boundary between Tokelau and American Samoa was established by the Treaty of Tokehega.

In 1889, Tokelau became a protectorate of the United Kingdom. At the time it was considered a possible staging point for a trans-Pacific telegraph line. The islands were placed under the jurisdiction of the Western Pacific High Commission, notionally under the authority of deputy commissioners based in Samoa (until 1899) and the Gilbert and Ellice Islands. No official representative was resident in the islands and due to their distance and small population they were visited by the deputy commissioner only infrequently. In 1916, Tokelau was annexed and incorporated into the Gilbert and Ellice Islands Colony. In 1926, it was incorporated into New Zealand.

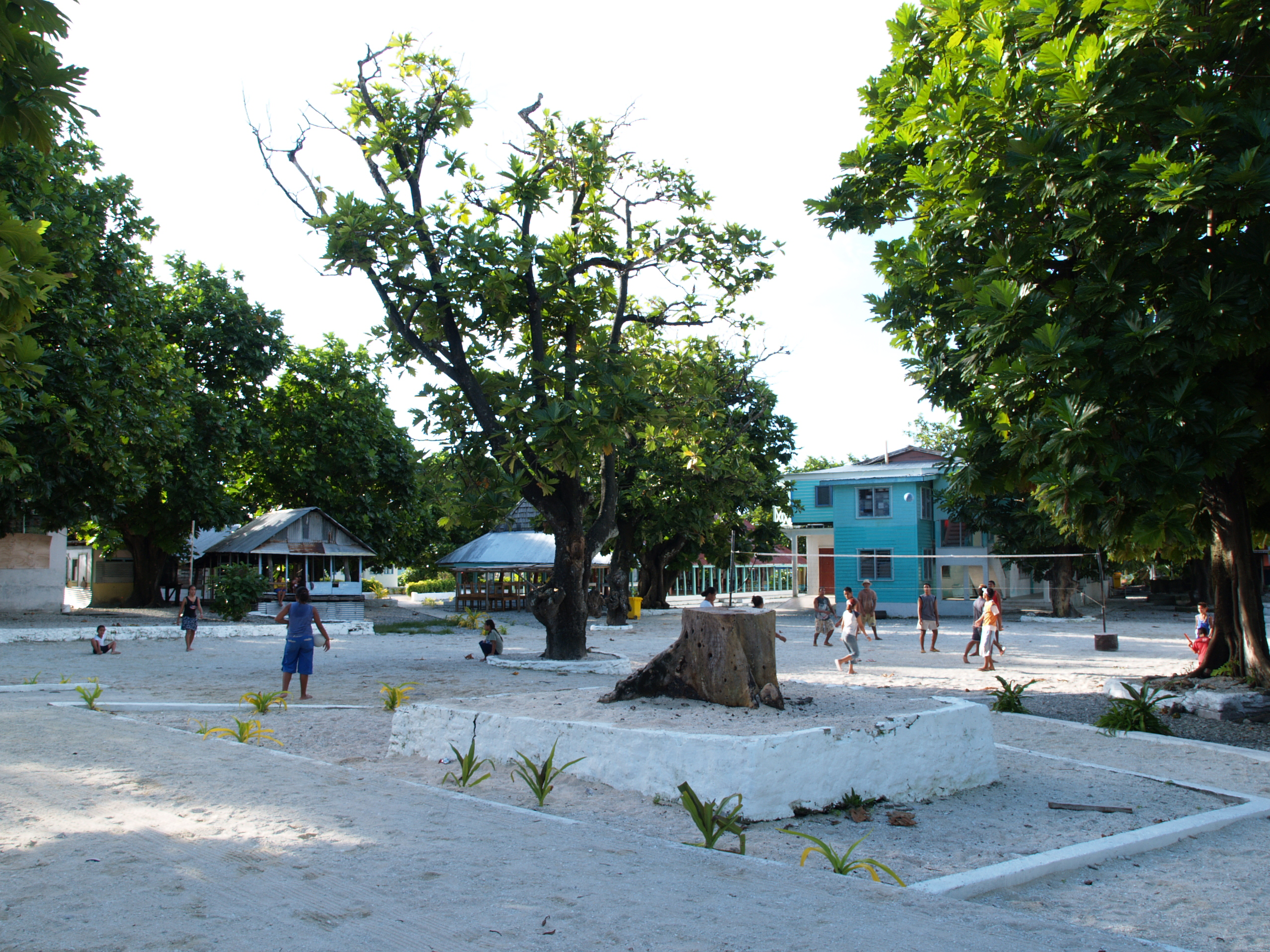
The square in the centre of the village of Fakaofo

=== Tropical cyclones ===
Cyclone Percy struck and severely damaged Tokelau in late February and early March 2005. Forecasters underestimated the cyclone's strength and the length of time it would be in vicinity to Tokelau. It coincided with a spring tide which put most of the area of the two villages on Fakaofo and Nukunonu under a metre (3 ft 3 in) of seawater. The cyclone also caused major erosion on several islets of all three atolls, damaging roads and bridges and disrupting electric power and telecommunications systems. The cyclone did significant and widespread damage to food crops including bananas, coconuts and pandanus. It did not seriously injure anyone but villagers lost significant amounts of property.

No significant land is more than two metres (6.6 feet) above high water of ordinary tides. This means Tokelau is particularly vulnerable to future sea level rise.

=== Time zone ===
Until December 2011, Tokelau was 11 hours behind Coordinated Universal Time (UTC). At midnight 29 December 2011 Tokelau shifted to UTC+13:00 in response to Samoa's decision to switch sides of the International Dateline. This brought Tokelau closer to New Zealand time (and in the process omitted 30 December).

The Time and Date website says that "the international time zone community has apparently been listing the wrong local time for Tokelau since 1901" and that "most sources, including the commonly referred to International Atlas by Shanks/Pottenger, claim that the UTC offset is +14 hours, or equivalent" (UTC-10:00 before 29 December 2011 and afterwards, UTC-10:00 plus one day).

== Government ==
In 1877, the islands were included under the protection of the United Kingdom by an Order in Council that claimed jurisdiction over all unclaimed Pacific Islands. Commander C. F. Oldham on HMS Egeria landed at each of the three atolls in June 1889 and officially raised the Union Flag, declaring the group a British protectorate. In conformity with desire expressed by "the Native government" they were annexed by the United Kingdom and included in the Gilbert Islands by the Tokelau Islands (Union Islands) Order in Council, 1916. The annexation took place on 29 February 1916. From the point in time that the islands were annexed, their people had the status of British subjects. Tokelau was removed from the Gilbert and Ellice Islands Colony and placed under the jurisdiction of the Governor-General of New Zealand in 1925, two Orders in Council being made for the purpose on the same day. This step meant that New Zealand took over administration of Tokelau from the United Kingdom on 11 February 1926. At this point, Tokelau was still a territory under the sovereignty of the United Kingdom but administered by New Zealand.

The Union Islands (Revocation) Order in Council, 1948 after reciting the agreement by the governments of the United Kingdom and New Zealand that the islands should become part of New Zealand, revoked the Union Islands (No. 2) Order in Council, 1925, with effect from a date fixed by the Governor-General of New Zealand after he was satisfied that the New Zealand Parliament had provided for the incorporation of the islands with New Zealand, as it did by the Tokelau Islands Act 1948. Tokelau formally became part of New Zealand on 1 January 1949.

The Dominion of New Zealand, of which Tokelau formerly was a part, has since been superseded by the Realm of New Zealand, of which Tokelau remains a part. When the British Nationality and New Zealand Citizenship Act 1948 came into effect on 1 January 1949, Tokelauans who were British subjects gained New Zealand citizenship; a status they still hold.

Villages are entitled to enact their own laws regulating their daily lives and New Zealand law only applies where it has been extended by specific enactment. Serious crime is rare and there are no prisons, and offenders are publicly rebuked, fined or made to work.

== Politics ==
The head of state is Charles III, the King in Right of New Zealand, who also reigns over the other Commonwealth realms. The King is represented in the territory by the Administrator – currently Andre van der Walt. The current head of government (Tokelauan: Ulu-o-Tokelau) is Alapati Tavite, who presides over the Council for the Ongoing Government of Tokelau, which functions as a cabinet. The Council consists of the faipule (leader) and pulenuku (village mayor) of each of the three atolls. The administrator is appointed by the minister of Foreign Affairs and Trade of New Zealand, and the role of head of government rotates between the three faipule for a one-year term.

The Tokelau Amendment Act of 1996 confers legislative power on the General Fono, a unicameral body. The number of seats each atoll receives in the Fono is determined by population – at present, Fakaofo and Atafu each have seven and Nukunonu has six. Faipule and pulenuku also sit in the Fono.

On 11 November 2004, Tokelau and New Zealand took steps to formulate a treaty that would turn Tokelau from a non-self-governing territory to a self-governing state in free association with New Zealand. Besides the treaty, a United Nations-sponsored referendum on self-determination took place, with the three islands voting on successive days starting 13 February 2006. (Tokelauans in Apia, Samoa, voted on 11 February.) Out of 581 votes cast, 349 were for Free Association, being short of the two-thirds majority required for the measure to pass. The referendum was profiled (somewhat light-heartedly) in the 1 May 2006 issue of The New Yorker magazine. A repeat referendum took place on 20–24 October 2007, again narrowly failing to approve self-government. This time the vote was short by just 16 votes or 3%.

In May 2008, the United Nations' Secretary General Ban Ki-moon urged colonial powers "to complete the decolonization process in every one of the remaining 16 non-self-governing territories", including Tokelau. This led The New Zealand Herald to comment that the United Nations was "apparently frustrated by two failed attempts to get Tokelau to vote for independence". In April 2008, speaking as leader of the National Party, future New Zealand Prime Minister John Key stated that New Zealand had "imposed two referenda on the people of the Tokelau Islands", and questioned "the accepted wisdom that small states should undergo a de-colonisation process".

== Defence and police ==
Consistent with the principles of partnership with New Zealand, defence is the responsibility of the New Zealand Government. The New Zealand Defence Force has responsibilities for protecting the territory as well as its offshore exclusive economic zone (EEZ). The total offshore EEZ is about 300,000 square kilometres (120,000 sq mi). Vessels of the Royal New Zealand Navy are employed for this task including its Protector-class offshore patrol vessels. Tokelau has its own customs regulations.

Given Tokelau's limited wharf facilities, the Navy's multi-role ship, HMNZS Canterbury, has been employed to provide logistics support to the territory.

Little crime has been reported in Tokelau and a total of nine police officers were reported as present as of the early 2020s: three each on Fakaofo, Nukunonu and Atafu. According to the Government they are responsible to the village authorities for the enforcement of law and order and to the public service for their various civil duties.

== Geography ==
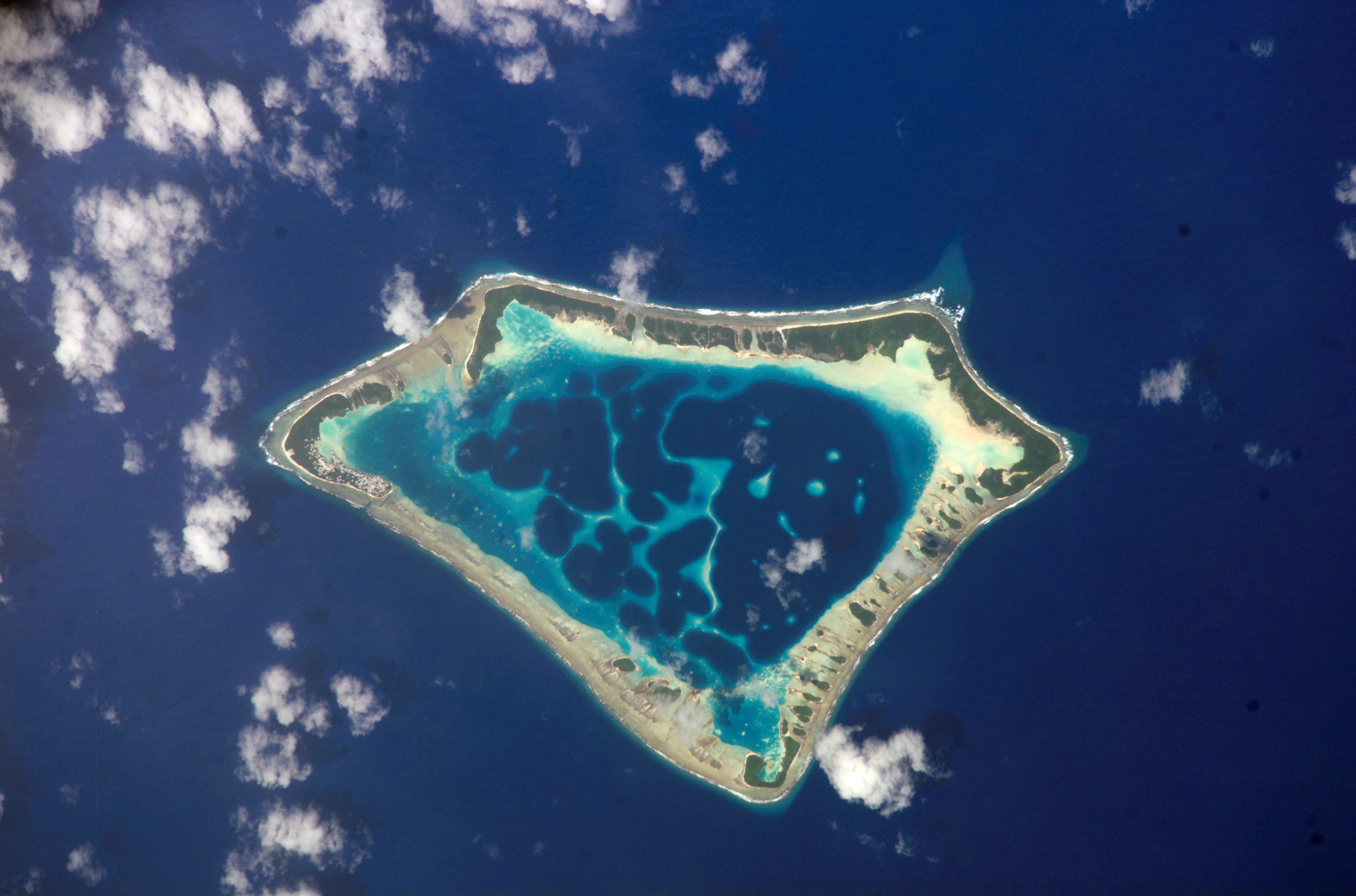
Atafu Atoll

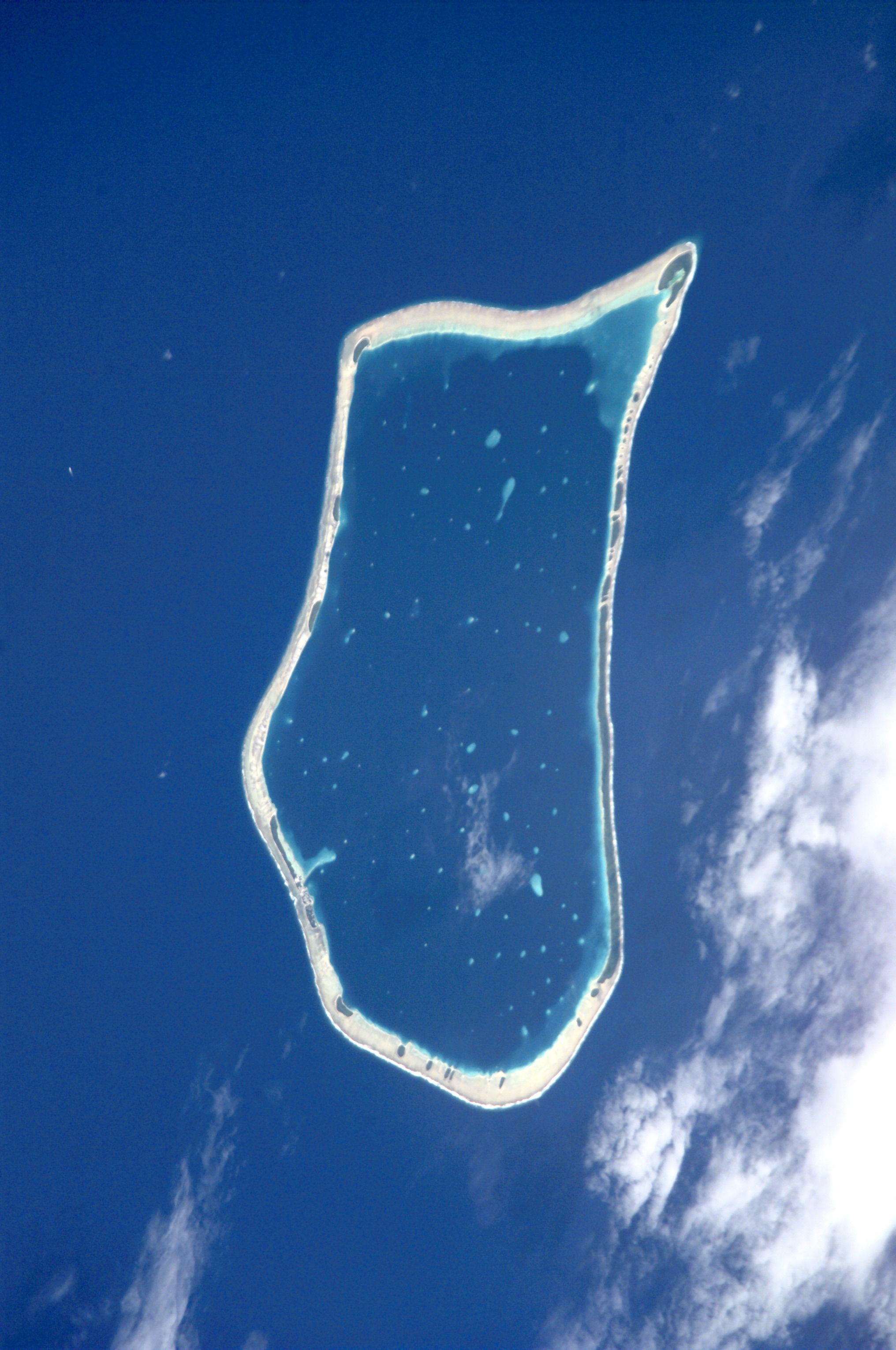
Nukunonu Atoll

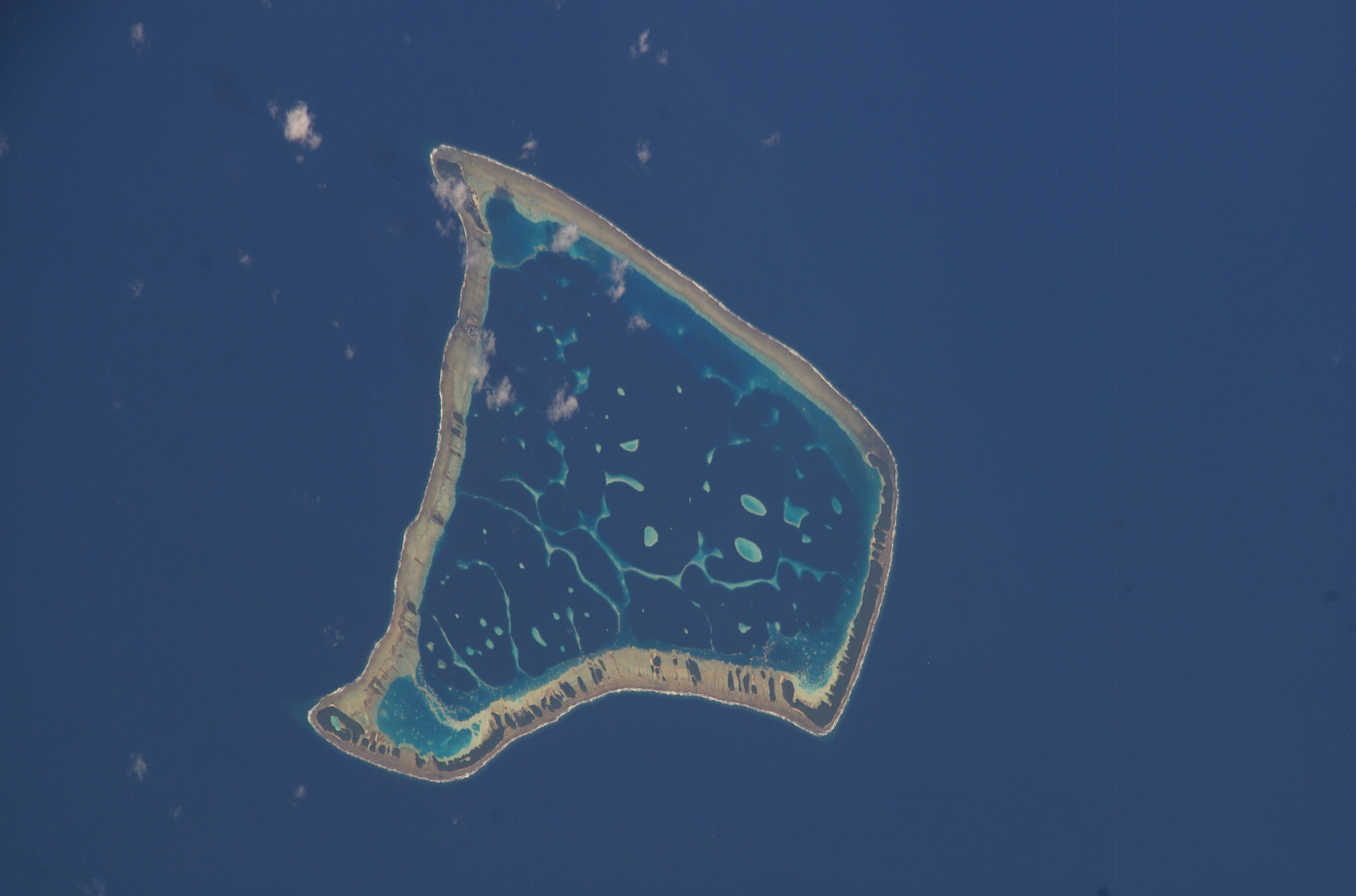
Fakaofo Atoll

Tokelau includes three atolls in the South Pacific Ocean between longitudes 171° W and 173° W and between latitudes 8° S and 10° S, about midway between Hawaii and New Zealand. From Atafu in the north to Fakaofo in the south, Tokelau extends for less than 200 kilometres (120 mi). The atolls lie about 500 kilometres (310 mi) north of Samoa. The atolls are Atafu and Nukunonu, both in an island group once called the Duke of Clarence Group, and Fakaofo, once Bowditch Island. Their combined land area is 10.8 square kilometres (4.2 sq mi). The atolls each have a number of coral islands, where the villages are situated. The highest point of Tokelau is just 5 metres (16 ft) above sea level. There are no ports or harbours for large vessels, however, all three atolls have a jetty to and from which supplies and passengers are shipped. Tokelau lies in the Pacific tropical cyclone belt. A fourth island that is culturally, historically, and geographically, but not politically, a part of the Tokelau Islands is Swains Island (Olohega), under United States control since about 1900 and administered as a part of American Samoa since 1925.

Swains Island was claimed by the United States pursuant to the Guano Islands Act, as were the other three islands of Tokelau; the latter three claims were ceded to Tokelau by treaty in 1979. In the draft constitution of Tokelau subject to the Tokelauan self-determination referendum in 2006, Olohega (Swains Island) was also claimed as a part of Tokelau, though the claim was surrendered in the same 1979 treaty. This established a clearly defined boundary between American Samoa and Tokelau.

Tokelau's claim to Swains is generally comparable to the Marshall Islands' claim to U.S.-administered Wake Island, but the re-emergence of this somewhat dormant issue has been an unintended result of the United Nations' recent efforts to promote decolonisation in Tokelau. Tokelauans have proven somewhat reluctant to push their national identity in the political realm: recent decolonisation moves have mainly been driven from outside for ideological reasons. But at the same time, Tokelauans are reluctant to disown their common cultural identity with Swains Islanders who speak their language.

Tokelau has a tropical climate, classified by the Köppen climate classification as a tropical rainforest climate (Af.) This climate is prevalent on all three atolls.

Tokelau's atolls
Atoll	Population	Coordinates
Atafu	541	8°33′6″S 172°30′3″W
Nukunonu	531	9°10′6″S 171°48′35″W
Fakaofo	483	9°21′55″S 171°12′54″W

== Environment ==
Tokelau is located in the Western Polynesian tropical moist forests ecoregion. Most of the original vegetation has been replaced by coconut plantations, some of which have been abandoned and became scrubby forests. The atolls of Tokelau provide habitat for 38 indigenous plant species, over 150 insect species and 10 land crab species. One of the greatest threats to biodiversity is posed by introduced mammalian predators such as the Polynesian Rat.

In 2011 Tokelau declared its entire exclusive economic zone of 319,031 km^{2} (123,179 sq mi) a shark sanctuary.

In April 2025, Conservation International led a scientific expedition to Tokelau undertaken with New Zealand Geographic. Conservation International Aotearoa indicated the reefs showed signs of recovery after a marine heatwave and widespread coral bleaching in the region.

== Economy ==
Tokelau's economy is among the smallest globally, primarily characterized by subsistence agriculture and fishing. The residents cultivate crops such as coconuts (for copra), taro, breadfruit, papayas, bananas, and figs, and raise livestock including pigs and poultry. Fishing, particularly for local consumption, plays a vital role in their sustenance.

=== Economic overview ===
The territory's economic activities are limited, with revenues stemming from the sale of copra, postage stamps, souvenir coins, handicrafts, and remittances from Tokelauans residing in New Zealand. These remittances are significant, given that approximately 80% of Tokelauans live abroad.

In recent years, Tokelau has sought to diversify its revenue streams. Notably, the territory has generated income through the registration of domain names under its country code top-level domain (ccTLD), .tk. By 2012, about one-sixth of Tokelau's economy was derived from this source.

=== Solar power ===
The goal of 100% renewable electricity was met on 7 November 2012, according to the Foreign Affairs Minister of New Zealand, Murray McCully. Previously electricity was generated using diesel generators and was only available about 16 hours per day.

Three solar power stations with a total generation capacity of 930kWp were installed to provide 100% of current electrical demand from photovoltaics, with lead acid battery backup able to store around 8MWh. The first power station was completed in August 2012. In total, 4,032 solar panels are used and 1,344 batteries weighing 250 kilograms (550 lb) each. The systems are designed to withstand winds of 230 km/h (143 mph). By 2011, Tokelau's electricity was 93% generated by photovoltaics, with the remainder generated from coconut oil. As of 2019, increased demand and degradation of batteries had led to increased need for backup power. Plans were made for an additional 210 kW of PV and close to 2MWh of lithium-ion battery capacity.

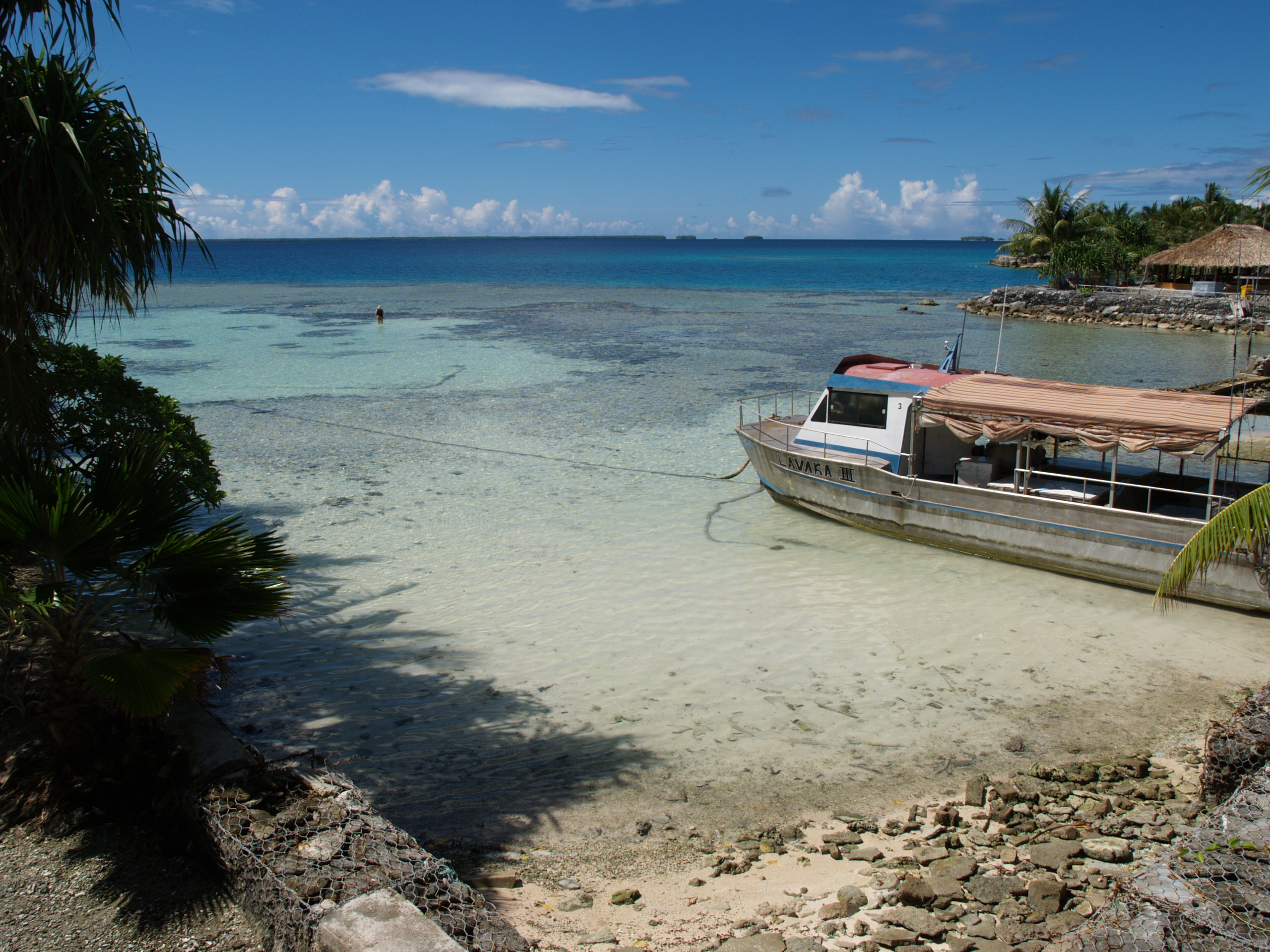
Nukunonu Lagoon in Tokelau

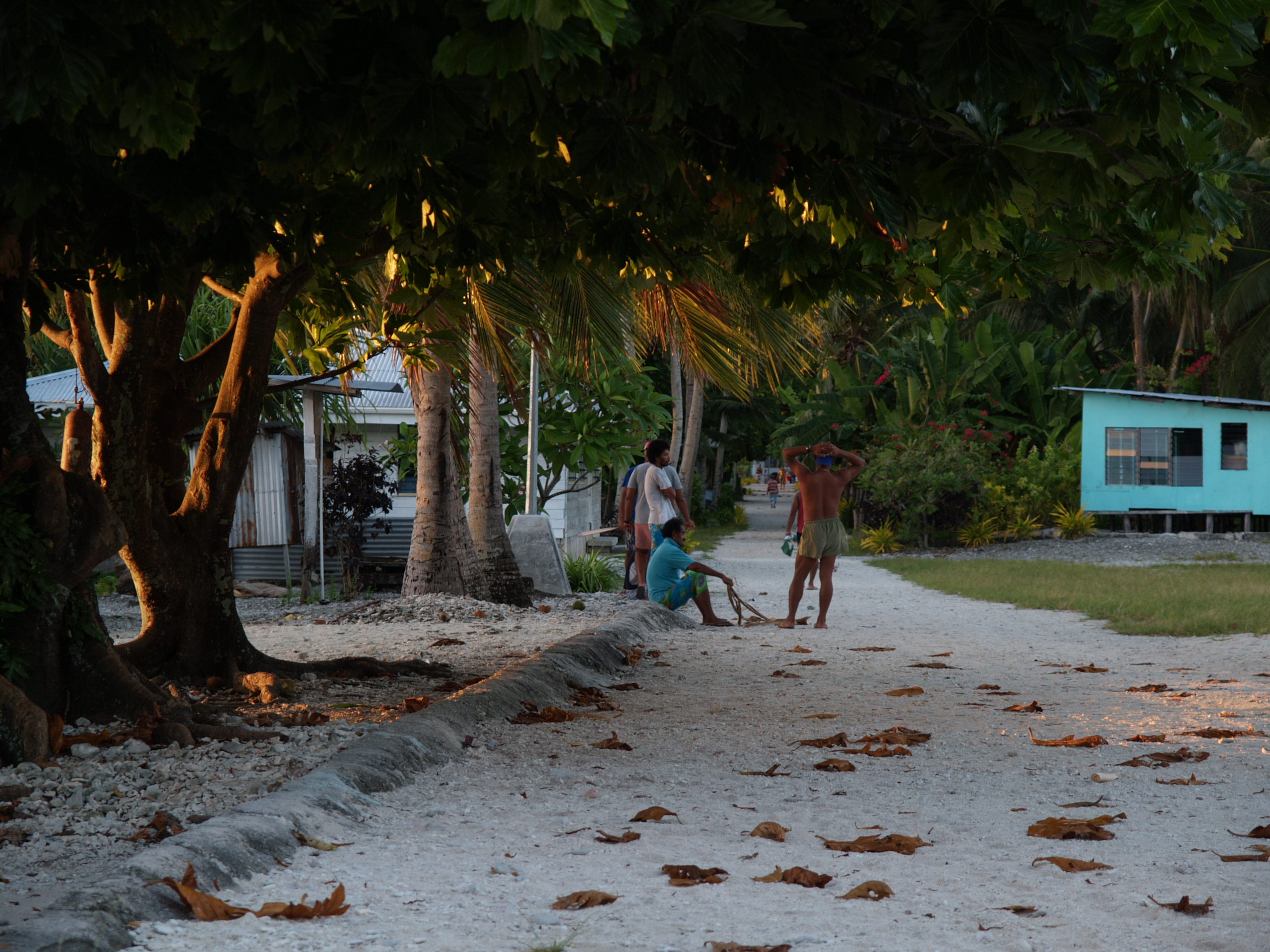
Atafu street at dawn

=== Internet domain name ===
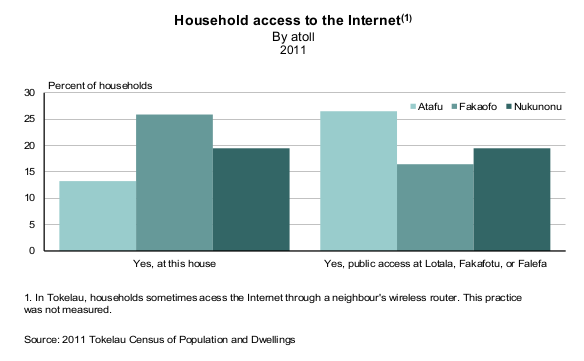
Access to internet in Tokelau, 2011

Tokelau has increased its GDP by more than 10% through registrations of domain names under its top-level domain, .tk. Registrations can be either free, in which case the user owns only usage rights and not the domain itself, or paid, which grants full rights. Free domains are pointed to Tokelau name servers, which redirects the domain via HTML frames to a specified address or to a specified A or NS record, and the redirection of up to 250 email addresses to an external address (not at a .tk domain).

In September 2003, Fakaofo became the first part of Tokelau with a high-speed Internet connection. Foundation Tokelau financed the project. Tokelau gave most domain names under its authority away to anyone for free to gain publicity for the territory. This has allowed the nation to gain enhanced telecommunications technologies, such as more computers and Internet access for Tokelauan residents. By 2012, there were about 120 computers, mostly laptops, and 1/6th of the economy consisted of income from .tk domain names.

According to a 2016 analysis of domain name registration performed by the .uk registrar Nominet using data from ZookNIC, tk domains are the "world's largest country-code domain ... almost as large as second and third place holders China (.cn) and Germany (.de) combined".

On 3 March 2023, Meta sued Freenom, the Dutch company responsible at the time for registration of .tk domains, for cybersquatting and trademark infringement, leading to a halt in new domain registrations, and in November 2023, ICANN terminated Freenom's registrar accreditation due to unresolved breaches. By February 2024, Freenom settled the lawsuit with Meta, announced its exit from the domain business, and by March 2024, 99% of Freenom domains became inaccessible, significantly affecting Cloudflare's hosted domains.

== Demographics ==
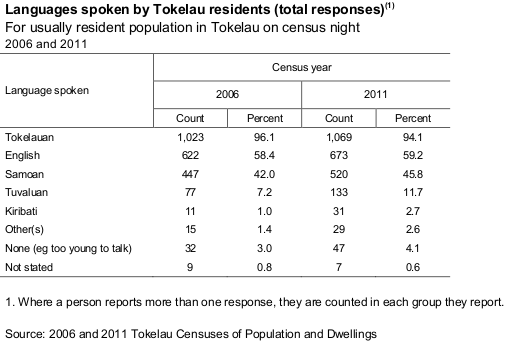
Language statistics in Tokelau, 2006 and 2011

According to the 2016 Tokelau Census, Tokelau has a de jure usually resident population of 1,499 people. The census shows a 6.2% increase in the de jure usually resident population between 2011 and 2016.

The nationals of Tokelau are called Tokelauans, and the major ethnic group is Polynesian; it has no recorded minority groups. About 84% of inhabitants are of wholly or partly Tokelauan ethnicity; people of Samoan ethnicity make up 6.7% of the population, and Tuvaluans 2.8%. The main language – spoken by over 90% of inhabitants – is Tokelauan, but almost 60% also speak English.

The less than 1,500 Polynesian inhabitants live in three villages. Their isolation and lack of resources greatly limits economic development and confines agriculture to the subsistence level. The very limited natural resources and overcrowding are contributing to emigration to New Zealand and Samoa. In the 2013 New Zealand census, more than 7,000 people identified as Tokelauan, almost five times as many as live in Tokelau itself. Depletion of tuna has made fishing for food more difficult.

A significant proportion (44.9% in 2016) of the population were born overseas, mostly in Samoa (15.3% of total population) and New Zealand (11.5%).

While slightly more females than males live on Atafu and Fakaofo, males make up 57% of Nukunonu residents. Only 9% of Tokelauans aged 40 or more have never been married. One-quarter of the population were born overseas; almost all the rest live on the same atoll they were born on. Most households own five or more pigs.

Despite its low income, Tokelau has a life expectancy of 69 years, comparable with other Oceania islands.

=== Structure of the population ===
Population by sex and age group (Census 18.X.2016):

Age group	Male	Female	Total	%
Total	652	633	1 285	100
0–4	74	65	139	10.82
5–9	75	75	150	11.67
10–14	72	65	137	10.66
15–19	63	53	116	9.03
20–24	54	39	93	7.24
25–29	39	47	86	6.69
30–34	36	43	79	6.15
35–39	35	27	62	4.82
40–44	35	40	75	5.84
45–49	41	40	81	6.30
50–54	27	36	63	4.90
55–59	33	20	53	4.12
60–64	31	23	54	4.20
65–69	14	23	37	2.88
70–74	14	11	25	1.95
75+	9	26	35	2.72
Age group	Male	Female	Total	Percent
0–14	221	205	426	33.15
15–64	394	368	762	59.30
65+	37	60	97	7.55

Population estimates by sex and age group (12.XII.2019) (Data refers to 2019 Tokelau population count.):

Age group	Male	Female	Total	%
Total	813	834	1 647	100
0–4	80	81	161	9.78
5–9	86	87	173	10.50
10–14	106	81	187	11.35
15–19	68	72	140	8.50
20–24	74	65	139	8.44
25–29	58	60	118	7.16
30–34	42	60	102	6.19
35–39	53	54	107	6.50
40–44	41	47	88	5.34
45–49	53	38	91	5.53
50–54	42	56	98	5.95
55–59	28	45	73	4.43
60–64	32	28	60	3.64
65–69	25	19	44	2.67
70–74	11	14	25	1.52
75–79	10	11	21	1.28
80–84	2	11	13	0.79
85–89	2	4	6	0.36
90+	0	1	1	0.06
Age group	Male	Female	Total	Percent
0–14	272	249	521	31.63
15–64	491	525	1 016	61.69
65+	50	60	110	6.68

=== Religion ===
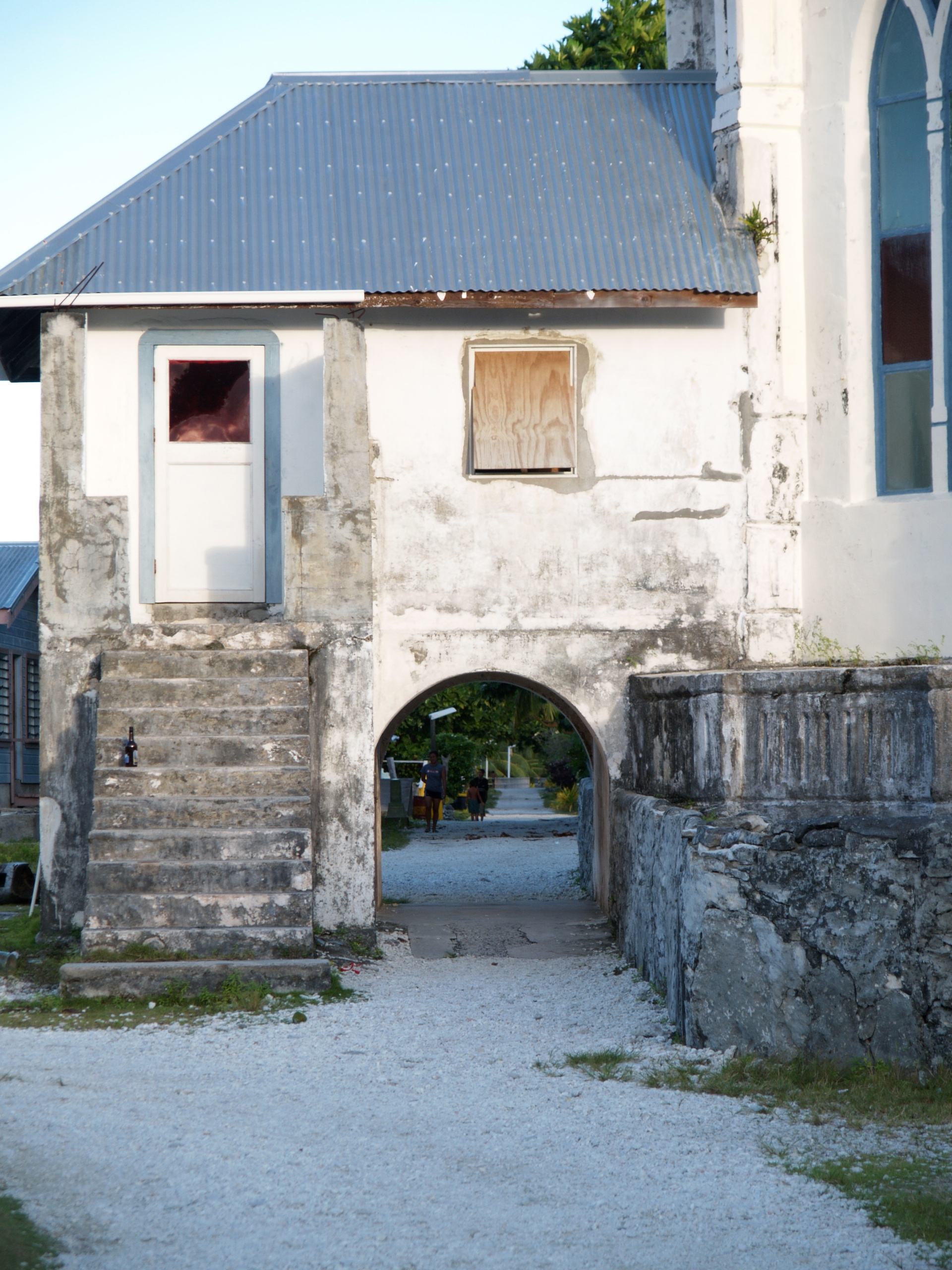
Nukunonu Church on Nukunonu in Tokelau

Tokelau is predominantly Christian with majority belonging to either Congregational Christian Church (Ekalehia Fakalapotopotoga Kelihiano Tokelau) or Roman Catholic.

In 2016, 50.4% of respondents belonged to Congregational Christian Church, 38.7% were Roman Catholic, 5.9% were Presbyterian, 4.2% were other Christian and 0.8% were unspecified. Majority of resident population of Atafu (78.3%) and Fakaofo (62.7%) identified as Congregational Christians. While the majority of residents in Nukunonu (81.8%) identified as Roman Catholic.

== Culture ==
=== Healthcare and education ===
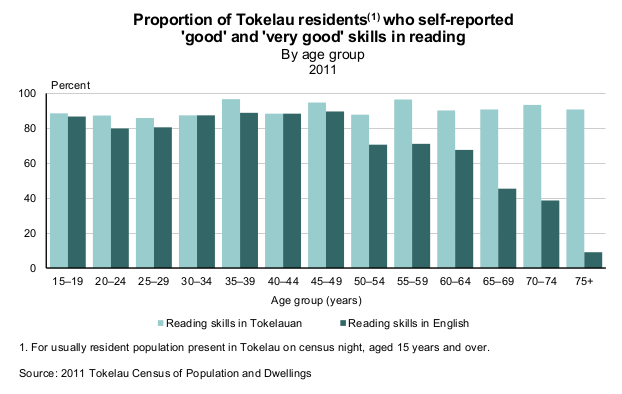
Literacy by age in Tokelau, 2011 census

Each atoll has a school and hospital. The health services have a Director of Health in Apia and a Chief Clinical Advisor who moves from atoll to atoll as required to assist the doctors attached to each hospital. In 2007, there was not always a doctor on each island and locums were appointed to fill the gaps.

Many Tokelauan youth travel to New Zealand to further their education, with students returning home and then heading off for another year of study.

=== Sport ===
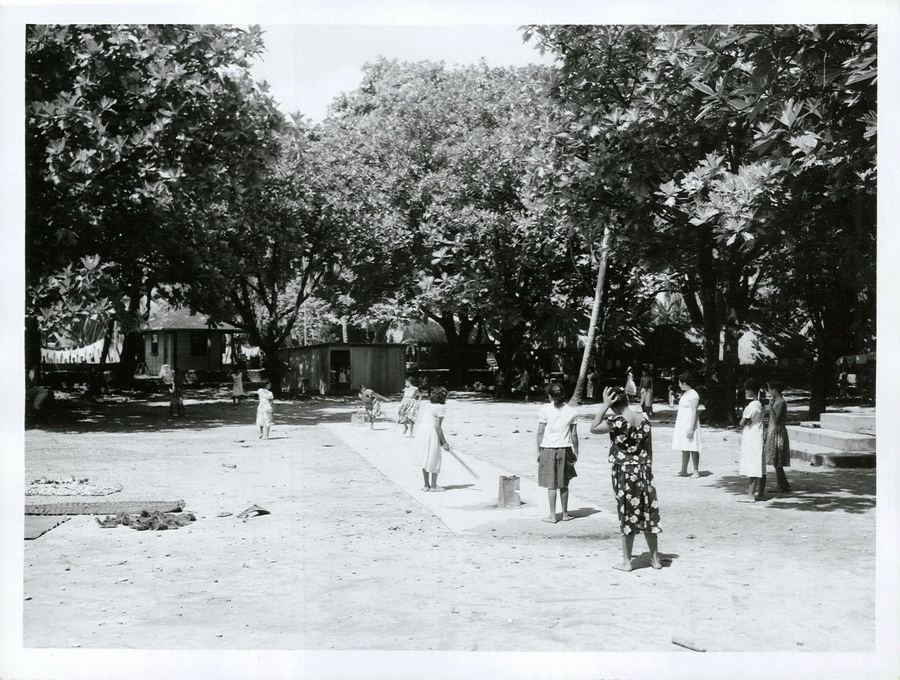
Cricket in Tokelau, 1966

Due to its small size, Tokelau is unaffiliated to most international sports organisations, and rarely takes part in international events. The only significant international competition Tokelau takes part in is the Pacific Games. Tokelau won its first-ever gold medals at the 2007 Pacific Games in Apia, winning a total of five medals (three gold, a silver and a bronze), all in lawn bowls, and finishing 12th (out of 22) on the overall medal table. This included two gold medals for Violina Linda Pedro (in the women's pairs and the women's singles), making her Tokelau's most successful individual athlete to date.

In October 2010, table tennis became "the first sport in Tokelau to be granted membership at a Continental or World level", when the Tokelau Table Tennis Association was formally established and became the 23rd member of the Oceania Table Tennis Federation. Tokelau is also a member of United World Wrestling.

Tokelau was due to take part, for the first time, in the 2010 Commonwealth Games, in Delhi, but, for unknown reasons, ultimately did not do so. In 2018, Tokelau was noted to be ineligible for the Commonwealth Games until it became affiliated to at least five international sport federations.

Tokelau has a National Sports Federation, and a significant sporting event is the Tokelau Games, which are held yearly. When they are held, "all of Tokelau virtually stands still", as "[i]n excess of 50% of the population take part and all work and school stops at the time". The 2010 Games included competitions in rugby sevens, netball and kilikiti, alongside "a cultural evening [...] where each atoll showcases their traditional songs and dances".

Netball is thought to have been introduced to Tokelau by the British, but became more popular when New Zealand's government took over the territory. The sport is often played during inter-island sport competitions, alongside other sports like rugby league and volleyball.

In Tokelau, there are two levels to the football league. From Fale, Fakaofo, two of the best clubs are Hakava Club and Matalele Club.

== Telecommunications ==
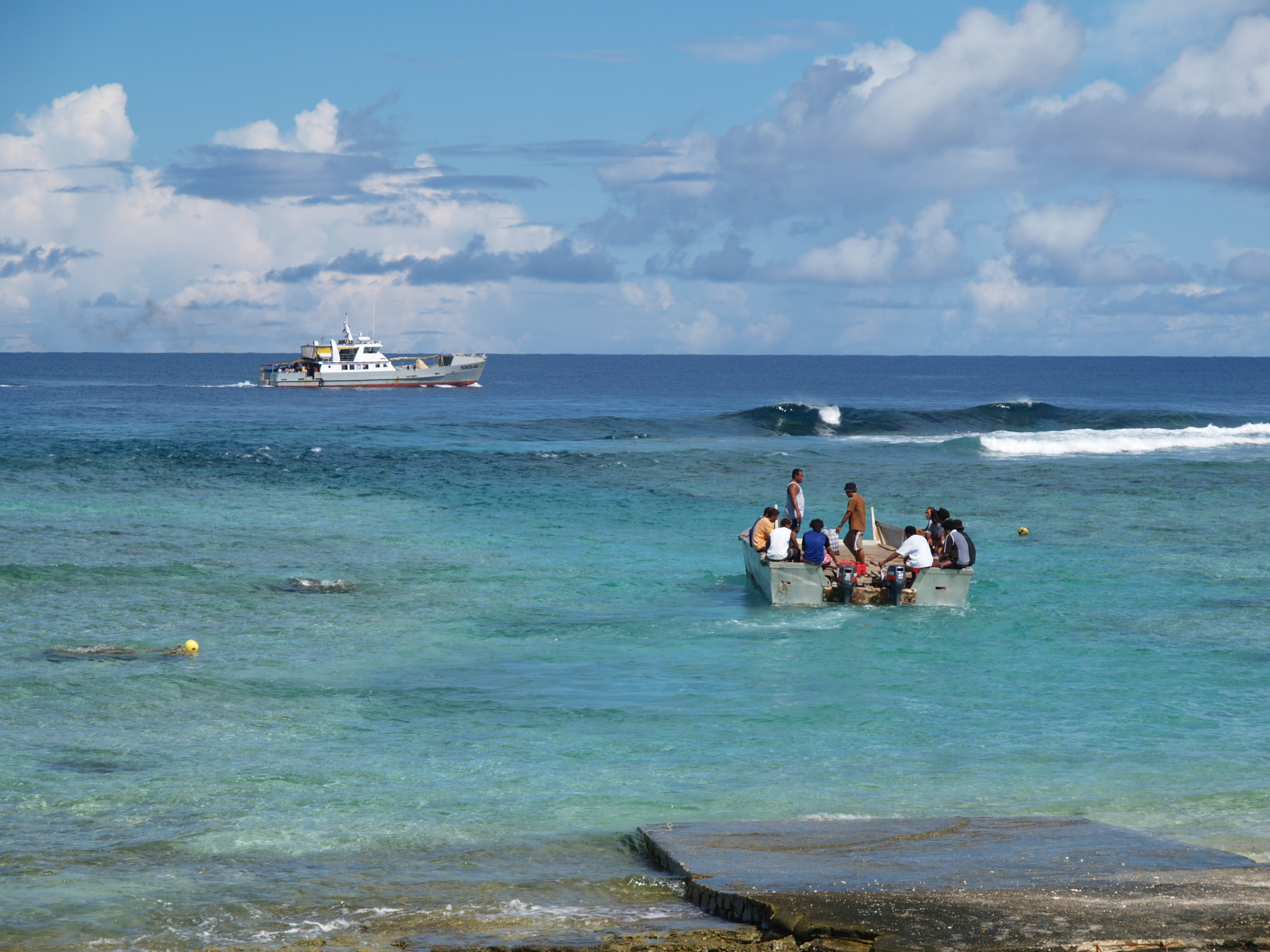
A barge leaves the landing ramp in Nukunonu to collect cargo and passengers from the MV Tokelau.

Tokelau has a radio telephone service between the islands and to Samoa. In 1997, a government-regulated telephone service (TeleTok) with three satellite earth stations was established, making Tokelau the last place in the world connected via phone. Each atoll has a radio-broadcast station that broadcasts shipping and weather reports and every household has a radio or access to one. News is disseminated through the government newsletter Te Vakai.

In 2019, Tokelau agreed to connect to Southern Cross Cable's 60 Tbps NEXT subsea cable stretching between Australia, New Zealand, and the United States In September 2021, the island was connected to the new cable and services were launched in July 2022, granting it access to a network of 400GbE telecommunications service to datacenters around the world.

Tokelau has the international calling code of 690, and has had five-digit telephone numbers from November 2015 (the existing four-digit numbers were prefixed by the digit "2").

Tokelau administers the .tk country code top-level domain.

== Transportation ==
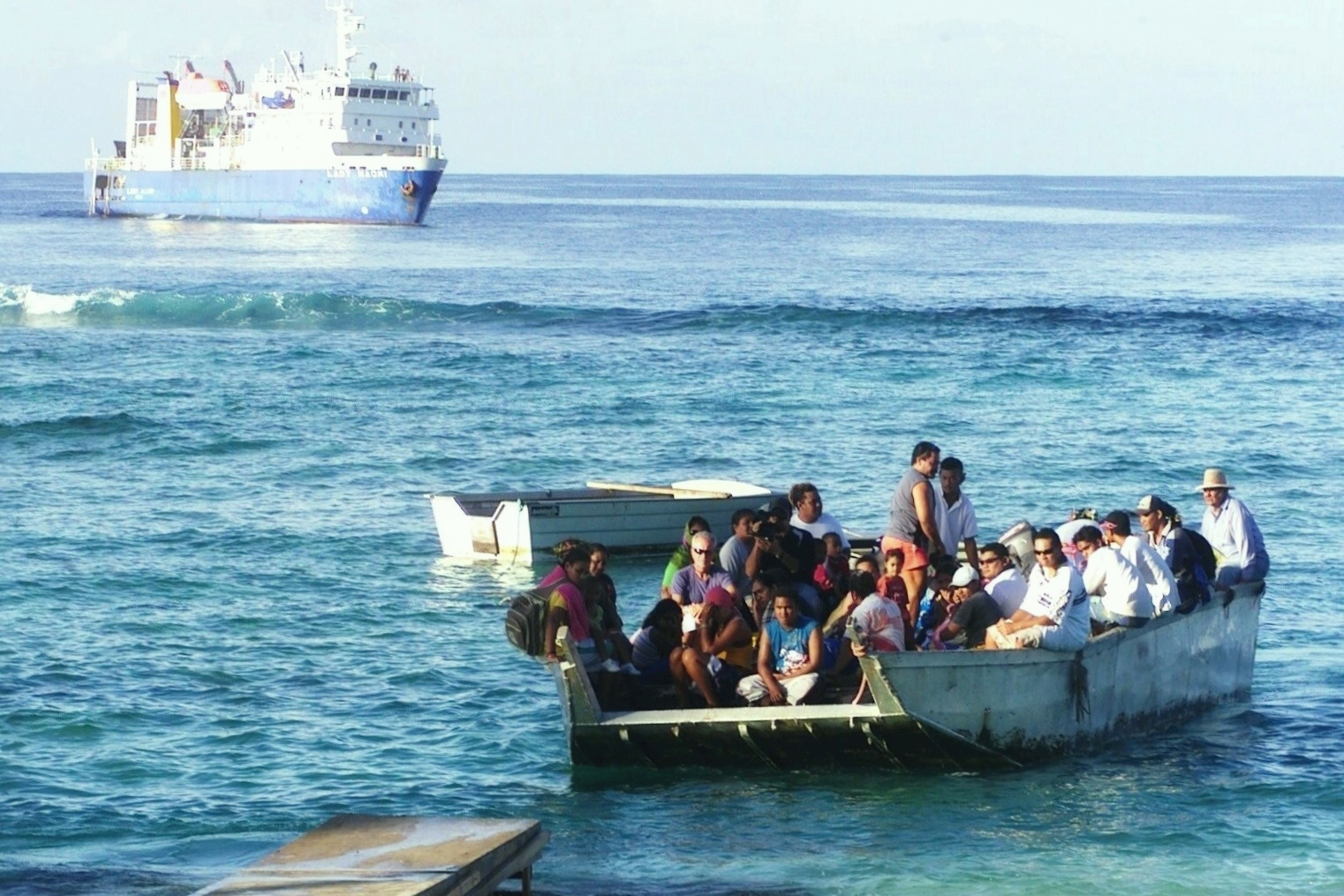
Passengers arriving in Tokelau off a ferry from Samoa. There is no harbour in Tokelau, so passengers need to take a landing barge across the reef to get to shore.

Tokelau is served by the MV Mataliki, delivered new in 2016 as a replacement of the smaller MV Tokelau and jointly managed by the Tokelau Transport Department and the company Transport and Marine. The vessel, which has a capacity of 60 passengers on international cruises and 120 for transport between the atolls of Tokelau, operates fortnightly between Tokelau and Apia, with the trip taking a little over a day. A dedicated cargo vessel, the MV Kalopaga, entered service in 2018 and replaced chartered freight vessels.

Ships load and unload cargo by motoring up to the down-wind (leeward) side of the islet, where the people live and maintain the station. A landing barge is motored out to transfer cargo to or from the shore. On returning to shore, the barge negotiates a narrow channel through the reef to the beach. Usually this landing is subject to ocean swell and beaching requires considerable skill and, often, coral abrasions to bodies. When bad weather prevents the barge making the trip, the ship stands off to wait for suitable weather or goes off to one of the other atolls to attempt to load or unload its passengers or cargo, or both.

There is no airport in Tokelau, so boats are the main means of travel and transport. Some seaplanes and amphibious aircraft are able to land in the island's lagoons. An airstrip was considered by the New Zealand Government in 2010. In 2016, plans to link the atolls with Samoa by helicopter had to be abandoned because of high costs, leading in the following years to renewed calls to the New Zealand government for help with establishing air services. As of 2022, it was reported that the airport project – funded by the New Zealand government – was moving forward. In January 2026, the New Zealand government cancelled plans to build an airport on Tokelau, citing high costs and the adverse environmental impact.

== See also ==
- Badge of Tokelau
- Outline of Tokelau
