= Jennings =

Jennings is a surname of early medieval English origin (also the Anglicised version of the Irish surnames Mac Sheóinín or MacJonin). Notable people with the surname include:

- Jennings (Swedish noble family)

== A–G ==
- Adam Jennings (born 1982), American football player
- Al Jennings (1863–1961), American attorney in Oklahoma Territory, train robber and silent film star
- Alex Jennings (born 1957), British actor
- Andrew Jennings (1943–2022), British investigative journalist
- Anfernee Jennings (born 1997), American football player
- Asa Jennings (1877–1933), American who commanded the evacuation of refugees after the Great Fire of Smyrna
- Bernard Jennings (1929–2017), British local historian and adult educationist
- Billy Jennings (born 1952), English footballer
- Billy Jennings (Welsh footballer) (1893–1968), Welsh footballer
- Brandon Jennings (born 1989), American basketball player
- Brent Jennings (born 1951), American actor
- Brian Jennings, American football player
- Bryan Frederick Jennings, American convicted child murderer
- Bryant Jennings, American boxer
- C. Carl Jennings (1910–2003), American blacksmith, and artist
- Cal Jennings, American soccer player
- Charles Edward Jennings (1751–1799), Irish-born French general
- Charles Jennings (journalist) (1908–1973), Canadian journalist
- Chris Jennings (journalist), American journalist and author
- Christine Jennings (born 1945), American politician
- Claudia Jennings (1949–1979), American model and actress
- Clyde Jennings (1916–2006), Florida philatelist
- Desmond Jennings (born 1986), American baseball player
- Desmond Domnique Jennings (1971–1999), American serial killer
- Donovan Jennings (born 1999), American football player
- D. Rolland Jennings (born 1951), American politician
- Edward Jennings (VC) (1820–1889), Irish recipient of the Victoria Cross
- Edward H. Jennings (1937–2019), tenth president of Ohio State University
- Ed Jennings (born 1968), Florida politician
- Edward Jennings (rowing) (1898–1975), American coxswain
- Elizabeth Jennings (1926–2001), English poet
- Elizabeth Jennings Graham (1827–1901), American black civil rights activist and teacher
- Ernie Jennings (born 1949), American football player
- Francis Jennings, American historian
- Garth Jennings (born 1972), English film director, screenwriter, producer, actor and writer
- Gary Jennings (1928–1999), American author
- Gary Jennings Jr. (born 1997), American football player
- Gavin Jennings (born 1957), Victorian Politician
- George Jennings (1810–1882), pioneering British sanitary engineer
- Gerald H. Jennings, ichthyologist and author
- Grant Jennings, (born 1965), Canadian ice hockey player
- Greg Jennings, American football player

== H–L ==
- Hal B. Jennings (1915–2008), US Army surgeon general
- Henry Jennings, British privateer
- Henry Constantine Jennings, English antiquarian
- Herbert Spencer Jennings, zoologist, geneticist and eugenicist
- Hilde Jennings (1906–?), German actress
- Hughie Jennings, American baseball player
- Humphrey Jennings (1907–1950), English filmmaker
- Ivor Jennings (1903–1965), British lawyer
- J. B. Jennings, American politician
- Jack Jennings (1919–2024), British World War II veteran
- James Jennings (disambiguation), several people
- Jauan Jennings (born 1997), American football player
- Jazz Jennings (born 2000), American transgender activist
- Jean Jennings (1954–2024), American journalist, publisher and television personality
- Jeremy Jennings, English political theorist
- Jesse D. Jennings (1909–1997), American archaeologist
- Joanne Jennings (born 1969), British high jumper
- John Jennings (disambiguation), several people
- Jonas Jennings, American football player
- Jonathan Jennings, first governor of Indiana
- J. T. W. Jennings, 20th century architect
- Kate Jennings (1948–2021), Australian writer
- Kathy Jennings (1953 - ) American Lawyer and Politician
- Keaton Jennings, English cricketer
- Keith Jennings (American football) (born 1966), American football player
- Keith Jennings (basketball) (born 1968), American basketball player and coach
- Keith R. Jennings (born 1932), English chemist
- Keith Jennings (cricketer) (born 1953), English cricketer
- Ken Jennings, American game show host and prior to hosting it, was the first Jeopardy! superchampion
- Kenneth Jennings (disambiguation), several people
- Kerri Walsh Jennings (1978–), American beach volleyball player
- La Vinia Delois Jennings, American literary scholar
- Leonard Jennings (sculptor), English sculptor and British Army officer
- Leonard Frank Jennings, English cricketer and Royal Air Force officer
- Luke Jennings, British author of the novel Codename Villanelle
- Lyfe Jennings, American musician
- Lynn Jennings, American distance runner

== M–Z ==
- M. D. Jennings, American football player
- Marlene Jennings, Canadian politician
- Mason Jennings, American musician
- Marvin Jennings, American convicted murderer
- Maureen Jennings (born 1939), British Canadian writer
- Maxine Jennings (1909–1991), American actress
- Michael Jennings (disambiguation), several people
- Morley Jennings (1890–1985), American college sports coach
- Newell Jennings (1883–1965), Associate Justice of the Connecticut Supreme Court
- Nicholas R. Jennings (born 1965), American director, artist, writer, producer
- Nicky Jennings (1946–2016), English footballer
- Nick Jennings (born 1966), English Regius Professor of computer science
- Nicolette Jennings (born 1996), American model, beauty pageant titleholder (Miss Florida USA 2019 and Top 10 finalist Miss USA 2019)
- Owen Jennings, New Zealand politician
- Pat Jennings, Northern Irish footballer
- Patrick Jennings (1831–1897), Australian politician
- Paul Jennings (born 1943), Australian children's author
- Paul Jennings (1918–1989), English humorist
- Paul Jennings (1799–1874), American slave owned by President James Madison
- Peter Jennings (1938–2005), ABC News anchor and newsman
- Peter Jennings (serjeant-at-arms) (born 1934), British public servant
- Peter R. Jennings (born 1950), Canadian scientist and entrepreneur
- Philip Jennings (The Americans), fictional character in the 2010s American television drama series The Americans
- Philip Jennings (Queenborough MP) (c. 1679–1740), English lawyer and politician, MP for Queenborough 1715–22
- Sir Philip Jennings-Clerke, 1st Baronet (c. 1722 – January 1788), known as Philip Jennings until the 1760s, MP for Totnes 1768–88
- Renz L. Jennings (1899–1983), Associate Justice of the Arizona Supreme Court
- Richard E. Jennings (1927–1991), British comic book artist
- Richard Jennings (c. 1619–1668), British politician
- Rick Jennings (born 1953), American football player
- Robert Spears-Jennings (born 2004), American football player
- Robert Yewdall Jennings (1913–2004), English jurist
- Sarah Jennings (1660–1744), 1st Duchess of Marlborough
- Shooter Jennings (born 1979), American musician
- Stanford Jennings, American football player
- Steve Jennings (born 1984), English footballer
- Stephen Arthur Jennings, Canadian mathematician
- Suʻa Alexander Eli Jennings, American Samoan politician
- Talbot Jennings (1894–1985), American playwright and screenwriter
- Ted Jennings (born 1990), American football player
- Terrell Jennings (born 2001), American football player
- Theodore Jennings (1942–2020), American author
- Tiare Jennings (born 2002), American softball player
- Tim Jennings (born 1983), American football player
- Tom Jennings (born 1955), creator of FidoNet
- Toni Jennings (born 1949), American politician
- Waylon Jennings (1937–2002), American country music singer
- Will Jennings (1944–2024), American songwriter
- William Dale Jennings (1917–2000), American author
- William M. Jennings (1920–1981), American businessman and hockey team owner
- William Nicholson Jennings (1860–1946), American photographer
- W. Pat Jennings (1919–1994), U.S. Representative from Virginia
- William Sherman Jennings (1863–1920), governor of Florida
- Zilpher Jennings (1928–1961), American Samoan politician

== See also ==
- Justice Jennings (disambiguation)
- William Jennings Bryan
