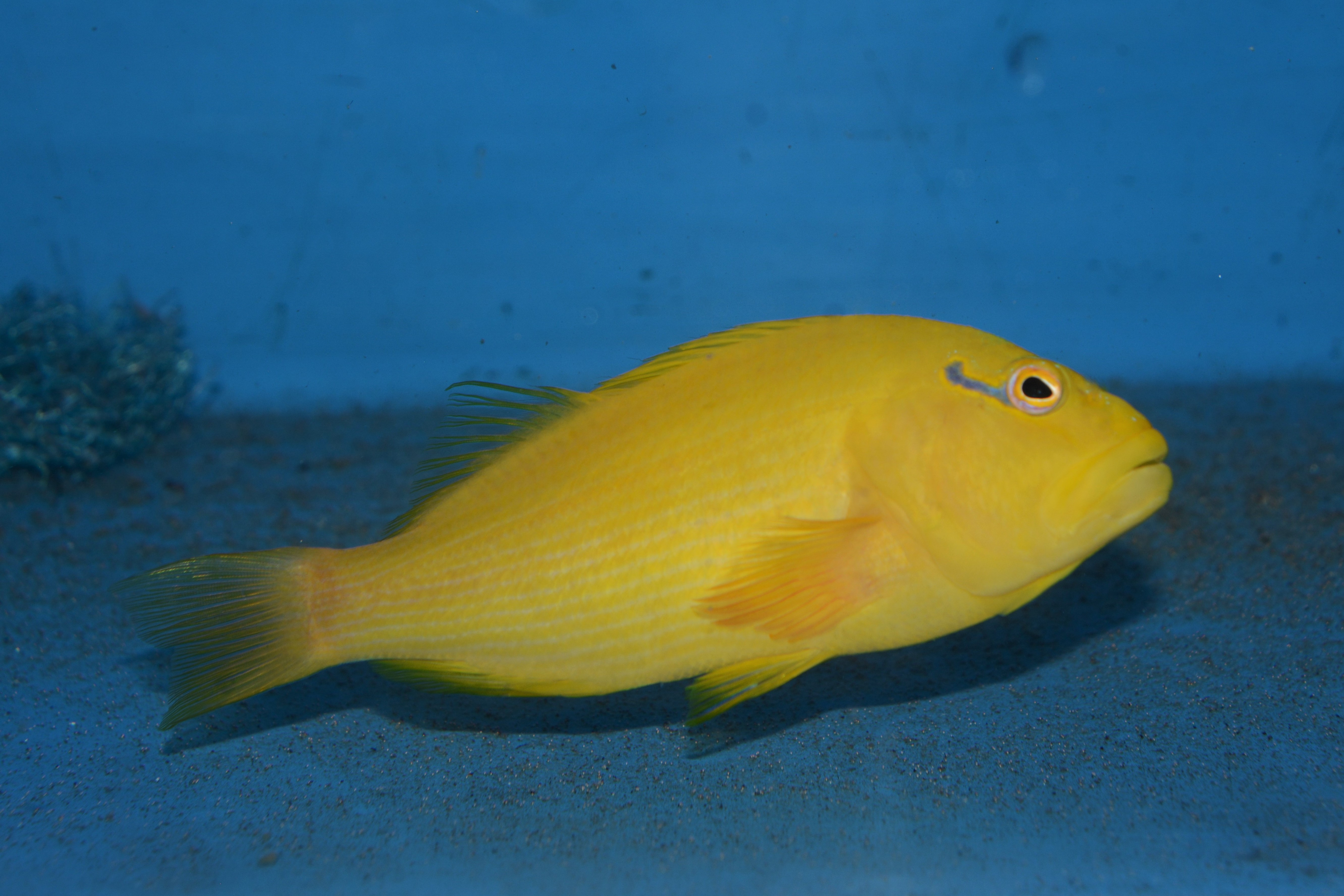

Conservation status
- Least Concern (IUCN 3.1)

Scientific classification
- Kingdom: Animalia
- Phylum: Chordata
- Class: Actinopterygii
- Order: Centrarchiformes
- Family: Cirrhitidae
- Genus: Paracirrhites
- Species: P. xanthus

Binomial name
- Paracirrhites xanthus J. E. Randall, 1963

= Paracirrhites xanthus =

Species of fish

Paracirrhites xanthus, the yellow hawkfish or the blueline yellow hawkfish, is a species of marine ray-finned fish, a hawkfish belonging to the family Cirrhitidae. it is found in the eastern central Pacific. It can be found in the aquarium trade.

== Taxonomy ==
Paracirrhites xanthus was first formally described in 1963 by the American ichthyologist John Ernest Randall with the type locality given as Takapoto Atoll in the Tuamotu Islands. This species is one of three species of little known, small, largely sympatric and very similar Paracirrhites hawkfishes from Polynesia, the other two being P. bicolor and P. nisus. These were all described by John E. Randall in 1963. It has been suggested that these are actually colour morphs of the same polymorphic species which has undergone some introgression of genes from the widespread and also sympatric arc-eye hawkfish (P. arcatus). The specific name xanthus means "yellow", a reference to the colour of this species.

== Description ==
Paracirrhites xanthus has a body in which the depth of the body is just under 40% of its standard length. The dorsal fin contains 10 spines and 11 soft rays, the anterior dorsal fin spines have cirri on their tips. The anal fin has 3 spines and 6 soft rays while the pectoral fin has the lower 7 fin rays unbranched and robust. The caudal fin is truncate. This species attains a maximum recorded total length of 12 cm (4.7 in). The overall colour is vivid yellow with indistinct horizontal lines and a short vioet-blue stripe behind the eye.

== Distribution and habitat ==
Paracirrhites xanthus is found in the western central Pacific Ocean. It has been found in French Polynesia in the Tuamotu Archipelago, Marquesas Islands and Society Islands; at the Cook Islands and in Kiribati at the Phoenix Islands, Line Islands and Caroline Atoll, as well as in American Samoa at Swains Island. It s found at depths between 2 and 25 m (6 ft 7 in and 82 ft 0 in) on exposed outer reefs.

== Biology ==
Paracirrhites xanthus is a solitary species which sits on the top of corals from where it ambushes its prey, mostly crustaceans.

== Utlisation ==
Paracirrhites xanthus is collected for the aquarium trade. It is mostly available within that trade in Japan where it commands high prices. They are rarely available in Europe or North America.
