= 1953 American Samoan legislative election =

Legislative elections were held in American Samoa between 19 and 24 January 1953, the first under universal suffrage.

== Background ==
In 1948 a bicameral Fono was created with a 12-member House of Ali'i and a 54-member House of Representatives. In 1952 the legislature was reorganised into a 15-member Senate and an 18-member House of Representatives. The 18 members of the House of Representatives were elected by the secret ballot, while the 15 members of the Senate were chosen through open meetings, one from each of the 15 counties.

Of the estimated 7,300 eligible votes, 4,675 people registered to vote. Voters were required to have lived in their district for at least five years to register, with the voting age set at 18. The campaign started on 5 January. The Western Samoan government sent observers to monitor the elections.

== Results ==
3,770 voters cast votes in the election. For the first time, women were elected, with Zilpher Jennings and Mabel Reid winning seats in the House of Representatives. Twelve of the eighteen members of the House of Representatives were non-chiefs.
