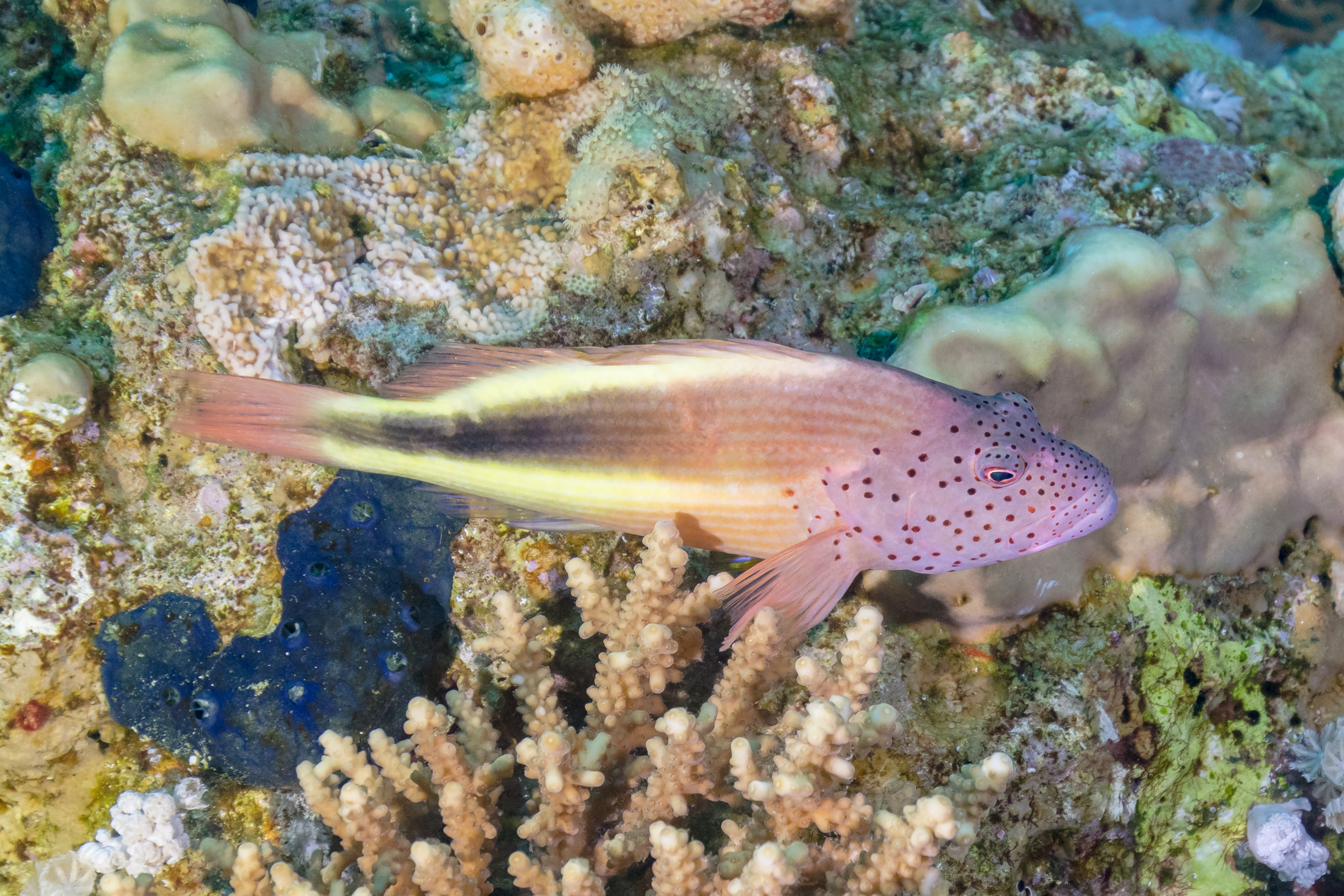

Conservation status
- Least Concern (IUCN 3.1)

Scientific classification
- Kingdom: Animalia
- Phylum: Chordata
- Class: Actinopterygii
- Order: Centrarchiformes
- Family: Cirrhitidae
- Genus: Paracirrhites
- Species: P. forsteri

Binomial name
- Paracirrhites forsteri (J. G. Schneider, 1801)

Synonyms
- Grammistes forsteri J. G. Schneider, 1801; Paracirrhites typee J. E. Randall, 1963

= Blackside hawkfish =

Species of fish

The black-side hawkfish (Paracirrhites forsteri), freckled hawkfish or Forster's hawkfish, is a species of marine ray-finned fish, a hawkfish belonging to the family Cirrhitidae. It is from the Indo-Pacific. It is occasionally found in the aquarium trade and is also of minor importance to local commercial fisheries. It grows to a total length of 22 cm (9 in).

== Taxonomy ==
The blackside hawkfish was first formally described in 1801 as Grammistes forsteri by the French naturalist Johann Gottlob Theaenus Schneider with the type locality given as Vaitahu on Tahuata Island in the Marquesas Islands. The specific name honours the Polish-born German naturalist Johann Reinhold Forster, who was a naturalist aboard James Cook's second voyage on HMS Resolution and who described this species as "Perca taeniatus" in an unpublished manuscript.

== Description ==
The blackside hawkfish reaches to a maximum total length of about 22 cm (9 in). The dorsal fin has ten spines and eleven soft rays, while the anal fin has three spines and six soft rays. There is considerable variation in the colouring both among adults and as a result of changes during growth. The main colour is usually yellowish but there is a broad black or dark brown lateral band, mainly on the rear half of the body. The sides of the head and the front of the body are whitish or grey, with red speckles. In Asia, juveniles may be reddish dorsally, while in Oceania they tend to have golden-green upper parts and white underparts.

== Distribution ==
The blackside hawkfish is native to the tropical and sub-tropical Indo-Pacific Ocean. Its range extends from East Africa and the Red Sea to Japan, New Caledonia and Australasia. In Australia its range extends from the northwest of Western Australia round the north of the country to the border of Queensland and New South Wales. It is found on the seaward side of reefs and on soft-bottomed lagoons to depths of 30 m (100 ft) and more.

== Ecology ==
The black-sided hawkfish is an ambush predator; it usually lies in wait on a head of coral, propped up by its stiff pectoral fins, ready to dart out at passing crustaceans or small fish. It is mainly a solitary fish, but may be seen in pairs or may form small harems with one dominant male and several females. Like other members of the family, it is a sequential hermaphrodite; adults start life as females but the largest female in a group changes sex to a male if that position is vacated.

== Gallery ==
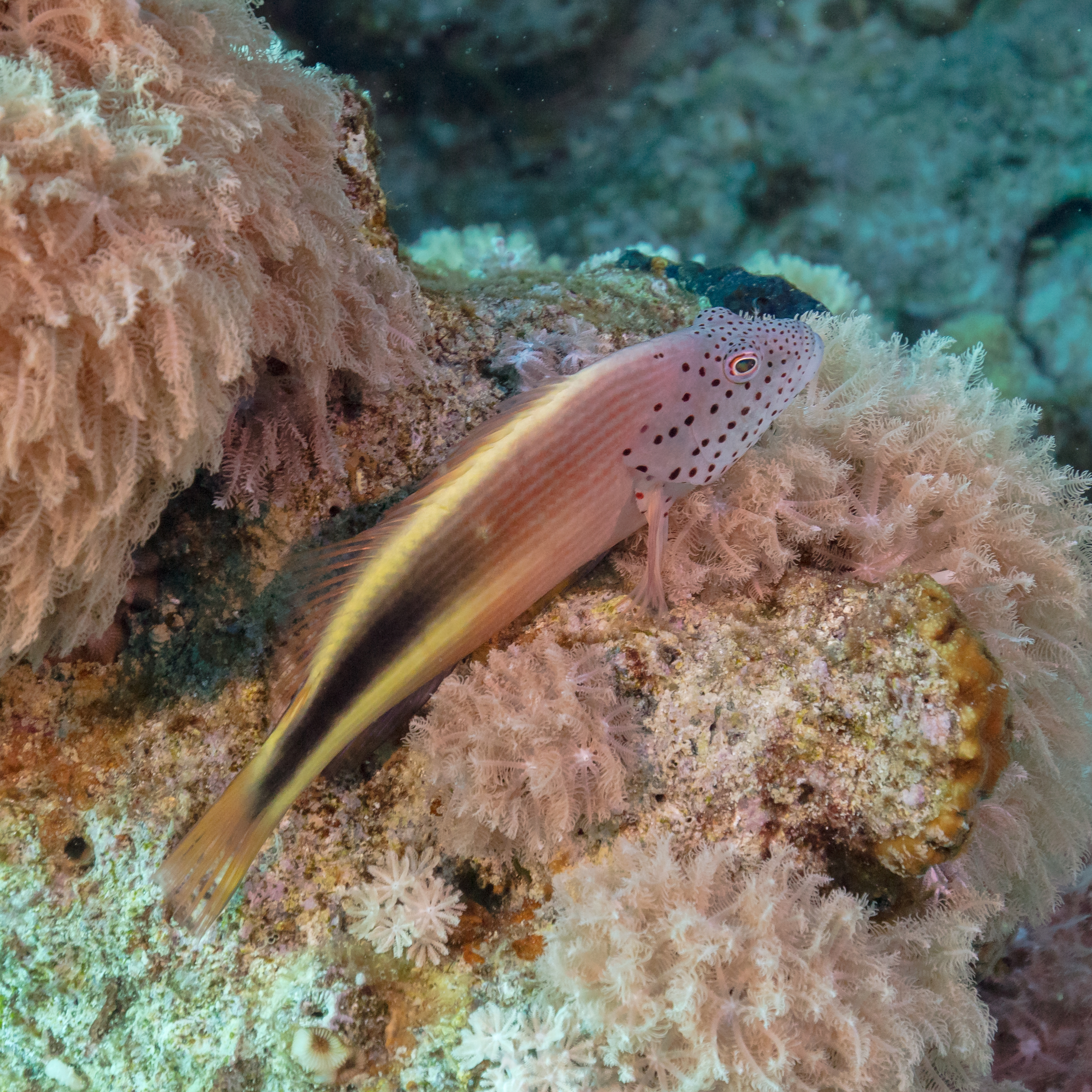
Juvenile

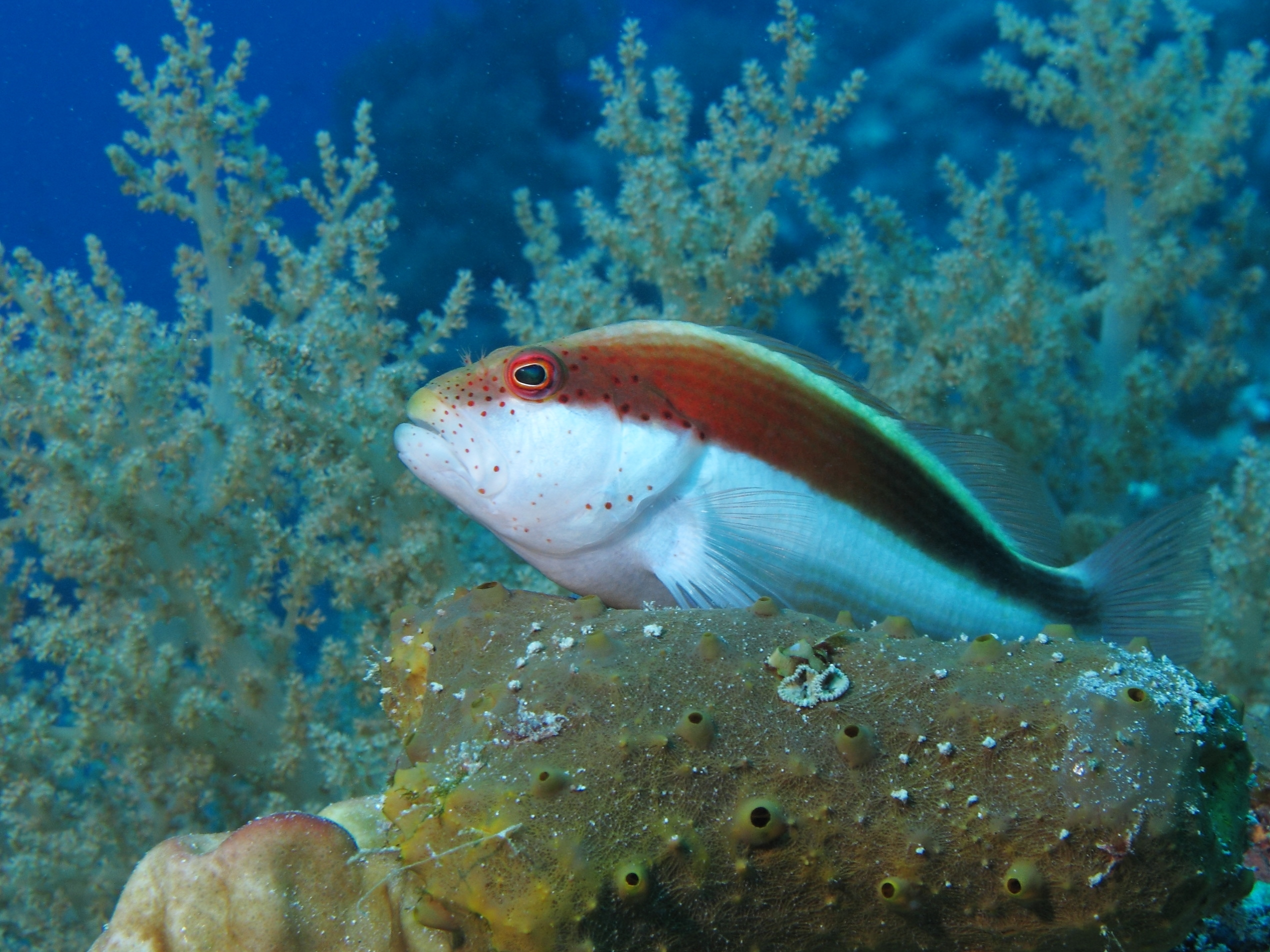
Adult (red colouration)

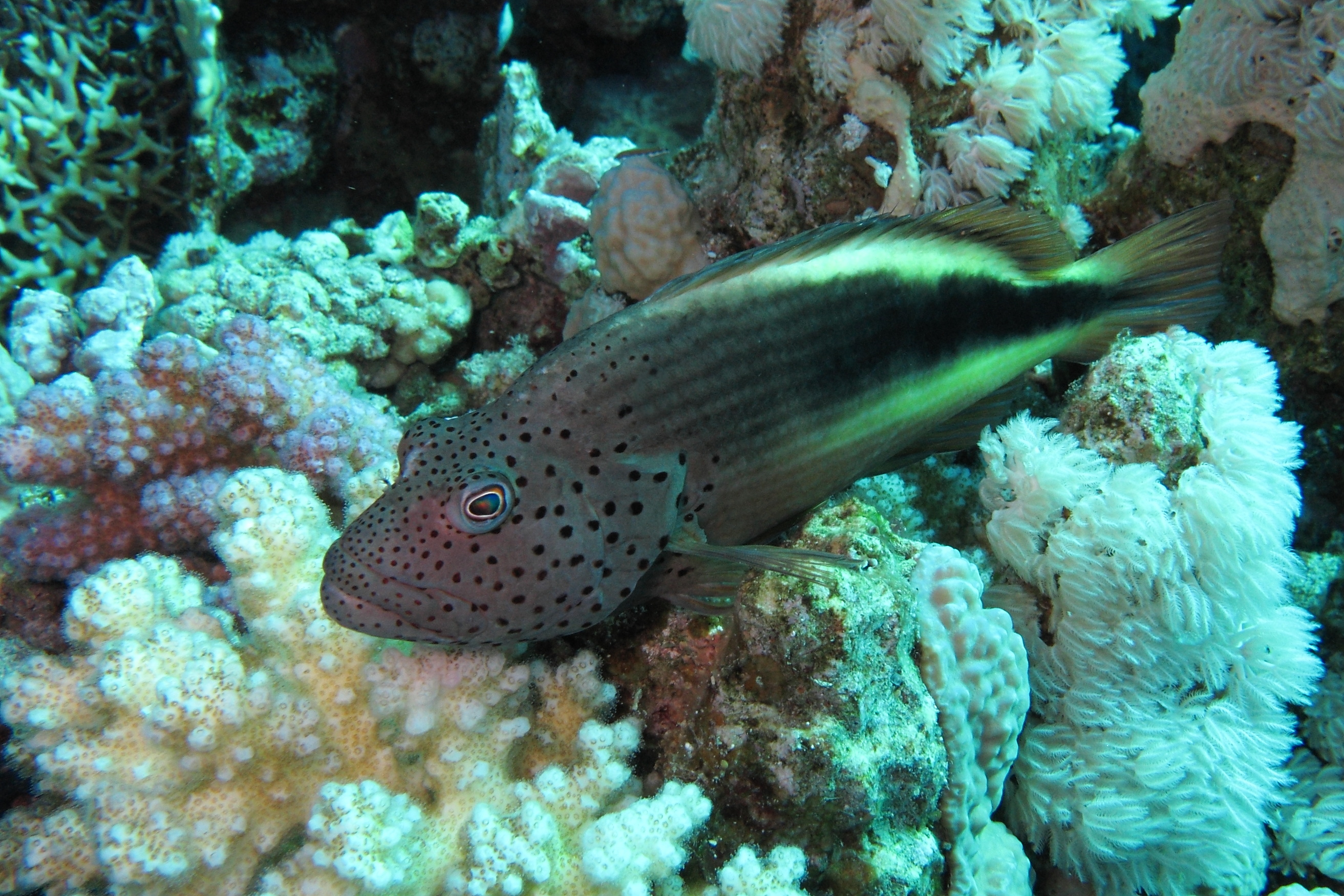
Adult (black colouration)

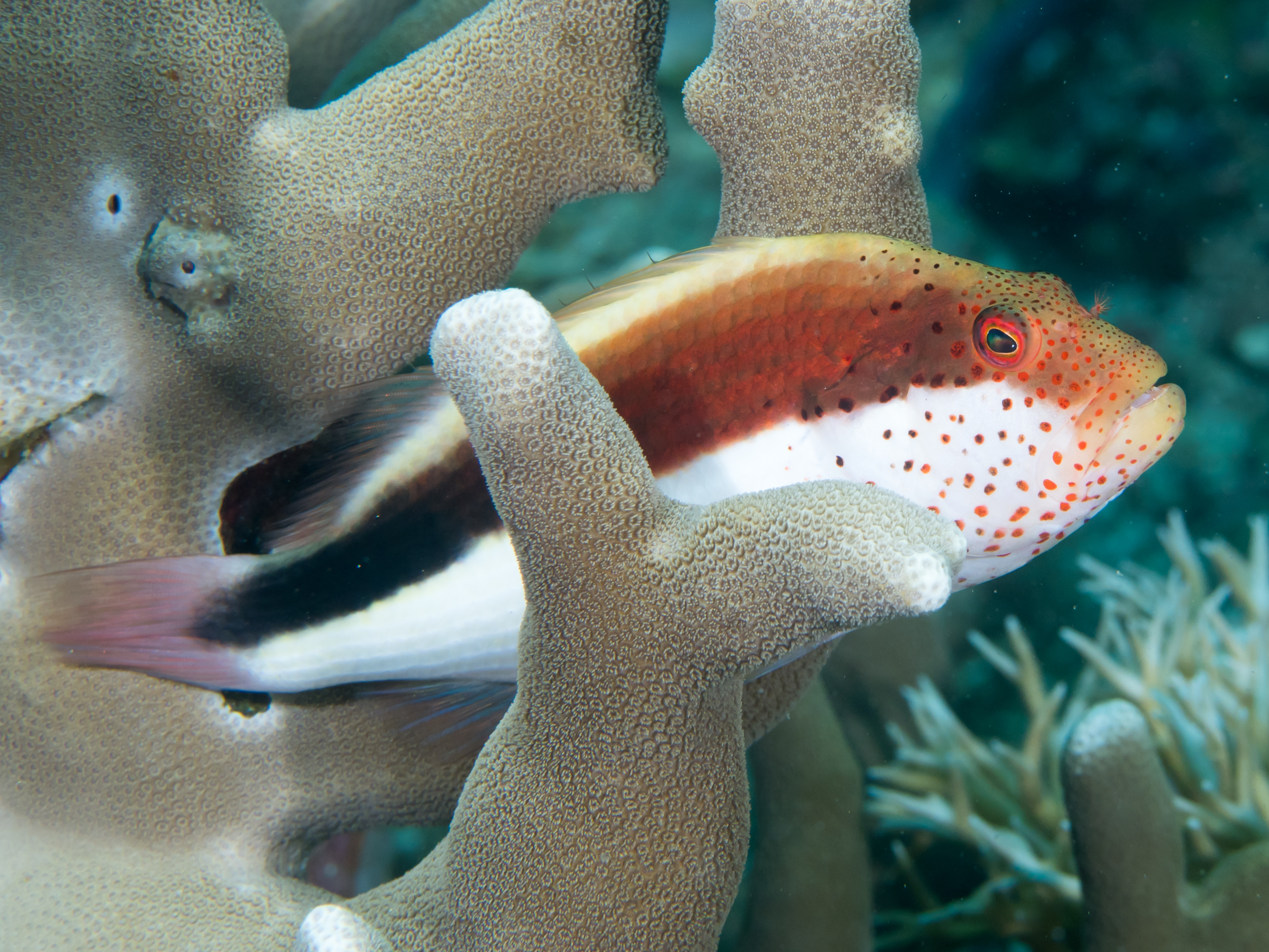
Freckled hawkfish in Raja Ampat, 2019

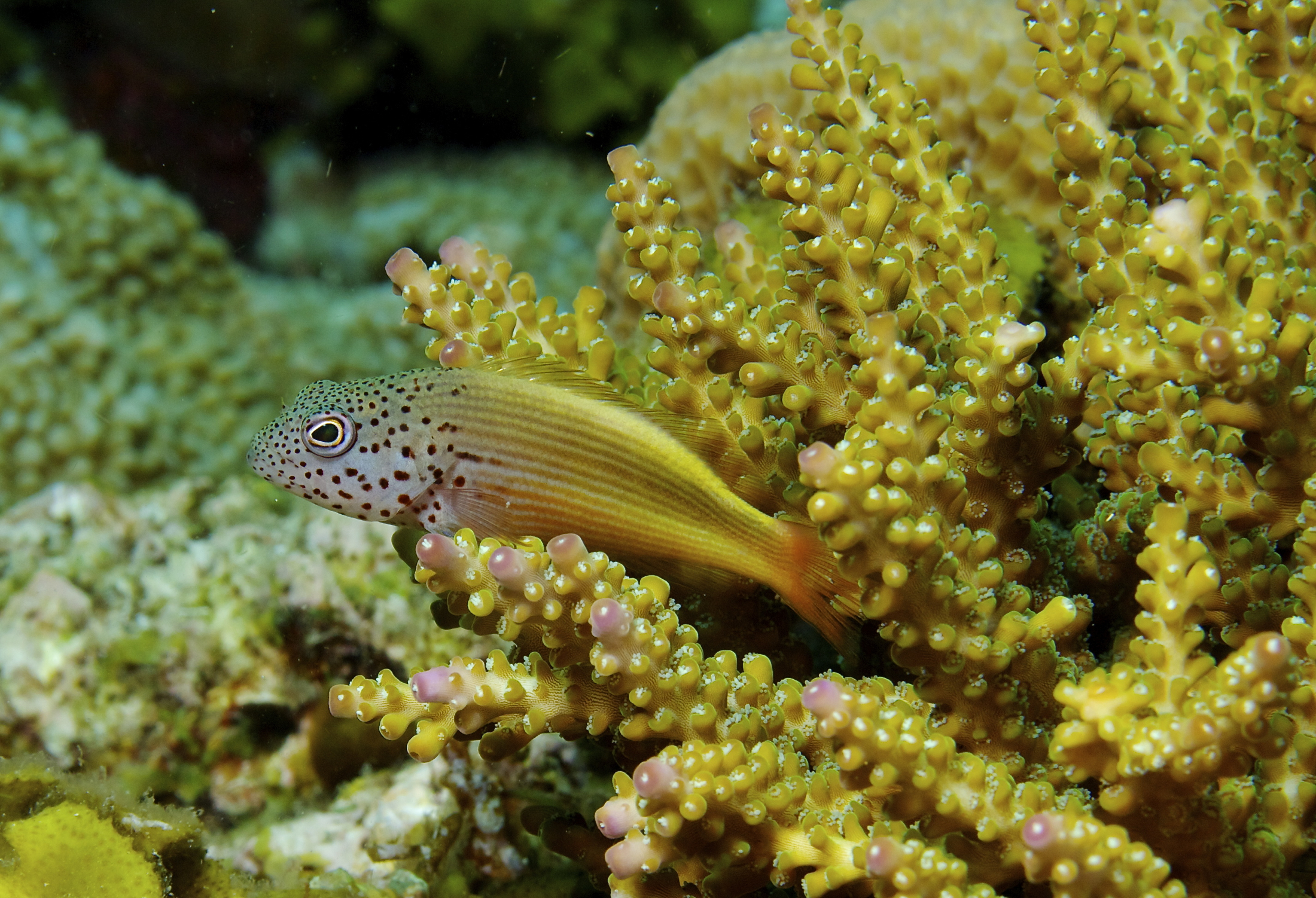
Forsters Hawkfish juvenile at Papua New Guinea, 2013

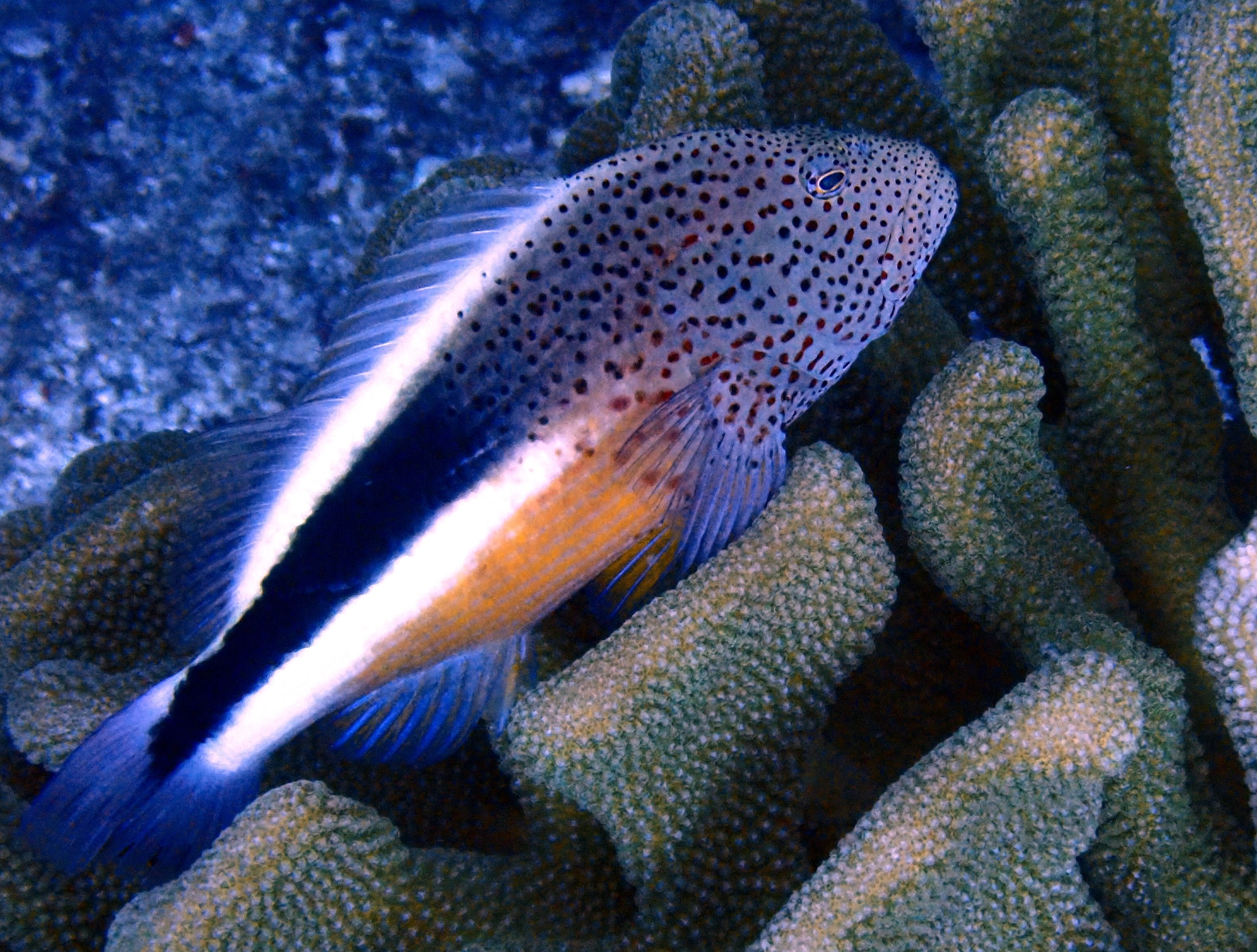
Purple Forsters Hawkfish in Maui, Hawaii, 2020
