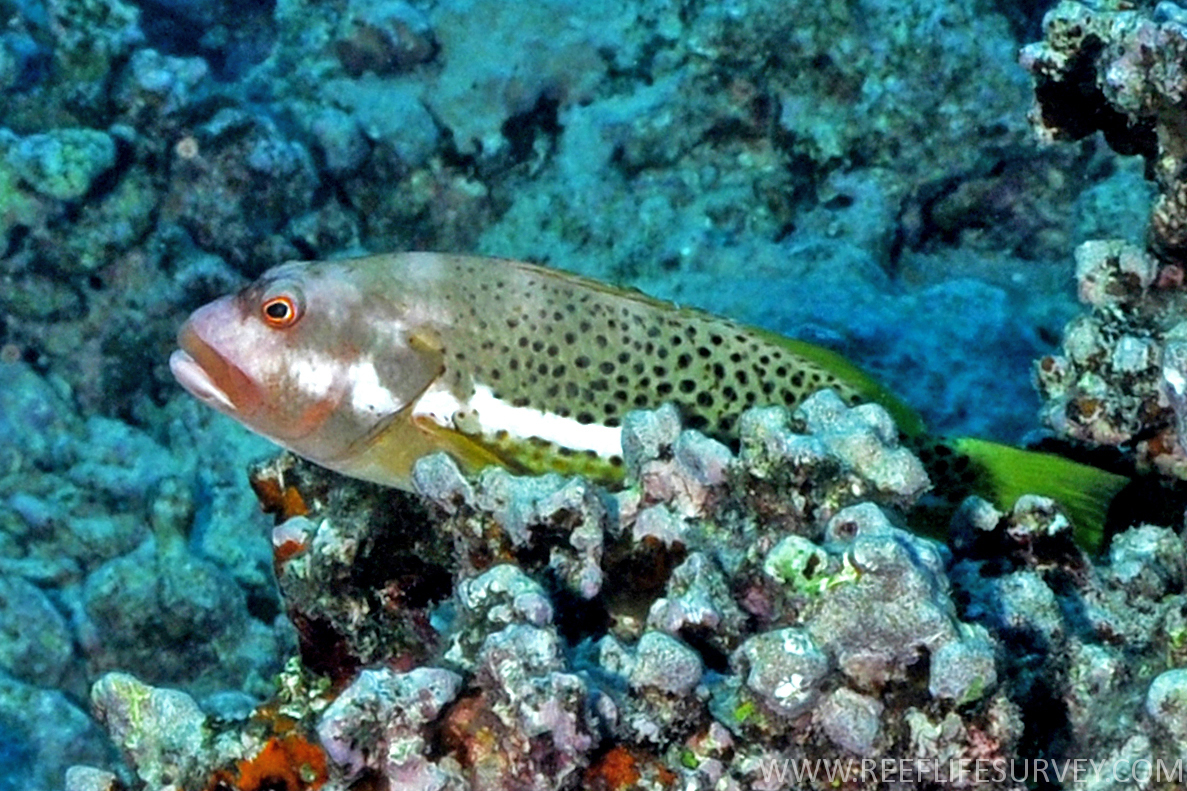
- Paracirrhites hemistictus from French Polynesia

Conservation status
- Least Concern (IUCN 3.1)

Scientific classification
- Kingdom: Animalia
- Phylum: Chordata
- Class: Actinopterygii
- Order: Centrarchiformes
- Family: Cirrhitidae
- Genus: Paracirrhites
- Species: P. hemistictus

Binomial name
- Paracirrhites hemistictus (Günther, 1874)

Synonyms
- Cirrhites hemistictus Günther, 1874; Cirrhites polystictus Günther, 1874; Paracirrhites polystictus (Günther, 1874)

= Whitespot hawkfish =

Species of fish

The whitespot hawkfish (Paracirrhites hemistictus), the halfspotted hawkfish, multicolored hand-fish and ornate hawkfish, is a species of marine ray-finned fish, a hawkfish belonging to the family Cirrhitidae. It is found in the Indo-Pacific region.

== Taxonomy ==
The whitespot hawkfish was first formally described in 1874 as Cirrhites hemistictus by the German born British ichthyologist Albert Günther with the type locality given as the Society Islands. The specific name hemistictus neams "half spotted" a reference to the small dark spots on the upper body. At the same time as Günther described this species he described Cirrhites polystictus which has its whole body spotted but this is a colour form of C. hemistictus making C. polystictus a synonym of C. hemistictus.

== Description ==
The whitespot hawkfish has a rather elongated body relative to its congeners, the standard length being 2.8 to 3.2 times the depth. It has a large mouth which extends to below the centre of the eye. The preopercle has fine serrations on its upper two fifths. The continuous dorsal fin has 10 spines and 11 soft rays, with each spine having a single cirrus on the tip and the membranes between the spines are notched. The anal fin has 3 spines and 6 soft rays. There are 14 pectoral fin rays, the lower 7 are robust and unbranched. The caudal fin is marginally rounded with sharp tips to the upper and lower lobes. This is the largest species in its genus attaining a maximum total length of 29 cm (11 in), although 20 cm (7.9 in) is more typical. There are two different colour forms, a pale form which has black spots on the upper half of its body, a pinkish face and a white stripe running along its flanks and a dark form which is grey with dark brown spots over all the body. There is a white or pinkish spot, roughly equal in size to the eye, on the flank.

== Distribution and habitat ==
The whitespot hawkfish has a wide Indo-Pacific distribution but it appears to prefer oceanic insular waters to waters close to continents or large islands. Its range extends from Christmas Island and the Cocos (Keeling) Islands in the eastern Indian Ocean east through the Pacific to the Kiribati Line Islands and the Pitcairn Islands, north to the Ogasawara Islands of southern Japan and south to the Great Barrier Reef, New Caledonia and Fiji. This species normally occurs at depths between 1 and 18 m (3 ft 3 in and 59 ft 1 in) although it has been recorded at greater depth in areas of Micronesia, including in the Line Islands. It is found on reef fronts and outer reef slopes which are exposed to waves and tidal currents.

== Biology ==
The whitespot hawkfish is an uncommon fish which can be found on tropical reefs at depths around 1 to 20 m (3.3 to 65.6 ft). They are solitary and usually perch on coral branches, gorgonians and rocks. They feed on small fishes and crustaceans. Male maintains a harem of a few females.

== Fisheries ==
The whitespot hawkfish is of limited importance commercially but it is fished for using hook and line.
