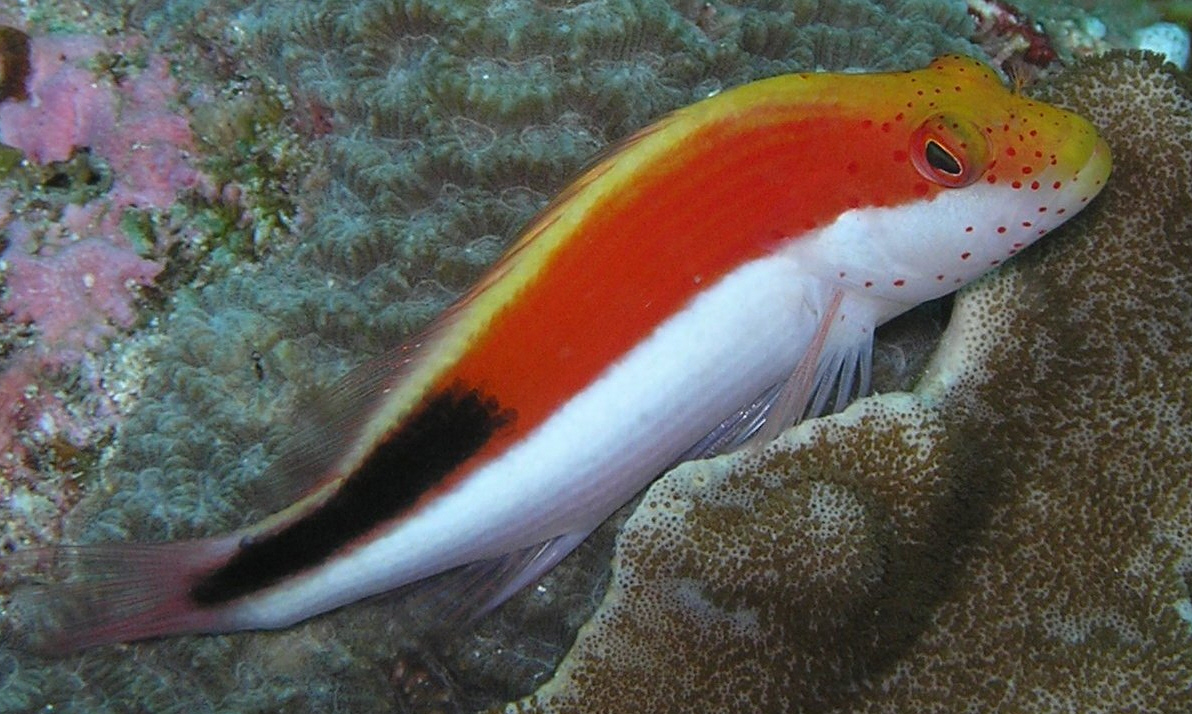
- Blackside hawkfish (P. forsteri)

Scientific classification
- Kingdom: Animalia
- Phylum: Chordata
- Class: Actinopterygii
- Division: Teleostei
- Order: Centrarchiformes
- Family: Cirrhitidae
- Genus: Paracirrhites; Bleeker, 1874

Type species
- Grammistes forsteri J. G. Schneider, 1801

Species
- 6; see text

Synonyms
- Gymnocirrhites J. L. B. Smith, 1951

= Paracirrhites =

Genus of fishes

Paracirrhites is a genus of marine ray-finned fish, hawkfishes belonging to the family Cirrhitidae. These fishes are found on tropical reefs of the Indian Ocean and Pacific Ocean.

== Taxonomy ==
Paracirrhites was described in 1874 by the Dutch ichthyologist Pieter Bleeker, Bleeker designated Grammistes forsteri, described by the German naturalist Johann Gottlob Schneider in 1801, as the type species for his new genus in 1876. This genus appears to be a sister taxon to the genera Amblycirrhitus and Cirrhitus within the Cirrhitidae. The genus name is a compound of para meaning "near" or "similar to" and Cirrhites, an alternative spelling of the type genus of the family Cirrhitidae, Cirrhitus.

There are three species of little known, small, largely sympatric and very similar Paracirrhites from Polynesia, P. bicolor, P. nisus and P. xanthus. These were all described by John E. Randall in 1963. It has been suggested that these are actually colour morphs of the same polymorphic species which has undergone some introgression of genes from the widespread and also sympatric arc-eye hawkfish.

== Species ==
The six currently recognized species in this genus are:

- Paracirrhites arcatus (G. Cuvier, 1829) (arc-eye hawkfish)
- Paracirrhites bicolor J. E. Randall, 1963
- Paracirrhites forsteri (J. G. Schneider, 1801) (blackside hawkfish)
- Paracirrhites hemistictus (Günther, 1874) (whitespot hawkfish)
- Paracirrhites nisus J. E. Randall, 1963
- Paracirrhites xanthus J. E. Randall, 1963

Some authorities treat Paracirrhites amblycephalus as a valid species but Fishbase treats this taxon as a synonym of P. arcatus.

== Characteristics ==
Parracirrhites hawkfishes are distinguished from other cirrhitid genera by having 5 scale rows between the lateral line and the base of the spiny part of the dorsal fin, each spine in the dorsal fin has a single cirrus at its tip and the membranes between the spines in the dorsal fin are not deeply notched. There are no teeth on the palatine. Other common features are the upper 1-2 and lower 6-7 pectoral fin rays are unbranched and robust, they have 11 soft dorsal fin rays and the preoperculum is either smooth or has very small serrations. The pectoral fins do not extend as far as the tips of the pelvic fins and the caudal fin varies from truncate to rounded. These fish vary in total length between 7.4 cm (2.9 in) in the case of Paracirrhites bicolor and 29 cm (11 in) for the whitespot hawkfish (P. hemistictus).

== Distribution and habitat ==
Paracirrhites hawkfishes have an Indo-Pacific distribution with a range which extends from East Africa east as far as Hawaii. They are associated with coral reefs and rocky substrates.

== Biology ==
Paracirrhites hawkfishes are predatory fish which prey on other fishes and crustaceans. They are sit and wait predators which rest on the substrate or perch on corals and other benthic invertebrates, adults lacking a swimbladder.

== Utilisation ==
Paracirrhites hawkfishes belonging to the smaller, commoner species P. arcutus and P. forsteri are collected for the aquarium trade. The larger species are sometimes fished for food but on a limited commercial basis.

== Bibliography ==
- Fritzsche, R.A., 1982. Osteichthyes. A: Parker, S.P., Synopsis and Classification of Living Organisms, vol. 2. McGraw-Hill, New York: 858–944.
