= Calypso Ichthyological Database =

Open source free repository

The Calypso Ichthyological Database numbering system is an open source free repository allowing the unique identification numbering of all fish species with a six-numeral fixed number. This number remains the same throughout any alterations or taxonomic changes to the species' accepted current scientific name and allows for recording of species data in 32 unique data fields including all previous names in 32 languages. It has been in use since 1994 and was pioneered by its inventor, Gerald H. Jennings, with the technical assistance of Terry Hall. It is accompanied by a vast photographic library of fish species and is free at the point of use to all researchers and academics. Much of the data is also available in published format and online.

== See also ==
- Ichthyology terms
