= Mabel Reid =

American Samoan politician

Member of the House of Representatives
- In office 1953–1954
- Succeeded by: Puiai Tufele
- Constituency: Maʻopūtasi County
- In office 1956–1960
- Preceded by: Puiai Tufele
- Constituency: Maʻopūtasi County

Personal details
- Born: 1909 Pago Pago
- Died: 9 November 1969 (aged 59–60)

Mabel Coleman Reid (died 9 November 1969), also known by the Samoan name Sinaitaaga, was an American Samoan politician. In 1953 she was one of the first two women elected to the Fono, when she and Zilpher Jennings won seats in the House of Representatives.

== Biography ==
Reid was one of ten children of American Navy sailor William Patrick Coleman and his Samoan wife Amata C. Kreuz. Her brother Peter later served as Governor of American Samoa. She was educated at the Sacred Hearts Academy in Hawaii, and became a stenographer and clerk of the High Court of American Samoa. She married businessman Lealaifuaneva Peter E. Reid, and had two children, Peter and Mabel. In 1947 she became an agent for the new Samoan Area Airways, set up by her brother Lawrence. She also became High Chief of Tali in Pago Pago.

In the 1953 legislative elections, Reid contested the Maʻopūtasi County seat in the House of Representatives, and was one of two women elected to the House alongside Zilpher Jennings. Although she lost her seat to Puiai Tufele in the 1954 elections, she defeated Tufele in the 1956 elections, the only woman to win a seat in the 1956 elections. During her second term she served as chair of the Ways and Means committee and as Acting Speaker of the House. She was re-elected in 1958, remaining in office until the end of the sixth legislature.

Reid died in November 1969.
