= Suʻa Alexander Eli Jennings =

American politician from Swains Island

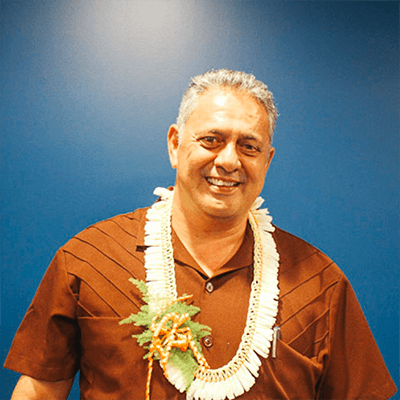

Delegate to the American Samoa House of Representatives from the Swains Island
- Incumbent
- Assumed office January 3, 2005
- Preceded by: Wallace Thompson

Personal details
- Spouse: Rowena Jennings
- Children: 4
- Occupation: Politician

Suʻa Alexander Eli Jennings is an American Samoan politician who is the current delegate to the American Samoa House of Representatives from Swains Island.

== Career ==
Suʻa Alexander Eli Jennings is a direct descendant of Eli Hutchinson Jennings, the first American settler of Swains Island. Jennings is a retired navy mechanic and a certified airline pilot and mechanic. He took office on January 3, 2005.

== Political career ==
In 2004, Jennings was chosen by U.S citizens and U.S. nationals residing on Swains Island to succeed Wallace Thompson as the non-voting delegate from the Swains Island to the American Samoa House of Representatives. Jennings is a supporter of the United States' position on Swains Island in the territorial dispute between the United States and Tokelau. Since 2013, he has been a voting member of the Sanctuary Advisory Council for the National Marine Sanctuary of American Samoa.

In 2020, he was elected to the position in the 2020 American Samoan general election against Penieli Baker and Bert Thompson. He serves as the chairman of the House Human Social Service Committee. He was re-elected in 2022.

In 2025, the Swains Island delegate became a voting member of the American Samoa House of Representatives.
