= Swains Island =

Atoll of American Samoa

Disputed island: Olohega; Jennings Island
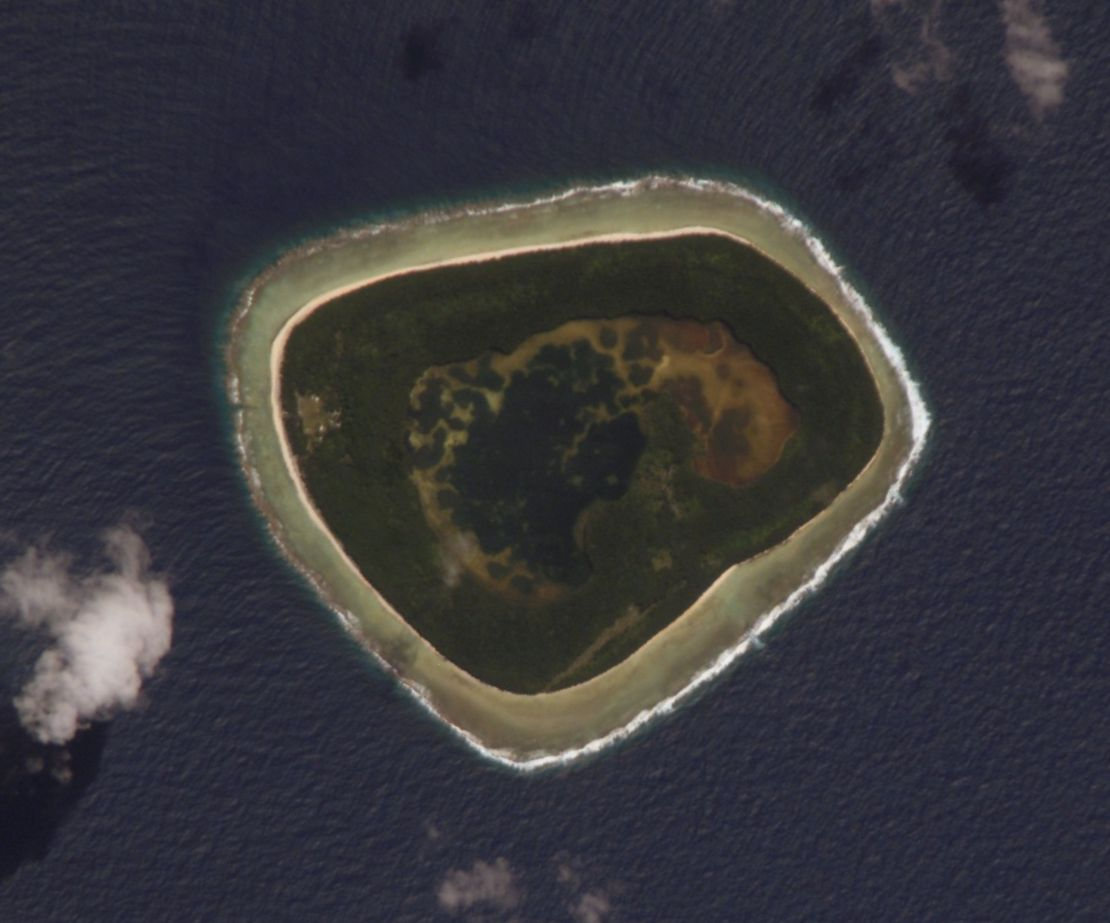
- Swains Island as seen from space

- Location within Oceania

Geography
- Location: Pacific Ocean
- Coordinates: 11°03′20″S 171°04′40″W
- Archipelago: Tokelau
- Area: 2.43 (Note: Land area. Area including lagoon is 3.5 km^{2} (1.4 sq mi).) km^{2} (0.94 sq mi)

Administration
- United States
- Territory: American Samoa

Claimed by
- Tokelau

Demographics
- Population: 0 (2020)

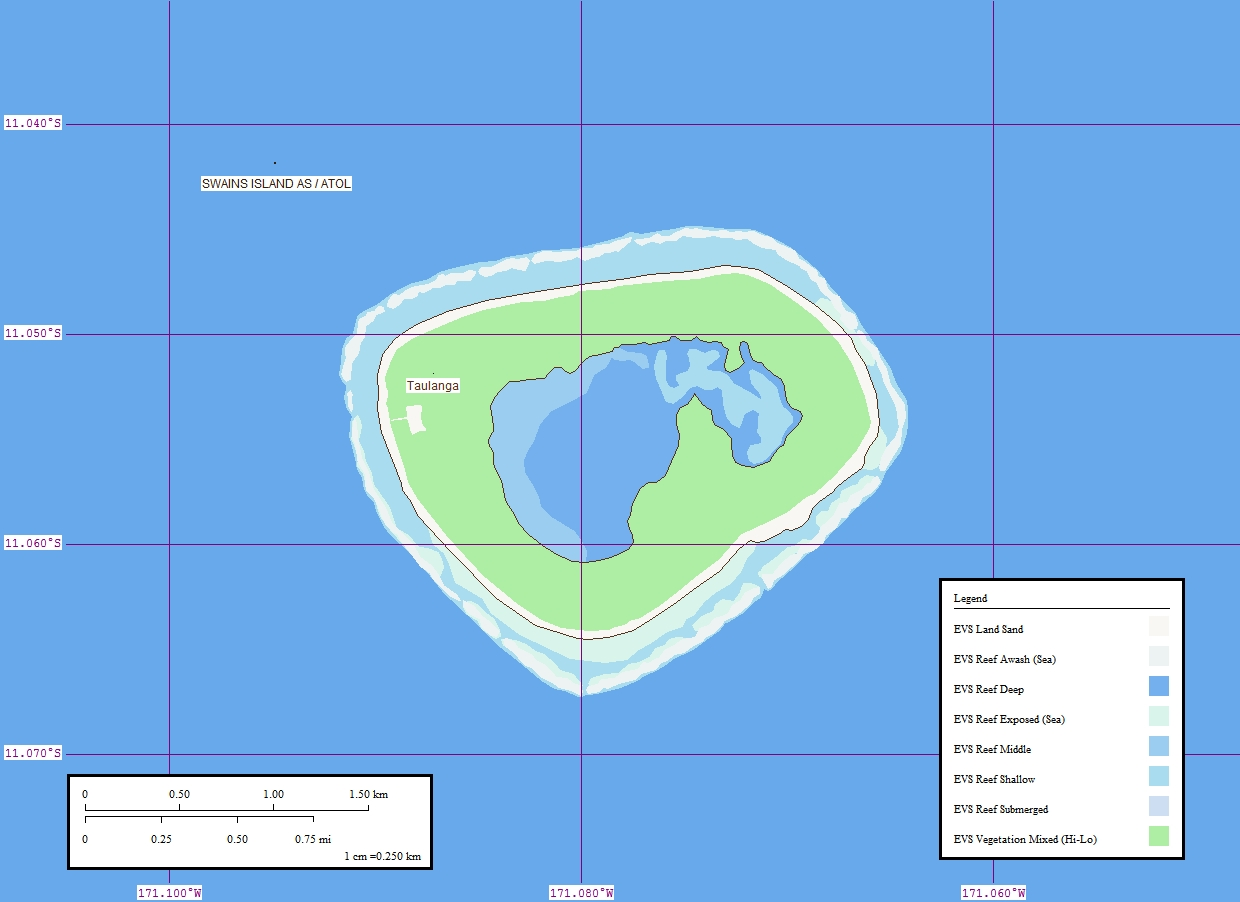
Map of the island

The flag of Swains Island was described as "Old Glory [...] but superimposed on the blue field was a white dove" At the 2023 celebration marking the 98th anniversary of Swains Island being joined with America Samoa, the Swains Island flag was raised alongside the U.S. and American Samoan flags in Taulaga Village.

Swains Island (/ˈsweɪnz/; Tokelauan: Olohega Tokelauan pronunciation: [oloˈhɛŋa]; Samoan: Olosega Samoan pronunciation: [oloˈsɛŋa]), also known as Jennings Island, is a remote coral atoll in the Tokelau volcanic island group in the South Pacific Ocean. Administered as part of American Samoa since 1925, the island is subject to an ongoing territorial dispute between Tokelau and the United States.

Privately owned by the family of Eli Hutchinson Jennings since 1856, Swains Island was used as a copra plantation until 1967. It has not been permanently inhabited since 2008, but continues to be visited by members of the Jennings family, scientific researchers, and amateur radio operators.

The island is located 180 km (97 nmi; 112 mi) south of Fakaofo (Tokelau) and 300 km (162 nmi; 186 mi) north of Savai‘i (Samoa). The land area is 2.43 km^{2} (0.94 sq mi), and the total area including the lagoon is 3.5 km^{2} (1.4 sq mi).

== Etymology ==
Swains Island has been known by several names: Gente Hermosa, Quiros Island, Olosega, Olohega, and Jennings Island.

Swains Island was long believed to have been first charted on 2 March 1606 by Pedro Fernandes de Queirós, a Portuguese navigator who sailed for Spain. On that date, he reckoned an island at 10°36′S 171°W, and his ship's historian named it Isla de la Gente Hermosa (Spanish for 'island of the beautiful people'), after its inhabitants. The closest island to that reckoned location is Swains Island at 11°03′S 171°05′W, leading later authors to label it with the Spanish name or the Spanish version of Queirós's surname, Quirós. However, the island described by Queirós was significantly larger and, considering likely errors in the calculation of longitude, later scholars concluded that the island found by Queirós was actually Rakahanga, lying 1,100 km (590 nmi; 680 mi) to the east.

Captain William L. Hudson of the USS Peacock sighted Swains Island on 1 February 1841, during the United States Exploring Expedition of 1838–42. He claimed to have learned about the island's location from a Captain Swain of Nantucket, and after concluding that it did not match the description by Queirós, resolved to call it Swain's Island (the apostrophe was later dropped):

[F]rom having its position very nearly pointed out to me by Capt. Swain of Nantucket who stated to me at Tahiti that he had seen it in passing—and in consequence of its being a considerable distance in latitude from, and not agreeing in size or character with the island described by Queros—in addition to this in view of it being peopled with a beautiful race—it is uninhabited and perhaps we are the first that have ever set foot upon it—thus much for its name.

This Captain Swain has not been conclusively identified. Authors have suggested it might be Jonathan Swain of whaler Independence in 1820, or William C. Swain of whaler George Champlain (Note: Sources refer to this ship by various spellings: Chamblain, Chamblan, Champlain, Champlin, Chaplin.) in the 1830s. Other evidence suggests Obed Swain of whaler Jefferson of Nantucket, who was at Tahiti when the United States Exploring Expedition was there with the USS Peacock.

It is also called Jennings Island, after Eli Hutchinson Jennings, who settled there in 1856 and whose family still owns and manages the island.

In Tokelauan, the main language formerly spoken on Swains Island, the island is called Olohega [oloˈhɛŋa]. The name is composed of the prefix olo-, indicating a collective noun, and the word hega, meaning a tuft of feathers tied to the end of a skipjack lure, possibly referring to the island's location at the end of the Tokelau chain. A variant of this name is Olosega [oloˈsɛŋa] in both Tokelauan and Samoan. It should not be confused with the homonymous island in the pair Ofu-Olosega of the Manu‘a group in American Samoa.

== Geography ==
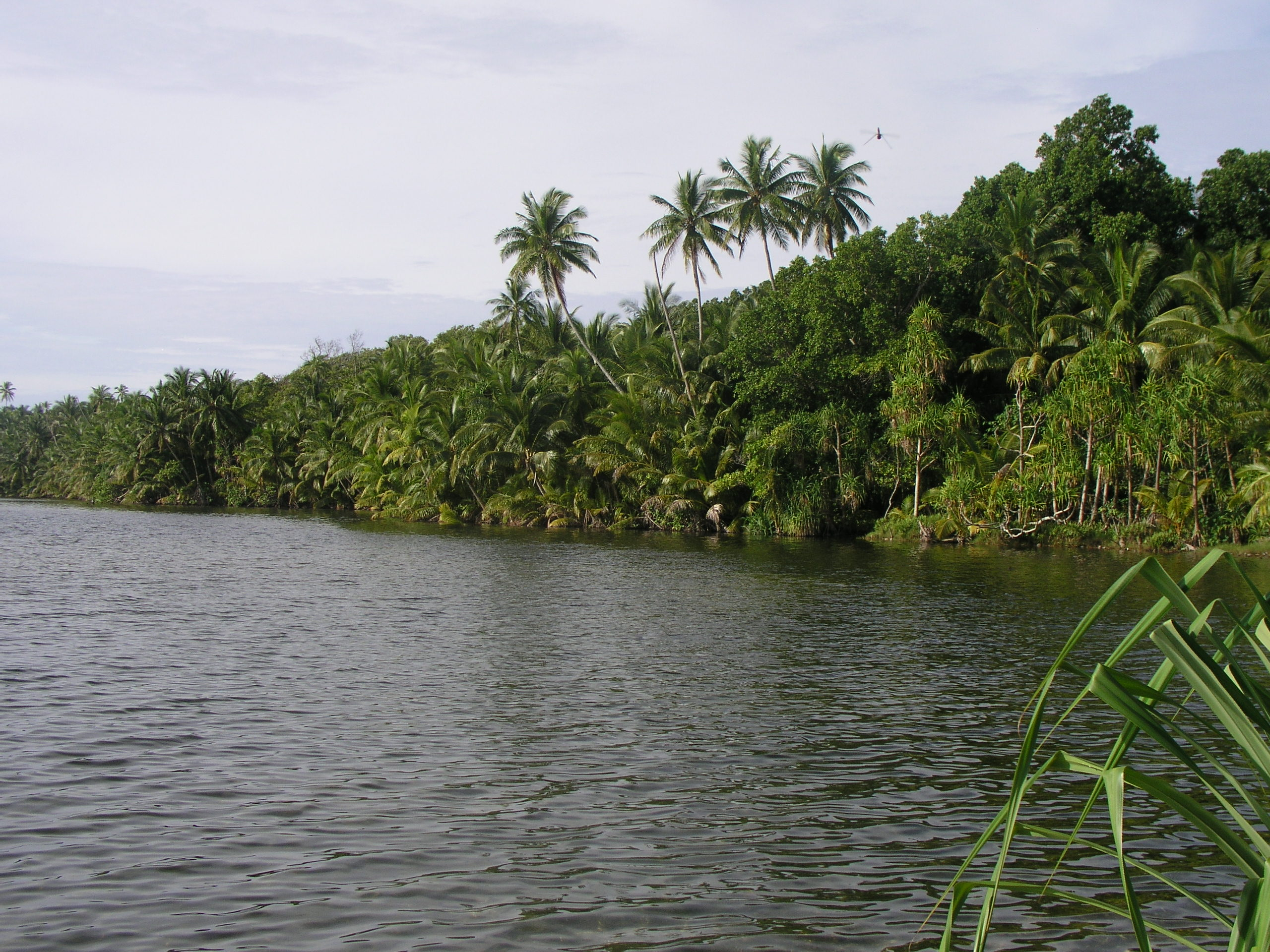
Swains Island lagoon

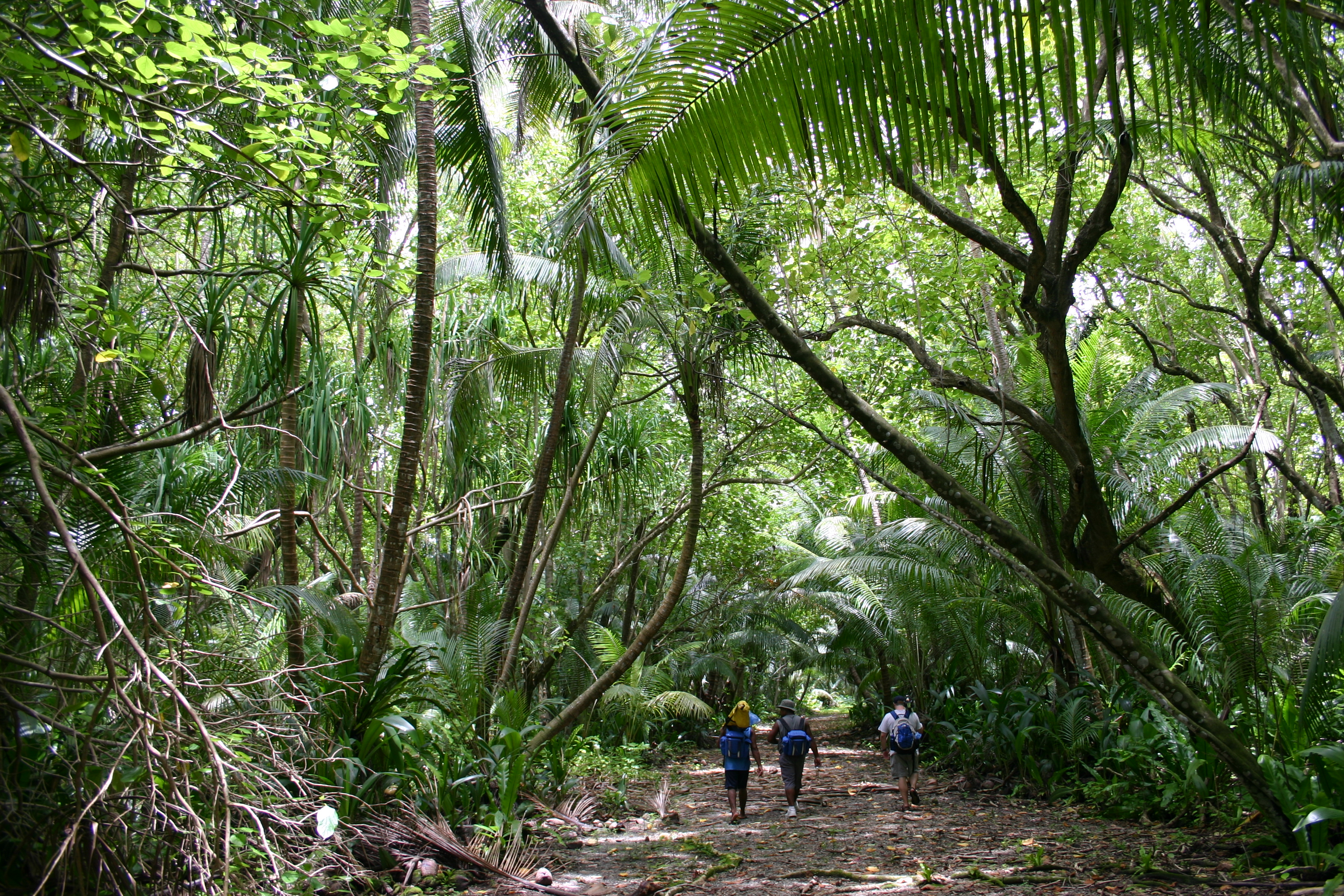
Road on Swains Island

Swains Island has a total area of about 3.5 km^{2} (1.4 sq mi), of which 2.43 km^{2} (0.94 sq mi) is land. The central lagoon, called Lake Namo, accounts for 1.16 km^{2} (0.45 sq mi).

The atoll is somewhat unusual, featuring an unbroken circle of land enclosing a lagoon separated from the sea. The channel connecting the lagoon to the sea likely closed around 575 CE. The lagoon has a maximum depth of 12 m (39 ft) and contains significant amounts of algae and two species of freshwater fish. Its water has a salinity of about 0.4%, described as brackish, useful for bathing and washing but not for drinking. Drinking water in the island is derived entirely from rainfall collected in tanks. A 1998 investigation of the lagoon noted possible evidence that the lagoon is fed by volcanic springs; fresh water plumes were also noted in the island's fringing reef. Nearly all of the land is filled with coconut palms.

The village of Taulaga (meaning 'harbor' or town) in the west of the island consists of a malae (open ceremonial space) surrounded by houses, a church, a communications center, and a school, but as of 2013 the only structure still standing was a church built around 1886.

The village of Etena (meaning 'Eden') in the south contains the former residence of the Jennings family, also built in the 1880s but abandoned after a cyclone severely damaged it in 2005. A four-bedroom, colonial-style residence is now in a state of disrepair and largely overgrown. A road named Belt Road once circled the entire island, but as of 2013 only the portion connecting the two villages was usable, the rest being covered in vegetation. The island also contains several cemeteries.

Swains Island is part of the National Marine Sanctuary of American Samoa. The Swains Island sanctuary area encompasses a 52.3 square miles (135 km^{2}) and includes territorial waters within a 3 nautical miles (5.6 km) circle around the island, excluding the interior lagoon and two channels between the lagoon and the sea. Like other areas of its coastline, the United States claims a 200-nautical-mile (230 mi; 370 km) exclusive economic zone around Swains Island, making up about a third of the U.S. EEZ in the South Pacific.

== Fauna ==
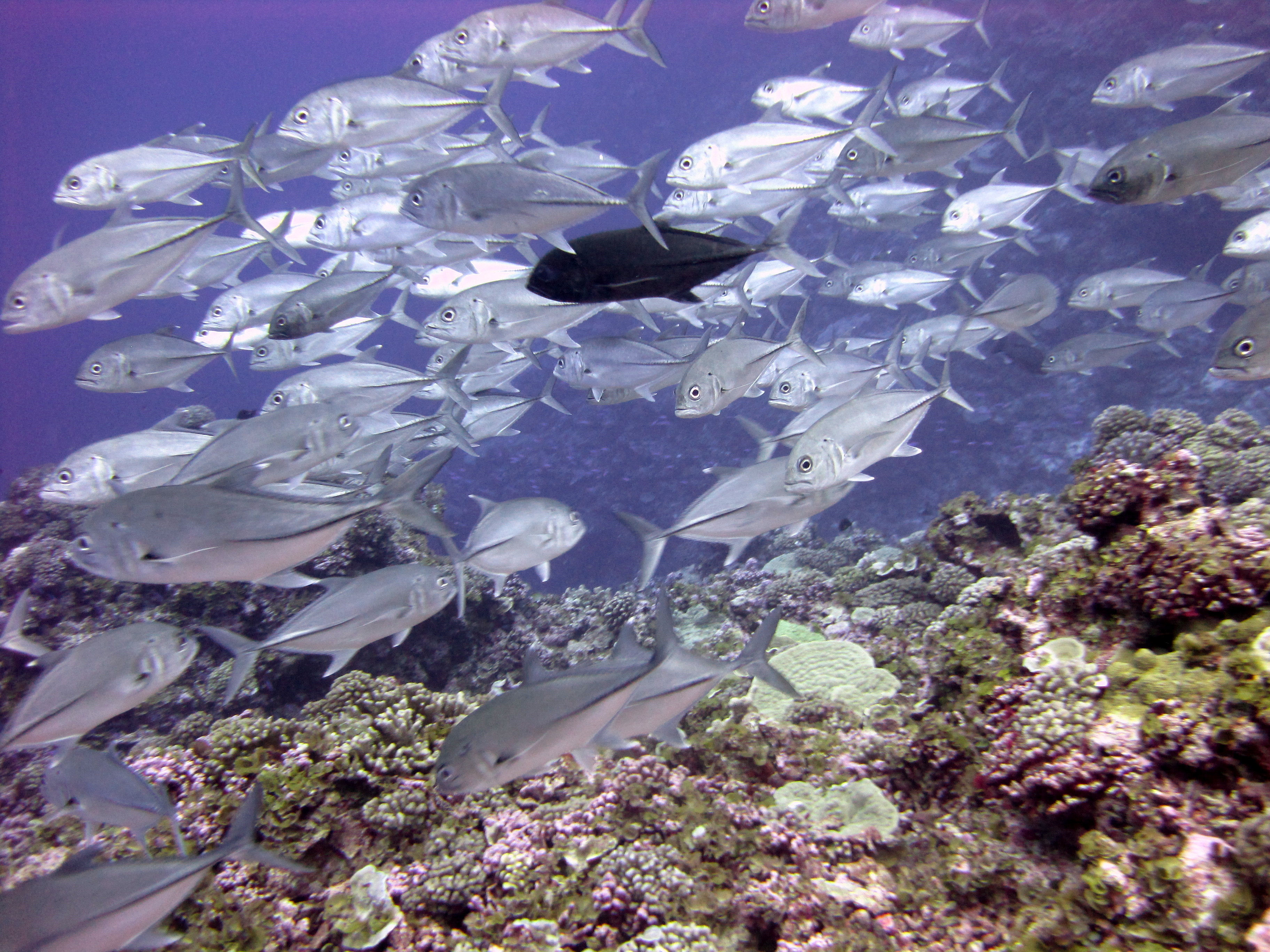
Bigeye trevally (Caranx sexfasciatus) on the reef around Swains Island in 2012.

The island has been recognised as an Important Bird Area (IBA) by BirdLife International because it supports a breeding population of white terns. Seven reptile species have been recorded from the island, including three geckos and three skinks, as well as the green sea turtles which formerly nested on the island, but now occur only as visitors to inshore waters. A 2012 survey noted the island's seabird community was dominated by black noddies, white terns, and brown noddies, while the reef flat was dominated by Pacific golden plovers and wandering tattlers. Inland surveys found roosting or breeding communities of noddys, terns, and red-footed boobies. The island is also home to coconut crabs, as well as several non-native invasive species, including Pacific rats and feral cats. Feral pigs were eradicated from the island in the early 2010s. In 2022, the American Samoa Department of Marine and Wildlife Resources received a grant to help eradicate non-native predators from Swains Island.

In the lagoon, two freshwater fish were reported as common in 2013: a goby and a molly; however, the specific species were unidentified. A goby collected at Swains Island in 1939 was identified as a new subspecies, Bathygobius fuscus swainsensis. Studies of the waters surrounding Swains Island have noted deep-sea coral, sponges, sea stars, crinoids, and crustaceans, including giant glass sponges (Amphidiscosida). Predator species, such as barracudas, jacks, and snappers, are also found near Swains Island, and sharks and humphead wrasse are frequently seen in its nearshore waters. Dogtooth tuna is more common near Swains than other waters of American Samoa.

== Demographics ==
Historical population
Year	Pop.	±%
1930	99	—
1940	147	+48.5%
1950	164	+11.6%
1960	106	−35.4%
1970	74	−30.2%
1980	27	−63.5%
1990	16	−40.7%
2000	37	+131.2%
2010	17	−54.1%
2020	0	−100.0%
U.S. Decennial Census

Swains Island first appeared in the U.S. census in 1930, following its annexation to American Samoa in 1925.

The 2010 census counted 17 people in six households on Swains Island. There were eight males (ages 20 to 61) and nine females (three under age 18, six ages 18 to 61). There were 11 U.S. nationals (eight born in American Samoa, and three in the United States) and six foreign nationals (four born in Samoa, one in Tokelau, and one in the Philippines). They reported their ethnic origins as 15 Samoans, one Tokelauan, and one Filipino. Of the 16 people over age five, 15 spoke mainly Samoan, and one spoke another Oceanic language, but all also spoke English.

However, the people counted in the 2010 census likely did not permanently reside on Swains Island. Multiple visitors have reported the island as uninhabited since 2008. The 2020 census recorded no residents there.

== History ==
Archaeological field research on Swains Island has been largely limited to only a few surveys, in part due to the private ownership of the island since it was first claimed by the Jennings family. However, based upon oral traditions and limited field work, anthropologists estimate that the island was settled by Polynesian voyagers in the mid-1300s CE, although it may have served as a waypoint for travel between islands prior to that. Evidence of pre-contact settlement include mounds and a tupua (sacred stone). Oral histories indicate the island was later dominated by the Tokelauan atoll Fakaofo, but there are also memories of the island being depopulated by famine prior to western contact. Connections between the island and Samoa were also known.

Whalers from New England began visiting the island as early as 1820 to load fresh water from the atoll's lagoon. Settlers from Tokelau also reestablished a presence on the island by the 1800s, and the colony was well established by the time a group of Frenchmen arrived in the 1840s with the aim of establishing a copra production operation. Many Tokelauans abandoned the island at that point due to violence from the Westerners.

Captain William L. Hudson of the USS Peacock sighted the island on 1 February 1841, during the United States Exploring Expedition of 1838–42. He named it Swain's Island after "a certain Captain Swain", from whom he had learned about the island's location.

=== The Jennings family ===
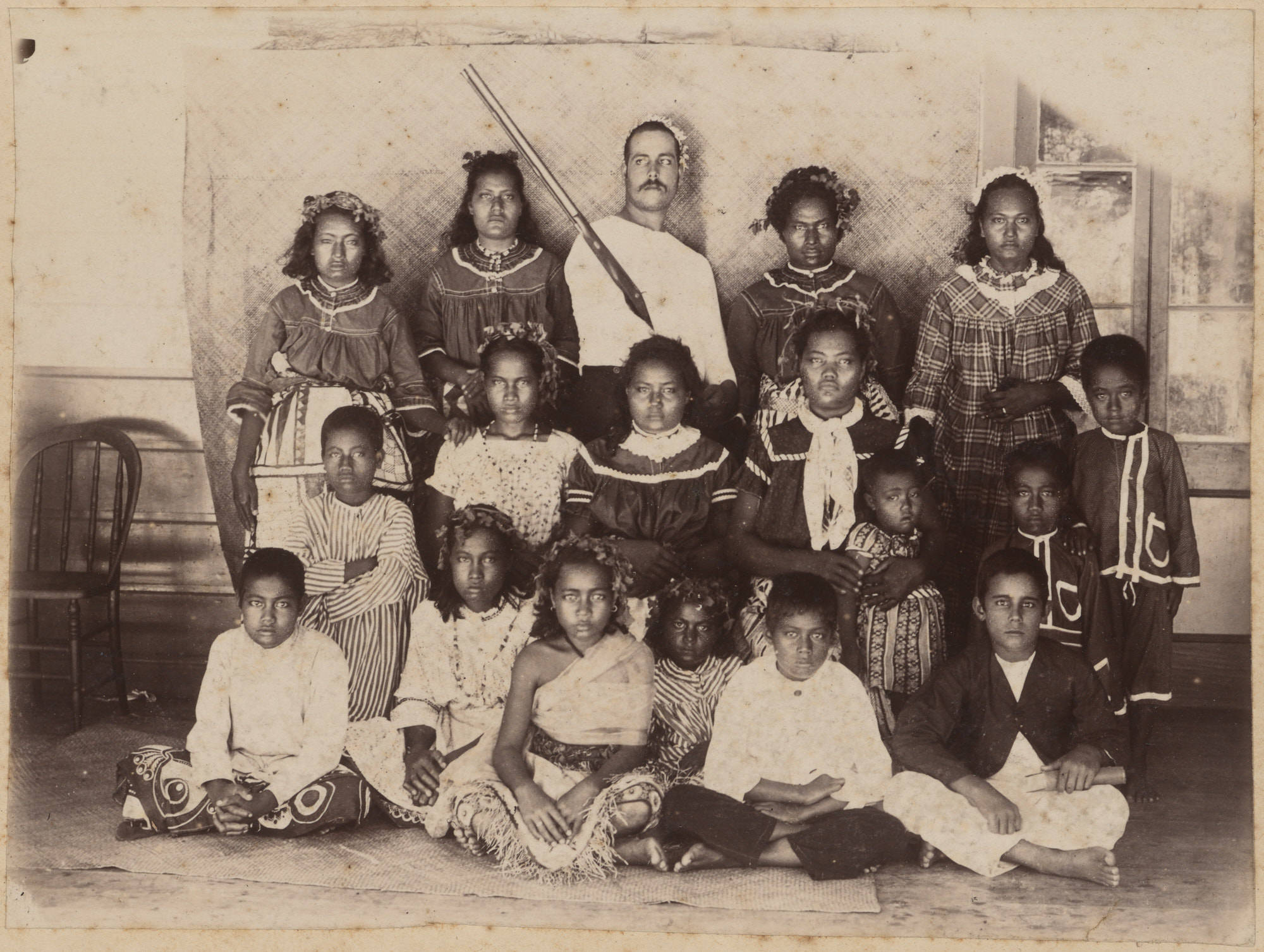
Group of young people and children from Swains Island, late 1886. Photographed by Thomas Andrew.

Throughout the 1840s and 1850s, Swains Island was visited by whalers seeking fresh water. By the mid-1850s, a group of Fakaofoans had returned to the island, and the French copra workers had left.

In 1856, an American, Eli Hutchinson Jennings (14 November 1814 – 4 December 1878), arrived on Swains with his Samoan wife, Malia, who was from Upolu. Originally from Long Island in New York, Jennings came to the Pacific as a whaler, eventually settling in Samoa, where he became involved in local struggles over lineage after the death of Tamafaiga. While in Samoa, Jennings purchased the title for Swains Island from a British Captain Turnbull, who claimed ownership of the island by right of discovery. According to one account, the sale price for Swains was 15 shillings per acre (37 shillings per hectare) — and a bottle of gin. (The per-acre price is equivalent to £70 in 2025.)

Jennings arrived on Swains on 13 October 1856 and began work to establish a copra plantation. One of the Frenchmen later returned, but did not care to share the island with Jennings and left. Swains was considered a semi-independent proprietary settlement of the Jennings family (although under the U.S. flag), a status it would retain for approximately 70 years. It was also claimed for the U.S. by the United States Guano Company in 1860, under the Guano Islands Act. However, there is no evidence that guano or guano mining was present on the island.

Jennings also played an instrumental role in helping Peruvian "blackbird" slave ships depopulate the other three Tokelau atolls.

After Jennings died in 1878, his wife Malia took over management of the island's coconut plantation until her death in 1891. At that point, their son Eli Jennings Jr inherited the island and its copra industry. Jennings had been born on Swains Island, but he was educated in San Francisco, and was referred to as "King Jennings". Jennings's descendants maintain ownership of the island to the current era.

=== American sovereignty ===
In September 1909, John Quayle-Dickson, the resident commissioner of the British protectorate of Gilbert and Ellice Islands, (Note: Since 1979 the sovereign nations of Kiribati and Tuvalu) claimed that Swains belonged to the United Kingdom and demanded a tax payment of US$85 on profits from the island's copra production. The demand came despite the HMS Egeria noting during its 1889 cruise through the Union and Phoenix Islands that the American flag was flying over Swains. Jennings paid, but brought the matter before the U.S. State Department and his money was ultimately refunded in 1911 when the British government conceded that Swains was an American possession. In the subsequent years, the United Kingdom again questioned the U.S. State Department about the status of Swains Island and, in 1913, the governor of American Samoa recommended that the island be officially annexed. While the Departments of State and War did not object, it was unclear how such an annexation should occur.

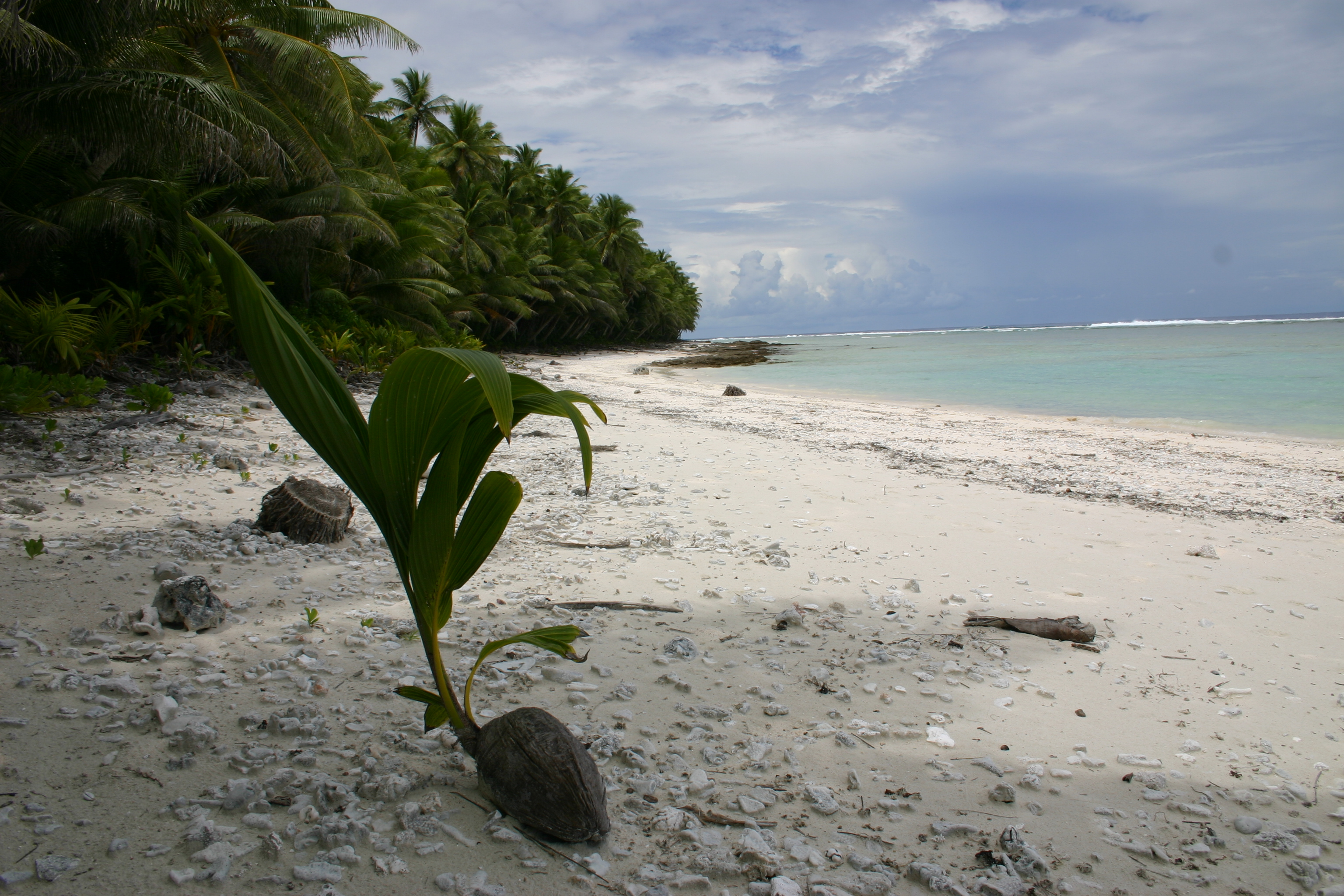
Swains Island Beach

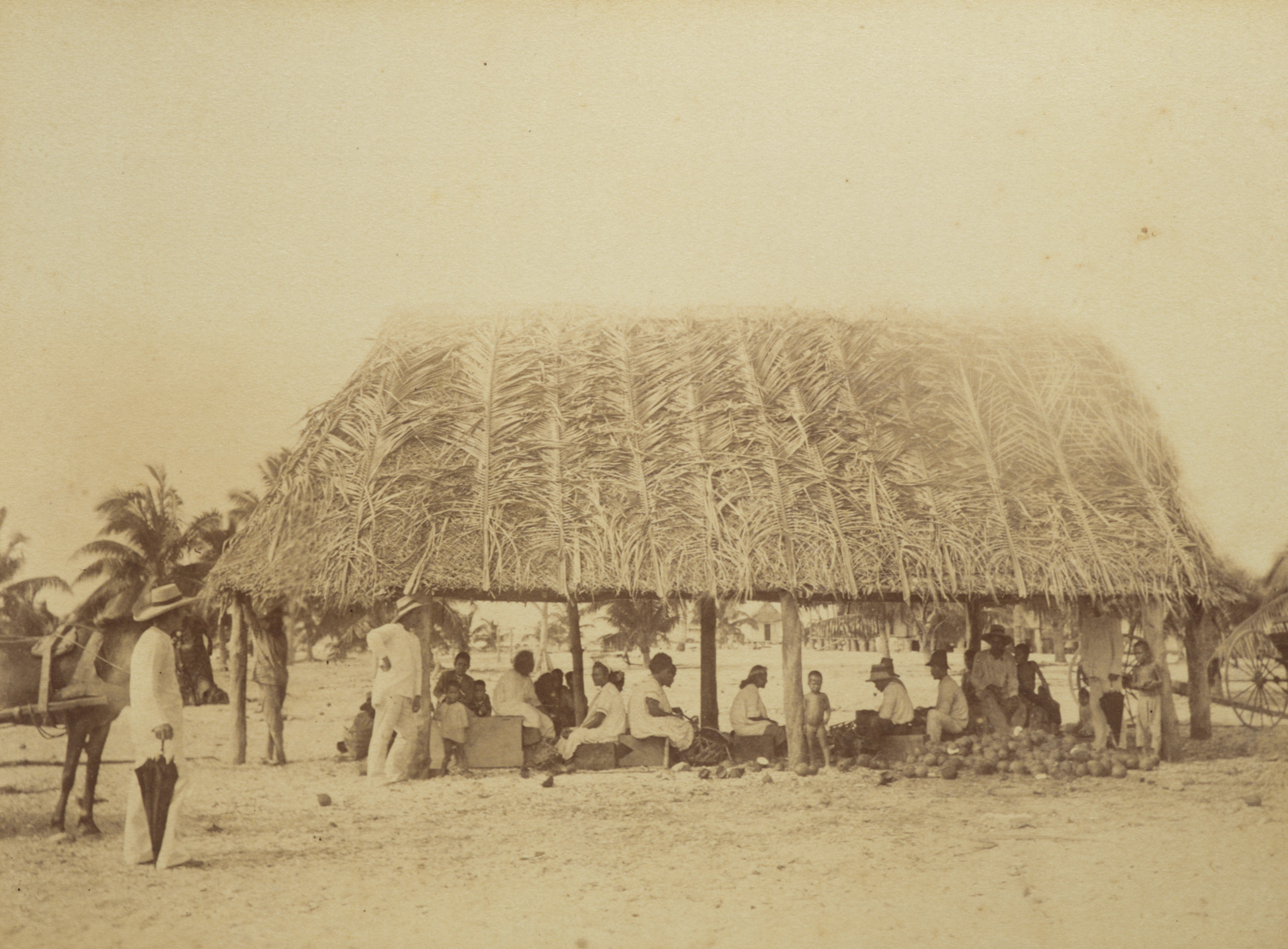
Copra processing on Swains Island in 1886

The ownership of the island came into question after Eli Jr.'s death in 1920 and that of his wife in 1921. The United States decided to give the right of administration jointly to Eli's daughter Ann and son Alexander. The island was officially joined administratively with the territory of American Samoa via annexation on 4 March 1925. On 13 May 1925, U.S. Navy Lieutenant Commander Campbell Dallas Edgar arrived on the USS Ontario to raise the U.S. flag formally over Swains Island. At that time, about 100 people lived on the island and Alexander Jennings was its managing owner. With the island's status settled, the U.S. Navy established a radio station on the island in 1938. During World War II, the island had a population of 125, and supported a naval weather tracking and plane-spotting station.

Copra—dried coconut meat used to produce coconut oils for food, soap, lubricants, and other products—was the sole commercial product of Swains Island. Copra production on the island involved workers husking mature coconuts in the field. The husks were left in the groves to improve the soil and the husked nuts were carried by jeep or tractor-drawn wagons to centralized drying sheds, where the nuts were cracked and the coconut meat spread out to dry in the sun. The resulting copra was taken by long boat across the reef to waiting vessels that took the copra to market. Most of the plantation workers were Tokelauan. While some ties were maintained with Fakaofo, the immigration of workers from the Samoas, Tuvalu, Kiribati, and other islands led to a divergence of language and culture between Swains Island and the islands of Tokelau.

In 1953, labor troubles arose on Swains when Tokelauan-hired workers decided to claim "squatters' rights" to the atoll by virtue of having lived on it year-round. The Jennings family maintained a legal obligation to remove workers from the island for at least one day each year. Jennings also accused the workers of engaging in slowdowns, reducing the island's copra production. In response, Alexander Jennings evicted 56 workers and their families from the island, leading the governor of American Samoa to intervene. Territorial officials visited the island in late 1953 and, on January 21, 1954, Gov. Richard Barrett Lowe issued an executive order acknowledging Jennings's property rights to Swains Island, while instituting a system of labor contracts and a local governmental structure to protect the rights of his employees. The executive order also specified that workers should be Samoan or part-Samoan.

In 1960, the American Samoan constitution guaranteed the islanders a non-voting delegate to the Fono. In 2025, a constitutional amendment granted the delegate the right to vote in the Fono's lower house.

In 1966, Swains Island was heavily affected by a late January cyclone. Several buildings were blown away and a United States Air Force plane air-dropped 15 parachute-loads of food to the 136 people on the island. Nearly two years later, in December 1967, another storm hit the island, destroying crops and damaging buildings.

The island was producing about 200 short tons (180 t) of copra per year at the time of its labor struggles in the mid-1950s, although its owners estimated about 350 short tons (320 t) could be produced. Difficulties transporting processed copra from the island, however, limited the plantation's growth and the island's population decreased from a high of 300 to 62 in 1971. Commercial copra production on the island ended in 1967, but some 800 acres (320 hectares) of coconut groves continue to grow on the island.

In 2017, Swains Island Representative Su’a Alexander Eli Jennings proposed growing breadfruit to revive the island's agricultural activities. The breadfruit, along with native fa’i paka bananas, would be processed using solar dehydrators into gluten-free flour.

=== Recent sovereignty and trade issues ===
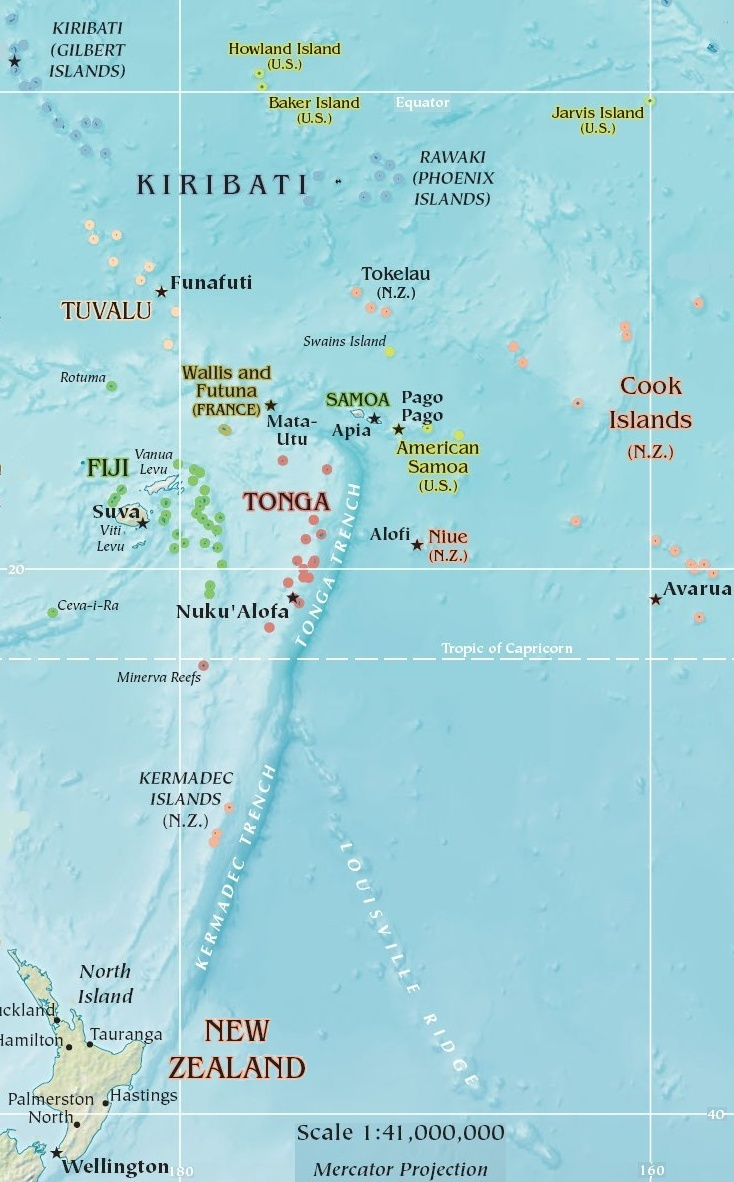
Swains Island lies between the Samoan islands and Tokelau (upper center)

On 25 March 1981, New Zealand, of which Tokelau is a dependency, confirmed U.S. sovereignty over Swains Island in the Treaty of Tokehega, under which the United States surrendered territorial claims to the other islands of Tokelau. In the draft constitution that was the subject of the 2006 Tokelau self-determination referendum, however, Swains Island was claimed as part of Tokelau. As of March 2007, American Samoa had not yet taken an official position, but the governor of American Samoa, Togiola Tulafono, said that he believed his government should do everything it can to retain control of the island. Tokelau's claim to Swains is generally comparable to the Marshall Islands' claim to Wake Island (also administered by the U.S.). The re-emergence of this issue in the mid-2000s was an unintended consequence of the United Nations' efforts to promote decolonization in Tokelau in the early 2000s.

In 2007, Tokelau's regional parliament, the General Fono, considered the adoption of a new flag for their nation with four stars arranged in the general shape of Tokelau's three islands along with Swains Island at a proportional distance to that of the others. Ultimately a compromise was adopted whereby the four stars were retained, but arranged to represent the Southern Cross.

During a 2007 visit to Tokelau, Suʻa Alexander Jennings, Swains Island representative to the American Samoa legislature, indicated a desire for better trade links between Swains and its neighbor, saying that he believed the then-head of government of Tokelau, Kuresa Nasau, was also interested in improved relations.

=== Cyclone Percy 2005 ===
In February 2005, Cyclone Percy struck the island, causing widespread damage and virtually destroying the village of Taulaga, as well as the old Jennings estate at Etena. Only seven people were on the island at the time. United States Coast Guard airdrops ensured that the islanders were not left without food, water and other necessities. A U.S. Coast Guard visit in March 2007 listed 12 to 15 inhabitants and showed that the island's trees had largely survived the cyclone.

=== Amateur radio ===
Due to its remoteness, Swains Island is considered a separate amateur radio "entity" and several visits have been made by ham operators. The DXCC Country code is 515, ITU Zone 62, and CQ Zone 32.

Swains Island was first "discovered" as a possible amateur radio "entity" for American Radio Relay League (ARRL) Award purposes by Kan Mizoguchi (JA1BK) in 2005. He led a ham radio DXpedition there in 2005; however, the ARRL did not accept it for credit. Eventually the ARRL decided to approve Swains Island as a new "entity" based on the separation distance between it and American Samoa. Once accepted, Mizoguchi led DXpedition KH8SI to the island, which qualified as the first valid operation on Swains. 16,390 contacts were made.

The 2007 DXpedition N8S made more than 117,000 contacts worldwide. This set a new world record for an expedition using generator power and tents for living accommodations; the record was broken by the 2012 DXpedition to Malpelo Island. In 2012, Swains Island hosted the DXpedition NH8S from September 5–19. A total of 105,391 radio contacts were made. In 2023, DXpedition W8S was hosted on the island from October 4–17 with 10 international operators. A reported 90,000 connections were made during the DXpedition.

== Island government ==
Since the resolution of the labor dispute in 1956, Swains Island has been governed by an American Samoa government representative, a village council, a pulenu'u (civic head of the village), and a leoleo (policeman). Swains Island officials have the same rights, duties, and qualifications as in other villages in American Samoa. Neither the proprietor of Swains Island, nor any employee of his, may serve as government representative.

The government representative has the following duties:

- to act as the governor's representative on Swains Island
- to mediate between employees and their employer
- to enforce those laws of the United States and of American Samoa which apply on Swains Island
- to enforce village regulations
- to keep the governor apprised of the state of affairs on Swains Island, particularly on the islanders' health, education, safety, and welfare
- to ensure that Swains Islanders continue to enjoy the rights, privileges, and immunities accorded to them by the laws of the United States and of American Samoa
- to ensure that the proprietary rights of the owner are respected

The government representative has the following rights, powers, and obligations:

- to make arrests
- to quell breaches of the peace
- to call meetings of the village council to consider special subjects
- to take such actions as may be reasonably necessary to implement and render effective his duties

Swains Island's village council consists of all men of sound mind over the age of 24. According to the federal census in 1980, five men fell into this category.

Every two years, Swains Islanders send one delegate to the lower house of the American Samoan territorial legislature. Since 2004, this office has been held by Suʻa Alexander Eli Jennings. Although the island is now uninhabited, it still retains the delegate, who is now selected by former inhabitants and their descendents. Traditionally, the Swains Island delegate did not have a vote in the Fono; however, this changed in 2025 with a constitutional amendment granting the delegate a vote.

=== The Jennings dynasty ===
Styling themselves "leaders" or "proprietors", members of the Jennings family ruled Swains Island virtually independent of any outside authority from 1856 to 1925. After 1925 and the acknowledged annexation of the island by the United States, while retaining proprietary ownership of the island, the Jennings family and others on the island became subject to the asserted jurisdiction of the governors of the U.S. territory of American Samoa and through them to portions of US law.

Jenningses who ruled as semi-independent "proprietors":

- 13 October 1856 – 4 December 1878: Eli Hutchinson Jennings Sr. (1814–1878)
- 4 December 1878 – 25 October 1891: Malia Jennings, his Samoan widow (d. 1891)
- 25 October 1891 – 24 October 1920: Eli Hutchinson Jennings Jr. (1863–1920) son of Eli and Malia (referred to by Robert Louis Stevenson as "King Jennings" during a visit to the island.)
- 24 October 1920 – August 1921: Ann Eliza Jennings Carruthers (1897–1921), jointly with sibling Alexander Hutchinson Jennings III; both children of Eli Jr.
- 24 October 1920 – 4 March 1925: Alexander Hutchinson Jennings III (jointly from 24 October 1920 and solely from August 1921)

Jenningses who ruled under direct American jurisdiction:

- 4 March 1925 – Unknown date in 1940s: Alexander Hutchinson Jennings III
- Unknown Dates between 1940 and 1954: Alexander E. Jennings
- 1954 to present: a form of local government under the frameworks established by American Samoa. However, the island is still acknowledged to be owned by the Jennings family.

Since the formation of the Fono in 1948, a member of the Jennings family has served as the island's member of the House of Representatives. Alexander E. Jennings served in the first Fono, followed by Zilpher Jennings in the third Fono. Between the 10th and 22nd Fonos, Wallace Jennings served seven terms and Jack Thompson served four. For the 23rd and 24th Fonos, Swains Island was represented by Eliza Jennings Thompson for two terms, followed by Wallace Thompson and, since the 29th Fono, Suʻa Alexander Eli Jennings.

== In popular culture ==
Swains Island: One of the Last Jewels of the Planet (2014), directed and narrated by Jean-Michel Cousteau, was the first American Samoan film to be entered in the Blue Ocean Festival in Florida in 2014. The film won first place in the category "Cultural Connections, People and the Sea".

The New Zealand-based band Te Vaka has written a song called "Haloa Olohega" ('Poor Olohega' in Tokelauan), lamenting the loss of the island for Tokelau.
