= La Vinia Delois Jennings =

American historian

La Vinia Delois Jennings is an American literary scholar and critic of twentieth-century American literature and culture, currently a Distinguished Humanities Professor at the University of Tennessee, and also formerly a Lindsay Young Professor and a 1998 Fulbright Senior Lecturer appointed to the University of Málaga in Spain.

== Ancestry ==
The daughter and seventh child of Robert Sydnor Jennings—a World War II army veteran who earned a bachelor of science degree in agriculture at West Virginia State College, and completed partial work toward a master's degree at Michigan State College, Lansing, before becoming an extension agent—La Vinia Delois Jennings grew up on Meadowlark, the family farm in Halifax County, Virginia. Her mother, Ara Belle Brown Jennings, a Florida native, enlisted in the Women's Army Corps (WAC) in May 1944, less than one year after Congress and President Franklin Delano Roosevelt passed the bill into law on July 1, 1943, creating the WAC and discontinuing the Women's Army Auxiliary Corps (WAAC). Jennings's great grandfather, Sydnor Johnston Jennings, was born at the conclusion of the Civil War and "worked as a sharecropper before coming into his own as a successful businessman who owned three farms." Before his death in 1940, he donated the land for Green Valley School, "one of the nearly 5,000 Rosenwald schools, partially built with money contributed by Julius Rosenwald, the president of Sears, Roebuck, and Company, [to construct] schools for African Americans across the South in the early twentieth century." In honor of her great grandfather, Jennings's family elders gave Halifax County the land to build Sydnor Jennings Elementary School, a larger, modern school across from the site of Green Valley School. It opened in the fall of 1962, prior to integration, and celebrated its fiftieth anniversary in 2012. Education was extremely important to her father and great grandfather and many members of Jennings's immediate and extended family earned bachelor's, master's, and doctoral degrees and became educators in the arts and sciences.

== Early life and education ==
La Vinia Delois Jennings attended Meadville Elementary School and Halifax County Junior High School. She graduated from Halifax County Senior High School and was senior class secretary. Jennings took a bachelor of science degree in mass communications from Virginia Commonwealth University in Richmond, where she was exposed to noted journalism scholars like David Manning White who had developed the “gatekeeper” theory and published extensively on mass culture. During her junior and senior years, she wrote articles for The Commonwealth Times, the university's tabloid-format newspaper, contributing feature interviews with Ossie Davis and Nikki Giovanni and sociological interviews and discussions on the black homosexual and black Greek organizations. Because The Commonwealth Times, at that time, did not adequately address the university or racial concerns of people of color or offer them equal opportunity to hone their writing skills, she joined with a corps of students—Marilyn Campbell, Ahmad Nurriddin, Pat Sherman, Sylvia Hicks, Keith Dabney, Jesse E. Vaughan Jr. and others—to found Reflections In Ink, an alternative campus newspaper. She was the paper's first executive editor, and the publication was an important professionalizing stepping stone for its staff and contributors. Jesse E. Vaughan Jr., for example, went on to work in electronic media and win twenty-seven Emmy Awards. Jennings also served as guests receptionist for the student-run Lecture Committee headed by Alexander "Buddy" Bryant. The appointment allowed her to establish professional and inspirational ties with singer Melba Moore, poets Maya Angelou and Carolyn Rodgers, social historian Lerone Bennett Jr., news anchor Max Robinson, and many others. At her graduation, she was recognized with Virginia Commonwealth University President Edmund F. Ackell's Service and Leadership award.

== Career ==
Immediately after her graduation from Virginia Commonwealth University, Seamark, Inc., Communicating Arts Consultants, based in the former Norfolk Public Library in Norfolk, Virginia, hired Jennings as its copywriter. Time Life also offered her a position in its Chicago office, but after a short time at Seamark, she opted to obtain a master of art in literature at Longwood University in Farmville, Virginia. She submitted “A Dramatic Adaption of William Hoffman’s Novel A Death of Dreams” as her thesis. Jennings then returned to Virginia Commonwealth University as a writing instructor for one year before leaving to pursue a doctorate in twentieth-century American and British literature at the University of North Carolina at Chapel Hill.

At the University of North Carolina, Jennings was J. Carlyle Sitterson Professor Trudier Harris's first dissertation student. Noted Southern literature specialist Louis D. Rubin Jr. also served as a reader for her 1989 dissertation, “Sexual Violence in the Works of Richard Wright, James Baldwin, and Toni Morrison.” After graduating, she accepted a position as a twentieth-century American literature and culture specialist with the English Department at the University of Tennessee in Knoxville. University of North Carolina English Department head Joseph M. Flora and Professor Robert Bain's recruitment of her to write the chapter on Alice Childress for their Contemporary Poets, Dramatists, Essayists, and Novelists of the South led to her publishing Alice Childress (1995), the first book-length study on the Charleston, South Carolina, actress, novelist, and playwright and returning to print in 2006 Childress's only adult novel, A Short Walk (1979). A Choice reviewer called Alice Childress a “careful in-depth study” and “an excellent work of dedicated scholarship.”

Jennings received the John C. Hodges Excellence in Teaching Award, presented by the University of Tennessee's English Department, in 1994, and the Junior Faculty Teaching Award, given by the College of Arts and Sciences, in 1995. In 1999, she received the Jefferson Prize, an award given by the Chancellor and one of the University's highest. In 1998, Dr. Jennings was appointed a Fulbright Senior Lecturer at the University of Málaga in the south of Spain.

In 2008, Jennings won the Toni Morrison Society's Book Prize for Toni Morrison and the Idea of Africa (Cambridge UP). The critical study reveals the fundamental role African traditional religious symbols play in Morrison's work and the ways the Nobel Laureate and Pulitzer Prize-winning author uses—in her landscapes, interior spaces, and on the bodies of her characters—symbols brought to the Americas by enslaved West Africans. Her analysis of these symbols demonstrates that a West African collective worldview informs both Morrison's work and contemporary African-American life and culture. Other books published by her included At Home and Abroad: Historicizing Twentieth Century Whiteness in Literature and Performance (U of Tennessee P, 2009), Zora Neale Hurston, Haiti, and Their Eyes Were Watching God (Northwestern UP, 2013), and Margaret Garner: The Premiere Performances of Toni Morrison’s Libretto (U of Virginia P, 2016). On May 25, 2018, the Margaret Garner volume received the Toni Morrison Society Book Prize 2015–17 for Best Edited Book on the work of the Nobel laureate.
