= Justice Jennings =

Justice Jennings may refer to:

- Newell Jennings (1883–1965), associate justice of the Connecticut Supreme Court
- Renz L. Jennings (1899–1983), associate justice of the Arizona Supreme Court
