= Zilpher Jennings =

American Samoan politician

Member of the House of Representatives
- In office 1953–1954
- Preceded by: office vacant
- Succeeded by: office vacant
- Constituency: Swains Island

Personal details
- Born: 13 June 1928 Swains Island, American Samoa
- Died: 13 August 1961 (aged 33) Fagatogo, American Samoa

Zilpher Margaret Jennings Reed (13 June 1928 – 13 August 1961) was an American Samoan politician. In 1953 she was one of the first two women elected to the Fono, when she won a seat in the House of Representatives.

== Early and personal life ==
Jennings was born in Swains Island in 1928, the daughter of Margaret (née Pedro) and Eli Jennings, the owner of the island. She married Fritz John Reed, with whom she had two sons in 1956 and 1958.

== Career ==
Jennings worked as a secretary in the Department of Administration of American Samoa.

In the 1953 legislative elections, in her mid-twenties, she was elected to the House of Representatives from Swains Island, one of two women elected to the House alongside Mabel Reid. She was the first representative elected in American Samoa's first popular election by secret ballot, as Swain's Island's election took place earlier than the other islands due to its geographic location.

She died in 1961.
