= Michael Jennings =

Michael or Mike Jennings may refer to:

- Michael Jennings (American football) (born 1979), American football player
- Michael Jennings (boxer) (born 1977), English professional boxer
- Michael Jennings (rugby league) (born 1988), Australian professional rugby league footballer
- Mike Jennings (rugby union), South African rugby union player
- a fictional character played by Michael Caine in the movie On Deadly Ground
- a fictional character played by Ben Affleck in the movie Paycheck
