= James Jennings =

James or Jim Jennings may refer to:

- James Jennings (MP) English landowner and Tory politician
- James Jennings (footballer), English professional footballer
- James D. Jennings, Younger brother of Waylon Jennings and founder, owner, and operator of Waymore's Liquor Store
- James T. Jennings, Union Army soldier and Medal of Honor recipient
- Jim Jennings (American football), American football player
- Jim Jennings (basketball), American basketball player
