= Kenneth Jennings =

Ken Jennings (born 1974) is an American game show contestant and Jeopardy! host.

Ken Jennings or Kenneth Jennings may also refer to:

- Ken Jennings (actor) (born 1947), American actor
- Kenneth Jennings (conductor) (1925–2015), American choral conductor and composer
- Kenneth Jennings (cricketer) (born 1953), South African cricketer
- Kenneth Jennings (priest) (1930–2007), Dean of Gloucester
