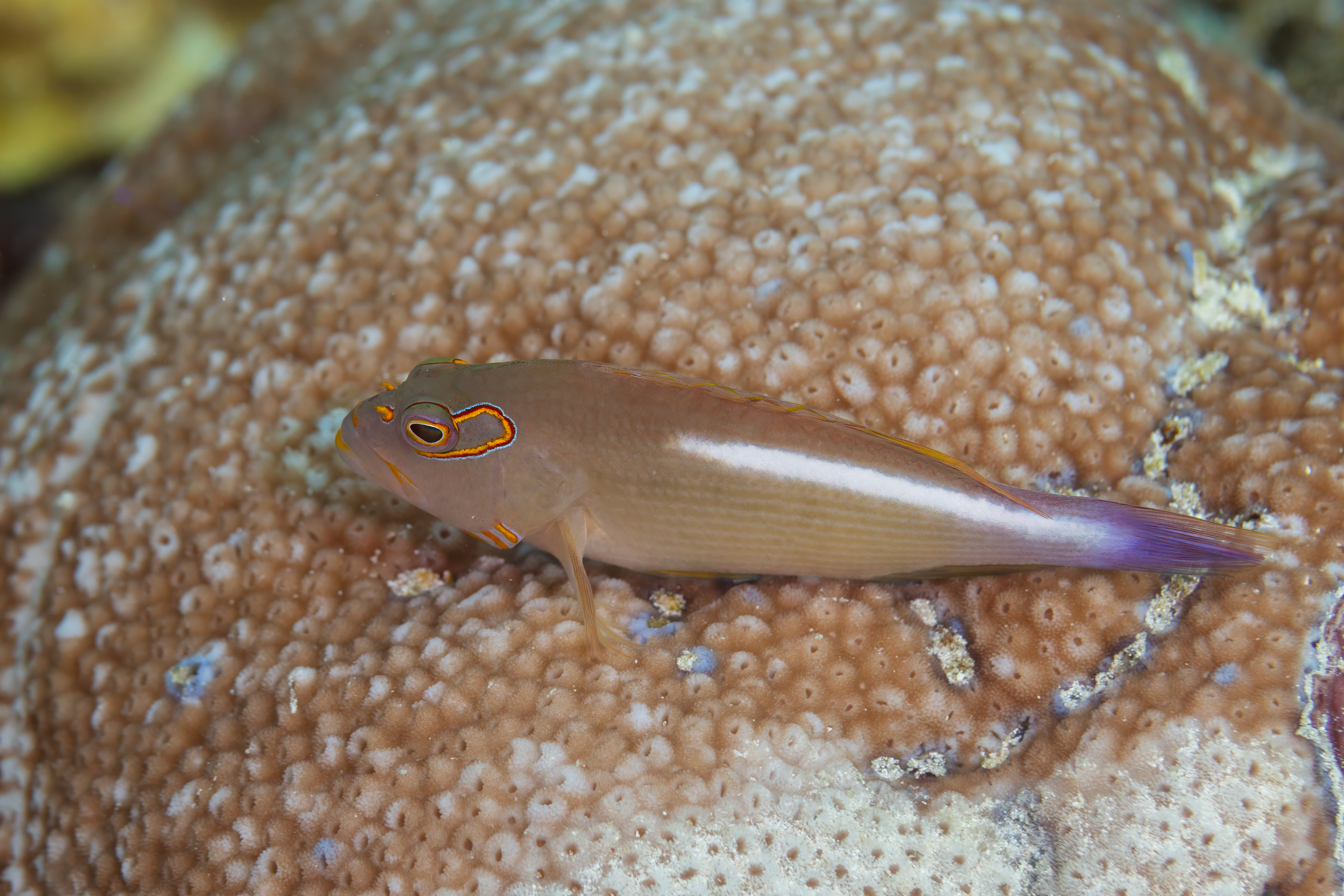
- Paracirrhites arcatus in Zanzibar (Tanzania)

Conservation status
- Least Concern (IUCN 3.1)

Scientific classification
- Kingdom: Animalia
- Phylum: Chordata
- Class: Actinopterygii
- Division: Teleostei
- Order: Centrarchiformes
- Family: Cirrhitidae
- Genus: Paracirrhites
- Species: P. arcatus

Binomial name
- Paracirrhites arcatus (G. Cuvier, 1829)

Synonyms
- Cirrhites arcatus G. Cuvier, 1829; Amblycirrhitus arcatus (G. Cuvier, 1829); Gymnocirrhites arcatus (G. Cuvier, 1829); Cirrhites amblycephalus Bleeker, 1857; Paracirrhites amblycephalus (Bleeker, 1857)

= Arc-eye hawkfish =

Species of fish

The arc-eye hawkfish, ringeye hawkfish, horseshoe hawkfish, or whiteline hawkfish (Paracirrhites arcatus), is a species of marine fish in the family Cirrhitidae (hawkfishes). It is found in shallow waters in the tropical Indo-Pacific on reefs, resting on coral heads much of the time.

== Taxonomy ==
The arc-eye hawkfish was first formally described in 1829 as Cirrhites arcatus by the French zoologist Georges Cuvier with the type locality given as Mauritius. The specific name arcatus means "arched", an allusion which Cuvier did not explain but it may refer to the horseshoe shaped mark behind the eye. Some authorities treat Paracirrhites amblycephalus as a valid species but Fishbase treats this taxon as a synonym of P. arcatus.

== Description ==
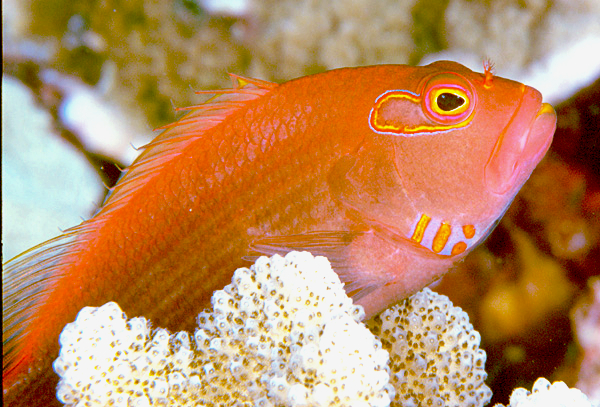
Arc-eye hawkfish at Kona, Hawaii

The arc-eye hawkfish has a relatively deep body, the standard length being around 2.7 times its length. It has a smooth upper preopercular margin and a slightly rounded to truncate caudal fin. The dorsal fin contains 10 spines and 11 soft rays while the anal fin has 3 spines and 6 soft rays, each dorsal fin spine being tipped with a branched cirrus. This species reaches a maximum published total length of 20 cm (7.9 in). This species has a variable background colour on the body, the typical colour being pale pinkish brown. There is a horseshoe-shaped mark to the rear of the eye that consists of three thin lines. The gill cover has three orange bands set in a light blue area. A white to pink stripe is frequently present from around halfway along the flank and running to the rear.

== Distribution and habitat ==
The arc-eye hawkfish is widespread in the tropical Indo-Pacific. Its range extends from East to South Africa eastwards across the Indian Ocean into the Pacific Ocean east to the Hawaiian Islands and Pitcairn Islands, north to Japan and south to Australia. In Australia it has been recorded from off Shark Bay to the Muiron Islands and offshore reefs of Western Australia, at Ashmore Reef in the Timor Sea, and from the northern Great Barrier Reef and reefs in the Coral Sea south to the Solitary Islands in New South Wales. It has also been recorded at the Australian Indian Ocean territories of Christmas Island and the Cocos (Keeling) Islands; and the Tasman Sea locations of Middleton Reef, Elizabeth Reef and Norfolk Island. It is a benthic species associated with coral reefs. It usually can be found in lagoon and seaward reefs, at a depth of 1–30 m (3 ft 3 in – 98 ft 5 in), with a maximum of 91 m (299 ft).

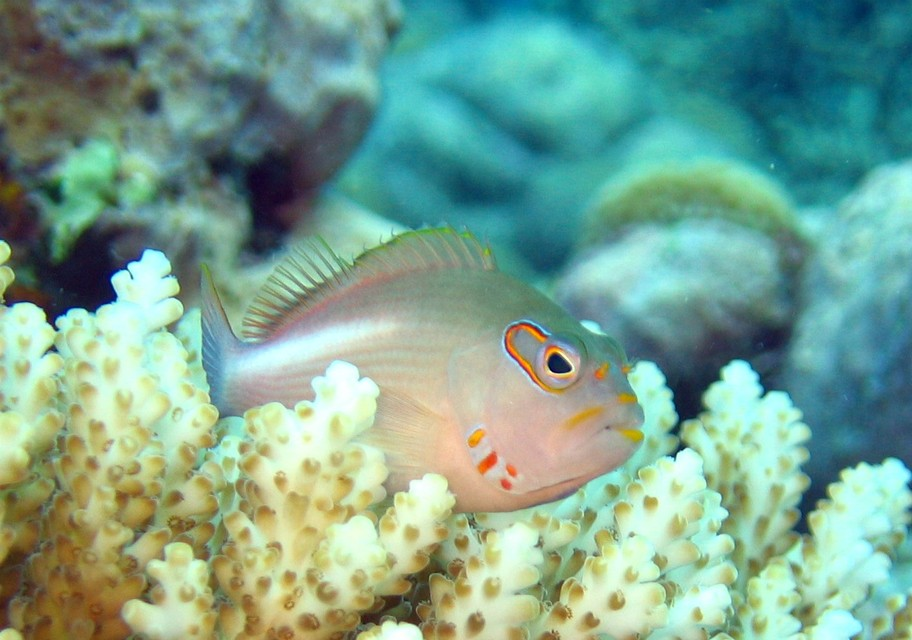
P. arcatus at Great Barrier Reef

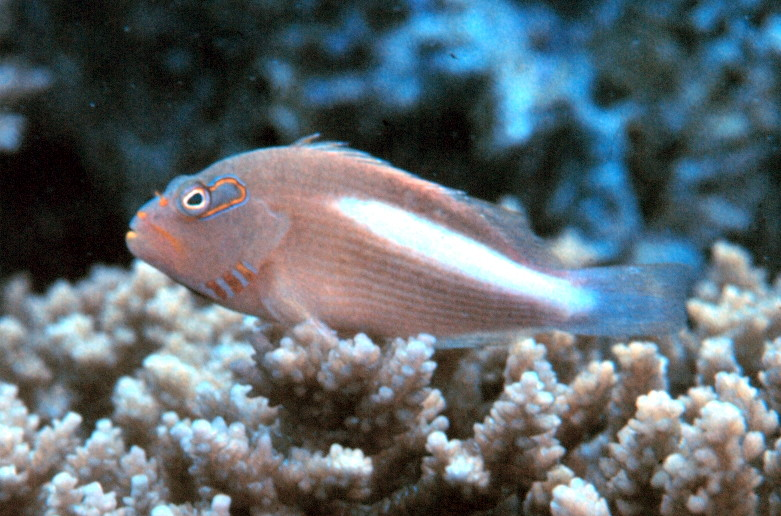
P. arcatus at Atol Chuuk

== Biology ==
The arc-eye hawkfish is typically seen sitting motionless on the reef amongst corals. It prefers the heads of Pocillopora, Stylophora and Acropora corals and is solitary. It preys mostly on shrimps, small fishes, crabs, and other crustaceans. There are main colour morphs and these occur together with the darker fish on basalt dominated areas and the pale fish on corals, the different fish frequently being only a few metres from each other. They form pairs to spawn, the pair ascending into the water column to release their gametes.

== Utilisation ==
The arc-eye hawkfish is collected for, and is a relatively common species in, the aquarium trade.
