= Gerald H. Jennings =

Gerald Jennings (born 1946) is a British aquarist and ichthyological taxonomist who has specialised in both the production of databases related to the identification of species and the production of simplified printed guides to fish identification. He has authored and co-authored over 100 books on fishes and fish related subjects. His photographic library has also been made freely available online.

== Works ==
- Jennings, G. H.(1995–2004) Mediterranean Fishes. Calypso Publications. ISBN 0-906301-97-1
- Jennings, Gerald (1996 on) Sea and Freshwater Fishes of Arabia (series).Calypso Publications.ISBN 0906301 57 2
- Jennings, G. et al. (1996) The Calypso Ichthyological Database. Calypso Publications. ISBN 0-906301-47-5
- Hall, T. R., Ford, Dr. D., Carrington, Dr. N., Jennings, G. H. et al. A History of Tropical Marine Fishkeeping in the U.K.1960–1980 (1997) Calypso Publications. ISBN 0-906301-99-8
- Jennings, G. H. (1997) Asian Freshwater Fishes. ISBN 0-90630-148-3
