= List of islands of Tokelau =

This is a list of coral islands on the atolls of Tokelau. There are three primary atolls in Tokelau—Atafu, Nukunonu, and Fakaofo—which are further broken apart into these islands:

- Ahua
- Apia
- Avakilikili
- Awtano
- Fale
- Fatigauhu
- Fenua Fala
- Fenua Loa
- Lalo
- Laulauia
- Matangi
- Motu Akea
- Motufala
- Motuhaga
- Mulifenua
- Niututahi
- Nukulakia
- Nukumatau
- Punalei
- Saumagalu
- Saumatafanga
- Sikatai
- Taulagapapa
- Te Fakanava
- Te Kamu
- Te Puka e Mua
- Te Puku
- Teafua
- Tokelau (atoll)

== See also ==
- List of islets in Tokelau
- List of villages in Tokelau
