= 2006 Tokelauan self-determination referendum =

- 11–15 February 2006
- Do you agree that Tokelau become a self-governing state in Free Association with New Zealand on the basis of the Constitution and as in the draft Treaty notified to Tokelau?

Results
Choice	Votes	%
Yes	349	60.07%
No	232	39.93%
Valid votes	581	99.49%
Invalid or blank votes	3	0.51%
Total votes	584	100.00%
Registered voters/turnout	615	94.96%

A self-determination referendum was held in Tokelau between 11 and 15 February 2006, supervised by the United Nations, The proposal would have changed Tokelau's status from an unincorporated New Zealand territory to a self-governing state in free association with New Zealand, akin to the Cook Islands and Niue. However, although 60% of voters voted in favour, a two-thirds majority was required for the proposal to succeed.

The majority of Tokelauans reside in New Zealand, and were ineligible to vote in the referendum, in line with standard practice in United Nations mandated votes on self-determination. However concerns among this community may have influenced those who were eligible to vote, thereby contributing to the referendum's failure.

The passage of the referendum would have removed Tokelau from the United Nations list of non-self-governing territories, as the Cook Islands and Niue were removed from this list when they were granted self-governance in 1965 and 1974 respectively.

== Voting schedule ==
Date	Location
11 February	Apia, Samoa (Special overseas voting)
13 February	Atafu atoll
14 February	Nukunonu atoll
15 February	Fakaofo atoll

== Results ==
Do you agree that Tokelau become a self-governing state in Free Association with New Zealand on the basis of the Constitution and as in the draft Treaty notified to Tokelau?

Choice	Votes	%
For	349	60.07
Against	232	39.93
Total	581	100.00
Valid votes	581	99.49
Invalid/blank votes	3	0.51
Total votes	584	100.00
Registered voters/turnout	615	94.96

== Aftermath ==
Outgoing Tokelau Ulu (head of government) Pio Tuia suggested in February 2006 that since the vote failed to pass by such a small margin, the issue was likely to be revisited in a few years' time. In June 2006, his successor Kolouei O'Brien announced that the Fono had agreed to hold a similar referendum again in late 2007 or early 2008; in the end, it was decided to hold a second referendum on self-determination in October 2007.

An unintended result of the United Nations' recent efforts to promote decolonization in Tokelau has been the re-emergence of a Tokelauan claim to Swains Island, which is legally part of American Samoa, hitherto a somewhat dormant issue.
