= List of villages in Tokelau =

This is a list of the main villages on the coral islands of Tokelau. There are no other settlements in Tokelau that are bigger.

Village	Population	Atoll	Coordinates
Atafu Village	(about 500)	Atafu	8.5335° S, 172.5166° W
Nukunonu	(about 420)	Nukunonu	9.1978° S, 171.8508° W
Fakaofo	(about 310)	Fakaofo	9.3803° S, 171.2188° W
Fale	(about 120)	Fakaofo	9.3844° S, 171.2484° W
Fenua Fala	(-)	Fakaofo	
