= 2017 Tokelauan general election =

- 23–31 January 2017

All 20 seats in the General Fono
Trio of Ulu-o-Tokelau before election
Kuresa Nasau
Afega Gaualofa
Siopili Perez
Trio of Ulu-o-Tokelau after election
Kelihiano Kalolo
Afega Gaualofa
Siopili Perez

General elections were held in Tokelau between 23 and 31 January 2017.

== Electoral system ==
The 21 members of Parliament were elected from three seven-seat constituencies corresponding to the three villages on the island, Atafu, Fakaofo and Nukunonu.

Within each constituency, there are five separate positions; the Faipule (atoll leader) designate, the Pulenuku (village mayor) designate, the Fatupaepae (Council of Women) representative, the Taulelea/Aumaga (Men's Group) representative and three Taupulega (village elder) representatives.

== Results ==
Position	Atafu	Fakaofo	Nukunonu
Faipule designate	Kelihiano Kalolo	Afega Gaualofa	Siopili Perez
Pulenuku designate	Fano Fao	Mose Pelasio	Patelesio Petelo
Fatupaepae representative	Latu Lopa	Malia Pue	Lepeka Amato-Perez
Taulelea/Aumaga representative	Tanu Filo	Alesana Teao	Falaniko Aloisio
Taupulega representatives	Iosua Aleni; Seluka Enosa; Mika Kalolo	Tinielu Tuumuli; Taupati Peleni; Ilai Esera	Salesio Lui; Lino Isaia; Alapati Tavite
Source: Government of Tokelau
