= 2007 Tokelauan self-determination referendum =

- 20, 22–24 October 2007
- Tokelau become a self-governing state in free association with New Zealand on the basis of the Constitution and the Treaty.
- Outcome: Proposal failed as two-thirds quorum not met

Results
Choice	Votes	%
Yes	446	64.45%
No	246	35.55%
Valid votes	692	99.28%
Invalid or blank votes	5	0.72%
Total votes	697	100.00%
Registered voters/turnout	789	88.34%

A referendum on self-determination was held in Tokelau on 20 October and on 22–24 October 2007, with the result being that self-governance was rejected. Had it been successful, the referendum would have changed Tokelau's status from an unincorporated New Zealand territory to a self-governing state in free association with New Zealand, akin to the Cook Islands and Niue. However, the referendum required a two-thirds positive vote to pass, and the "yes" side fell short of the required total by 16 votes.

The referendum was open to Tokelauans aged 18 or older, with 789 people eligible to vote. A majority of two-thirds of voters was necessary for the referendum to be accepted.

After the narrow failure of the first such referendum in 2006, it was decided that another referendum would be held late the following year. Tokelau's leaders believe that concerns among Tokelauan expatriates were a factor in the failure of the 2006 referendum, even though they were not eligible to vote, and assured them that they would not lose their rights to return to Tokelau if the 2007 referendum had passed. There were 23% more people eligible to vote in the 2007 referendum than in the previous year's.

The schedule was:

- 20 October: Apia, Samoa (overseas voting). 63 votes cast.
- 22 October: Fakaofo
- 23 October: Nukunonu
- 24 October: Atafu

Had the proposal succeeded, a date would have been set, most likely in mid-2008, for the "day of self government". However, the proposal failed again by an even smaller margin – 16 more "yes" votes would have been needed to approve it. It is possible that the issue will be voted on again in the future; the leader of the largest group of overseas Tokelauans (the Tokelauan community in the Hutt Valley in New Zealand) Henry Joseph called for another vote within two years, with the required approval being changed to a simple majority.

== Results ==
Choice	Votes	%
For	446	64.45
Against	246	35.55
Total	692	100.00
Valid votes	692	99.28
Invalid/blank votes	5	0.72
Total votes	697	100.00
Registered voters/turnout	789	88.34
Source: Direct Democracy
