= Isaako =

Isaako is both a given name and surname. Notable people with the name include:

- Isaako Aaitui (born 1987), American football nose tackle
- Jamayne Isaako (born 1996), New Zealand rugby league player
- Patuki Isaako, Tokelauan political figure
