= Awtano =

Coordinates: 09°25′00″S 171°12′00″W

Awtano is a member of the Fakaofo island group of Tokelau.

== See also ==
- Saumatafanga
