= Falima Teao =

New Zealand politician (born 1931)

Faipule Falima Teao

5th Ulu-o-Tokelau
- In office February 1997 – February 1998
- Preceded by: Pio Tuia
- Succeeded by: Kuresa Nasau

Falima Teao (born 1931) was the Ulu-o-Tokelau, or head of government, of Tokelau from February 1997 to February 1998. He was also the faipule, or chief head of council, of the atoll of Fakaofo from January 1996 to January 1999. The position of ulu of Tokelau rotates annually between the three faipule (one for each of the three atolls), who are elected for terms lasting three years.

In 2004, Teao was one of the two dentists resident on Fakaofo.
