= Fenua Fala =

Coordinates: 9°22′S 171°16′W

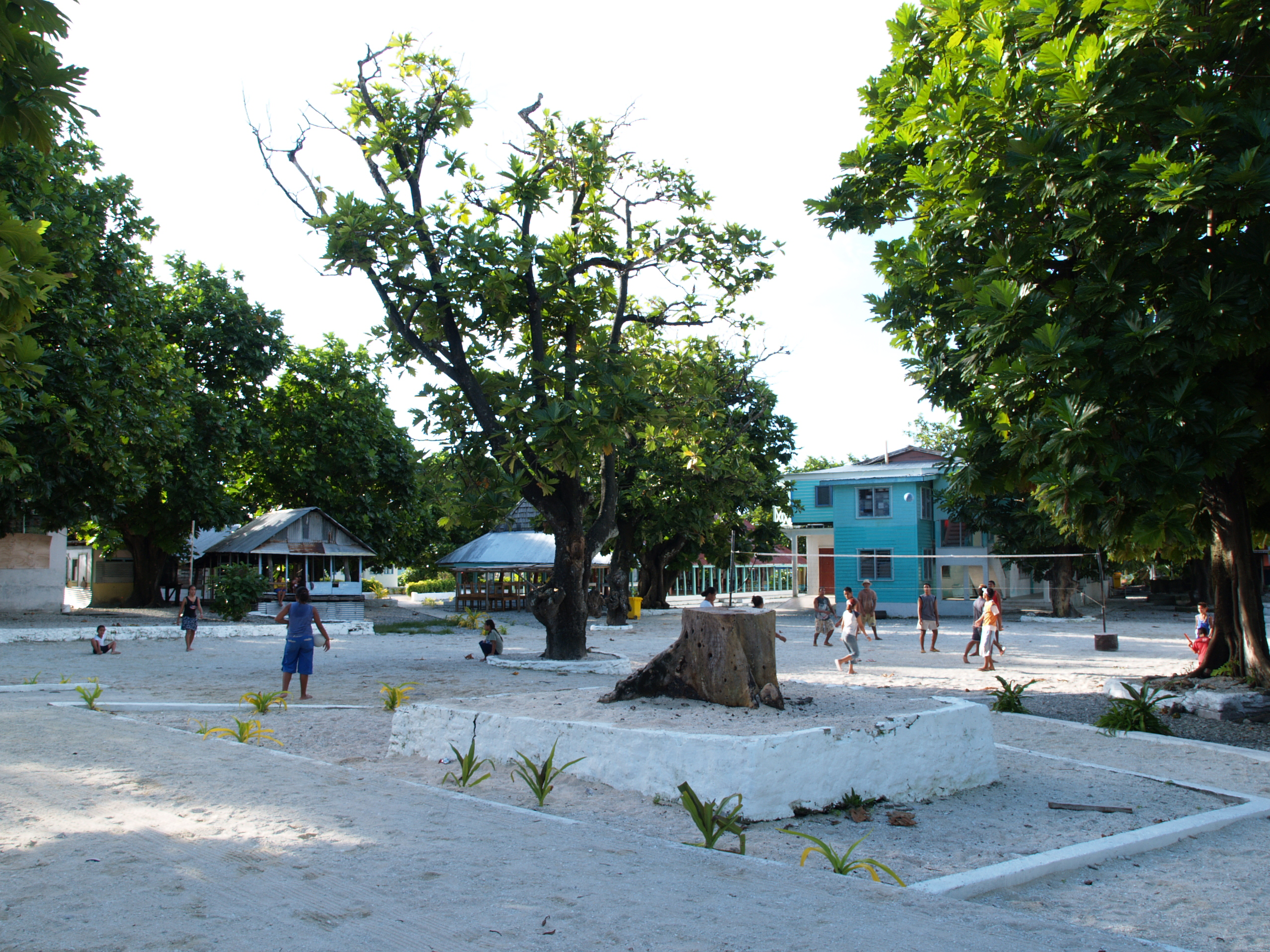
Fakaofo village square in Fenua Fala Island

Fenua Fala is one of the four inhabited islets that make up the Fakaofo Atoll in Tokelau, a non-self-governing territory of New Zealand in the Pacific Ocean. It serves as the primary residential area for the Fakaofo community, having been established in 1960 to address overcrowding on the traditional village islet of Fale. Life on Fenua Fala is linked to the marine environment and the limited resources available, with broader concerns of climate change and rising sea-levels.

== History ==
Fenua Fala was established as a new village site on Fakaofo Atoll in 1960. This relocation was initiated due to severe overcrowding on the traditional, smaller islet of Fale, which had been the primary settlement for centuries. The construction of the new village was supported by New Zealand, which significantly expanded the residential space for the community.

== Geography ==
Fenua Fala is one of the islets in Tokelau, a non-self-governing territory of New Zealand in the Pacific Ocean. It is part of the Fakaofo Atoll, the southern most group of islands of Tokelau. It is located about 2 km (1.2 mi) to the west of the original settlement in Fale. The settlement is surrounded by concrete walls to protect it from the sea. The island is low-lying, and is susceptible to climate change, and rising sea levels. It is surrounded by coral reefs, which support aquatic life such as seaweed, sea cucumber, giant clam, octopus, and fishes.

== Demographics ==
The settlement hosts a population of about 400 individuals. The local administration is taken care by Taupulega, a governing body made up of invited elders from the local community. The settlement hosts the Fakaofo hospital, Tialeniu School and other facilities. It is also the location of Teletok, Tokelau's only telecommunications provider. There are also three churches to cater to its total population, which is made up of 70% Protestants and 22% Catholics.
