= Kuresa Nasau =

Tokelauan politician

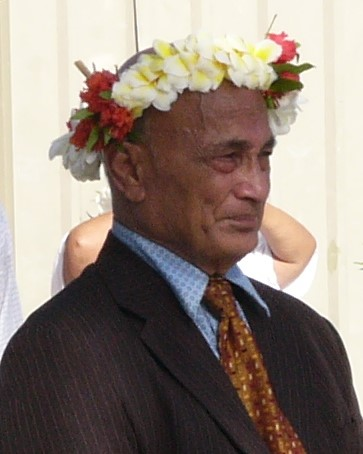

Ulu-o-Tokelau
- In office February 2014 – 23 February 2015
- Preceded by: Salesio Lui
- Succeeded by: Siopili Perez
- In office 22 March 2010 – 11 March 2011
- Preceded by: Foua Toloa
- Succeeded by: Foua Toloa
- In office February 2007 – 23 February 2008
- Preceded by: Kolouei O'Brien
- Succeeded by: Pio Tuia
- In office February 2001 – February 2002
- Preceded by: Kolouei O'Brien
- Succeeded by: Pio Tuia
- In office February 1998 – February 1999
- Preceded by: Falima Teao
- Succeeded by: Pio Tuia

Kuresa Nasau is a Tokelauan politician who has served as head of government (Tokelauan: Ulu o Tokelau) five times and as faipule of Atafu.

Nasau lost his seat in the 2011 election, but was re-elected in 2014. He lost his seat again in the 2017 election. In 2017, after the election, it was revealed that he had made several controversial capital investment decisions, including the purchase of two helicopters.

Terms of office as Ulu o Tokelau:

- February 1998 – February 1999
- February 2001 – February 2002
- February 2007 – February 2008
- 22 March 2010 – 11 March 2011
- February 2014 – 23 February 2015
