= Tui Tokelau =

Polynesian god

Tui Tokelau is a god worshipped in Tokelau in the Pacific. Before the arrival of Christianity in the islands, Tui Tokelau was the primary god along with the usual pantheon of Polynesian gods. The marae of the village of Fakaofo on Fakaofo atoll was the location of a house that contained a monumental coral slab personifying Tui Tokelau, which was covered with beautiful mats. The principal chief (ariki) was the chief priest.

During the month of May, all the people of the islands of Tokelau assembled at Fakaofo, and prepared a feast, and prayed to Tui Tokelau to protect them. This ceremony represented the new year. The ceremonial proceedings during May included offerings of fish, coconuts and pandanus drupes. A fire was lit in the temple, and the people danced during the night.
