= Kolouei O'Brien =

Tokelauan politician (1939–2015)

Head of the Government of Tokelau (Ulu)
- In office February 2000 – February 2001; February 2003 – February 2004; 15 February 2006 – 27 February 2007
- Preceded by: Pio Tuia (2000), (2003), (2006)
- Succeeded by: Kuresa Nasau (2001), (2007); Patuki Isaako (2004)

Personal details
- Spouse: Limalei Ane Filipo

Kolouei O'Brien (1939 – 11 May 2015) was a politician from Tokelau and faipule of Fakaofo. He served as the head of government of Tokelau three times, from February 2000 until February 2001, from February 2003 until February 2004, and from February 2006 until February 2007. Kolouei O'Brien had a master's degree in navigation/yachting. He was born at Fakaofo and died at his home there on 11 May 2015.
