= Bangsamoro Juridical Entity =

Bangsamoro
- Proposed associated state
- Bangsamoro Juridical Entity
- Map showing the maximum possible extent of the Bangsamoro Juridical Entity
- Sovereign state: Philippines
- Demonym(s): Bangsamoro

The Bangsamoro Juridical Entity (BJE) was a proposed subdivision in the Philippines spanning portions of Mindanao and Palawan. Conceptualized during the peace talks between the government of the Philippines during the administration of President Gloria Macapagal Arroyo and the Moro Islamic Liberation Front (MILF), the BJE was the proposed expanded successor to the Autonomous Region in Muslim Mindanao (ARMM).

A memorandum of agreement on ancestral domain (MOA-AD) was to be signed between the Philippine government and the MILF on August 4, 2008, but the Supreme Court stopped the signing over concerns of the deal's constitutionality. The high court would rule the MOA-AD unconstitutional on October 4, 2008, which led to the collapse of the peace talks between the two parties.

== History ==
=== Background ===
The Moro Islamic Liberation Front (MILF) had been fighting for the secession of Bangsamoro territory from the Philippines. Peace talks, which had been on-and-off, between the MILF and the Philippine government began in 1997.

President Joseph Estrada launched a military campaign or an "all out war" against the MILF in 2000 in a bid to resolve the Moro conflict. In contrast, His successor Gloria Macapagal Arroyo pursued negotiation with the MILF although the Philippine military engaged the rebel group in 2003 in Buliok.

=== Negotiations ===
Flag of the Moro Islamic Liberation Front

Peace talks gained traction in 2003 when Malaysia became involved as a mediator.

As a compromise, the MILF and the Philippine national government had agreed to set up the Bangsamoro Juridical Entity (BJE), a subdivision that would be potentially bigger and have more autonomy than the then-extant Autonomous Region in Muslim Mindanao (ARMM).

By November 2007, the two parties have agreed upon the geographical scope of the BJE and projects that a deal could be signed by August 2008.

On July 16, 2008, the MILF and the Philippine government announced that they had finalized a deal and was set to sign a memorandum of agreement on ancestral domain (MOA-AD) on August 5, 2008, in Kuala Lumpur, which would set the framework for the establishment of the BJE.

=== Collapse of talks and return to conflict ===
The proposed MOA-AD between the MILF and the Philippine government was met with opposition from legislators and groups who believed that the deal would eventually result in the secession of parts of Southern Philippines. Likewise, the Lumads also expressed concern that they were not consulted regarding the BJE and that the proposed territory of the BJE would encroach on their own ancestral domains. Leaders of local government units outside the ARMM also expressed concern of losing jurisdiction of some of their areas to the proposed BJE, and opposition figures suspected that President Arroyo was using the BJE as a ploy to extend her tenure in anticipation that the constitution had to be amended to comply with the MOA-AD. During the negotiations, the contents of the MOA-AD were largely confidential, and when it was finalized, there were demands for its content to be publicly disclosed.

The issue was raised to the Supreme Court of the Philippines, which released a temporary restraining order on August 4, 2008, which prevented the signing of the MOA-AD.

Armed clashes between the MILF and the government occurred in North Cotabato and Lanao del Norte on August 7, 2008. According to the Philippine military, they launched a pursuit against MILF commanders Abdullah Makapaar and Ameril Umbra Kato who allegedly attacked civilians.

On September 3, 2008, the government announced it would be dissolving the government peace panel and that the document would not be signed "in light of recent violent incidents committed by lawless violent groups".

On October 3, 2008, the Consortium of Bangsamoro Civil Society (CBCS) organized a rally in Marawi against the Philippine military's operation, which displaced civilians, and alleged that the military collaborated with the vigilante group Ilaga. They also urged the Organisation of Islamic Cooperation and the United Nations's intervention.

The Supreme Court released on October 14, 2008, a ruling that the proposed MOA-AD was unconstitutional.

MILF chief negotiator Mohagher Iqbal expressed that his organization lost trust to the Philippine government since it dissolved the panel even prior to the Supreme Court ruling and that it unilaterally set up disarmament, demobilization and rehabilitation (DDR) as precondition for the restart of peace talks.

=== Aftermath ===
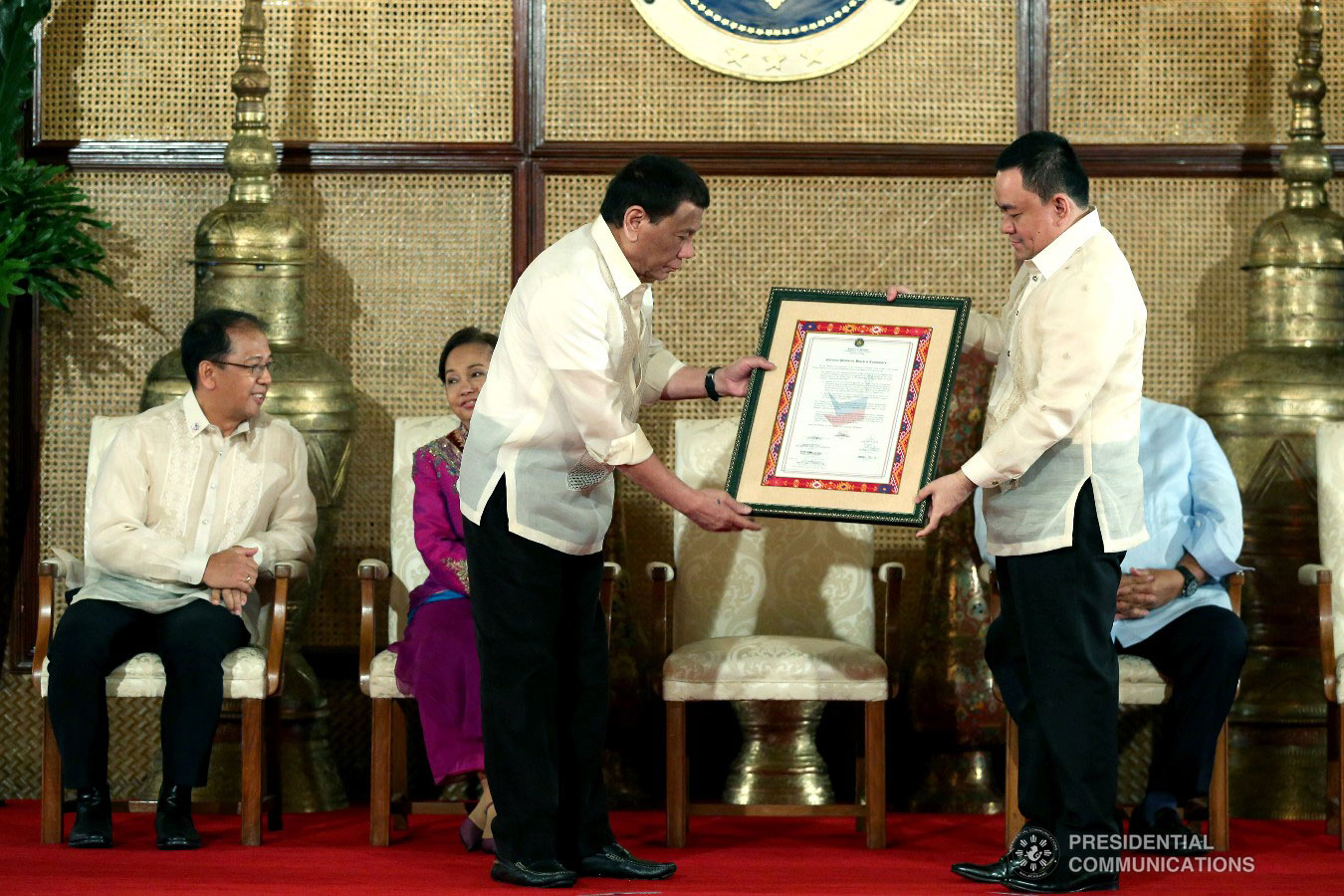
President Rodrigo Duterte (standing, left) receives the result of the 2019 plebiscite for the Bangsamoro Organic Law, from COMELEC Chairman Sheriff Abas during a ceremony at the Malacañang Palace.

The BJE was never realized. Under Arroyo's successor, President Benigno Aquino III, peace talks between the MILF and the Philippine government continued.

The Office of the Presidential Adviser on the Peace Process released a statement in September 2012 clarifying that the two parties were not entertaining the concept of the BJE anymore. Under the April 2012 Decision Points on Principles, the two parties agreed on several issues including on working for "the creation of a new autonomous political entity (NPE) in place of the ARMM"

The NPE established would be the Bangsamoro Autonomous Region in Muslim Mindanao, which succeeded the ARMM in 2019 after a successful plebiscite held during the administration of President Rodrigo Duterte.

The BARMM's charter is the Bangsamoro Organic Law (BOL). The BOL as a bill was subjected to scrutiny regarding its constitutionality like the 2008 MOA-AD.

== Geographical scope ==
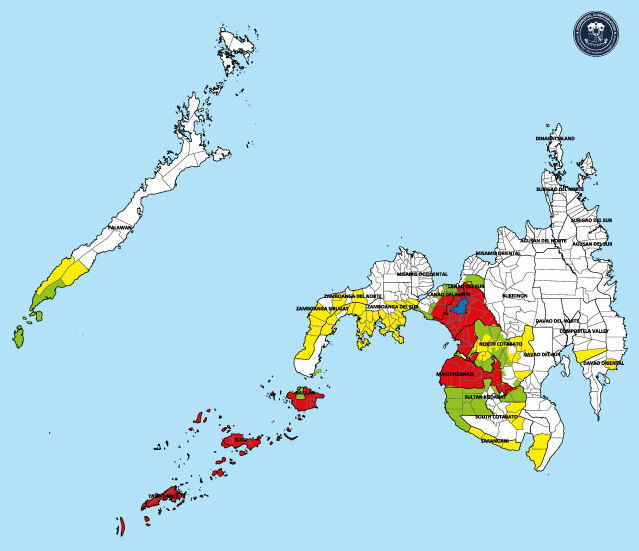
Possible scope of the Bangsamoro Juridical Entity (BJE): Core territory Expansion areas; 12 months after the creation of the BJE, Special Intervention Areas; Possible expansion areas 25 years after the signing of the Comprehensive Compact.

The BJE would at least cover all territories of its intended predecessor, the ARMM. The ARMM territories were considered to be the "core territory" of the proposed BJE. A plebiscite was proposed to be held twelve months after the creation of the BJE for the possible inclusion of additional territories to the BJE. A third area category would be the special intervention areas, which were defined as conflict-affected areas outside the BJE that were subject to special socioeconomic and cultural affirmative action implemented by the Philippine national government. A second plebiscite would be held 25 years after the signing of a comprehensive compact between the MILF and the Philippine government, which would determine if the special intervention areas would be included in the BJE.

== Proposed government ==
In its ruling declaring the MOA-AD unconstitutional, the Supreme Court ruled that the proposed BJE would have been an associated state or "a state in all but name", "as it meets the criteria of a state". It considered the proposed "associative relationship" envisioned between the central government of the Philippines and the BJE unconstitutional. The BJE was also referred to as an autonomous political region and a federal state.

While the MOA-AD served as a framework for the BJE, it was not a comprehensive agreement. The possibility of the amendment of the 1987 Philippine constitution was raised to be able to fulfill the provisions of a then-anticipated peace deal between the MILF and the Philippine government.

Marawi Bishop Edwin dela Peña proposed the BJE to be an Islamic state with sharia law applicable to Muslims.
