= Associated state =

Minor partner in a formal, free relationship with a typically larger state

An associated state is a state that is the minor partner in a formal free relationship with a major party — a larger state — that allows the former to share aspects of governance, such as defense, foreign policy, and economy, with the latter. Five states are in a formal relation of free association: the Cook Islands and Niue are in free association with New Zealand, whereas the Federated States of Micronesia, the Marshall Islands and Palau are in free association with the United States.

The details of such “free association” are contained in United Nations General Assembly Resolution 1541 (XV) Principle VI, a Compact of Free Association or Associated Statehood Act, and are specific to the countries involved. In the case of the Cook Islands and Niue, the details of their free association arrangement are contained in several documents, such as their respective constitutions, the 1983 Exchange of Letters between the governments of New Zealand and the Cook Islands, and the 2001 Joint Centenary Declaration. Free associated states can be described as independent or not, but free association is not a qualification of an entity's statehood or status as a subject of international law.

Informally, the term can be used more loosely: from a post-colonial form of amical protection, or protectorate, to a confederation of unequal members when the lesser partners delegate to the major one (often the former colonial power) some authority normally exclusively retained by a sovereign state, usually in such fields as defence and foreign relations, while often enjoying favourable economic terms such as market access.

== Origin of the concept ==
The concept of associated state was originally used to refer to arrangements under which Western powers afforded a (sometimes very limited) degree of self-government to some of their colonial possessions after the end of World War II. Soon after the conclusion of the war, the French colonial territories of Vietnam, Cambodia, and Laos were designated as 'associated states' within the newly created French Union. The arrangement afforded these countries a limited degree of internal and external sovereignty (for example, they were allowed to enter into diplomatic relations with a small number of countries), but for the most part reserved for France effective control over foreign relations, as well as military, judicial, administrative, and economic activities. The creation of the three associated states of Indochina was realized in 1949. According to some French jurists, the concept of associated state under the 1946 French constitution automatically extended to the territories of Morocco and Tunisia, which up until then had been protectorates of France. However, unlike their counterparts in Southeast Asia, neither Morocco nor Tunisia became part of the French Union. The associated state concept as applied to former French colonial possessions has been described as 'neo-colonial' as it did not afford them real internal or external sovereignty. All of the aforementioned associated states eventually became fully independent states.

Puerto Rico has been a dependent territory of the United States since the Spanish–American War. In the Spanish-language version of its current (1952) constitution it is officially named Estado Libre Asociado de Puerto Rico, which translates to "Free Associated State of Puerto Rico." It exercises substantial internal self-government similar to U.S. states, and is under the sovereignty of the U.S. Constitution. Unlike the Marshall Islands, Micronesia, and Palau, Puerto Rico is not considered to be an associated state under U.S. domestic law, with the English-language Puerto Rican constitution referring to it as a 'commonwealth.' The official Spanish name of Puerto Rico can lead observers to believe that its political status is equivalent to that of the associated states of the Cook Islands, the Marshall Islands, Micronesia, Niue, and Palau. However, unlike these polities, Puerto Rico is not considered a state under international law and scholars usually do not regard it as an associated state similar to the others.

When New Zealand offered an associated status to the Cook Islands, they involved the United Nations and included in the agreement the possibility of future independence. These considerations became relevant in later Special Committee on Decolonisation debates on the West Indies Associated States.

== States currently in a formal association ==
The Cook Islands and Niue have the status of "self-government in free association". New Zealand cannot legislate for them, and in some situations they are considered sovereign states. In foreign relations, both interact as sovereign states, and they have been allowed to sign on as a state to United Nations treaties and bodies. Neither has decided to join the UN, as New Zealand has expressed a view that such a move would lead to their loss of right to automatic acquisition of New Zealand citizenship. (Note: The Cook Islands' unique constitutional and international status, page 9 Cook Islands and Niue do not have citizenship on their own and the Cook Islanders and Niueans have New Zealand citizenship.) In 2025, Cook Islands prime minister Mark Brown stated that the UN confirmed that the Cook Islands did not meet the requirements for UN membership, and foreign minister Tingika Elikana stated that any future decision to join the UN would require a referendum and reevaluation of the relationship with New Zealand. Additionally, a spokesperson for the New Zealand Ministry of Foreign Affairs and Trade stated that "the Cook Islands is not a fully independent and sovereign state". Both Niue and the Cook Islands have established their own immigration regimes.

The Federated States of Micronesia (since 1986), the Marshall Islands (since 1986), and Palau (since 1994) are associated with the United States under what is known as the Compact of Free Association, giving the states international sovereignty and ultimate control over their territory. However, the governments of those areas have agreed to allow the United States to provide defense; the U.S. federal government provides funding grants and access to U.S. social services for citizens of these areas. The United States benefits from its ability to use the islands as strategic military bases.

Associated state (Note: Arranged by date of free association.)	Associated with	Associated since	Level of association	International status
Cook Islands	New Zealand	4 August 1965	New Zealand acts on behalf of the Cook Islands and Niue in foreign affairs and defence issues, but only when requested so by their respective local governments and with their advice and consent.	Not a UN member state. Independence in foreign relations recognised by the UN
Niue	New Zealand	19 October 1974	New Zealand acts on behalf of the Cook Islands and Niue in foreign affairs and defence issues, but only when requested so by their respective local governments and with their advice and consent.	Not a UN member state. Independence in foreign relations recognised by the UN
Marshall Islands	United States	21 October 1986	The United States provides defence, funding grants, and access to U.S. social services for citizens of these areas under the Compact of Free Association.	UN member state
Federated States of Micronesia	United States	3 November 1986	The United States provides defence, funding grants, and access to U.S. social services for citizens of these areas under the Compact of Free Association.	UN member state
Palau	United States	1 October 1994	The United States provides defence, funding grants, and access to U.S. social services for citizens of these areas under the Compact of Free Association.	UN member state

== Former associated states ==
A formal association existed under the West Indies Act 1967 between the United Kingdom and the six West Indies Associated States. These were former British colonies in the Caribbean: Antigua (1967–1981), Dominica (1967–1978), Grenada (1967–1974), Saint Christopher-Nevis-Anguilla (1967–1983), Saint Lucia (1967–1979), and Saint Vincent (1969–1979). Under this arrangement, each state had internal self-government, but the UK retained responsibility for foreign relations and defence. The United Nations never determined whether these associated states had achieved a full measure of self-government within the meaning of the United Nations Charter and General Assembly resolutions. Within a few years after the status of associated state was created, all six of the former associated states requested and were granted full independence, except for Anguilla within the former St. Kitts-Nevis-Anguilla union, which separated from the associated state before independence and became a British dependent territory on its own.

Shortly before the dissolution of the Soviet Union in 1991, the Tatar ASSR unilaterally seceded from the Russian SFSR, as the "sovereign state" of Tatarstan and a "subject of international law". In 1994 Tatarstan and the Russian Federation entered into a treaty specifying that Tatarstan was "associated" with the latter (rather than being an integral part of it). Through the agreement, Tatarstan delegated certain powers (such as some foreign relations and defence) to Russia. Changes made to Tatarstan's constitution in 2002 have been seen by some commentators as fundamentally changing this relationship, with Tatarstan now functioning as essentially an integral part of Russia.

== Proposed associated states ==
=== Puerto Rico ===
While Puerto Rico is described as a 'free associated state' under its Spanish-language constitution, its status is not equivalent to that of a separate state under international law, since it legally remains a U.S. territory. Some scholars and politicians have proposed Puerto Rico sign a Compact of Free Association with the U.S. The soberanista movement advocates for the territory to be granted a freely associated status. The 2017 status referendum presented "Independence/Free Association" as an option; if the majority of voters had chosen it, a second round of voting would have been held to choose between free association and full independence. In 2022, the US Congress introduced the Puerto Rico Status Act, which would hold a federally-sponsored referendum on the territory's status, with a free association status expected to be presented as an option similar to those in force in the Marshall Islands, Micronesia, and Palau.

=== Guam ===
The government of the U.S. unincorporated territory of Guam, led by Governor Eddie Calvo, started campaigning in early 2011 for a plebiscite on Guam's future political status, with free association following the model of the Marshall Islands, Micronesia, and Palau as one of the possible options. The plebiscite, however, only allowed "native inhabitants" as defined under Guam law to register for it. A white, non-Chamorro resident, Arnold Davis, filed a federal lawsuit in 2011 for being denied registration for the plebiscite and a July 2019 ruling by the United States Court of Appeals for the Ninth Circuit ultimately blocked the plebiscite on the basis that the law was race-based and violated constitutionally protected voting rights; the Supreme Court of the United States declined to hear the Government of Guam's appeal in May 2020.

=== Faroe Islands ===
A similar path has been proposed in order to update the political relationship between the Faroe Islands and Denmark, in which the former would become an associated state of the latter. In 2000, the Løgting set up the Faroese Treaty Commission which drafted a constitution for a state in free association with Denmark. The Self-Government Party supports gradually increased autonomy until it reaches de facto independence.

=== Tokelau ===
Tokelau (a dependent territory of New Zealand) voted on a referendum in February 2006 to determine whether it wanted to remain a New Zealand territory or become the third state in free association with New Zealand (after the Cook Islands and Niue). While a majority of voters chose free association, the vote did not meet the two-thirds threshold needed for approval. A similar referendum in October 2007 under United Nations supervision yielded similar results, with the proposed free association falling 16 votes short of approval.

=== Cocos (Keeling) Islands ===
In 1984, a referendum was held on the Cocos (Keeling) Islands; only 21 of the 261 voted for free association with Australia while the vast majority preferred integration.

=== New Caledonia ===
To resolve the crisis in New Caledonia, French president Emmanuel Macron reportedly proposed an "associated state" status with a "strong link with France". The final agreement intended the formation of a "State of New Caledonia" which other states could recognise but its status would be enshrined in the French constitution and remain "French". The 2025 Bougival Accord, that will have to be accepted in the 2026 referendum, will transform New Caledonia into a "State of New Caledonia", and transfer some of the French state's powers to this new state.

=== Basque Country ===
In 2003, then-Basque Country president Juan José Ibarretxe proposed to the Spanish Congress of Deputies a reform that would have transformed the region from an autonomous community within Spain into a state in free association, thus making Spain a confederal state. The proposal was overwhelmingly rejected by the Congress.

=== Bangsamoro ===
The establishment of a Bangsamoro Juridical Entity (BJE) was proposed in 2008 by the Moro Islamic Liberation Front and the Philippines. The two parties were to sign a memorandum of agreement on ancestral domain which would lead to the establishment of a new autonomous government in the southern Philippines. However the deal was halted by the Supreme Court of the Philippines, which ruled that the BJE's proposed "associative relationship" with the Philippine national government was incompatible with the Constitution of the Philippines.

=== Tobago ===
Some form of free association has been suggested as a solution to occasional calls of self-determination by the people of Tobago, the smaller island within the country of Trinidad and Tobago, either within the single state (analogous to the situation of Scotland within the United Kingdom) or as a separate political entity.

=== Abkhazia and Transnistria ===
According to statements of officials of Abkhazia and Transnistria (self-proclaimed partially recognized republics seceded from the former USSR's constituent republics of Georgia and Moldova respectively), both intend, after recognition of their independence, to become associated states of the Russian Federation. In Transnistria a referendum took place in September 2006, in which secession from Moldova and "future free association" with Russia was approved by a margin of 97%, even though the results of the referendum were internationally unrecognised.

== Other comparable relationships ==
Other situations exist where one state has power over another political unit. Dependent territories and the United Kingdom's Crown dependencies are examples of this, where an area has its own political system and often internal self-government, but does not have overall sovereignty. In a loose form of association, some sovereign states cede some power to other states, often in terms of foreign affairs and defence.

=== States currently ceding power to another state ===
Associated state	Associated with	Associated since	Level of association	International status
Andorra	Spain and France	1278	Defence is the responsibility of Spain and France. Andorra is a co-principality between the head of state of France (currently the president) and the Bishop of Urgell.	UN member state
Kiribati	Australia and New Zealand	1979	Kiribati has no military. National defence is provided by Australia and New Zealand.	UN member state
Liechtenstein	Switzerland	1923	Although the head of state represents Liechtenstein in its international relations, Switzerland has taken responsibility for much of Liechtenstein's diplomatic relations. Liechtenstein maintains no military.	UN member state
Monaco	France	1861	France has agreed to defend the independence and sovereignty of Monaco, while the Monegasque government has agreed to exercise its sovereign rights in conformity with French interests, which was reaffirmed by the Treaty of Versailles in 1919.	UN member state
Nauru	Australia	1968	Nauru has no military. Australia informally takes responsibility for its defence.	UN member state
Samoa	New Zealand	1914	Samoa has no regular military. New Zealand provides defence under an informal agreement, but Samoa is regarded as fully independent.	UN member state
San Marino	Italy	1939	Defence is the responsibility of Italy by arrangement.	UN member state
Tuvalu	Australia	1978	Tuvalu has no military. Australia informally takes responsibility for its defence.	UN member state
Vatican City	Switzerland	1506	Vatican City uses the Pontifical Swiss Guard, founded by Pope Julius II and provided by Switzerland, as the Pope's bodyguards.	UN General Assembly observer state
Vatican City	Italy	1929	According to the Lateran Treaty, anyone who loses Vatican City citizenship and possesses no other citizenship automatically becomes an Italian citizen. The military defence of the Vatican City is provided by Italy.	UN General Assembly observer state

=== States formerly ceding power to another state ===
Iceland, formerly part of Denmark, became a nominally sovereign state in 1918. It remained in a personal union with the Danish Crown and continued to have a common foreign policy with Denmark until 1944, when it became an independent republic.

Bhutan, a former protectorate of British India, agreed in a 1949 treaty to allow the newly independent India to guide its foreign relations in a relatively loose form of association, which resulted in Bhutan sometimes being described as a "protected state". This relationship was updated in a 2007 treaty, in which the provision requiring Bhutan to accept India's guidance on foreign policy was rescinded.

== Microstates as modern protected states ==
The existence of free relationship based on both delegation of sovereignty and benign protection can be seen as a defining feature of microstates. According to the definition of microstates proposed by Dumienski (2014): "Microstates are modern protected states, i.e. sovereign states that have been able to unilaterally depute certain attributes of sovereignty to larger powers in exchange for benign protection of their political and economic viability against their geographic or demographic constraints." Adopting this approach permits separating microstates from both small states and autonomies or dependencies. Microstates understood as modern protected states may include such states as Liechtenstein, San Marino, Monaco, Vatican City, Andorra, Niue, the Cook Islands, and Palau.

== See also ==
- Commonwealth realm
- Crown dependency
- Dominion
- Dutch Caribbean
- External association, 1921 proposed relationship between Ireland and the United Kingdom
- List of sovereign states without armed forces
- Home rule
- Self-governing colony
