= Superstate =

Large and powerful state formed from smaller states

A superstate is defined as "a large and powerful state formed when several smaller countries unite", or "A large and powerful state formed from a federation or union of nations", or "a hybrid form of polity that combines features of ancient empires and modern states." This is distinct from the concept of superpower, although these are sometimes seen together.

== History ==
In the early 20th century, "superstate" had a similar definition as today's supranational organisations. In a 1927 article by Edward A. Harriman on the League of Nations, a superstate was defined as merely "an organisation, of which a state is a member, which is superior to the member themselves", in that "[a] complete superstate has legislative, executive and judicial organs to make, to execute and to interpret its laws". According to this definition, Harriman saw the League of Nations as a "rudimentary superstate", and the United States of America as "an example of a complete and perfect superstate".

In World Order of Bahá'u'lláh, first published in 1938, Shoghi Effendi, the Guardian of the Baháʼí Faith, described the anticipated world government of that religion as the "world’s future super-state" with the Baháʼí Faith as the "State Religion of an independent and Sovereign Power."

In the 1970s, academic literature used the term "superstate" to indicate a particularly rich and powerful state, in a similar fashion to the term superpower. In this context, the term was applied to Japan, as contemporary academics suggested that Japan could displace the U.S. as the world's sole superpower, becoming the world's foremost economic power in the (then) near future because of its economic growth in recent decades. The prediction did not come true.

In contemporary political debate, especially the one centred on the European Union, the term "superstate" is used to indicate a development in which the Union develops from its current de facto status as a confederation to become a fully-fledged federation, known as the United States of Europe. For instance, Glyn Morgan contrasts the perspective of a "European superstate" to the ones of "a Europe of nation-states" and of "a post-sovereign European polity". In her definition, a "European superstate is nothing more than a sovereign state - a tried and tested type of polity that predominates in the modern world - operating on a European wide scale", i.e., "a unitary European state". Especially after the European debt crisis, economic literature started to discuss the role of European union as a European superstate. In particular, they compared the emergence of a debt union to the federal structure of Germany.

The term was famously used by Margaret Thatcher in her 1988 Bruges speech, when she decried the perspective of "a European super-state exercising a new dominance from Brussels", and has since entered the eurosceptic lexicon. Tony Blair argued in 2000 that he welcomed an EU as a "superpower, not a superstate".

In a 2022 study, Alasdair Roberts argues that superstates should be construed as hybrid forms of political organization: "Every superstate carries the burdens of statehood, that is, the duties of intensive governance and respect for human rights that are carried by all modern states. But superstates also carry the burdens of empire, principally the burden of holding together a large and diverse population spread across a vast territory. Superstates are distinguished from ordinary states by problems of governance that are intensified by scale, diversity, and complexity". In this view, a superstate need not be highly centralized, just as some empires were not highly centralized. Thus is it possible to describe the European Union as a superstate without conceding that is a "centralized, unitary leviathan".

== Fictional superstates ==
- The Alliance for Democracy in The Domination
- Earth Alliance and Interstellar Alliance in Babylon 5
- Earth Federation in Mobile Suit Gundam
- Eastasia, Eurasia and Oceania in Nineteen Eighty-Four
- The Eastern Empire, the American Republic, and the European Confederation in Lord of the World
- Federation of the Americas in Call of Duty: Ghosts
- Fleet of Worlds in Fleet of Worlds
- Galactic Empire in Foundation universe
- Galactic Empire and Galactic Republic in Star Wars
- Imperium of Man in Warhammer 40,000
- Mega-City One in Judge Dredd
- Tamrielic Empire in The Elder Scrolls
- Unified Earth Government in Halo
- United Federation of Planets in Star Trek
- United Nations Of Earth and the Outer Planets Alliance in The Expanse
- The World State in Brave New World
- Federation of Super Earth in Helldivers and Helldivers 2
- Organization of North American Nations in Infinite Jest

== See also ==
- China
- Imperial Federation
- India
- List of countries and dependencies by area
- Organization of American States
- Soviet Union
- United States
