= External association =

Hypothetical relationship between Ireland and the Commonwealth of Nations

External association was a hypothetical relationship between Ireland and the Commonwealth of Nations proposed by Éamon de Valera in 1921–1922, whereby Ireland would be a sovereign state associated with, but not a member of, the Commonwealth; the British monarch would be head of the association, but not head of state of Ireland. De Valera proposed external association as a compromise between isolationist Irish republicanism on the one hand and Dominion status on the other. Whereas a full republic could not be a member of the Commonwealth until the London Declaration of 1949, a Dominion could not be fully independent until the Statute of Westminster 1931.

External association was never implemented as such; however, de Valera's 1930s diplomacy reflected similar ideas, as did the Commonwealth's London Declaration.

== Origins ==
De Valera's thinking on external association was influenced, during his tour of the United States in 1919–1920, by the US Sugar Intervention in Cuba. In U.S. media in February 1920 he compared the future relationship between Britain and Ireland with the Monroe Doctrine relationship between the U.S. and Cuba. Darragh Gannon suggests the mixed reception this "Cuban policy" received among Dáil members foreshadowed the Treaty split of 1921–1922. Nicholas Mansergh traces the first reference to "external association" to 27 July 1921, preceding a proposal by de Valera on 10 August for a treaty of free association between the Irish Republic and Great Britain. De Valera told Mansergh in 1965 that the idea of external association came to him "one morning as he was tying his bootlaces", shortly after Jan Smuts' exploratory visit following the June 1921 ceasefire which ended the Anglo-Irish War (later called the Irish War of Independence). In September 1921, David Lloyd George, the UK prime minister, proposed negotiations into "how the association of Ireland with the community of nations known as the British Empire may best be reconciled with Irish national aspirations". De Valera accepted and explained his concept of external association to the plenipotentiaries sent to London. Their head, Arthur Griffith, later said de Valera told him the idea was to get out of the "straitjacket of the Republic" while "bringing Cathal along", referring to Cathal Brugha, the staunchest republican in the Dáil ministry.

== Document No. 2 ==
The British ministers negotiating with the Irish plenipotentiaries rejected the idea of external association, and the Anglo-Irish Treaty the two sides signed on 6 December 1921 provided for an Irish Free State with the same status as Canada. De Valera opposed this, and in the Second Dáil debate on the Treaty offered his alternative "Document No. 2", of which articles 2 to 6 described the "Terms of Association":

2. That, for purposes of common concern, Ireland shall be associated with the States of the British Commonwealth, viz: the Kingdom of Great Britain, the Dominion of Canada, the Commonwealth of Australia, the Dominion of New Zealand, and the Union of South Africa.
3. That when acting as an associate the rights, status, and privileges of Ireland shall be in no respect less than those enjoyed by any of the component States of the British Commonwealth.
4. That the matters of "common concern" shall include Defence, Peace and War, Political Treaties, and all matters now treated as of common concern amongst the States of the British Commonwealth, and that in these matters there shall be between Ireland and the States of the British Commonwealth "such concerted action founded on consultation as the several Governments may determine".
5. That in virtue of this association of Ireland with the States of the British Commonwealth citizens of Ireland in any of these States shall not be subject to any disabilities which a citizen of one of the component States of the British Commonwealth would not be subject to, and reciprocally for citizens of these States in Ireland.
6. That, for purposes of the Association, Ireland shall recognise His Britannic Majesty as head of the Association.

De Valera, a former mathematics teacher, used Venn diagrams and other graphs to illustrate the relationships he envisaged between Ireland and the Commonwealth.

Michael Collins, one of the Treaty signatories, claimed that this document was not the work of de Valera and that identifying its (non-Irish) author was not difficult: "Dominionism tinges every line. No Irishman who understands the tradition and the history of Ireland would think or write of his country's aspirations in the terms used in this document".

Commentators have suggested the putative virtues of his proposal were too subtle and abstract to appeal to either supporters of the Treaty or republicans opposed to it. A journalist reporting on the Dáil debate said of de Valera's presentation, "One felt, however, we were entering the region of pure casuistry, nebulous, unpalpable and unreal."

== Rejection of association ==
The Dáil voted to accept the original Treaty, and de Valera resigned as President of Dáil Éireann. In the Irish Civil War, he was nominal leader of the anti-Treaty side, although the military force was led by republicans who regarded external association as an unacceptable compromise. Cardinal Michael Logue, Ireland's Catholic primate, condemned the anti-Treaty side:

Never before in the world's history did such a wild and destructive hurricane spring from such a thin, intangible, unsubstantial vapour. The difference between some equivocal words in an oath; the difference between internal and external connection with the British Commonwealth: this is the only foundation I have ever seen alleged. Men versed in the subtleties of the schools may understand them; men of good, sound, practical common sense shall hardly succeed.

In June 1922, UK prime minister David Lloyd George sought clarification from the pro-Treaty Provisional Government that was drafting the Constitution of the Irish Free State; one question was:

Is it intended by the Irish representatives that the I.F.S. shall be within the empire on the basis of common citizenship, or merely associated with it?

Arthur Griffith's answer was:

it is intended that the Irish Free State shall be, not merely associated with, but a member of and within the Community of nations known as the British Empire and on the basis of common citizenship as explicitly provided by the Treaty

The pro-Treaty Cumann na nGaedheal party formed the Executive Council of the Irish Free State until 1932 and participated in the Commonwealth's Imperial Conferences.

== 1930s developments ==
De Valera's Fianna Fáil party, founded in 1926, came to office in the Free State after the 1932 general election and proceeded to eliminate many of the symbols of the state's Dominion status, including the Oath of Allegiance and appeal to the Judicial Committee of the Privy Council. Although this implicitly abrogated the 1921 Treaty, the Privy Council ruled in 1935 that the Statute of Westminster 1931 empowered the Free State government to do so.

The Constitution (Amendment No. 27) Act 1936 abolished the office of Governor-General and removed all references to the monarch from the constitution, with most functions reassigned to the Executive Council. However, the Executive Authority (External Relations) Act 1936, passed immediately afterwards, effected that the king continued to be head of state for external purposes, including treaties and accrediting diplomats. In 1937, a new constitution came into effect. This made no mention of the British Commonwealth or monarchy, and established the office of President of Ireland with many of the internal functions of a head of state, including precedence, pardon, signing laws, and appointing ministers, judges, and military officers. Nevertheless, the External Relations Act remained in force by virtue of the Constitution's allusion to the British monarch in Article 29.4.2°:

For the purpose of the exercise of any executive function of the State in or in connection with its external relations, the Government may to such extent and subject to such conditions, if any, as may be determined by law, avail of or adopt any organ, instrument, or method of procedure used or adopted for the like purpose by the members of any group or league of nations with which the State is or becomes associated for the purpose of international co-operation in matters of common concern.

Commentators have compared this situation, where the President was the de facto internal head of state while the king was the de jure external head of state, with de Valera's 1920s external association proposal. While he had made "a republic in all but name", de Valera avoided explicitly declaring a republic, which he believed would alienate the Unionist majority in Northern Ireland and thus entrench partition. Ireland took no part in Commonwealth business; whether it remained a member of the Commonwealth or merely associated with it was a moot point. De Valera told the Dáil in 1945:

Deputy [James] Dillon … asked was this State a republic, and were we a member State of the British Commonwealth. ... The position, as I conceive it to be, is this: We are an independent republic, associated as a matter of our external policy with the States of the British Commonwealth. To mark this association, we avail ourselves of the procedure of the External Relations Act ..., by which the King recognised by the States of the British Commonwealth therein named acts for us, under advice, in certain specified matters in the field of our external relations.
And now, to Deputy Dillon's second question—are we or are we not a member of the British Commonwealth? That is a question for which the material necessary for a conclusive answer is not fully available. It depends on what the essential element is in the constitution of the British Commonwealth.

By contrast, Nicholas Mansergh wrote in 1948, "External association has never been put into practice because the United Kingdom and the oversea dominions have never recognized that it exists."

== Republic of Ireland and London Declaration ==
Fianna Fáil lost office at the 1948 general election, and the inter-party government's Republic of Ireland Act 1948, which came into force in 1949, repealed the External Relations Act and declared the Irish state to be a republic, implicitly leaving the Commonwealth. With the prospect of newly independent India also declaring a republic, the Commonwealth leaders agreed in the London Declaration of 28 April 1949 that republics could be members of the Commonwealth, while the British monarch would remain Head of the Commonwealth. The situation where the monarch was head of the association but not necessarily of its members has been compared to de Valera's external association.

== See also ==
- Associated state
- Dominion
- Commonwealth realm
- Imperial Federation
