= Matangi, Tokelau =

Island in New Zealand

Coordinates: 9°21′S 171°11′W

Matangi is an islet of the Fakaofo island group of Tokelau.
