= Fakaofo (village) =

- Village
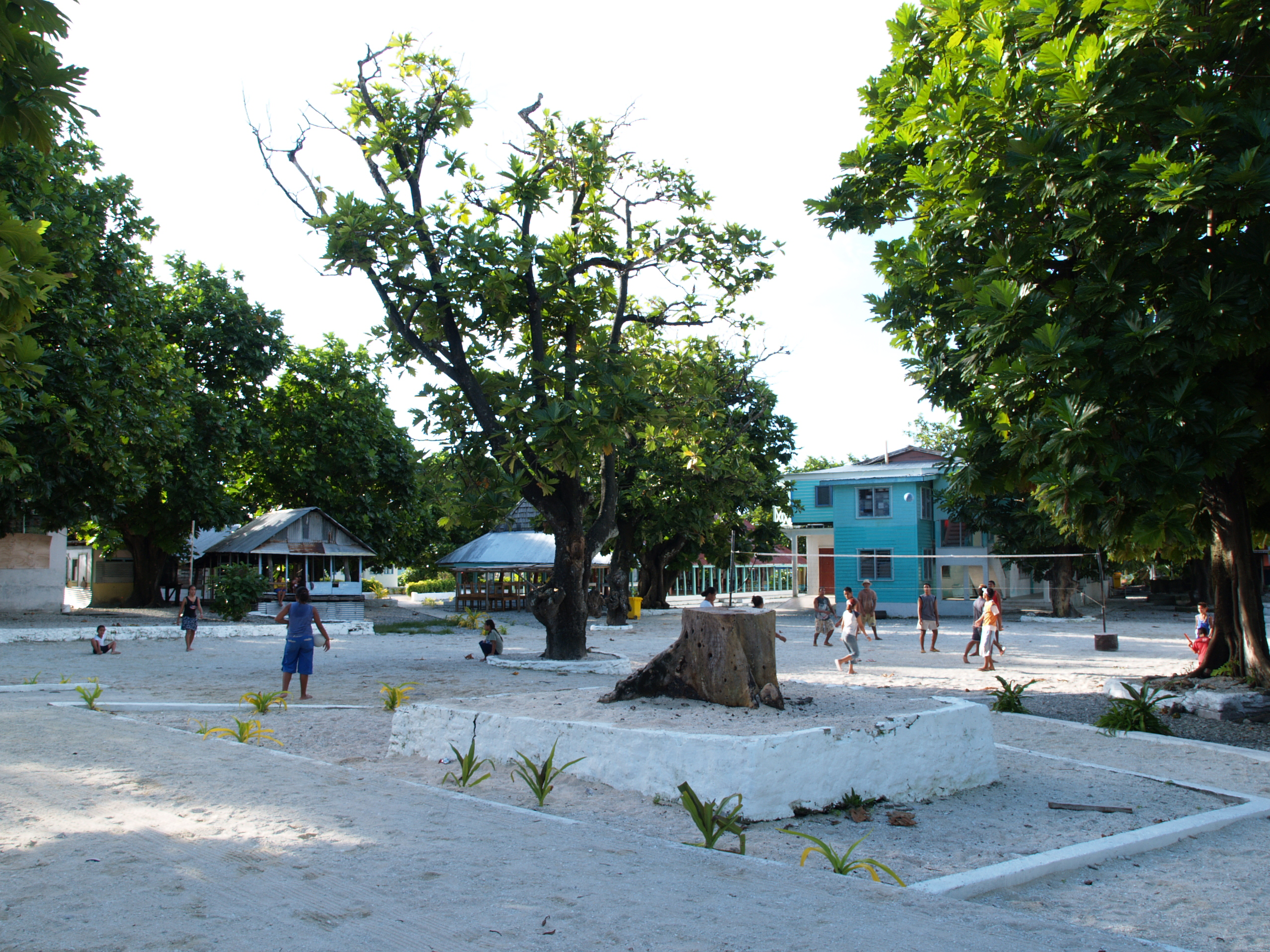
- Fakaofo village square

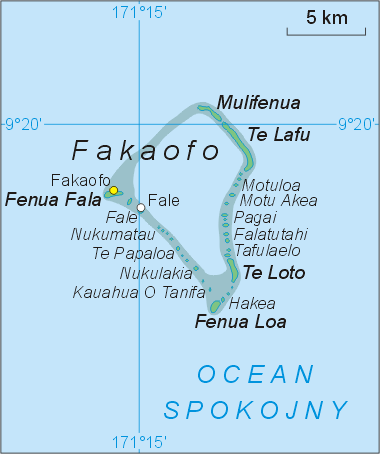
- Map of the atoll. Fakaofo village is located in the north-west.

- Location within Tokelau Location within Oceania Location within Pacific Ocean
- Coordinates: 9°22′31″S 171°15′58″W
- Country: New Zealand
- Territory: Tokelau
- Atoll: Fakaofo

Population (2010)
  - Total: 137
- Time zone: UTC+10 (UTC)

Fakaofo is a village on Fakaofo atoll in Tokelau. It is located to the north-west of the atoll. It is notable for its monument which is a coral slab personifying Tui Tokelau, a god once worshipped in the islands.

Fishing is important to the local economy and food supply.
