= Teafua =

Coordinates: 9°23′S 171°16′W

Teafua is an islet of the Fakaofo island group of Tokelau.
