= Pio Tuia =

Tokelauan politician (born 1943)

Faipule Pio Iosefo Tuia

4th, 7th, 10th, 13th & 16th Ulu-o-Tokelau
- In office 23 February 2008 – 21 February 2009
- Preceded by: Kuresa Nasau
- Succeeded by: Foua Toloa
- In office February 2005 – February 2006
- Preceded by: Patuki Isaako
- Succeeded by: Kolouei O'Brien
- In office February 2002 – February 2003
- Preceded by: Kuresa Nasau
- Succeeded by: Kolouei O'Brien
- In office February 1999 – February 2000
- Preceded by: Kuresa Nasau
- Succeeded by: Kolouei O'Brien
- In office February 1996 – February 1997
- Preceded by: Lepaio Simi
- Succeeded by: Falima Teao

Pio Iosefo Tuia ONZM (born 1943) has been Ulu o Tokelau, head of government of Tokelau, six times. The position of ulu rotates annually between the three faipule (one for each of the three atolls), who are elected for terms lasting three years. Tuia served as ulu for the sixth time in February 2011. He was also the faipule of Nukunonu and a member of the Council for the Ongoing Government of Tokelau.

It was under Tuia's leadership that Tokelau became, in November 2011, a founding member of the Polynesian Leaders Group, a regional grouping intended to cooperate on a variety of issues including culture and language, education, responses to climate change, and trade and investment.

Tuia's five terms:

- February 1996 – February 1997
- February 1999 – February 2000
- February 2002 – February 2003
- February 2005 – February 2006
- February 2008 – 21 February 2009

In the 2006 Queen's Birthday Honours, Tuia was appointed an Officer of the New Zealand Order of Merit, for services to the Tokelau Islands.
