= Nukulakia =

Islet in Tokelau

Coordinates: 9°25′S 171°13′W

Nukulakia is an islet of the Fakaofo island group of Tokelau.
