= Patuki Isaako =

Tokelauan political figure

Faipule Patuki Isaako

12th Ulu-o-Tokelau
- In office February 2004 – February 2005
- Preceded by: Kolouei O'Brien
- Succeeded by: Pio Tuia

Patuki Isaako is a Tokelauan political figure.

== Background and political role ==
Isaako is from Atafu. He was the head of government of Tokelau (Ulu o Tokelau) from February 2004 to February 2005.

=== Issues ===
In May 2004, the United Nations Special Committee on Decolonialization held a seminar to discuss the independence of Tokelau from New Zealand. Isaako opposed the idea, mainly because Tokelau may be too small and undeveloped to function on its own.

== See also ==
- Politics of Tokelau
