= Nukumatau =

Islet in Tokelau

Coordinates: 9°24′S 171°14′W

Nukumatau is an islet of the Fakaofo island group of Tokelau.
