= Lalo, Tokelau =

Coordinates: 9.340°S 171.196°W

Lalo is an islet of the Fakaofo island group of Tokelau.
