= Mulifenua =

Coordinates: 9.3278°S 171.2079°W

Mulifenua is an islet of the Fakaofo island group of Tokelau.
