= Fenua Loa =

Coordinates: 9.4399°S 171.2051°W

Fenua Loa is an islet of the Fakaofo island group of Tokelau.
