= Saumatafanga =

Islet in Fakaofo, Tokelau

Coordinates: 9°25′S 171°12′W

Saumatafanga is an islet of the Fakaofo island group of Tokelau.
