= Fale, Tokelau =

Settlement and island in the Fakaofo atoll in Tokelau

Fale
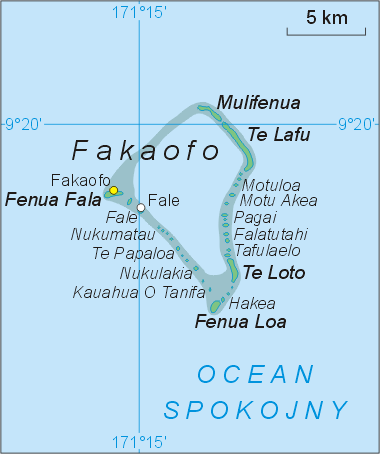
- Map of Fakaofo Atoll, with the names of the islets in Tokelauan and the name of the Pacific Ocean in Polish

- Location in Toketau Islands Location in the Pacific

Geography
- Coordinates: 9.3846°S 171.2483°W
- Archipelago: Fakaofo

Administration
- Tokelau

Fale is an islet of the Fakaofo island group of Tokelau. The main settlement in the group is located on the island. As of 2018, 355 people lived on the islet. Fish is the main food source and the largest export product of the village.

The islet has a ship route to Nukunonu.
