= Fakaofo =

Atoll in the South Pacific

Coordinates: 9°21′55″S 171°12′54″W

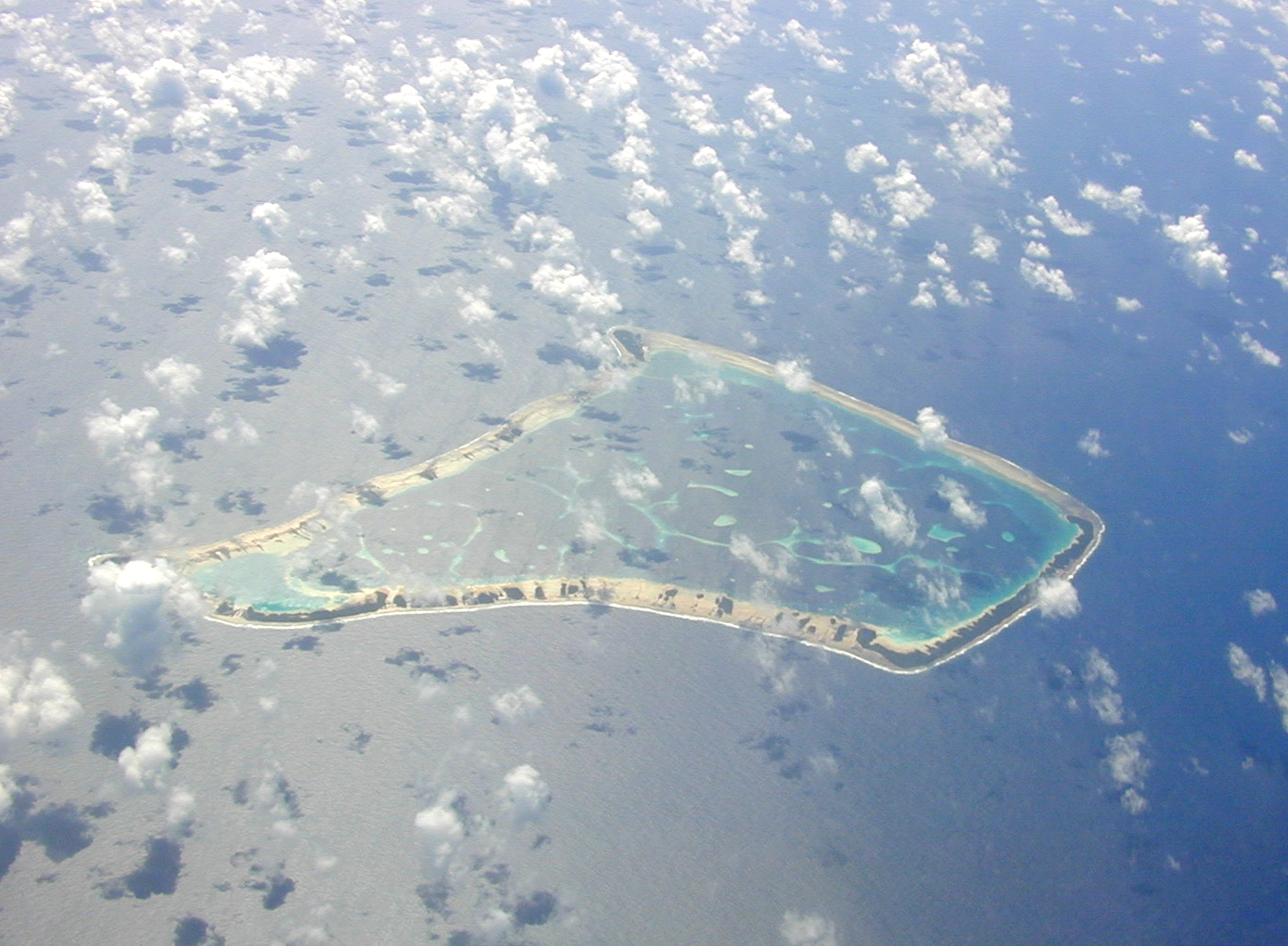
- Aerial view of Fakaofo

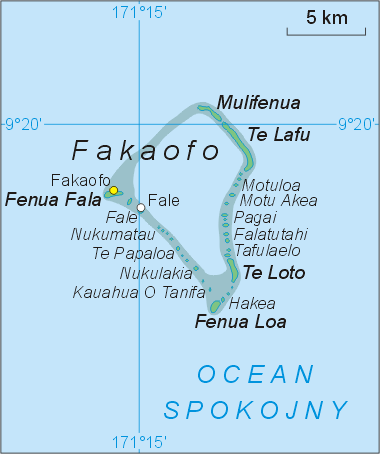
- A map of Fakaofo Atoll and all its islands (map in Polish)

Geography
- Archipelago: Tokelau
- Total islands: 43
- Major islands: Fale on Pacific Ocean
- Area: 3 km^{2} (1.2 sq mi)

Administration
- New Zealand
- Dependent territory: Tokelau
- Largest settlement: Fale
- Faipule (leader): Esera Fofō Tuisano
- Pulenuku (mayor): Feleti Tulafono

Demographics
- Population: 483
- Languages: Tokelauan, English

Fakaofo, formerly known as Bowditch Island, is a South Pacific Ocean atoll located in the Tokelau Group. The actual land area is only about 3 km^{2} (1.1 sq mi), consisting of islets on a coral reef surrounding a central lagoon of some 45 km^{2}. According to the 2006 census 483 people officially live on Fakaofo (however just 370 were present at census night). Of those present 70% belong to the Congregational Church and 22% to the Catholic Church.

== Geography and government ==
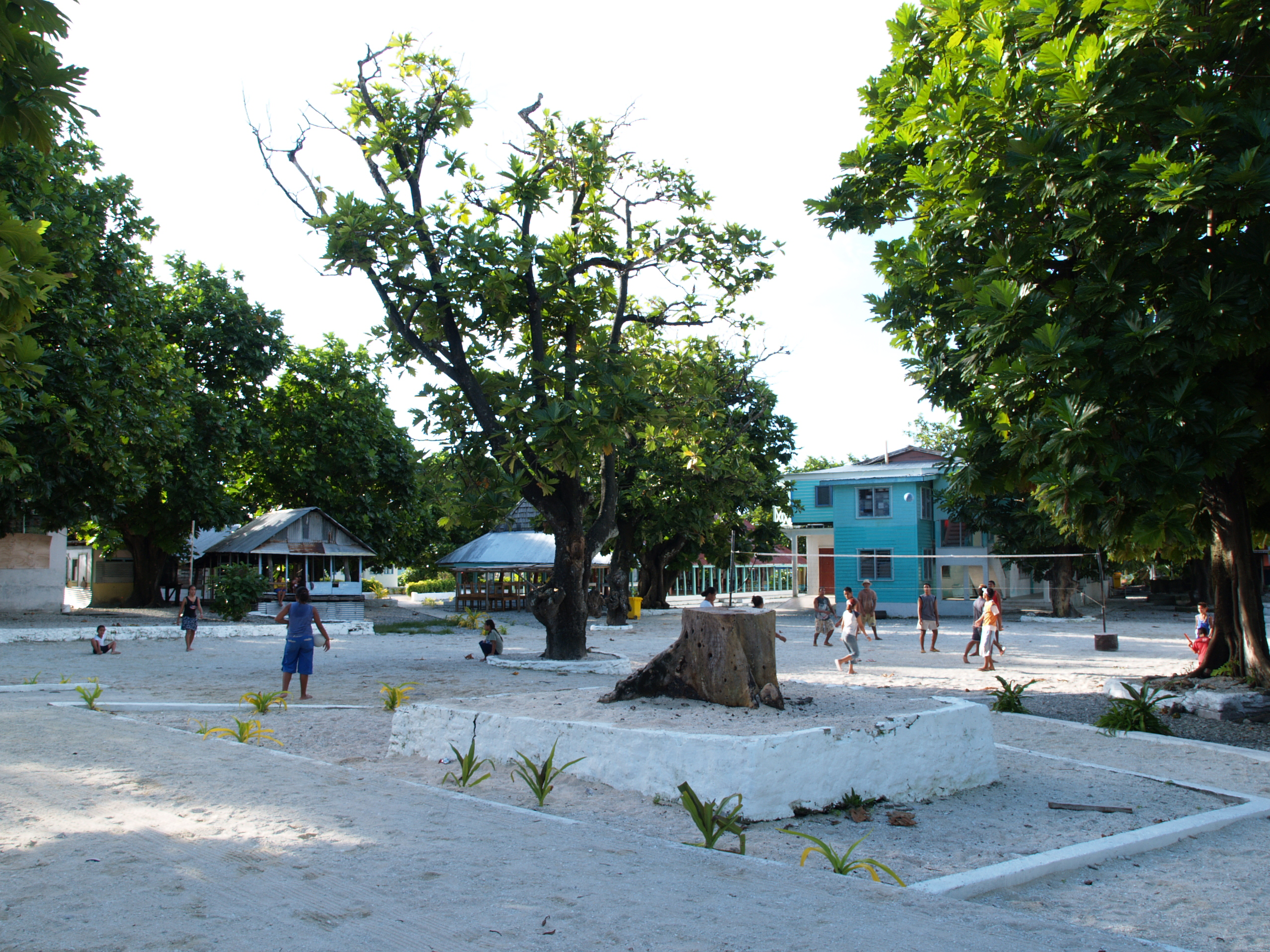
Village square

The main settlement on the island is Fale on Fale Islet, towards the western side of the atoll. Located two kilometres to the west of it is the relatively large Fenua Fala Islet, where a second settlement was established in 1960. Other islets in the group include Teafua, Nukumatau, Nukulakia, Fenua Loa, Saumatafanga, Motu Akea, Matangi, Lalo, and Mulifenua.

Fakaofo's Council of Elders is made up of citizens over the age of 60.

== History ==
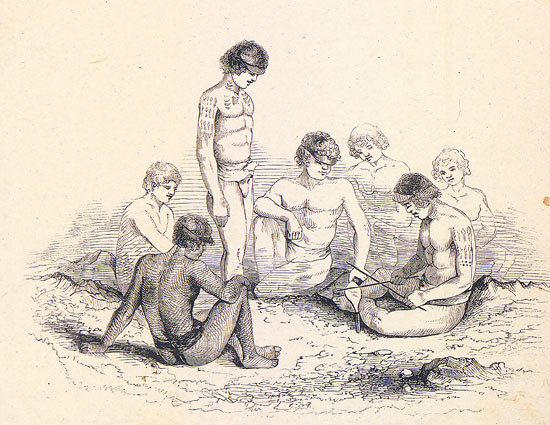
Natives of Fakaofo; engraving after a drawing by Alfred Thomas Agate

The island was sighted by the whale ship General Jackson in 1835 and named DeWolf Island after their ship's owner. The General Jackson returned in 1839.

The island was then named Bowditch (after Nathaniel Bowditch), this island was visited by the American ship USS Peacock which was part of the first American voyage of discovery – The United States Exploring Expedition (also known as "the Ex Ex" or "the Wilkes Expedition"), 1838–1842, United States Navy Lieutenant Charles Wilkes commanding. Nathaniel Bowditch (1773–1838) was a noted American navigator who wrote a famous two-volume encyclopedia of navigation and sailing that is still used and published today by the Defense Mapping Agency Topographic Center (DMATC). In Twenty Years Before The Mast, (Note: This book should not be confused with another book with a similar title by Richard Henry Dana Jr., which tells about hide trading on the California coast in the early 19th century.) Charles Erskine wrote "The people found on this island had no knowledge of fire, which I believe, is the only instance of the kind on record."

In a village on the island is a coral slab monument personifying Tui Tokelau, a god once worshiped in the islands.

In 1889, Fakaofu and several other Tokelauan islands were claimed by Great Britain as part of the Union Islands. In 1916, the Union Islands were annexed to the Gilbert and Ellice Islands colony and then, in 1925, reassigned to the Dominion of New Zealand under the administration of Territory of Western Samoa. Unlike Atafu and Nukunono, no U.S. claims under the Guano Island Act were ever made on Fakaofu. Despite this, in 1979, as part of the Treaty of Tokehega, the U.S. formally renounced its prior claim on all Tokelauan islands now under New Zealand sovereignty, including Fakaofu, and a maritime boundary between Tokelau and American Samoa was established.

== Climate crisis ==
One of Fakaofo's islets is surrounded by five-metre high concrete walls, constructed by residents to protect it from rising sea levels.

== List of islands ==
1. Mulifenua
2. Vini
3. Motu Pelu
4. Avaono
5. Talapeka
6. Te Lafu
7. Olokalaga
8. Palea
9. Manumea
10. Ofuna
11. Kavivave
12. Heketai
13. Motuloa
14. Motu Akea
15. Motu Iti
16. Niue
17. Fugalei
18. Manuafe
19. Otafi Loto
20. Otafi Loa
21. Kaivai
22. Nukuheheke
23. Nukamahaga Lahi
24. Nukamahaga Iti
25. Tenki
26. Pagai
27. Matakitoga
28. Vaiaha
29. Falatutahi
30. Lapa
31. Hugalu
32. Logotaua
33. Tafolaelo
34. Otano
35. Akegamutu
36. Te Loto
37. Kapiomotu
38. Metu
39. Hakea Mahaga
40. Pukava
41. Hakea
42. Te Kau Afua o Humu
43. Nukulakia
44. Te Papaloa
45. Pataliga
46. Nukumatau
47. Fale
48. Te Afua tau Lua
49. Fenua Fala

== See also ==
- List of Guano Island claims
